= Fat Wreck Chords discography =

- Studio albums: 157
- Extended plays: 58
- Live albums: 13
- Compilation albums: 33
- Singles: 69
- Video albums: 10
- Demo albums: 2
- Films: 1
- Box sets: 2

The discography of Fat Wreck Chords, an independent record label based in San Francisco, consists of 345 releases: 157 studio albums, 13 live albums, 33 compilation albums, 2 demo albums, 58 EPs, 69 singles, 10 video albums, 1 documentary film, and 2 box sets.

Fat Wreck Chords was started by Fat Mike of NOFX and his then-wife, Erin Burkett, in 1990. Their first release was a reissue of NOFX's 1987 EP The P.M.R.C. Can Suck on This, originally published by Wassail Records. The label's catalog numbering system began with no. 501 for this release. Over the years the label has done several series of themed releases, including the Fat Music series of compilation albums and the Live in a Dive series of live albums. The 200–300 range of catalog numbers has been used for vinyl-only 7" singles and EPs including the Fat Club singles series, NOFX's 7" of the Month Club, and Me First and the Gimme Gimmes' "square dance series". Catalog no. FAT 700 was Wrecktrospective, a three-disc compilation of tracks from the label's first 19 years.

Fat Wreck Chords also has two subsidiary imprints, Honest Don's Records and Pink and Black Records.

== Releases ==
Release date	Artist	Title	Format	Type	Catalog
1990-01-01	NOFX	The P.M.R.C. Can Suck on This (reissue of 1987 Wassail Records release)	7"	EP	FAT 501
1992-05-01	NOFX	The Longest Line	12", CD	EP	FAT 503
1992-10-01	Lagwagon	Duh	LP, CD	studio album	FAT 502
1992-10-01	Lagwagon	"Tragic Vision" / "Angry Days"	7"	single	FAT 504
1992-11-16	NOFX	"Liza and Louise"	7"	single	FAT 505
1993-05-31	Propagandhi	How to Clean Everything	LP, CD	studio album	FAT 506
1993-05-31	No Use for a Name	The Daily Grind	12", CD	EP	FAT 507
1993-08-26	Propagandhi	How to Clean a Couple o' Things	7"	EP	FAT 508
1993-08-26	Rancid	Radio Radio Radio	7"	EP	FAT 509
1993-08-26	88 Fingers Louie	Go Away!	7"	EP	FAT 510
1993-08-26	Face to Face	"Disconnected"	7"	single	FAT 511
1993-08-26	88 Fingers Louie	Wanted	7"	EP	FAT 512
1994-01-04	Lagwagon	Trashed	LP, CD	studio album	FAT 513
1994-05-15	Strung Out	Another Day in Paradise	LP, CD	studio album	FAT 517
1994-08-26	NOFX	"Don't Call Me White"	7"	single	FAT 514
1994-08-26	Bracket	Stinky Fingers	7"	EP	FAT 516
1994-08-26	Bracket	Bs.	7"	EP	FAT 518
1994-10-17	Guns 'n' Wankers	For Dancing and Listening	12", CD	EP	FAT 519
1994-10-17	various artists	Fat Music for Fat People	LP, CD	compilation album	FAT 520
1994-11-04	NOFX	Ten Years of Fuckin' Up	VHS, DVD	video album	FAT 590
1995-01-07	Face to Face	Don't Turn Away (reissue of 1992 Dr. Strange Records release)	LP, CD	studio album	FAT 515
1995-02-01	Good Riddance	For God and Country	LP, CD	studio album	FAT 523
1995-02-15	No Use for a Name	¡Leche con Carne!	LP, CD	studio album	FAT 522
1995-04-17	Tilt	'Til It Kills	LP, CD	studio album	FAT 521
1995-06-19	NOFX	HOFX	12"	EP	FAT 526
1995-06-19	Wizo	Uuaarrgh! (reissue of 1994 Hulk Räckorz release)	LP, CD	studio album	FAT 527
1995-08-22	NOFX	I Heard They Suck Live!!	LP, CD	live album	FAT 528
1995-08-26	Good Riddance	Decoy	7"	EP	FAT 524
1995-08-26	Horace Pinker	"Song About Selling Out"	7"	single	FAT 525
1995-08-26	Frenzal Rhomb	4 Litres	7"	EP	FAT 529
1995-08-26	Bracket	For Those About to Mock	7"	EP	FAT 530
1995-08-26	Me First and the Gimme Gimmes	Denver	7"	single	FAT 531
1995-11-21	Lagwagon	Hoss	LP, CD	studio album	FAT 532
1996-02-13	Snuff	Demmamussabebonk	LP, CD	studio album	FAT 533
1996-02-13	Hi-Standard	Growing Up	LP, CD	studio album	FAT 534
1996-03-05	various artists	Survival of the Fattest	LP, CD	compilation album	FAT 538
1996-04-23	Strung Out	Suburban Teenage Wasteland Blues	LP, CD	studio album	FAT 537
1996-04-23	Propagandhi	Less Talk, More Rock	LP, CD	studio album	FAT 666
1996-06-04	Good Riddance	A Comprehensive Guide to Moderne Rebellion	LP, CD	studio album	FAT 539
1996-07-23	Goober Patrol	Vacation	LP, CD	studio album	FAT 541
1996-08-20	Snuff	Snuff Said (reissue of 1989 Workers Playtime release)	LP, CD	studio album	FAT 543
1996-08-20	Snuff	Flibbidydibbidydob (reissue of 1990 Workers Playtime release)	12", CD	EP	FAT 544
1996-08-26	Diesel Boy	Strap On Seven Inch	7"	EP	FAT 535
1996-08-26	Hi-Standard	"California Dreamin'"	7"	single	FAT 536
1996-08-26	Snuff	Long Ball to No-One	7"	EP	FAT 540
1996-08-26	New Bomb Turks	"Stick It Out"	7"	single	FAT 542
1996-08-26	NOFX	Fuck the Kids	7"	EP	FAT 546
1996-08-26	Bracket	"F" Is for Fat	7"	EP	FAT 549
1996-09-10	Swingin' Utters	A Juvenile Product of the Working Class	LP, CD	studio album	FAT 545
1996-11-05	Screeching Weasel	Bark Like a Dog	LP, CD	studio album	FAT 547
1996-11-19	Bracket	"E" Is for Everything on Fat Wreck Chords	CD	compilation album	FAT 548
1997-02-11	88 Fingers Louie	The Dom Years	CD	compilation album	FAT 551
1997-02-11	Screw 32	Under the Influence of Bad People	LP, CD	studio album	FAT 552
1997-05-20	various artists	Peepshow	VHS	video album	FAT 553
1997-07-29	Me First and the Gimme Gimmes	Have a Ball	LP, CD	studio album	FAT 554
1997-07-29	Hi-Standard	Angry Fist	LP, CD	studio album	FAT 555
1997-07-29	Snuff	Potatoes and Melons Wholesale Prices Straight from the Lock Up	LP, CD	studio album	FAT 556
1997-08-19	No Use for a Name	Making Friends	LP, CD	studio album	FAT 557
1997-08-19	Lagwagon	Double Plaidinum	LP, CD	studio album	FAT 558
1997-09-23	Bracket	Novelty Forever	LP, CD	studio album	FAT 559
1997-11-11	88 Fingers Louie	The Teacher Gets It	7"	EP	FAT 550
1997-11-25	various artists	Physical Fatness	LP, CD	compilation album	FAT 560
1998-02-10	Good Riddance	Ballads from the Revolution	LP, CD	studio album	FAT 565
1998-03-07	Tilt	"Gun Play"	7"	single	FAT 566
1998-03-24	Tilt	Collect 'Em All	LP, CD	studio album	FAT 567
1998-04-07	Strung Out	Crossroads & Illusions	7", CD	EP	FAT 569
1998-04-07	Wizo	Kraut & Rüben	12", CD	compilation album	FAT 571
1998-05-05	Snuff	Schminkie Minkie Pinkie	7", CD	EP	FAT 563
1998-05-05	Goober Patrol	Eight of Spades	7"	EP	FAT 564
1998-05-05	Strung Out	Twisted by Design	LP, CD	studio album	FAT 570
1998-05-19	Snuff	Tweet Tweet My Lovely	LP, CD	studio album	FAT 562
1998-06-23	Swingin' Utters	Five Lessons Learned	LP, CD	studio album	FAT 574
1998-07-07	Swingin' Utters	"I Need Feedback"	7"	single	FAT 573
1998-07-28	Consumed	Breakfast at Pappa's	10", CD	EP	FAT 575
1998-08-11	Mad Caddies	Duck and Cover	LP, CD	studio album	FAT 576
1998-08-25	Screeching Weasel	Television City Dream	LP, CD	studio album	FAT 572
1998-10-20	The Dickies	"My Pop the Cop"	7"	single	FAT 568
1998-10-20	Goober Patrol	The Unbearable Lightness of Being Drunk	LP, CD	studio album	FAT 577
1998-11-11	Strung Out	The Skinny Years...Before We Got Fat	CD	compilation album	FAT 580
1998-11-24	Lagwagon	Let's Talk About Feelings	10", CD	studio album	FAT 578
1998-11-24	Swingin' Utters	The Sounds Wrong E.P.	CD	EP	FAT 579
1998-11-24	The Ataris	Look Forward to Failure	CD	EP	FAT 581
1999-01-12	Sick of It All	"Potential for a Fall"	7", CD	single	FAT 583
1999-02-23	Sick of It All	Call to Arms	LP, CD	studio album	FAT 582
1998-04-06	various artists	Life in the Fat Lane	LP, CD	compilation album	FAT 585
1999-05-04	Good Riddance	Operation Phoenix	LP, CD	studio album	FAT 587
1999-05-04	Frenzal Rhomb	"We're Going Out Tonight"	7", CD	single	FAT 588
1999-05-18	Me First and the Gimme Gimmes	Are a Drag	LP, CD	studio album	FAT 586
1999-05-18	NOFX	"Timmy the Turtle"	7"	single	FAT 589
1999-06-01	various artists	Short Music for Short People	LP, CD	compilation album	FAT 591
1999-06-15	Frenzal Rhomb	A Man's Not a Camel	LP, CD	studio album	FAT 595
1999-06-15	Swingin' Utters	Brazen Head EP	CD	EP	FAT 596
1999-08-10	Tilt	Viewers Like You	LP, CD	studio album	FAT 592
1999-08-21	Avail	100 Times	CD	EP	FAT 598
1999-08-24	NOFX	Louise and Liza	7"	EP	FAT 594
1999-10-05	No Use for a Name	More Betterness!	LP, CD	studio album	FAT 593
1999-11-02	Consumed	Hit for Six	LP, CD	studio album	FAT 584
1999-11-02	Hi-Standard	Making the Road	LP, CD	studio album	FAT 599
1999-11-02	Lagwagon	"A Feedbag of Truckstop Poetry"	7"	single	FAT 600
1999-11-23	NOFX	The Decline	12", CD	EP	FAT 605
2000-03-21	Snuff	Numb Nuts	LP, CD	studio album	FAT 601
2000-05-09	Bracket	When All Else Fails	LP, CD	studio album	FAT 607
2000-05-23	Good Riddance	The Phenomenon of Craving	10", CD	EP	FAT 611
2000-05-30	NOFX	"Pods and Gods"	7"	single	FAT 614
2000-06-06	Mad Caddies	The Holiday Has Been Cancelled	CD	EP	FAT 604
2000-06-20	Avail	One Wrench	LP, CD	studio album	FAT 597
2000-06-20	Strung Out	The Element of Sonic Defiance	12", CD	EP	FAT 606
2000-10-10	Swingin' Utters	Swingin' Utters	LP, CD	studio album	FAT 603
2000-10-24	Less Than Jake	Borders & Boundaries	LP, CD	studio album	FAT 616
2000-11-21	Sick of It All	Yours Truly	LP, CD	studio album	FAT 612
2001-02-06	Propagandhi	Today's Empires, Tomorrow's Ashes	LP, CD	studio album	FAT 617
2001-02-20	Zero Down	With a Lifetime to Pay	LP, CD	studio album	FAT 619
2001-03-01	The Vandals	Fat Club no. 1	7"	single	
2001-03-06	various artists	Live Fat, Die Young	LP, CD	compilation album	FAT 613
2001-03-20	Me First and the Gimme Gimmes	Blow in the Wind	LP, CD	studio album	FAT 620
2001-03-20	Frenzal Rhomb	Shut Your Mouth	LP, CD	studio album	FAT 621
2001-04-01	American Steel	Fat Club no. 2	7"	single	
2001-04-10	Mad Caddies	Rock the Plank	LP, CD	studio album	FAT 615
2001-04-10	NOFX	Surfer	7"	EP	FAT 624
2001-04-17	The Dickies	"Free Willy"	7"	single	FAT 629
2001-04-24	Sick of It All	The Story So Far	VHS	video album	FAT 610
2001-04-24	Anti-Flag	Underground Network	LP, CD	studio album	FAT 623
2001-04-24	Rise Against	The Unraveling	LP, CD	studio album	FAT 628
2001-05-01	The Real McKenzies	Fat Club no. 3	7"	single	
2001-05-22	The Dickies	All This and Puppet Stew	LP, CD	studio album	FAT 608
2001-05-22	MxPx	The Renaissance EP	12", CD	EP	FAT 631
2001-06-01	MxPx	Fat Club no. 4	7"	single	FAT 208
2001-06-19	Snuff	Blue Gravy: Phase 9	10", CD	EP	FAT 627
2001-07-01	Strike Anywhere	Fat Club no. 5	7"	single	
2001-07-10	Good Riddance	Symptoms of a Leveling Spirit	LP, CD	studio album	FAT 625
2001-07-24	Hi-Standard	Love Is a Battlefield	CD	EP	FAT 632
2001-07-31	Good Riddance	Exposed! 1994–1999	VHS	video album	FAT 609
2001-08-01	Randy	Fat Club no. 6	7"	single	
2001-09-01	NOFX	Fat Club no. 7	7"	single	
2001-09-11	No Use for a Name	Live in a Dive	LP, CD	live album	FAT 622
2001-10-01	Swingin' Utters	Fat Club no. 8	7"	single	
2001-10-23	No Use for a Name	Incognito (reissue of 1990 New Red Archives release)	CD	studio album	FAT 634
2001-10-23	No Use for a Name	Don't Miss the Train (reissue of 1992 New Red Archives release)	CD	studio album	FAT 635
2001-10-23	Swingin' Utters	The Streets of San Francisco	CD	studio album	FAT 636
2001-11-01	Strung Out	Fat Club no. 9	7"	single	
2001-11-06	Tilt	Been Where? Did What?	LP, CD	compilation album	FAT 626
2001-11-20	various artists	Peepshow II	VHS	video album	FAT 618
2001-12-01	Enemy You	Fat Club no. 10	7"	single	
2002-01-01	The Lawrence Arms	Fat Club no. 11	7"	single	
2002-02-01	One Man Army	Fat Club no. 12	7"	single	
2002-02-11	The Lawrence Arms	Apathy and Exhaustion	LP, CD	studio album	FAT 637
2002-02-26	Bracket	Live in a Dive	LP, CD	live album	FAT 602
2002-04-23	Strung Out	An American Paradox	LP, CD	studio album	FAT 633
2002-05-07	various artists	Peepshow DVD	DVD	video album	FAT 644
2002-05-21	NOFX	45 or 46 Songs That Weren't Good Enough to Go on Our Other Records	LP, CD	compilation album	FAT 641
2002-06-04	Dillinger Four	Situationist Comedy	LP, CD	studio album	FAT 640
2002-06-16	No Use for a Name	Hard Rock Bottom	LP, CD	studio album	FAT 639
2002-08-13	Sick of It All	Live in a Dive	LP, CD	live album	FAT 638
2002-08-27	Lagwagon	Let's Talk About Leftovers	CD	compilation album	FAT 651
2002-11-05	Avail	Front Porch Stories	LP, CD	studio album	FAT 647
2002-11-19	various artists	Uncontrollable Fatulence	LP, CD	compilation album	FAT 646
2003-02-25	Swingin' Utters	Dead Flowers, Bottles, Bluegrass, and Bones	LP, CD	studio album	FAT 648
2003-03-11	Mad Caddies	Just One More	LP, CD	studio album	FAT 645
2003-03-25	NOFX	Regaining Unconsciousness	7", CD	EP	FAT 656
2003-04-08	Lagwagon	Blaze	LP, CD	studio album	FAT 642
2003-04-08	Rise Against	Revolutions per Minute	LP, CD	studio album	FAT 653
2003-04-22	The Fight	Home Is Where the Hate Is	10", CD	EP	FAT 660
2003-05-06	NOFX	The War on Errorism	LP, CD	studio album	FAT 657
2003-05-13	NOFX	"13 Stitches"	7"	single	FAT 661
2003-05-20	Good Riddance	Bound by Ties of Blood and Affection	LP, CD	studio album	FAT 654
2003-06-01	Frenzal Rhomb	Sans Souci	CD	studio album	FAT 655
2003-06-03	None More Black	File Under Black	LP, CD	studio album	FAT 659
2003-06-03	various artists	Liberation: Songs to Benefit PETA	CD	compilation album	FAT 663
2003-06-22	Strung Out	Live in a Dive	LP, CD	live album	FAT 652
2003-07-01	Me First and the Gimme Gimmes	Take a Break	LP, CD	studio album	FAT 650
2003-09-09	Sick of It All	Life on the Ropes	LP, CD	studio album	FAT 658
2003-09-23	The Lawrence Arms	The Greatest Story Ever Told	LP, CD	studio album	FAT 668
2003-10-21	Anti-Flag	The Terror State	LP, CD	studio album	FAT 643
2003-11-04	Against Me!	Against Me! as the Eternal Cowboy	LP, CD	studio album	FAT 667
2003-11-11	Western Addiction	Remember to Dismember	7"	EP	FAT 673
2004-02-10	Subhumans	Live in a Dive	LP, CD	live album	FAT 664
2004-02-10	Descendents	'Merican	7", CD	EP	FAT 671
2004-03-23	Descendents	Cool to Be You	LP, CD	studio album	FAT 672
2004-04-20	various artists	Rock Against Bush, Vol. 1	CD / DVD	compilation album	FAT 675
2004-05-10	The Epoxies	Epoxies	CD	studio album	FAT 678
2004-05-18	Joey Cape / Tony Sly	Acoustic	LP, CD	studio album	FAT 665
2004-06-29	Swingin' Utters	Live in a Dive	LP, CD	live album	FAT 669
2004-07-12	Only Crime	To the Nines	LP, CD	studio album	FAT 682
2004-08-07	various artists	Peepshow III	DVD	video album	FAT 676
2004-08-10	various artists	Rock Against Bush, Vol. 2	CD / DVD	compilation album	FAT 677
2004-08-21	Mad Caddies	Songs in the Key of Eh	CD	live album	FAT 681
2004-10-05	Me First and the Gimme Gimmes	Ruin Jonny's Bar Mitzvah	LP, CD	live album	FAT 674
2004-10-19	Sick of It All	Outtakes for the Outcast	CD	compilation album	FAT 685
2004-11-02	Against Me!	We're Never Going Home	DVD	video album	FAT 679
2004-11-02	Strung Out	Exile in Oblivion	LP, CD	studio album	FAT 680
2005-02-01	NOFX	7" of the Month Club no. 1	7"	single	FAT 213
2005-02-08	Lagwagon	Live in a Dive	LP, CD	live album	FAT 670
2005-03-01	NOFX	7" of the Month Club no. 2	7"	single	FAT 214
2005-03-22	Smoke or Fire	Above the City	LP, CD	studio album	FAT 687
2005-04-01	NOFX	7" of the Month Club no. 3	7"	single	FAT 215
2005-04-05	Snuff	Six of One, Half a Dozen of the Other: 1986–2002	CD	compilation album	FAT 688
2005-04-19	Chixdiggit!	Pink Razors	LP, CD	studio album	FAT 692
2005-05-01	NOFX	7" of the Month Club no. 4	7"	single	FAT 216
2005-05-17	The Epoxies	Stop the Future	LP, CD	studio album	FAT 689
2005-06-01	NOFX	7" of the Month Club no. 5	7"	single	FAT 217
2005-06-14	No Use for a Name	Keep Them Confused	LP, CD	studio album	FAT 691
2005-06-28	The Soviettes	LP III	LP, CD	studio album	FAT 693
2005-07-01	NOFX	7" of the Month Club no. 6	7"	single	FAT 218
2005-08-01	NOFX	7" of the Month Club no. 7	7"	single	FAT 219
2005-08-23	The Soviettes	"Roller Girls"	7"	single	FAT 225
2005-08-23	The Real McKenzies	10,000 Shots	LP, CD	studio album	FAT 694
2005-08-23	Rise Against	The Unraveling (reissue of FAT 628)	CD	studio album	FAT 695
2005-09-01	NOFX	7" of the Month Club no. 8	7"	single	FAT 220
2005-09-06	Against Me!	"Don't Lose Touch"	12"	single	FAT 701
2005-09-06	Against Me!	Searching for a Former Clarity	LP, CD	studio album	FAT 684
2005-10-01	NOFX	7" of the Month Club no. 9	7"	single	FAT 221
2005-10-04	Screeching Weasel	Weasel Mania	LP, CD	compilation album	FAT 696
2005-10-18	Propagandhi	Potemkin City Limits	CD	studio album	FAT 683
2005-10-18	various artists	Protect: A Benefit for the National Association to Protect Children	CD	compilation album	FAT 697
2005-11-01	NOFX	7" of the Month Club no. 10	7"	single	FAT 222
2005-11-01	Western Addiction	Cognicide	LP, CD	studio album	FAT 698
2005-11-01	Lagwagon	Resolve	LP, CD	studio album	FAT 699
2005-12-01	NOFX	7" of the Month Club no. 11	7"	single	FAT 223
2006-01-01	NOFX	7" of the Month Club no. 12	7"	single	FAT 224
2006-01-10	Randy	Randy the Band	CD	studio album	FAT 704
2006-02-21	The Loved Ones	Keep Your Heart	LP, CD	studio album	FAT 705
2006-03-07	The Lawrence Arms	Oh! Calcutta!	LP, CD	studio album	FAT 703
2006-03-14	NOFX	Never Trust a Hippy	CD	EP	FAT 708
2006-03-21	The Sainte Catherines	Dancing for Decadence	LP, CD	studio album	FAT 709
2006-03-21	Love Equals Death	Nightmerica	LP, CD	studio album	FAT 710
2006-04-04	Against Me!	"From Her Lips to God's Ears (The Energizer)"	12"	single	FAT 714
2006-04-18	NOFX	Wolves in Wolves' Clothing	LP, CD	studio album	FAT 711
2006-05-02	None More Black	This Is Satire	CD	studio album	FAT 713
2006-06-27	Good Riddance	My Republic	LP, CD	studio album	FAT 707
2006-07-11	Dead to Me	Cuban Ballerina	LP, CD	studio album	FAT 715
2006-08-22	Against Me!	Americans Abroad!!! Against Me!!! Live in London!!!	LP, CD	live album	FAT 716
2006-09-05	Strike Anywhere	Dead FM	LP, CD	studio album	FAT 706
2006-10-17	Me First and the Gimme Gimmes	Love Their Country	LP, CD	studio album	FAT 712
2006-10-31	Leftöver Crack / Citizen Fish	"Baby Punchers" / "Meltdown"	7"	single	FAT 226
2006-11-14	Bad Astronaut	Twelve Small Steps, One Giant Disappointment	CD	studio album	FAT 686
2007-01-23	Only Crime	Virulence	LP, CD	studio album	FAT 719
2007-02-20	Smoke or Fire	This Sinking Ship	LP, CD	studio album	FAT 717
2007-03-06	Leftöver Crack / Citizen Fish	Deadline	CD	studio album	FAT 720
2007-04-10	Mad Caddies	"State of Mind" / "Backyard"	download	single	FAT 7021
2007-05-01	Mad Caddies	Keep It Going	CD	studio album	FAT 702
2007-06-12	Strung Out	Blackhawks Over Los Angeles	CD	studio album	FAT 721
2007-07-10	No Use for a Name	All the Best Songs	CD	compilation album	FAT 690
2007-09-04	The Flatliners	The Great Awake	LP, CD	studio album	FAT 723
2007-10-02	American Steel	Destroy Their Future	LP, CD	studio album	FAT 724
2007-10-02	Me First and the Gimme Gimmes	Dolly	7"	single	FAT 227
2007-11-06	Me First and the Gimme Gimmes	Cash	7"	single	FAT 228
2007-11-20	NOFX	They've Actually Gotten Worse Live!	LP, CD	live album	FAT 722
2007-12-11	Me First and the Gimme Gimmes	Willie	7"	single	FAT 229
2008-01-22	Me First and the Gimme Gimmes	Kenny	7"	single	FAT 230
2008-02-05	The Loved Ones	Build & Burn	LP, CD	studio album	FAT 728
2008-03-04	Me First and the Gimme Gimmes	Jerry	7"	single	FAT 231
2008-03-18	Good Riddance	Remain in Memory: The Final Show	LP, CD	live album	FAT 725
2008-04-01	No Use for a Name	The Feel Good Record of the Year	LP, CD	studio album	FAT 730
2008-07-08	Me First and the Gimme Gimmes	Have Another Ball	LP, CD	compilation album	FAT 729
2008-08-05	The Real McKenzies	Off the Leash	LP, CD	studio album	FAT 731
2008-08-19	Lagwagon	I Think My Older Brother Used to Listen to Lagwagon	12", CD	EP	FAT 733
2008-09-30	Star Fucking Hipsters	Until We're Dead	LP, CD	studio album	FAT 732
2008-10-14	Dillinger Four	Civil War	LP, CD	studio album	FAT 718
2008-10-28	Dead to Me	Little Brother	12", CD	EP	FAT 727
2008-10-28	Swingin' Utters	Hatest Grits: B-Sides and Bullshit	LP, CD	compilation album	FAT 734
2009-02-03	The Loved Ones	Distractions	12", CD	EP	FAT 738
2009-03-17	NOFX	NOFX: Backstage Passport	DVD	documentary film	FAT 740
2009-03-31	Strung Out	Prototypes and Painkillers	LP, CD	compilation album	FAT 736
2009-04-14	Bullet Treatment	Designated Vol. I	7"	EP	FAT 232
2009-04-28	NOFX	Coaster	LP, CD	studio album	FAT 737
2009-05-12	Rise Against	"Grammatizator" / "Voice of Dissent"	7"	single	FAT 234
2009-05-26	Pour Habit	Suiticide	CD	studio album	FAT 742
2009-07-07	Against Me!	The Original Cowboy	LP, CD	demo album	FAT 743
2009-07-21	American Steel	Dear Friends and Gentle Hearts	LP, CD	studio album	FAT 741
2009-08-18	Paint It Black	Surrender	7"	EP	FAT 235
2009-09-01	Banner Pilot	Collapser	LP, CD	studio album	FAT 745
2009-09-15	Teenage Bottlerocket	They Came from the Shadows	LP, CD	studio album	FAT 747
2009-09-29	Strung Out	Agents of the Underground	LP, CD	studio album	FAT 739
2009-10-27	The Lawrence Arms	Buttsweat and Tears	7"	EP	FAT 236
2009-11-10	The Flatliners	Cynics	7"	EP	FAT 237
2009-11-10	Dead to Me	African Elephants	LP, CD	studio album	FAT 749
2009-11-24	NOFX	"Cokie the Clown"	7"	single	FAT 238
2009-11-24	NOFX	"My Orphan Year"	7"	single	FAT 239
2009-11-24	NOFX	Cokie the Clown	CD	EP	FAT 752
2009-12-08	various artists	Wrecktrospective	CD	compilation album	FAT 700
2010-02-16	Tony Sly	12 Song Program	LP, CD	studio album	FAT 751
2010-03-02	Tony Sly / Joey Cape	"Chemical Upgrade" / "The Contortionist"	7"	single	FAT 240
2010-03-16	Smoke or Fire	Prehistoric Knife Fight	7"	EP	FAT 241
2010-04-13	The Flatliners	Cavalcade	LP, CD	studio album	FAT 748
2010-06-22	Swingin' Utters	"Brand New Lungs"	7"	single	FAT 242
2010-06-22	The Real McKenzies	Shine Not Burn	LP, CD	studio album	FAT 753
2010-07-06	Good Riddance	Capricorn One: Singles & Rarities	LP, CD	compilation album	FAT 756
2010-07-20	Mad Caddies	Consentual Selections	LP, CD	compilation album	FAT 757
2010-08-17	NOFX	The Longest EP	LP, CD	compilation album	FAT 758
2010-09-14	Banner Pilot	Resignation Day	LP, CD	studio album	FAT 759
2010-09-28	The Flatliners	"Monumental"	7"	single	FAT 243
2010-10-26	Old Man Markley	"For Better, for Worse"	7"	single	FAT 244
2010-10-26	None More Black	Icons	LP, CD	studio album	FAT 760
2010-11-09	Smoke or Fire	The Speakeasy	LP, CD	studio album	FAT 735
2010-11-09	Screeching Weasel	Television City Dream (reissue of FAT 572)	LP, CD	studio album	FAT 761
2010-11-23	NOFX / The Spits	NOFX / The Spits	7"	EP	FAT 245
2010-11-23	Swingin' Utters	"Taking the Long Way"	7", CD	single	FAT 246
2010-11-23	various artists	Harder, Fatter + Louder!	LP, CD	compilation album	FAT 762
2011-01-18	Old Man Markley	Guts n' Teeth	LP, CD	studio album	FAT 763
2011-01-18	Cobra Skulls	Bringing the War Home	12", CD	EP	FAT 764
2011-02-01	Me First and the Gimme Gimmes	Go Down Under	7", CD	EP	FAT 765
2011-02-15	Chixdiggit!	Safeways Here We Come	12", CD	EP	FAT 766
2011-03-15	Screeching Weasel	First World Manifesto	LP, CD	studio album	FAT 767
2011-04-12	Teenage Bottlerocket	"Mutilate Me"	7"	single	FAT 248
2011-04-12	Pour Habit	Got Your Back	LP, CD	studio album	FAT 750
2011-04-16	Rise Against	"Join the Ranks"	7"	single	FAT 247
2011-04-26	Swingin' Utters	Here, Under Protest	LP, CD	studio album	FAT 754
2011-05-23	Against Me!	Total Clarity	LP, CD	demo album	FAT 744
2011-06-21	Ellwood	Lost in Transition	LP, CD	studio album	FAT 771
2011-07-19	Strung Out	Top Contenders	LP, CD	compilation album	FAT 768
2011-08-02	NOFX	NOFX	10", 12"	EP	FAT 773
2011-08-16	The Flatliners	"Count Your Bruises"	7"	single	FAT 251
2011-09-13	Me First and the Gimme Gimmes	Sing in Japanese	12", CD	EP	FAT 776
2011-09-20	Dead to Me / Off with Their Heads / Riverboat Gamblers	Dead to Me / Off with Their Heads / Riverboat Gamblers	7"	EP	FAT 249
2011-09-20	Old Man Markley	"Party Shack"	7"	single	FAT 253
2011-09-27	Cobra Skulls	Agitations	LP, CD	studio album	FAT 775
2011-10-11	Star Fucking Hipsters	From the Dumpster to the Grave	LP, CD	studio album	FAT 769
2011-10-11	Tony Sly	Sad Bear	LP, CD	studio album	FAT 770
2011-10-11	Frenzal Rhomb	Smoko at the Pet Food Factory	LP, CD	studio album	FAT 779
2011-10-25	Dead to Me	Moscow Penny Ante	LP, CD	studio album	FAT 774
2011-10-25	Banner Pilot	Heart Beats Pacific	LP, CD	studio album	FAT 778
2011-10-28	various artists	Fat Music for Fest People	10"	compilation album	FAT 780
2011-11-22	Lagwagon	Duh (reissue of FAT 502)	LP, CD	studio album	FAT 781
2011-11-22	Lagwagon	Trashed (reissue of FAT 513)	LP, CD	studio album	FAT 782
2011-11-22	Lagwagon	Hoss (reissue of FAT 532)	LP, CD	studio album	FAT 783
2011-11-22	Lagwagon	Double Plaidinum (reissue of FAT 558)	LP, CD	studio album	FAT 784
2011-11-22	Lagwagon	Let's Talk About Feelings (reissue of FAT 578)	LP, CD	studio album	FAT 785
2011-11-22	Lagwagon	Putting Music in Its Place	LP, CD	box set	FAT 786
2012-02-14	Useless ID	Symptoms	LP, CD	studio album	FAT 787
2012-03-27	The Real McKenzies	Westwinds	LP, CD	studio album	FAT 788
2012-04-24	NOFX	126 Inches of NOFX: Singles Collection	7"	box set	FAT 252
2012-06-05	The Lawrence Arms	An Evening of Extraordinary Circumstance	DVD	video album	FAT 772
2012-06-19	NOFX	"My Stepdad's a Cop and My Stepmom's a Domme"	7"	single	FAT 256
2012-06-19	Joey Cape / Tony Sly	Acoustic Volume Two	LP, CD	studio album	FAT 790
2012-07-03	Teenage Bottlerocket	Freak Out!	LP, CD	studio album	FAT 789
2012-08-14	NOFX	"Ronnie & Mags"	7"	single	FAT 259
2012-08-28	Morning Glory	Poets Were My Heroes	LP, CD	studio album	FAT 791
2012-09-11	NOFX	Self Entitled	LP, CD	studio album	FAT 777
2012-09-12	NOFX	The Decline	DVD	video album	FAT 904
2012-10-09	Less Than Jake	Borders & Boundaries (reissue of FAT 616)	LP/CD / DVD	studio album	FAT 793
2012-10-09	Cobra Skulls	"Eagle Eyes"	7"	single	FAT 261
2012-10-26	various artists	Fat Music for Fest People II	LP	compilation album	FAT 905
2012-10-30	The Flatliners	Destroy to Create (reissue of 2005 independent release)	LP	studio album	FAT 799
2012-11-06	Old Man Markley	"Blood on My Hands"	7"	single	FAT 260
2012-11-06	Swingin' Utters	"The Librarians Are Hiding Something"	7"	single	FAT 258
2012-11-27	Snuff	"In the Stocks"	7"	single	FAT 262
2013-01-08	Snuff	5-4-3-2-1-Perhaps?	LP, CD	studio album	FAT 903
2013-01-08	Less Than Jake	Greetings and Salutations from Less Than Jake	LP, CD	compilation album	FAT 906
2013-01-15	NOFX	"Xmas Has Been X'ed" / "New Year's Revolution"	7"	single	FAT 264
2013-02-05	Masked Intruder	Masked Intruder (reissue of 2012 Red Scare Industries release)	LP, CD	studio album	FAT 907
2013-02-19	Swingin' Utters	Poorly Formed	LP, CD	studio album	FAT 901
2013-03-05	Old Man Markley	Down Side Up	LP, CD	studio album	FAT 792
2013-05-07	Night Birds	"Maimed for the Masses"	7"	single	FAT 265
2013-05-14	Morning Glory	"Born to December"	7"	single	FAT 263
2013-05-28	Rise Against	RPM10 (reissue of FAT 653)	LP, CD	studio album	FAT 912
2013-07-23	Chixdiggit!	Born on the First of July (reissue of DON016)	LP	studio album	FAT 908
2013-07-23	Chixdiggit!	From Scene to Shining Scene (reissue of DON028)	LP	studio album	FAT 909
2013-07-23	Chixdiggit!	Double Diggits! (reissue of DON016 and DON028)	CD	compilation album	FAT 914
2013-07-23	Get Dead	Bad News	LP, CD	studio album	FAT 913
2013-08-20	Propagandhi	How to Clean Everything (20th Anniversary Edition) (reissue of FAT 506)	LP, CD	studio album	FAT 911
2013-09-03	Sundowner	Neon Fiction	LP, CD	studio album	FAT 918
2013-09-17	The Flatliners	Dead Language	LP, CD	studio album	FAT 917
2013-10-29	various artists	The Songs of Tony Sly: A Tribute	LP, CD	compilation album	FAT 915
2013-10-31	various artists	Fat Music for Fest People III	10"	compilation album	FAT 924
2013-11-05	Western Addiction	Pines	7"	ep/single	FAT 270
2013-11-12	Less Than Jake	See the Light	LP, CD	studio album	FAT 916
2013-11-26	The Flatliners	Caskets Full	7"	ep/single	FAT 266
2013-11-26	Swingin' Utters	Stuck in a Circle	7"	ep/single	FAT 267
2013-11-26	NOFX	Stoke Extinguisher	7"	ep/single	FAT 268
2013-11-26	Teenage Bottlerocket	American Deutsch Bag	7"	ep/single	FAT 271
2013-11-26	NOFX	Stoke Extinguisher	CD	ep/single	FAT 923
2013-11-29	various artists	Fat in New York 2013	7"	compilation album	FAT 269
2013-12-08	Off with Their Heads / Morning Glory	Always Alone E.P.	7"	ep/single	FAT 273
2013-12-10	Masked Intruder	Under the Mistletoe	7"	ep/single	FAT 272
2014-03-04	Morning Glory	War Psalms	LP, CD	studio album	FAT 922
2014-03-18	Joey Cape	Bridge	LP, CD	studio album	FAT 927
2014-03-18	Joey Cape	Doesn't Play Well With Others	LP, CD	studio album	FAT 928
2014-03-18	Joey Cape / Jon Snodgrass	Liverbirds	12", CD	studio album	FAT 929
2014-03-18	Joey Cape	Bad Loud – Volume One	LP	studio album	FAT 930
2014-03-18	Scorpios	Scorpios	12", CD	studio album	FAT 931
2014-04-01	Bad Cop/Bad Cop	Boss Lady	7"	ep/single	FAT 274
2014-04-15	Banner Pilot	Souvenir	LP, CD	studio album	FAT 925
2014-04-29	Uke-Hunt	The Prettiest Star	7"	ep/single	FAT 275
2014-05-06	Old Man Markley	Stupid Today	7"	ep/single	FAT 276
2014-05-13	Mad Caddies	Dirty Rice	LP, CD	studio album	FAT 746
2014-05-13	Me First and the Gimme Gimmes	Are We Not Men? We Are Diva!	LP, CD	studio album	FAT 919
2014-05-27	Masked Intruder	M.I.	LP, CD	studio album	FAT 926
2014-06-10	Sundowner	Little Elephant Sessions	7"	ep/single	FAT 277
2014-06-10	Less Than Jake	Do the Math	7"	ep/single	FAT 280
2014-06-10	Uke-Hunt	Uke-Hunt	LP, CD	studio album	FAT 910
2014-07-08	Mad Caddies	Brand New Scar	7"	ep/single	FAT 278
2014-07-08	Get Dead	Bygones	7"	ep/single	FAT 279
2014-07-22	The Copyrights	No Knocks	7"	ep/single	FAT 281
2014-07-22	Anti-Flag	A Document of Dissent: 1993–2013	LP, CD	compilation album	FAT 921
2014-08-19	The Dirty Nil	Cinnamon b/w Guided By Vices	7"	ep/single	FAT 282
2014-09-12	various artists	Fat Music for Riot Fest People	7"	compilation album	FAT 939
2014-10-14	C. J. Ramone	Understand Me?	7"	ep/single	FAT 285
2014-10-14	Chris Cresswell	One Week Record	LP	studio album	FAT 937
2014-10-28	Lagwagon	Hang	LP, CD	studio album	FAT 934
2014-10-29	various artists	Fat Music for Fest People IV	10"	compilation album	FAT 939FL
2014-11-11	Swingin' Utters	Fistful of Hollow	LP, CD	studio album	FAT 932
2014-11-25	C. J. Ramone	Last Chance To Dance	LP, CD	studio album	FAT 933
2014-12-09	NOFX	Backstage Passport Soundtrack	LP, CD	compilation album	FAT 755
2015-01-13	Dwarves	Gentleman Blag	7"	ep/single	FAT 283
2015-01-20	Less Than Jake	American Idle	7"	ep/single	FAT 286
2015-01-20	Home Street Home	Seeping Beauty	7"	ep/single	FAT 291
2015-01-20	Leftöver Crack	Fuck World Trade	LP, CD	studio album	FAT 935
2015-01-27	toyGuitar	In This Mess	LP, CD	studio album	FAT 938
2015-02-10	Home Street Home / NOFX	Home Street Home: Original Songs from the Shit Musical	LP, CD	studio album	FAT 800
2015-03-10	Western Addiction	I'm Not the Man That I Thought I'd Be	7"	ep/single	FAT 284
2015-03-10	The Flatliners	Resuscitation of the Year	7"	ep/single	FAT 287
2015-03-13	Western Addiction	Euro Tour E.P.	7"	ep/single	FAT 284-2
2015-03-24	Strung Out	Transmission.Alpha.Delta	LP, CD	studio album	FAT 920
2015-04-07	Darius Koski	Sisu	LP, CD	studio album	FAT 940
2015-04-07	The Real McKenzies	Rats in the Burlap	LP, CD	studio album	FAT 941
2015-04-21	Good Riddance	Peace in Our Time	LP, CD	studio album	FAT 942
2015-05-01	various artists	Greetings from Groezrock	10"	compilation album	FAT 944G
2015-05-23	various artists	Greetings from Punk Rock Bowling	10"	compilation album	FAT 944P
2015-06-16	Bad Cop/Bad Cop	Not Sorry	LP, CD	studio album	FAT 943
2015-06-19	various artists	Greetings from Amnesia Rockfest	10"	compilation album	FAT 944R
2015-07-24	Useless ID	The Lost Broken Bones	LP, CD	studio album	FAT 946
2015-07-24	PEARS	Go to Prison	LP, CD	studio album	FAT 947
2015-08-07	The Flatliners	Division of Spoils	LP, CD	compilation album	FAT 945
2015-08-07	various artists	Going Nowhere Fat	LP, CD	compilation album	FAT 949
2015-08-21	NOFX	Backstage Passport 2	DVD	videoalbum	FAT 755-9
2015-09-04	Joey Cape	Stitch Puppy	LP, CD	studio album	FAT 950
2015-09-11	various artists	Fat Music for Riot Fest People Vol. 2	7"	compilation album	FAT RIOT2
2015-09-18	PEARS	Letters to Memaw	7"	ep/single	FAT 288
2015-10-02	Night Birds	Mutiny at Muscle Beach	cd, cs, lp	studio album	FAT 948
2015-10-28	various artists	Fat Music for Fest People V	LP	compilation album	FAT 949FL
2015-11-27	Leftöver Crack	Constructs of the State	LP, CD	studio album	FAT 936
2016-01-22	Closet Fiends	Closet Fiends	7", CD	ep/single	FAT 292
2016-03-04	Face to Face	Protection	LP, CD	studio album	FAT 954
2016-03-18	Mean Jeans	Nite Vision	7"	ep/single	FAT 289
2016-04-01	PEARS	Green Star	LP, CD	studio album	FAT 951
2016-04-16	NOFX	Sid & Nancy	7"	ep/single	FAT 293
2016-04-22	Mean Jeans	Tight New Dimension	cd, cs, lp	studio album	FAT 955
2016-04-29	various artists	Fat Music for Wrecked People: Groez Cruise 2016	10"	compilation album	FAT 959GROEZ
2016-05-06	Useless ID	We Don't Want the Airwaves	7"	ep/single	FAT 290
2016-06-24	various artists	Fat Music for Wrecked People: Wreckfest 2016	10"	compilation album	FAT 959ROCK
2016-06-24	Direct Hit!	Wasted Mind	LP, CD	studio album	FAT 961
2016-07-01	various artists	Mild in the Streets: Fat Music Unplugged	LP, CD	compilation album	FAT 956
2016-07-01	Useless ID	State is Burning	LP, CD	studio album	FAT 960
2016-07-22	NOFX	Six Years on Dope	download	ep/single	FAT 412
2016-07-29	Get Dead	Honestly Lives Elsewhere	LP, CD	studio album	FAT 958
2016-08-08	various artists	Fat Wreck Holiday 2016	7"	compilation album	FAT 413PRH
2016-09-02	various artists	Riot Fest Denver 2016	7"	compilation album	FAT 413RIOTDEN
2016-09-02	toyGuitar	Move Like a Ghost	10", CD	ep/single	FAT 962
2016-09-16	various artists	Riot Fest Chicago	7"	compilation album	FAT 413RIOTCHI
2016-09-16	Chixdiggit	2012	LP, CD	ep/single	FAT 957
2016-10-07	Night Birds	Who Killed Mike Hunchback?	7"	ep/single	FAT 294
2016-10-07	NOFX	First Ditch Effort	LP, CD	studio album	FAT 953
2016-10-21	Dead to Me	I Wanna Die in Los Angeles	7"	ep/single	FAT 296
2016-10-26	various artists	Fat Music for Fest People VI	10"	compilation album	FAT 964
2016-11-11	PEARS / Zach Quinn	One Week Record	LP	studio album	FAT 967
2016-11-18	Frenzal Rhomb	We Lived Like Kings (We Did Anything We Wanted)	LP, CD	compilation album	FAT 969
2016-12-16	NOFX	Oxy Moronic	7"	ep/single	FAT 295
2016-12-16	Face to Face	Big Choice	LP, CD	studio album	FAT 971
2016-12-16	Face to Face	Face to Face	LP, CD	studio album	FAT 970
2016-12-23	NOFX	Hepatitis Bathtub	7"	ep/single	FAT 257
2017-02-10	The Bombpops	Fear of Missing Out	LP, CD	studio album	FAT 974
2017-03-03	The Real McKenzies	Two Devils Will Talk	LP, CD	studio album	FAT 977
2017-03-10	Western Addiction	Tremulous	LP, CD	studio album	FAT 965
2017-03-17	C. J. Ramone	American Beauty	LP, CD	studio album	FAT 968
2017-04-07	Me First and the Gimme Gimmes	Rake It In: The Greatestest Hits	LP, CD	compilation album	FAT 975
2017-04-14	Direct Hit!	Domesplitter	LP, CD	studio album	FAT 976
2017-04-28	The Dirty Nil	Minimum R&B	LP, CD	compilation album	FAT 980
2017-05-05	No Use for a Name	Justified Black Eye b/w Sidewalk	7"	ep/single	FAT 297
2017-05-05	Hi-Standard	Another Starting Line	7"	ep/single	FAT 298
2017-05-05	Face to Face	Say What You Want	7"	ep/single	FAT 299
2017-05-26	Frenzal Rhomb	Hi-Vis High Tea	LP, CD	studio album	FAT 978
2017-05-27	various artists	Punk Rock Bowling 2017	7"	compilation album	FAT PRB2017
2017-06-16	Bad Cop/Bad Cop	Warriors	LP, CD	studio album	FAT 979
2017-06-23	various artists	Rockfest 2017	7"	compilation album	FAT ROCK17
2017-07-14	Teenage Bottlerocket	Goin' Back To Wyo	7"	ep/single	FAT 325
2017-07-14	Teenage Bottlerocket	Stealing the Covers	LP, CD	studio album	FAT 982
2017-07-28	Scorpios	One Week Record	LP	studio album	FAT 983
2017-08-05	various artists	Brakrock Ecofest 2017	7"	compilation album	FAT BRAK
2017-08-07	various artists	Fat Wreck Holiday 2017	10"	compilation album	FAT 992
2017-08-11	No Use for a Name	Rarities Vol. 1: The Covers	LP, CD	compilation album	FAT 972
2017-09-01	Joey Cape	One Week Record	LP	studio album	FAT 987
2017-09-15	The Flatliners	The Great Awake Demos	7"	ep/single	FAT 326
2017-09-15	various artists	Fat Music For Riot Fest People Vol. 4	7"	compilation album	FAT 427
2017-09-15	Yotam Ben Horin	One Week Record	LP	studio album	FAT 988
2017-10-13	The Lillingtons	Stella Sapiente	LP, CD	studio album	FAT 993
2017-10-26	various artists	Fat Music For Fest People VII	10"	compilation album	FAT 994
2017-11-03	PEARS / Direct Hit!	Human Movement	LP, CD	studio album	FAT 985
2017-11-03	Darius Koski	What Was Once is By and Gone	LP, CD	studio album	FAT 991
2017-12-08	The Last Gang	Sing for Your Supper	7"	ep/single	FAT 327
2017-12-08	Swingin' Utters	Drowning in the Sea, Rising with the Sun	LP, CD	compilation album	FAT 986
2018-02-16	Mean Jeans	Jingles Collection	cd, cs, lp	studio album	FAT 997
2018-03-02	The Last Gang	Keep Them Counting	LP, CD	studio album	FAT 995
2018-03-30	The Lawrence Arms	We Are the Champions of the World	LP, CD	compilation album	FAT 984
2018-04-06	The Bombpops	Dear Beer	7"	ep/single	FAT 328
2018-05-05	various artists	Fat Music for Wrecked People: Punk in Drublic 2018	7"	compilation album	FAT 421
2018-05-11	Strung Out	Black Out the Sky	12", CD	ep/single	FAT 981
2018-05-26	various artists	Fat Music for Wrecked People: Punk Rock Bowling 2018	10"	compilation album	FAT 428
2018-06-15	Mad Caddies	Punk Rocksteady	LP, CD	studio album	FAT 998
2018-07-27	Face to Face	Hold Fast: Acoustic Sessions	LP, CD	studio album	FAT 105
2018-08-03	various artists	Fat Music for Wrecked People: Brakrock 2018	10"	compilation album	FAT 429BRAK
2018-08-03	NOFX	Ribbed: Live in a Dive	LP, CD	livealbum	FAT 902
2018-08-06	various artists	Fat Music for Wrecked People: Punk Rock Holiday 2018	10"	compilation album	FAT 429PRH
2018-08-31	Swingin' Utters	Peace and Love	LP, CD	studio album	FAT 106
2018-09-14	various artists	Fat Music for Riot Fest People Vol. 5	7"	compilation album	FAT 430
2018-09-21	Night Birds	Roll Credits	LP, CD	studio album	FAT 107
2018-10-24	various artists	Fat Music for Fest People VIII	10"	compilation album	FAT 431
2018-10-26	Direct Hit!	Crown of Nothing	LP, CD	studio album	FAT 101
2018-11-02	Sick of It All	Wake the Sleeping Dragon!	LP, CD	studio album	FAT 111
2018-11-09	Hi-Standard	The Gift	LP	studio album	FAT 102
2018-11-16	Useless ID	7 Hits from Hell	7"	ep/single	FAT 331
2018-11-30	Leftöver Crack	Leftöver Leftöver Crack: The E-Sides and F-sides	LP, CD	compilation album	FAT 104
2018-11-30	Me First and the Gimme Gimmes	Santa Baby	download	ep/single	FAT 333
2018-12-07	C. J. Ramone	Christmas Lullaby	7"	ep/single	FAT 332
2018-12-14	Mad Caddies	I'm Going Surfing for Xmas	download	ep/single	FAT 334
2019-03-15	Teenage Bottlerocket	Stay Rad!	LP, CD	studio album	FAT 116
2019-03-15	American Steel	State of Grace	7"	ep/single	FAT 335
2019-04-12	Clowns	Nature / Nurture	LP, CD	studio album	FAT 115
2019-04-26	Cokie the Clown	You're Welcome	LP, CD	studio album	FAT 103
2019-04-26	various artists	Fat Music for Wrecked People: Groezrock 2019	10"	compilation album	FAT 444GROEZ
2019-05-01	various artists	Fat Music for Wrecked People: SBAM 2019	10"	compilation album	FAT 444SBÄM
2019-05-03	various artists	Fat Music for Wrecked People: Punk in Drublic 2019	10"	compilation album	FAT 444PID
2019-05-10	C. J. Ramone	The Holy Spell...	LP, CD	studio album	FAT 127
2019-05-17	various artists	Fat Music for Wrecked People: Pouzza Fest 2019	10"	compilation album	FAT 444POUZ
2019-05-25	various artists	Fat Music for Wrecked People: Punk Rock Bowling 2019	10"	compilation album	FAT 444PRB
2019-05-31	Bracket	Too Old to Die Young	LP, CD	studio album	FAT 121
2019-06-21	Tommy and June	Tommy and June	LP, CD	studio album	FAT 113
2019-07-05	Joey Cape	Let Me Know When You Give Up	LP, CD	studio album	FAT 112
2019-07-19	Good Riddance	Thoughts and Prayers	LP, CD	studio album	FAT 124
2019-08-02	various artists	Fat Music for Wrecked People: Brakrock 2019	10"	compilation album	FAT 445BRAK
2019-08-05	various artists	Fat Music for Wrecked People: Punk Rock Holiday 2019	10"	compilation album	FAT 445PRH
2019-08-05	NOFX	Scarlett O'Heroin	7"	ep/single	FAT 432
2019-08-05	NOFX	Don't Count On Me	7"	ep/single	FAT 434
2019-08-09	Strung Out	Songs of Armor and Devotion	cd, cs, lp	studio album	FAT 122
2019-08-16	NOFX	Fish in a Gun Barrel	download	ep/single	FAT 433
2019-08-30	Mean Jeans	Gigantic Sike	LP, CD	studio album	FAT 123
2019-09-01	NOFX	My Eneme	7"	ep/single	FAT 433
2019-09-01	NOFX	I Don't Understand This World	7"	ep/single	FAT 435
2019-09-06	Teenage Bottlerocket / Human Robots	Teenage Bottlerocket vs. Human Robots	7"	ep/single	FAT 336
2019-09-13	various artists	Fat Music for Wrecked People: Riot Fest 2019	10"	compilation album	FAT 445RIOT
2019-09-20	Snuff	There's a Lot of It About	LP, CD	studio album	FAT 108
2019-09-27	Against Me!	Against Me! Is Reinventing Axl Rose	LP, CD	studio album	FAT 110
2019-10-04	Lagwagon	Railer	LP, CD	studio album	FAT 119
2019-10-18	Face to Face	Live in a Dive	LP, CD	livealbum	FAT 132
2019-11-01	MakeWar	Get It Together	LP, CD	studio album	FAT 134
2019-11-01	various artists	Fat Music for Fest People: 2019	10"	compilation album	FAT 445FEST
2019-12-13	NOFX	My Bro Cancer-vive Cancer	7"	ep/single	FAT 436
2019-12-13	NOFX	My Trois	7"	ep/single	FAT 437
2020-02-03	NOFX	My Wife Has a New GF	7"	ep/single	FAT 438
2020-02-03	NOFX	I Love You More Than I Hate Me	7"	ep/single	FAT 439
2020-03-06	PEARS	Pears	LP, CD	studio album	FAT 118
2020-03-13	The Bombpops	Death in Venice Beach	LP, CD	studio album	FAT 133
2020-03-27	The Suicide Machines	Revolution Spring	LP, CD	studio album	FAT 130
2020-04-08	D-Composers	Chabad Religion	LP	studio album	FAT 136
2020-04-10	NOFX	The Decline Live at Red Rocks	12"	ep/single	FAT 135
2020-04-10	The Flatliners	Cavalcade Demos	7"	ep/single	FAT 338
2020-05-01	Days N' Daze	Show Me the Blueprints	cd, cs, lp	studio album	FAT 129
