= List of punk rock albums =

This is a list of notable or influential albums in the history of punk rock.

== List ==
=== 1970 ===
- The Stooges – Fun House

=== 1973 ===
- Iggy and the Stooges – Raw Power
- New York Dolls – New York Dolls

=== 1976 ===
- Ramones – Ramones

=== 1977 ===
- Ramones – Leave Home
- The Damned – Damned Damned Damned
- The Saints – I'm Stranded
- The Clash – The Clash
- The Stranglers – Rattus Norvegicus
- The Jam – In the City
- Richard Hell and the Voidoids – Blank Generation
- The Heartbreakers – L.A.M.F.
- Dead Boys – Young Loud and Snotty
- Sex Pistols – Never Mind the Bollocks, Here's the Sex Pistols
- Ramones – Rocket to Russia
- Skrewdriver - All Skrewed Up
- Wire - Pink Flag

=== 1978 ===
- Buzzcocks – Love Bites
- Crass – The Feeding of the 5000
- Decibel – Punk
- Ramones – Road to Ruin
- X-Ray Spex – Germ Free Adolescents
- The Clash – Give 'Em Enough Rope

=== 1979 ===
- The Germs – (GI)
- The Clash – London Calling
- The Damned – Machine Gun Etiquette
- The Ruts – The Crack
- Stiff Little Fingers – Inflammable Material
- The Undertones – The Undertones
- U.K. Subs – Another Kind of Blues
- The Slits – Cut

=== 1980 ===
- Black Flag – Jealous Again
- Circle Jerks – Group Sex
- Dead Kennedys – Fresh Fruit for Rotting Vegetables
- Killing Joke – Killing Joke
- X – Los Angeles
- The Wipers – Is this Real?

=== 1981 ===
- The Adolescents – The Adolescents
- Black Flag – Damaged
- G.B.H. – Leather, Bristles, Studs, and Acne
- The Exploited – Punks Not Dead
- D.O.A. – Hardcore '81
- Minor Threat – Minor Threat/In My Eyes
- Mission of Burma – Signals, Calls, and Marches
- Angelic Upstarts – 2,000,000 Voices

=== 1982 ===
- Descendents – Milo Goes to College
- Discharge – Hear Nothing, See Nothing, Say Nothing
- Bad Brains – Bad Brains
- Flipper – Generic Flipper
- Fear – Fear The Record
- Fang – Landshark
- Angry Samoans – Back From Samoa
- Youth Brigade – Sound and Fury
- Anti-Nowhere League – We Are... The League
- Meat Puppets – Meat Puppets
- Misfits – Walk Among Us
- Bad Religion – How Could Hell Be Any Worse?

=== 1983 ===
- Bad Brains – Rock for Light
- Social Distortion – Mommy's Little Monster
- Suicidal Tendencies – Suicidal Tendencies
- Avengers – Avengers
- Misfits – Earth A.D./Wolfs Blood

=== 1984 ===
- Minutemen – Double Nickels on the Dime
- Hüsker Dü – Zen Arcade
- Black Flag – My War
- Black Flag – Family Man
- Black Flag – Slip It In
- RKL – It's a Beautiful Feeling

=== 1985 ===
- Misfits – Legacy of Brutality
- D.I. – Horse Bites Dog Cries
- D.R.I. – Dealing With It!
- Hüsker Dü – New Day Rising
- The Replacements – Tim
- Dead Milkmen – Big Lizard in My Backyard
- RKL – Keep Laughing

=== 1986 ===
- Bad Brains – I Against I
- Cro-Mags – The Age of Quarrel
- Misfits – Misfits (Misfits album)

=== 1987 ===
- Napalm Death – Scum
- Big Black – Songs About Fucking
- RKL – Rock 'n Roll Nightmare

=== 1988 ===
- Bad Religion – Suffer
- Sonic Youth – Daydream Nation
- Social Distortion – Prison Bound
- NOFX – Liberal Animation
- Fugazi – Fugazi (EP)

=== 1989 ===
- ALL – Allroy's Revenge
- Bad Religion – No Control
- Fugazi – 13 Songs
- Minor Threat – Complete Discography
- NOFX – S&M Airlines
- Operation Ivy – Energy
- Sick of It All – Blood, Sweat and No Tears
- Ramones – Brain Drain
- The Vandals – Peace Thru Vandalism / When in Rome Do as The Vandals

=== 1990 ===
- Bad Religion – Against the Grain
- Fugazi – Repeater
- Poison Idea – Feel the Darkness
- Social Distortion – Social Distortion
- Green Day – 39/Smooth
- No Use for a Name – Incognito

=== 1991 ===
- Leatherface – Mush
- Pegboy – Strong Reaction
- NOFX – Ribbed
- Green Day – Kerplunk!
- Pennywise – Pennywise

=== 1992 ===
- Bad Religion – Generator
- The Gits – Frenching the Bully
- Lagwagon – Duh
- NOFX – White Trash, Two Heebs and a Bean
- No Use for a Name – Don't Miss the Train
- Face to Face – Don't Turn Away

=== 1993 ===
- Bad Religion – Recipe for Hate
- Propaghandi – How to Clean Everything
- Pennywise – Unknown Road
- Tilt – Play Cell
- Rancid – Rancid
- No Use for a Name – Daily Grind
- Ten Foot Pole – Swill
- Millencolin – Use your nose
- SNFU- Something green and leafy this way comes
- RKL – Reactivate

=== 1994 ===
- Bad Religion – Stranger Than Fiction
- Green Day – Dookie
- NOFX – Punk in Drublic
- The Gits – Enter: The Conquering Chicken
- The Offspring – Smash
- Rancid – Let's Go
- Sunny Day Real Estate – Diary
- Lagwagon – Trashed
- Ten Foot Pole – Rev
- Strung Out – Another Day in Paradise
- Millencolin – Tiny Tunes
- RKL – Riches to Rags
- Blink-182 – Buddha
- Frenzal Rhomb – Dick Sandwich
- Millencolin – Skauch
- Hi-Standard – Last of Sunny Day
- Propagandhi/I Spy – I'd Rather Be Flag-Burning
- Gas Huffer – One Inch Masters

=== 1995 ===
- Jawbreaker – Dear You
- Quicksand – Manic Compression
- Rancid – ...And Out Come the Wolves
- Rocket From the Crypt – Scream, Dracula, Scream!
- Green Day – Insomniac
- Jayne County – Deviation
- No Use for a Name – ¡Leche con Carne!
- Pennywise – About Time
- Blink-182 – Cheshire Cat
- Good Riddance – For God and Country
- Millencolin – Life on a Plate
- Lagwagon – Hoss
- Frenzal Rhomb – Coughing Up a Storm
- SNFU – The One Voted Most Likely to Succeed
- Tilt – 'Til It Kills
- Satanic Surfers – Hero of Our Time
- Face to face – Big Choice

=== 1996 ===
- Misfits – Static Age
- Social Distortion – White Light, White Heat, White Trash
- Sublime – Sublime
- Choking Victim – Squatta's Paradise
- The Suicide Machines – Destruction by Definition
- NOFX – Heavy Petting Zoo / Eating Lamb LP
- Strung Out – Suburban Teenage Wasteland Blues
- Good Riddance – A Comprehensive Guide to Moderne Rebellion
- Pulley – Esteem Driven Engine
- Propagandhi – Less Talk, More Rock
- Frenzal Rhomb – Not So Tough Now
- Bad Religion – The Gray Race
- Hi-Standard – Growing Up
- SNFU – FYULABA
- Guttermouth – Teri Yakimoto
- H_{2}O – H_{2}O
- MxPx – Life in General
- Face to Face – Face to Face
- Snuff — Demmamussabebonk

=== 1997 ===
- The Dwarves – The Dwarves Are Young and Good Looking
- Green Day – Nimrod
- The Mighty Mighty Bosstones – Let's Face It
- Misfits – American Psycho
- NOFX – So Long and Thanks for All the Shoes
- Sleater-Kinney – Dig Me Out
- Will Haven – El Diablo
- Dance Hall Crashers – Honey, I'm Homely!
- Save Ferris – It Means Everything
- Pulley – 60 Cycle Hum
- No Use for a Name – Making Friends
- Ten Foot Pole – Unleashed
- Millencolin – For Monkeys
- Lagwagon – Double Plaidinum
- Blink-182 – Dude Ranch
- Frenzal Rhomb – Meet the Family
- Hi-Standard – Angry Fist
- Pennywise – Full Circle
- Me First and the Gimme Gimmes – Have a Ball
- Hi-Standard – The Kids are Alright
- Satanic Surfers – 666 Motor Inn
- H_{2}O – Thicker than Water
- The Offspring – Ixnay on the Hombre

=== 1998 ===
- Less Than Jake – Hello Rockview
- MxPx – Slowly Going the Way of the Buffalo
- The Offspring – Americana
- Rancid – Life Won't Wait
- Refused – The Shape of Punk to Come
- The Vandals – Hitler Bad, Vandals Good
- Catch 22 – Keasbey Nights
- Bad Religion – No Substance
- Strung Out – Twisted by Design
- Lagwagon – Let's Talk About Feelings
- Ten Foot Pole – Insider
- The Suicide Machines – Battle Hymns
- Good Riddance – Ballads from the Revolution
- Propagandhi – Where Quantity Is Job Number 1
- Swingin' Utters – Five Lessons Learned
- Dropkick Murphys – Do or Die
- Tilt – Collect 'Em All

=== 1999 ===
- AFI – Black Sails in the Sunset
- Blink-182 – Enema of the State
- The Get Up Kids – Something to Write Home About
- The Supersuckers – The Evil Powers of Rock 'N' Roll
- Choking Victim – No Gods / No Managers
- NOFX – The Decline
- Le Tigre – Le Tigre
- Frenzal Rhomb – A Man's Not a Camel
- No Use for a Name – More Betterness!
- Pulley – @#!*
- Dropkick Murphys – The Gang's All Here
- Hi-Standard – Making the Road
- Good Riddance – Operation Phoenix
- Millencolin – The Melancholy Collection
- Pennywise – Straight Ahead
- Me First and the Gimme Gimmes – Are a Drag
- Tilt – Viewers Like You
- Satanic Surfers – Going Nowhere Fast
- H_{2}O – F.T.T.W.
- Better Than a Thousand – Value Driven
- The Ataris — Blue skies, Broken hearts… Next 12 exits

=== 2000 ===
- Rancid – Rancid
- Green Day – Warning
- Against All Authority – 24 Hour Roadside Resistance
- Millencolin – Pennybridge Pioneers
- NOFX – Pump Up the Valuum
- Bad Religion – The New America
- Avail – One Wrench
- Strung Out – The Element of Sonic Defiance
- Lagwagon – Let's Talk About Leftovers
- Blink-182 – The Mark, Tom, and Travis Show
- Frenzal Rhomb – Shut Your Mouth
- The Kings of Nuthin' – Get Busy Livin' or Get Busy Dyin'

=== 2001 ===
- Pennywise – Land of the Free?
- Bandits of the Acoustic Revolution – A Call to Arms
- Leftöver Crack – Mediocre Generica
- Rise Against – The Unraveling
- Propagandhi – Today's Empires, Tomorrow's Ashes
- Zero Down – With a Lifetime to Pay
- Pulley – Together Again for the First Time
- Blink-182 – Take Off Your Pants and Jacket
- Good Riddance – Symptoms of a Leveling Spirit

=== 2002 ===
- Against Me! – Reinventing Axl Rose
- Dillinger Four – Situationist Comedy
- The Lawrence Arms – Apathy and Exhaustion
- Bad Religion – The Process of Belief
- Taking Back Sunday – Tell All Your Friends
- Xiu Xiu – Knife Play
- Strung Out – An American Paradox
- Green Day – Shenanigans
- No Use for a Name – Hard Rock Bottom
- Bad Astronaut – Houston: We Have a Drinking Problem
- Box Car Racer – Box Car Racer
- Millencolin – Home from Home
- The Kings of Nuthin' – Fight Songs for Fuck-Ups

=== 2003 ===
- AFI – Sing the Sorrow
- Streetlight Manifesto – Everything Goes Numb
- Thrice – The Artist in the Ambulance
- Rx Bandits – The Resignation
- Against Me! – As the Eternal Cowboy
- Rise Against – Revolutions per Minute
- Lagwagon – Blaze
- NOFX – The War on Errorism
- Blink-182 – Blink-182
- Good Riddance – Bound by Ties of Blood and Affection
- Frenzal Rhomb – Sans Souci
- Pennywise – From the Ashes

=== 2004 ===
- Rise Against – Siren Song of the Counter Culture
- Green Day – American Idiot
- Death from Above – You're a Woman, I'm a Machine
- My Chemical Romance – Three Cheers for Sweet Revenge
- Leftöver Crack – Fuck World Trade
- Bad Religion – The Empire Strikes First
- Pulley – Matters
- Strung Out – Exile in Oblivion
- Sum 41 – Chuck

=== 2005 ===
- Dropkick Murphys – The Warrior's Code
- Bomb the Music Industry! – Album Minus Band
- Against Me! – Searching for a Former Clarity
- The Academy Is... – Almost Here
- AJJ – Candy Cigarettes & Cap Guns
- Bomb the Music Industry! – To Leave or Die in Long Island
- Lagwagon – Resolve
- No Use for a Name – Keep Them Confused
- Propagandhi – Potemkin City Limits
- Millencolin – Kingwood
- Pennywise – The Fuse

=== 2006 ===
- Towers of London – Blood, Sweat and Towers
- Bomb the Music Industry! – Goodbye Cool World!
- The Arrogant Sons of Bitches – Three Cheers for Disappointment
- Jay Reatard – Blood Visions
- The Thermals – The Body, the Blood, the Machine
- Defiance, Ohio – The Great Depression
- Streetlight Manifesto – Keasbey Nights
- Bomb the Music Industry! – President's Day Split 7"
- NOFX – Wolves in Wolves' Clothing
- Bad Astronaut – Twelve Small Steps, One Giant Disappointment
- Good riddance – My Republic
- Frenzal Rhomb – Forever Malcolm Young
- The Kings of Nuthin' – Over the Counter Culture

=== 2007 ===
- Bomb the Music Industry! – Get Warmer
- AJJ – People Who Can Eat People Are the Luckiest People in the World
- Streetlight Manifesto – Somewhere in the Between
- The Gaslight Anthem – Sink or Swim
- A Wilhelm Scream – Career Suicide
- Grinderman – Grinderman
- Strung Out – Blackhawks Over Los Angeles

=== 2008 ===
- Nana Grizol – Love It Love It
- Titus Andronicus – The Airing of Grievances
- The Gaslight Anthem – The '59 Sound
- Have Heart – Songs to Scream at the Sun
- Dillinger Four – C I V I L W A R
- No Use for a Name – The Feel Good Record of the Year
- Millencolin – Machine 15
- Lagwagon – I Think My Older Brother Used to Listen to Lagwagon

=== 2009 ===
- Bomb the Music Industry! – Scrambles
- AJJ – Can't Maintain
- Defeater – Lost Ground
- Bomb the Music Industry! – Others! Others! Volume 1
- NOFX – Coaster (album)
- Propagandhi – Supporting Caste
- Strung Out – Agents of the Underground
- Green Day – 21st Century Breakdown

=== 2010 ===
- Bomb the Music Industry! – Adults!!!... Smart!!! Shithammered!!! And Excited By Nothing!!!!!!!
- Nana Grizol – Ruth
- Titus Andronicus – The Monitor
- Kvelertak – Kvelertak
- Iron Chic – Not Like This
- The Wonder Years – The Upsides
- Motion City Soundtrack – My Dinosaur Life
- The Kings of Nuthin' – Old Habits Die Hard

=== 2011 ===
- Bomb the Music Industry! – Vacation
- AJJ – Knife Man
- King Gizzard & the Lizard Wizard – Willoughby's Beach
- The Wonder Years – Suburbia I've Given You All and Now I'm Nothing
- Joyce Manor – Joyce Manor
- Frank Turner – England Keep My Bones
- Mayday Parade – Mayday Parade

=== 2012 ===
- Jeff Rosenstock – I Look Like Shit
- Cloud Nothings – Attack on Memory
- The Menzingers – On the Impossible Past
- Parquet Courts – Light Up Gold
- White Lung – Sorry
- Birds in Row – You, Me & the Violence
- Code Orange Kids – Love Is Love // Return to Dust
- Protomartyr – No Passion All Technique
- Propagandhi – Failed States

=== 2013 ===
- Days n' Daze – Rogue Taxidermy
- PUP – PUP
- Streetlight Manifesto – The Hands That Thieve
- Iron Chic – The Constant One

=== 2014 ===
- Joyce Manor – Never Hungover Again
- The Smith Street Band – Throw Me in the River
- United Nations – The Next Four Years
- Against Me! – Transgender Dysphoria Blues
- White Lung – Deep Fantasy
- Protomartyr – Under Color of Official Right
- Modern Baseball – You're Gonna Miss It All
- Lagwagon – Hang
- Green Day – Demolicious

=== 2015 ===
- Jeff Rosenstock – We Cool?
- Antarctigo Vespucci – Leavin' La Vida Loca
- Kid Cudi – Speedin' Bullet 2 Heaven
- Frank Carter & The Rattlesnakes – Blossom
- The Wonder Years – No Closer to Heaven
- Leftöver Crack – Constructs of the State
- Titus Andronicus – The Most Lamentable Tragedy
- Frank Turner – Positive Songs for Negative People
- Beach Slang – The Things We Do to Find People Who Feel Like Us
- Knuckle Puck – Copacetic
- PWR BTTM – Ugly Cherries
- Harm's Way – Rust
- Strung out – Transmission.Alpha.Delta

=== 2016 ===
- Jeff Rosenstock – WORRY.
- PUP – The Dream Is Over
- AJJ – The Bible 2
- Green Day – Revolution Radio
- Blink-182 – California
- Knocked Loose – Laugh Tracks
- White Lung – Paradise
- Against Me! – Shape Shift with Me
- Pierce the Veil – Misadventures
- NOFX – First Ditch Effort
- Violent Femmes – We Can Do Anything
- Waterparks – Double Dare
- Descendents – Hypercaffium Spazzinate

=== 2017 ===
- Dead Cross – Dead Cross
- The Menzingers – After the Party
- The Smith Street Band – More Scared of You Than You Are of Me
- Propagandhi – Victory Lap
- Rancid – Trouble Maker
- Iron Chic – You Can't Stay Here

=== 2018 ===
- Jeff Rosenstock – POST-
- Antarctigo Vespucci – Love in the Time of E-Mail
- Idles – Joy as an Act of Resistance
- Tropical Fuck Storm – A Laughing Death in Meatspace
- Turnstile – Time & Space
- Birds in Row – We Already Lost the World
- Superchunk – What a Time to Be Alive
- Hot Snakes – Jericho Sirens
- Alkaline Trio – Is This Thing Cursed?

=== 2019 ===
- PUP – Morbid Stuff
- Tropical Fuck Storm – Braindrops
- Amyl and the Sniffers – Amyl and the Sniffers
- Bad Religion – Age of Unreason
- Prince Daddy & The Hyena – Cosmic Thrill Seekers
- Sum 41 – Order in Decline
- Titus Andronicus – An Obelisk
- The Menzingers – Hello Exile
- Lagwagon – Railer
- Strung Out – Songs of Armor and Devotion

=== 2020 ===
- Jeff Rosenstock – NO DREAM
- Dogleg – Melee
- Idles – Ultra Mono
- PUP – This Place Sucks Ass

=== 2021 ===
- NOFX – Single Album

=== 2024 ===
- Green Day – Saviors

=== 2025 ===
- PUP – Who Will Look After The Dogs?

=== 2026 ===
- The Molotovs - Wasted on Youth

== See also ==
- Lists of albums
- Timeline of punk rock
