= Wrecktrospective =

Compilation album by Fat Wreck Chords
- Released: December 8, 2009
- Recorded: 1992–2008
- Genre: Punk rock
- Label: Fat Wreck Chords
- Producer: Fat Mike, Chad Williams

Fat Wreck Chords chronology
Protect: A Benefit for the National Association to Protect Children (2005)	Wrecktrospective (2009)	Harder, Fatter + Louder! (2010)

Wrecktrospective is a three-disc compilation album released December 8, 2009 by Fat Wreck Chords. Subtitled "Twenty Years...and Counting!", it compiles tracks spanning the label's catalog from 1990 to 2009. The first disc, titled Fattest Hits, collects songs from 33 of the label's album releases. The second disc, Demos, includes 28 demo recordings and rare tracks, a majority of which are previously unreleased. The third disc, Fat Club, includes all of the tracks from the Fat Club series of 7-inch singles released monthly by the label from February 2001 to January 2002. In total the compilation includes 88 songs by 51 different artists.

== Critical reception ==
Professional ratings
Review scores
Source	Rating
Allmusic	3.5/5 stars

James Christopher Monger of Allmusic remarked that Wrecktrospective "sums up the record company’s devotion to all things punk, as in classic, pop, and skatepunk, alternative folk, post-punk, and screamo. A decent balance of the old guard and the new (from the Descendents to Against Me!) keeps things fresh and fun, while the relative brevity of punk songs in general makes for a truly stocked jukebox of high-energy, high-quality, classically minded modern punk."

== Track listing ==
Disc 1: Fattest Hits
No.	Title	Writer(s)	Artist	Length
1.	"The Separation of Church and Skate" (from The War on Errorism, 2003)	Fat Mike	NOFX	2:49
2.	"Violins" (from Hoss, 1995)	Joey Cape	Lagwagon	3:05
3.	"Back to the Motor League" (from Today's Empires, Tomorrow's Ashes, 2001)	Chris Hannah, Jord Samolesky, Todd Kowalski	Propagandhi	2:37
4.	"Soulmate" (from ¡Leche con Carne!, 1995)	Tony Sly	No Use for a Name	3:03
5.	"2RAK005" (from Stinky Fingers, 1994)	Marty Gregori, Larry Tinney, Zack Charlos, Ray Castro	Bracket	2:32
6.	"Too Close to See" (from Twisted by Design, 1998)	Jason Cruz, Jake Kiley, Rob Ramos, Jordan Burns, Jim Cherry	Strung Out	2:55
7.	"You've Done Nothing" (from Don't Turn Away, 1992)	Trever Keith, Matt Riddle	Face to Face	2:00
8.	"Weight of the World" (from A Comprehensive Guide to Moderne Rebellion, 1996)	Luke Pabich, Russ Rankin	Good Riddance	1:44
9.	"War Room" (from Viewers Like You, 1999)	Jeffrey Bischoff	Tilt	2:26
10.	"Leaving on a Jet Plane" (from Denver, 1995; originally performed by John Denver)	John Denver	Me First and the Gimme Gimmes	2:32
11.	"Raum der Zeit" (from Uuaarrgh!, 1994)	Axel Kurth, Jörn Genserowski, Charly Zasko	Wizo	1:40
12.	"Never Had So Much Fun" (from A Man's Not a Camel, 1999)	Jason Whalley, Lindsay McDougall, Gordy Forman, Lex Feltham	Frenzal Rhomb	2:01
13.	"Wait for the Sun" (from Growing Up, 1996)	Akihiro Nanba, Ken Yokoyama, Akira Tsuneoka	Hi-Standard	2:20
14.	"Martin" (from Demmamussabebonk, 1996)	Duncan Redmonds, Loz Wong, Andy Crighton	Snuff	2:12
15.	"Easy Life" (from Vacation, 1996)	Simon Robert Sandall	Goober Patrol	2:52
16.	"Windspitting Punk" (from A Juvenile Product of the Working Class, 1996)	Darius Koski, Goddard, Johnny Bonnel, Max Huber	Swingin' Utters	2:15
17.	"Cool Kids" (from Bark Like a Dog, 1996)	Ben Weasel	Screeching Weasel	2:12
18.	"Mary Melody" (from Rock the Plank, 2001)	Sascha Lazor, Chuck Robertson	Mad Caddies	3:09
19.	"Brutal Tooth" (from Breakfast at Pappa's, 1998)	Steve Ford, Mike Ford, Baz Barrett, Chris Billam	Consumed	1:34
20.	"The Bland Within" (from Yours Truly, 2000)	Lou Koller, Pete Koller, Craig Setari, Armand Majidi	Sick of It All	2:09
21.	"Black and Red" (from Front Porch Stories, 2002)	Tim Barry, Joe Banks, Gwomper, Ed Trask, Beau Beau Butler	Avail	2:15
22.	"Gainesville Rock City" (from Borders & Boundaries, 2000)	Chris Demakes, Roger Manganelli, Vinnie Fiorello, Buddy Schaub, Pete Anna	Less Than Jake	3:08
23.	"Turncoat" (from The Terror State, 2003)	Justin Sane, Chris Head, Chris #2, Pat Thetic	Anti-Flag	2:11
24.	"Heaven Knows" (from Revolutions per Minute, 2003)	Tim McIlrath, Todd Mohney, Joe Principe, Brandon Barnes	Rise Against	3:23
25.	"Kings of Fife" (from Off the Leash, 2008)	Paul McKenzie, Kurt Robertson, Gord Taylor, Sean Sellers, Mark Boland, Gwomper	The Real McKenzies	2:50
26.	"Like a Record Player" (from Oh! Calcutta!, 2006)	Chris McCaughan, Brendan Kelly, Neil Hennessy	The Lawrence Arms	2:01
27.	"Americaspremierefaithbasedinitiative" (from Civil War, 2008)	Patrick Costello, Erik Funk, Bill Morrisette, Lane Pederson	Dillinger Four	3:10
28.	"Everyday Balloons" (from File Under Black, 2003)	Jason Shevchuk, Paul Delaney, Jeff Shevchuk, Mike McEvoy	None More Black	1:53
29.	"T.S.R." (from Against Me! as the Eternal Cowboy, 2003)	Laura Jane Grace, James Bowman, Andrew Seward, Warren Oakes	Against Me!	1:35
30.	"'Merican" (from Cool to Be You, 2004)	Karl Alvarez	Descendents	1:52
31.	"R.J.R." (from To the Nines, 2004)	Rankin, Zach Blair, Aaron Dalbec, Doni Blair, Bill Stevenson	Only Crime	2:05
32.	"I Remember You" (from Pink Razors, 2005)	KJ Jansen	Chixdiggit!	2:34
33.	"By the Throat" (from Cuban Ballerina, 2006)	Tyson Annicharico, Jack Dalrymple, Brandon Pollack, Ian Anderson	Dead to Me	2:22

Disc 2: Demos
No.	Title	Writer(s)	Artist	Length
1.	"Flies First Class" (demo for For God and Country, 1995)	Rankin, Pabich, Chuck Platt, Rich McDermott	Good Riddance	2:48
2.	"Alive and Well" (demo for The Unraveling, 2001)	McIlrath, Principe, Dan Wleklinski, Dan Lumley	Rise Against	2:04
3.	"Eulogy" (demo for The Great Awake, 2007)	Scott Brigham, Chris Cresswell, Jon Darbey, Paul Ramirez	The Flatliners	3:26
4.	"It's My Job to Keep Punk Rock Elite" (outtake from Fuck the Kids sessions, 1996)	Fat Mike	NOFX	1:10
5.	"On with the Show" (demo for The Greatest Story Ever Told, 2003)	McCaughan, Kelly, Hennessy	The Lawrence Arms	1:25
6.	"Bury the Hatchet" (demo for Duh, 1992)	Cape, Chris Flippin, Shawn Dewey, Jesse Buglione, Derrick Plourde	Lagwagon	3:33
7.	"The Church of Black Flag" (demo for Cognicide, 2005)	Jason Hall, Ken Yamazaki, Chicken Annicharico, Chad Williams	Western Addiction	2:09
8.	"Living Will (Get You Dead)" (demo for Keep Your Heart, 2006)	Dave Hause, Michael Cotterman, Mike Sneeringer	The Loved Ones	2:06
9.	"Immigrants & Hypocrites" (demo for Until We're Dead, 2008)	Stza, Nico de Gaillo, Frank Piegaro, Yula Beeri, Ara Babajian	Star Fucking Hipsters	2:37
10.	"Everyone Is Telling Me I'll Never Win, If I Fall in Love with a Girl from Marin" (acoustic demo for When All Else Fails, 2000)	Gregori, Charlos, Castro, Angelo Celli	Bracket	3:24
11.	"Sons of Avarice" (demo for Destroy Their Future, 2007)	Rory Henderson, Ryan Massey, John Peck, Scott Healy	American Steel	3:44
12.	"5000 Ways to Die" (demo for How to Meet Girls, 2000)	Parry Gripp	Nerf Herder	2:53
13.	"Middle Finger Response" (demo for How to Clean Everything, 1993)	Hannah, Samolesky, John K. Samson	Propagandhi	2:54
14.	"Slytherin? My Ass!" (demo for This Is Satire, 2006)	Delaney, Jason Shevchuk, Colin McGinniss, Jared Shavelson	None More Black	2:18
15.	"A Promise to Distinction" (demo for Five Lessons Learned, 1998)	Darius Koski	Swingin' Utters	2:07
16.	"You Look Like I Need a Drink" (acoustic demo for Against Me! as the Eternal Cowboy, 2003)	Grace, Bowman, Seward, Oakes	Against Me!	2:43
17.	"Multiply and Divide" (demo for LP III, 2005)	Annie Holoien, Maren Macosko, Danny Henry, Susy Sharp	The Soviettes	2:30
18.	"No Apologies" (demo for With a Lifetime to Pay, 2001)	Cherry, John McCree, Milo Todesco	Zero Down	2:29
19.	"Always Carrie" (demo for More Betterness!, 1999)	Sly	No Use for a Name	2:41
20.	"Writing Letters" (demo for Cuban Ballerina, 2006)	Annicharico, Dalrymple, Pollack, Anderson	Dead to Me	2:52
21.	"Alone" (demo for Another Day in Paradise, 1994)	Cruz, Kiley, Ramos, Burns, Cherry	Strung Out	2:33
22.	"My Pop the Cop" (demo for All This and Puppet Stew, 2001)	Stan Lee, Leonard Graves Phillips	The Dickies	2:27
23.	"Done Reckoning" (demo for Front Porch Stories, 2002)	Barry, Banks, Gwomper, Trask, Butler	Avail	1:36
24.	"Polyester Khakis" (demo for Quality Soft Core, 1997)	Lazor, Carter Benson, Eduardo Hernandez	Mad Caddies	2:21
25.	"Hau Weg die Scheisse" (demo for Dancing for Decadence, 2006)	Hugo Mudie, Fred Jacques, Louis Valiquette, Marc-André Beaudet	The Sainte Catherines	2:26
26.	"It's You" (demo for Stop the Future, 2005)	Fritz M. Static, Viz Spectrum, Roxy Epoxy, Shock Diode, Ray Cathode	Epoxies	2:35
27.	"Goodbye to Boston" (demo for Above the City, 2005)	Jeremy Cochran, Ken Gurley, Nick Maggiore, Joe McMahon	Smoke or Fire	2:24
28.	"Underground Network" (demo for Underground Network, 2001)	Sane	Anti-Flag	3:56

Disc 3: Fat Club
No.	Title	Writer(s)	Artist	Length
1.	"Underground"	Dave Quackenbush	The Vandals	3:39
2.	"Why Are You Alive?"	Warren Fitzgerald	The Vandals	2:34
3.	"Middle of the Night"	Henderson, Massey, Peck, Healy	American Steel	4:00
4.	"New Religion Everyday"	Henderson, Massey, Peck, Healy	American Steel	3:17
5.	"Another Round"	McKenzie, Robertson, Taylor, Sellers, Boland, Gwomper	The Real McKenzies	2:39
6.	"Loch Lomond"	traditional	The Real McKenzies	3:20
7.	"The Road Less Traveled"	Mike Herrera	MxPx	3:01
8.	"You Hold the Key"	Herrera	MxPx	2:49
9.	"Antidote"	Thomas Barnett, Matt Smith, Garth Petrie, Eric Kane, Matt Sherwood	Strike Anywhere	3:45
10.	"Asleep"	Barnett, Smith, Petrie, Kane, Sherwood	Strike Anywhere	2:33
11.	"I'm Stepping Out"	Fredrik Granberg, Johan Gustafsson, Stefan Granberg, Johan Brändström	Randy	3:07
12.	"Unite"	F. Granberg, Gustafsson, S. Granberg, Brändström	Randy	2:26
13.	"Freedom Song"	F. Granberg, Gustafsson, S. Granberg, Brändström	Randy	3:15
14.	"Zyclone B Bath House"	Fat Mike	NOFX	1:40
15.	"Spaghetti Motel"	Fat Mike, Bill Bartell	NOFX	1:58
16.	"Black Mountain Rain"	Koski	Swingin' Utters	1:44
17.	"Outside Life"	Koski	Swingin' Utters	2:00
18.	"Dig"	Cruz, Kiley, Ramos, Burns, Chris Aiken	Strung Out	2:54
19.	"Lost Motel"	Cruz, Kiley, Ramos, Burns, Aiken	Strung Out	3:59
20.	"The Promise Breakers"	David Jones	Enemy You	1:07
21.	"Kind Hearts"	Jones	Enemy You	2:28
22.	"Emma"	Jones	Enemy You	2:38
23.	"Porno and Snuff Films"	McCaughan, Kelly, Hennessy	The Lawrence Arms	2:34
24.	"A Toast"	McCaughan, Kelly, Hennessy	The Lawrence Arms	2:33
25.	"Overheated"	McCaughan, Kelly, Hennessy	The Lawrence Arms	4:18
26.	"Victoria"	One Man Army	One Man Army	2:32
27.	"She Wants Me Dead"	One Man Army	One Man Army	2:04
