= Prototypes and Painkillers =

Compilation album by Strung Out
- Released: March 31, 2009
- Genre: Pop-punk; heavy metal
- Label: Fat Wreck Chords

Strung Out chronology
Blackhawks Over Los Angeles (2007)	Prototypes and Painkillers (2009)	Agents of the Underground (2009)

Prototypes and Painkillers is a compilation album by the punk rock band Strung Out, released on March 31, 2009, by Fat Wreck Chords. It consists of outtakes, demos, and compilation tracks taken from various recording sessions over the course of the band's career, including several previously unreleased tracks.

== Track listing ==
All tracks are written by Strung Out except where noted.

No.	Title	Length
1.	"Don't Look Back" (2001; b-side from An American Paradox sessions, released on limited edition of album)	2:41
2.	"Novacain" (2000; b-side from The Element of Sonic Defiance sessions; released on Live Fat, Die Young)	2:53
3.	"I'm Not a Loser" (1992; written by Frank Navetta and originally performed by the Descendents; previously unreleased)	1:28
4.	"Novella" (2007; b-side from Blackhawks Over Los Angeles sessions; released on iTunes version of album)	3:00
5.	"Lost Motel" (2000; An American Paradox demo; released on Fat Club 7-inch single)	4:00
6.	"Pleather" (1999; An American Paradox demo; previously unreleased)	3:01
7.	"Klawsterfobia" (1999; from Short Music for Short People)	0:31
8.	"Ghost Town" (1997; b-side from Twisted by Design sessions; released on Crossroads and Illusions)	2:07
9.	"Bark at the Moon" (2002; written and originally performed by Ozzy Osbourne; from Punk Goes Metal)	3:32
10.	"Sinner or Coward?" (1992; previously unreleased)	1:39
11.	"Season of the Witch" (1994; released on Strung Out / Jughead's Revenge split 7-inch single)	2:49
12.	"Your Worst Mistake" (2001; b-side from An American Paradox sessions; released on Uncontrollable Fatulence)	3:26
13.	"Betrayal" (2002; from Beyond Cyberpunk)	2:50
14.	"More Than Words" (2007; b-side from Blackhawks Over Los Angeles sessions; released on limited edition of album)	3:29
15.	"Barfly" (1997; b-side from Twisted by Design sessions; released on Crossroads and Illusions)	3:11
16.	"Night of the Necro" (1999; previously unreleased)	2:10
17.	"American Lie" (1994; released on As a Matter of Fact)	2:34
18.	"Dig" (2000; demo version for An American Paradox; released on Fat Club 7-inch single)	2:55
19.	"Wrong Side of the Tracks" (1996; demo version; released on Punk Bites; re-recorded for Suburban Teenage Wasteland Blues)	2:49
20.	"Just Like Me" (1997; demo version; released on Punk Bites 2; re-recorded for Twisted by Design)	2:08
21.	"Mad Mad World" (1992; demo version; previously unreleased; re-recorded for Another Day in Paradise)	2:16
22.	"Jacqueline" (1996; demo from Suburban Teenage Wasteland Blues sessions; released on Fearless Flush Sampler; re-recorded for The Element of Sonic Defiance as "Jackie-O")	2:32
23.	"Velvet Alley" (2003; acoustic version; from Punk Goes Acoustic)	4:19
24.	"Ashes" (1992; demo version; previously unreleased; re-recorded for Another Day in Paradise)	2:42
25.	"Forever Is Today" (1992; previously unreleased)	2:20
