= Jason Cruz =

American singer

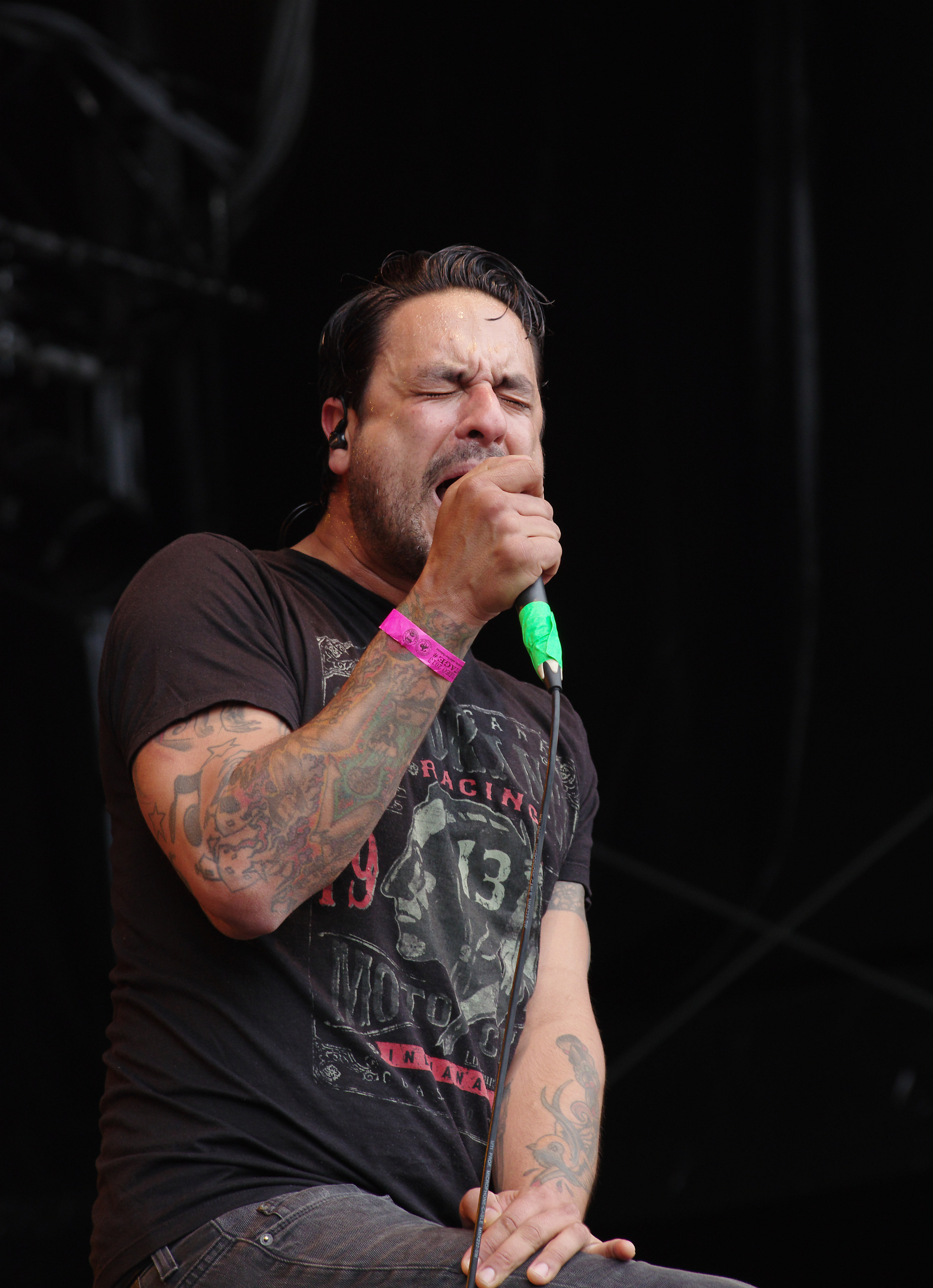
- Cruz in 2013

Background information
- Born: February 6, 1974 (age 52); Los Angeles, California, U.S.
- Origin: Ventura, California, U.S.
- Genres: Melodic hardcore, skate punk, goth country
- Occupations: Singer, songwriter, artist
- Years active: 1990–present
- Member of: Strung Out

Jason Alexander Cruz (born February 6, 1974) is the American singer best known as the frontman of the punk band Strung Out, which formed in 1990 when he was 17 years old. He is also an artist and a poet and fronts his roots Americana band Jason Cruz and Howl. His personal website showcases his various forms of original artwork (paintings as well as graphic design and photography).

== Biography ==
Cruz grew up in and around Los Angeles. He focused his energies on art and creative writing in school and began playing with Strung Out in 1989 in Southern California.

Jason's major influences include classic artists such as Tom Waits, Jimi Hendrix, Hank Williams Sr, William Burroughs, Charles Bukowski, and Bob Dylan and visual artists Robert Mcginnis and Jean-Michel Basquiat. He has said that he was influenced by the desert, dirt road swap meets and the melancholy music that his mother used to listen to when he was growing up. The first concert he ever went to was Depeche Mode in 1986 when he was 12 years old then graduated to punk rock shows and skateboarding.

Jason apprenticed as a tattoo artist for two years then took up oil Painting under the moniker 'Amerikan Blackheart'.

Cruz provided lead vocals and wrote the lyrics for T4 Project, a band made up of many well-known punk musicians, for its 2008 "Story-Based Concept Album."

On August 21, 2012, Cruz self-released his first solo record titled Loungecore under the name Jason Cruz and Howl.

== Discography ==
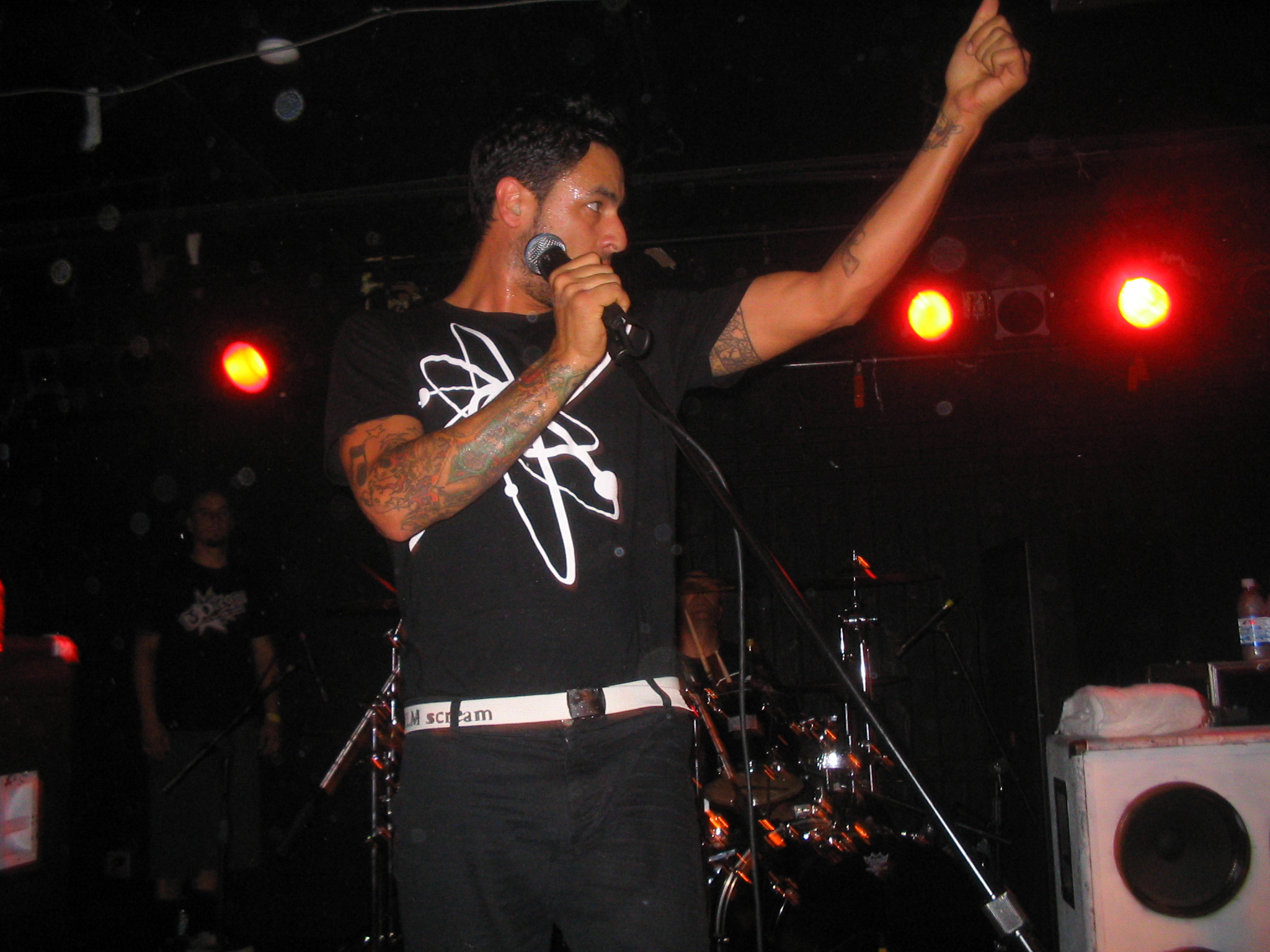
Cruz in 2007

=== Strung Out ===
See Strung Out for full list

- Another Day in Paradise (1994)
- Suburban Teenage Wasteland Blues (1996)
- Twisted by Design (1998)
- The Element of Sonic Defiance (2000)
- An American Paradox (2002)
- Exile In Oblivion (2004)
- Blackhawks Over Los Angeles (2007)
- Agents of the Underground (2009)
- Transmission.Alpha.Delta (2015)
- Black Out The Sky (2018)
- Songs of Armor and Devotion (2019)
- Dead Rebellion (2024)

=== T4 Project ===
- Story-Based Concept Album (2008)

=== Jason Cruz and Howl ===
- Loungecore (2012)
- Good Man's Ruin (2014)
- Wolves (2023)
