= Got Your Back (album) =

Studio album by Pour Habit
- Released: April 12, 2011
- Genre: Punk rock
- Label: Fat Wreck Chords

Pour Habit chronology
| Suiticide (2007) | Got Your Back (2011) |

Got Your Back (2011) is Pour Habit's second full-length album released through Fat Wreck Chords in 2011.

== Track listing ==
1. "Dead Soldier’s Bay"
2. "Heads of State"
3. "Greenery"
4. "Matter of Opinion"
5. "East 69th"
6. "Head in the Clouds (Danny’s Song)"
7. "Party"
8. "Teens Turned to Fiends"
9. "Tomahawk"
10. "For All Who Have Given and Lost"
11. "Gutterblock Boy"
12. "The Expert"
13. "Conscience Mind of Revelation"
