= Suiticide =

Studio album by Pour Habit
- Released: May 26, 2009
- Genres: Punk rock, melodic hardcore
- Label: Fat Wreck Chords

Pour Habit chronology
Suiticide (2009)	Got Your Back (2011)

Suiticide (2007) is Pour Habit's debut full-length album, originally self-released, and has been re-released through Fat Wreck Chords in 2009.

== Track listing ==
1. "Institution"
2. "Light The Torch"
3. "Against Me"
4. "Resignation"
5. "Misfigured"
6. "Bad Luck Drunk"
7. "Evolution"
8. "You Suck" (only on the 2007 release)
9. "Hell Bent"
10. "Zion"
11. "Real Eyes"
12. "Suiticide"
13. "Tomahawk" (Japanese bonus track)
14. "Gutterblock Boy" (Japanese bonus track)
