= Songs of Armor and Devotion =

Studio album by Strung Out
- Released: August 9, 2019
- Studios: Maple Sound Studios, Santa Ana, California
- Genres: Punk metal; melodic hardcore; hardcore punk; skate punk
- Length: 43:55
- Label: Fat Wreck Chords
- Producer: Cameron Webb

Strung Out chronology
Transmission.Alpha.Delta (2015)	Songs of Armor and Devotion (2019)	Dead Rebellion (2024)

Professional ratings
Review scores
Source	Rating
AllMusic	3.5/5 stars
Hysteria Magazine	7/10 stars
Punknews.org	4/5 stars

Songs of Armor and Devotion is the ninth studio album from the American punk band Strung Out. It was released on August 9, 2019 through Fat Wreck Chords on CD and LP. Songs of Armor and Devotion is the only album to feature drummer RJ Shankle, prior to his departure in July 2022. It was generally received well by critics. Shortly after, two collaboration beers was released with Lucky Luke Brewing Company (Palmdale, CA) in conjunction with the album release. One named “Armor” an IPA and “Devotion” a citrus wheat beer.

== Background ==
Fat Wreck Chords announced the album on June 4, 2019, after frontman Jason Cruz already revealed the name of the new album, Songs of Armor and Devotion, on May 15 on Episode 15 of the Dying Scene Podcast. A song on the new album, "Daggers", was released the same day. A US tour with The Casualties in the fall of 2019 was announced on June 11.

A new song called "Under the Western Sky" was released with an accompanying music video on July 10. The entire album was made available for streaming on August 7, two days before the official release.

== Track listing ==
1. "Rebels and Saints" - 3:54
2. "Daggers" - 4:06
3. "Ulysses" - 4:12
4. "Under the Western Sky" - 3:51
5. "Monuments" - 2:45
6. "White Girls" - 2:42
7. "Demons" - 3:38
8. "Hammer Down" - 3:07
9. "Disappearing City" - 2:49
10. "Politics of Sleep" - 3:10
11. "Diamonds and Gold" - 3:11
12. "Strange Notes" - 2:45
13. "Bloody Knuckles" - 3:45

== Performers ==
- Chris Aiken - bass
- RJ Shankle - drums
- Jake Kiley - guitar
- Rob Ramos - guitar, vocals
- Jason Cruz - vocals

== Charts ==
Chart (2019)	Peak position
US Heatseekers Albums (Billboard)	3
US Independent Albums (Billboard)	10
US Top Album Sales (Billboard)	58
US Vinyl Albums (Billboard)	17
