= Under the Influence of Bad People =

Studio album by Screw 32
- Released: February 11, 1997
- Studio: Fat Planet Studios, Van Nuys, California; Pyramind Studios, San Francisco, California; and Razor's Edge Recording, San Francisco, California
- Genre: Punk rock
- Length: 29:08
- Label: Fat Wreck Chords
- Producer: Fat Mike; Ryan Greene; Screw 32

Screw 32 chronology
Unresolved Childhood Issues (1995)	Under the Influence of Bad People (1997)

Professional ratings
Review scores
Source	Rating
Punknews.org	4/5 stars

Under the Influence of Bad People is an album by Screw 32, released in 1997 on Fat Wreck Chords.

== Track listing ==
1. My Crazy Life
2. Misunderstood
3. Broken
4. Something You Said
5. Don't Let Them Take You Alive
6. Black Marker
7. Paint the Town Red
8. Sick to Death
9. Sticks and Stones
10. Painless
11. One Time Angels
12. Responsibility
