= Screw 32 =

American punk band

- Labels: Fat Wreck Chords, BYO Records, Harvcore Records, Wingnut Records, Halfpint Records
- Past members: Andrew Champion; Doug Sangalang; Jimi Cheetah; Grant McIntire; Josh Kilbourn; Mark Mortenson; Jamie Morrison

Screw 32 was a Berkeley/East Bay-area US punk rock band. Their name has many supposed origins, the most popular stating that it is derived from an anti-skateboarding measure on the ballot in Concord, California. They were noted for their self-publicity and ordered stickers by the thousands, sticking them in numerous places. They were also known to "tag" their names with Sharpies on numerous objects and in numerous places.

Members of the band later played in several other bands; vocalist Andrew Champion went on to Hopelifter, End of the World, Shadowboxer, and Highwire Days; guitarist Doug Sangalang played with Limp, One Time Angels, and Jackson United; and bass player Jimi Cheetah played in Tilt and Nothing Cool, as well as running Cheetah's Records. Guitarist Grant McIntire and drummer Mark Mortenson had a brief stint in Me First and the Gimme Gimmes, while Mark Mortenson played in the bands Grinch and Samiam. Grant McIntire and Andrew also played in the band Dance Hall Crashers.

Screw 32's music has been likened to that of the Bouncing Souls, AFI, and Dag Nasty.

== Members ==
Andrew Champion, Douglas Sangalang, Jimi Cheetah (McCluskey), Grant McIntire, and Josh Kilbourn are the original members of the band. Jamie Morrison played a few tours and a lot of shows in between Josh and ultimately Mark Mortenson who played on their last record and all of their remaining shows, recordings, and tours.

== Discography ==
- 1994: This is Berkeley, Not West Bay compilation 7" with AFI, Black Fork, and Dead and Gone – (Zafio Records)
- 1994: Old Idea, New Head b/w Tightrope – (Scooter's Records)
- 1994: Why Are We So Fucked Up All the Time? 7" – (Harvcore Records)
- 1995: Split 7" with Youth Brigade – (BYO Records)
- 1995: Unresolved Childhood Issues – (Wingnut Records)
- 1996: Split 7" with Fury 66 – (Half Pint Records)
- 1997: Under the Influence of Bad People – (Fat Wreck Chords)
- 2016: Sell The Heart Records Fugazi compilation, 'Public Witness Program'
