= Pour Habit =

American punk rock band

- Origin: Long Beach, California, United States
- Genres: Punk rock; Melodic Hardcore
- Years active: 2004-2018
- Label: Fat Wreck Chords
- Members: Chuck Green; Matt Hawkes; Colin Walsh; Eric Walsh; Steve Williams
- Past members: Shaun Nix

Pour Habit are an American punk rock band from Compton, California. In 2007, the band released its first album, Suiticide. After signing to Fat Wreck Chords in 2009, the album was re-released on the label that same year. Their next album, Got Your Back, was released on April 12, 2011. The band released no new music after 2011.

The band was sued in 2011 after a person got hurt in a crowdsurfing incident at a concert.

== Current members ==
- Chuck Green (Vocals)
- Matt Hawks (Guitar)
- Colin Walsh (Drums)
- Eric Walsh (Guitar, Vocals)
- Steve Williams (Bass, Vocals)

== Former members ==
- Shaun Nix (Guitar)

== Discography ==
=== Albums ===
- 2007 Suiticide
- 2011 Got Your Back

=== Music videos ===
- "Evolution" (2007)
- "Heads of State" (2011)
- "Hell Bent" (2011)
