= Suburban Teenage Wasteland Blues =

Studio album by Strung Out
- Released: April 23, 1996
- Recorded: Rumbo Recorders, Razor's Edge, Fat Planet
- Genres: Punk rock; punk metal
- Length: 32:41
- Label: Fat Wreck Chords

Strung Out chronology
Another Day in Paradise (1994)	Suburban Teenage Wasteland Blues (1996)	Twisted by Design (1998)

Professional ratings
Review scores
Source	Rating
punknews.org	5/5 stars

Suburban Teenage Wasteland Blues is the second album by American punk rock band Strung Out, released by Fat Wreck Chords on April 23, 1996. The title is an amalgamation of Bob Dylan's song "Subterranean Homesick Blues" and a phrase from the song "Baba O'Riley" by The Who. The album received positive reviews from critics and fans alike.

It was remastered and re-released on April 15, 2014 as part of the first volume of Strung Out's 20th anniversary box set.

== Track listing ==
All lyrics by Jason Cruz, all leads by Rob Ramos except "Firecracker" by Jake Kiley

1. "Firecracker" – 2:52 (Jim, Jake)
2. "Better Days" – 2:24 (Jake, Rob)
3. "Solitaire" – 2:53 (Rob)
4. "Never Good Enough" – 2:18 (Jake, Rob)
5. "Gear Box" – 3:31 (Jake, Rob)
6. "Monster" – 2:21 (Jim, Rob)
7. "Bring Out Your Dead" – 2:51 (Jim, Rob)
8. "Rottin' Apple" – 2:28 (Jim, Rob)
9. "Radio Suicide" – 2:13 (Jim)
10. "Somnombulance" – 2:23 (Jim, Rob)
11. "Six Feet" – 1:45 (Jim, Jake)
12. "Speed Ball" – 2:02 (Rob)
13. "Wrong Side of the Tracks" – 2:40 (Rob)

== Personnel ==
- Jason Cruz – vocals, cover design
- Jake Kiley – guitar
- Rob Ramos – guitar
- Jordan Burns – drums
- Jim Cherry – bass
- Max Norman – mixing
- Shawn Burman – engineer
- Ryan Greene – engineer
- Winni – cover design
