= Transmission.Alpha.Delta =

Studio album by Strung Out
- Released: March 24, 2015
- Genre: Melodic hardcore; thrash metal
- Length: 43:47
- Label: Fat Wreck Chords
- Producer: Kyle Black

Strung Out chronology
Agents of the Underground (2009)	Transmission.Alpha.Delta (2015)	Songs of Armor and Devotion (2019)

Professional ratings
Review scores
Source	Rating
New Noise magazine	5/5 stars
Sputnikmusic	3.8/5 stars
Inyourspeakers Media	(52/100)
By the Barricade	5/5 stars

Transmission.Alpha.Delta is the eighth studio album from American punk band, Strung Out. It was released on March 24, 2015, through Fat Wreck Chords. The album is their highest charting to date, reaching number 144 on the Billboard 200.

== Track listing ==
1. "Rats in the Walls" - 3:32
2. "Rebellion of the Snakes" - 3:39
3. "The Animal and the Machine" - 3:13
4. "Modern Drugs" - 3:38
5. "Black Maps" - 4:15
6. "Spanish Days" - 3:16
7. "Tesla" - 4:03
8. "Nowheresville" - 3:54
9. "Magnolia" - 3:24
10. "Go It Alone" - 3:10
11. "No Apologies" - 3:20
12. "Westcoasttrendkill"- 4:23

== Charts ==
Chart (2015)	Peak position
US Billboard 200	144
