= The Element of Sonic Defiance =

EP by Strung Out
- Released: June 20, 2000
- Recorded: February 2000
- Genre: Melodic hardcore
- Length: 24:59
- Label: Fat Wreck Chords
- Producer: Ryan Greene

Strung Out chronology
Twisted by Design (1998)	The Element of Sonic Defiance (2000)	An American Paradox (2002)

The Element of Sonic Defiance is an EP by American punk band Strung Out, released on Fat Wreck Chords in June 2000.

Professional ratings
Review scores
Source	Rating
Allmusic	3/5 stars

== Track listing ==
1. "Mission to Mars" – 2:37 (Jake Kiley)
2. "Scarecrow" – 2:14 (Jake)
3. "Savant" – 3:21 (Jake)
4. "Blew" – 4:33 (Rob Ramos, Jake)
5. "Everyday" – 2:22 (Rob)
6. "Razorblade" – 3:59 (Rob, Jake)
7. "Jackie-O" – 3:02 (Jake)
8. "Mephisto" – 2:51 (Jason Cruz, Jake)

"Andre's Circus", as fans have dubbed it, is appended to the end of "Blew". The speech is an excerpt from the movie My Dinner with Andre.

== Miscellaneous ==
- All of the leads are by Rob Ramos except for "Scarecrow", which is by Jake Kiley.
- "Scarecrow" and "Mephisto" were featured in the PlayStation 2 game ATV Offroad Fury.
- "Everyday" was featured in the opening credits of the PlayStation 2 game ESPN Winter X-Games Snowboarding.
- The album was recorded in February 2000.

== Credits ==
- Jason Cruz – vocals, art direction, design
- Jake Kiley – guitar
- Rob Ramos – guitar
- Chris Aiken – bass
- Jordan Burns – drums
- Ramon Breton – mastering
- Adam Krammer – assistant
- Nick Rubenstein – art direction, design
