= The Decline (EP) =

EP by NOFX
- Released: November 23, 1999
- Recorded: June 1999
- Genres: Punk rock, skate punk
- Length: 18:19
- Label: Fat Wreck Chords
- Producers: Fat Mike, Ryan Greene

NOFX chronology
Timmy the Turtle (1999)	The Decline (1999)	Pump Up the Valuum (2000)

Professional ratings
Review scores
Source	Rating
AbsolutePunk	(85%) link
AllMusic	link
Punknews.org	link
Ox-Fanzine	Favorable

The Decline is an EP by NOFX. It was released on November 23, 1999. The CD version consisted of only the 18-minute title track, but the vinyl included a different version of "Clams Have Feelings Too" (from Pump Up the Valuum) on the B-side. The Decline is largely a satire of American politics and law, with an overwhelming concern for blind behaviors of the masses, such as complacency, indifference, gun violence, drug-use, and conformity, as well as destruction of constitutional rights, and condemnation of the religious right. Although the lyrics are somewhat disjointed, they all refer back to the unifying theme of the "decline" of America. The trombone is played by Lars Nylander of Skankin' Pickle.

According to the band,

[The recording of The Decline was a] nightmare! Recording this fuck was a total nightmare. Writing it was a total nightmare. I'm glad we did it but I wouldn't do it again. We went back to the studio 3 different times and added stuff and remixed and remastered 4 times. It ain't no rock opera like The Song Remains the Same or nothing. We got the idea from Subhumans, not Rush. Why an 18 minute song? Just to do something different. We've done enough short songs, time for a long one. Anyway, my advice, never try this song at home.

The first 155 copies were pressed on clear vinyl, a version which is no longer available.

The first 1 min and 20 seconds of a live version of The Decline is played as an encore after "Stickin' In My Eye" on They've Actually Gotten Worse Live! (2007) before being faded out. A DVD featuring a live performance of The Decline was released on September 12, 2012.

In 2016, an orchestral arrangement was released as part of the Mild in the Streets: Fat Music Unplugged compilation album, recorded by Baz and His Orchestra. Additionally, a video of the performance has been released. In 2019, NOFX and Baz's Orchestra recorded a live version while performing at the Red Rocks Amphitheatre in Morrison, Colorado, and it was subsequently published in 2020. The Decline was the final song performed by NOFX in the band's final ever performance held on October 6, 2024 in San Pedro, Los Angeles.

== Charts ==
Chart (1999-2000)	Peak position
US Billboard 200	200
US Independent Albums (Billboard)	32

== See also ==
- American decline
- Punk ideology
