= Another Day in Paradise (album) =

Studio album by Strung Out
- Released: May 15, 1994
- Genres: Melodic hardcore, Skate punk
- Length: 29:21
- Label: Fat Wreck Chords
- Producer: Fat Mike

Strung Out chronology
Another Day in Paradise (1994)	Suburban Teenage Wasteland Blues (1996)

Professional ratings
Review scores
Source	Rating
Punk Planet	Favorable

Another Day in Paradise is Strung Out's debut album with Fat Wreck Chords. The album was released on May 15, 1994. It was remastered and re-released on April 15, 2014, as part of the first volume of Strung Out's 20th anniversary box set, featuring the remastered tracks from The Skinny Years...Before We Got Fat as bonus tracks.

== Track listing ==
All lyrics by Jason Cruz except * by Jim Cherry
All leads by Rob Ramos

1. "Population Control" – 2:13 (Rob)
2. "Lost?" – 1:46 (Jim*)
3. "Drag Me Down" – 2:15 (Rob, Jake)
4. "In Harm's Way" – 2:32 (Jim*)
5. "Talking to Myself" – 1:44 (Jim, Jake)
6. "Broken" – 2:10 (Jim, Rob)
7. "Ashes" – 2:35 (Rob)
8. "Faulter" – 2:41 (Jim, Jake)
9. "Away" – 2:03 (Jim)
10. "Alone" – 2:19 (Jim, Rob)
11. "Unclean" – 2:35 (Rob)
12. "Mad Mad World" – 2:22 (Jim*)
13. "14 Days" – 2:06 (Rob)

== Personnel ==
- Jason Cruz - Lead vocals
- Jake Kiley - Guitar
- Rob Ramos - Guitar
- Jordan Burns - Drums
- Jim Cherry - Bass
- Donnell Cameron - Engineer
- Fat Mike - Producer
- Eddie Shreier - Mastering
