= Strung Out =

American punk rock band

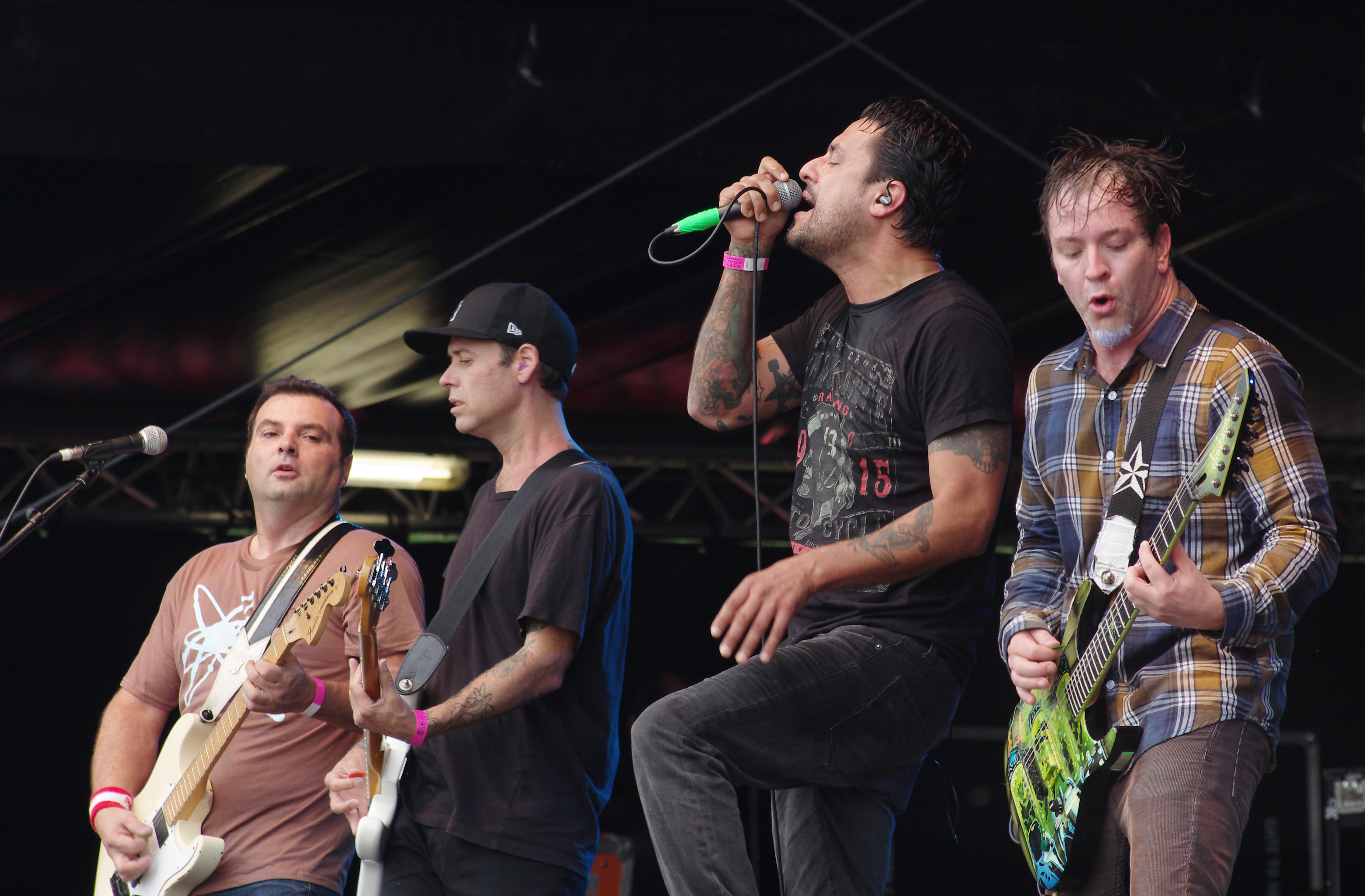
- Strung Out live in 2013. From left to right: Rob Ramos, Chris Aiken, Jason Cruz and Jake Kiley.

Background information
- Origin: Simi Valley, California, U.S.
- Genres: Melodic hardcore; skate punk
- Years active: 1991–present
- Label: Fat Wreck Chords
- Members: Jason Cruz; Rob Ramos; Chris Aiken; Daniel Blume; Derik Envy
- Past members: Jim Cherry; Adam Austin; Brad Morrison; Jordan Burns; RJ Shankle; Jake Kiley

Strung Out is an American melodic hardcore band from Simi Valley, California, formed in 1991. Their sound also includes elements of heavy metal. They have released 10 studio albums on Fat Wreck Chords as well as one live album, two B-sides collections, a best-of, a box set, and appeared on numerous compilations and skate/surf/dirt bike/offroading videos. They have played on the Warped Tour and continue to tour internationally. The band currently has an ongoing collaboration beer with Lucky Luke Brewing Company called "Astrolux Golden Ale". Their albums have charted on the Billboard 200.

== History ==
The band formed in 1991 in Simi Valley, California. The original lineup consisted of vocalist Jason Cruz, guitarist Rob Ramos, bassist Jim Cherry and drummer Adam Austin. After releasing a self-titled 7" record in 1993, they became one of the first bands to be signed to Fat Wreck Chords, the record label owned and operated by Fat Mike of the band NOFX. Austin left the band in 1992, and was replaced by Brad Morrison. Jake Kiley joined as second guitarist in 1993. Morrison left the band in 1993, and was replaced by Jordan Burns, formerly of fellow Simi Valley natives Ten Foot Pole. This lineup (Cruz, Ramos, Cherry, Kiley, and Burns) wrote and recorded the band's first album, Another Day in Paradise, which was tracked in late 1993, and released in May 1994. Suburban Teenage Wasteland Blues followed in 1996. In 1998 they released The Skinny Years...Before We Got Fat, a compilation album of their pre-Fat Wreck Chords material.

Bassist Jim Cherry was fired from the band due to conflict about his publishing and between the members in 1999 and went on to play in Pulley and Zero Down. Initially, Jim was replaced by Craig Riker (Jughead's Revenge), who played on the track Klawsterfobia (Short Music for Short People). This was a brief stint, ultimately being replaced by Chris Aiken, whose musical background had a strong impact on the 2000 eight-song EP, The Element of Sonic Defiance.

In 2002, the band released their fourth full-length album An American Paradox, their first release to appear in the Billboard 200. The initial production run contained a bonus song entitled "Don't Look Back". A video was filmed for the song "Cemetery" and was included on several punk rock video compilations. In 2003 they recorded and released a live album as part of the Fat Wreck Chords Live in a Dive series. Exile in Oblivion, was released on November 2, 2004, with a video filmed for the song "Analog." Strung Out released their sixth full-length album, Blackhawks Over Los Angeles on June 12, 2007.

In March 2009, Strung Out released a collection of rarities & B-sides entitled Prototypes and Painkillers. The album is the second such compilation from the band who previously compiled similar material on The Skinny Years: Before We Got Fat in 1998.

On September 29, 2009, Strung Out released their 7th studio album titled Agents of the Underground.

On July 19, 2011, they released the compilation album Top Contenders: The Best of Strung Out. In contains remastered versions of 23 songs, and 3 new songs; "City Lights", "Saturday Night", and "Here We Are".

On August 2, 2012, drummer Jordan Burns revealed to Punknews.org that Strung Out planned to release a new album. Transmission.Alpha.Delta was announced as the title of the album, initially scheduled to be released in the summer of 2014. The album was delayed and released on March 24, 2015.

On February 19, 2018, the band announced on their Facebook page that Jordan Burns is no longer the drummer. Soon after it was revealed that RJ Shankle of the band Runaway Kids was selected to be the new drummer of Strung Out. Daniel Blume was tapped to fill in for RJ on select dates throughout 2018, while RJ fulfilled his prior obligations with Runaway Kids.

On April 18, 2018, the band released an eight-song EP called Black Out the Sky, which was inspired by Alice in Chains' 1994 acoustic EP Jar of Flies.

On January 7, 2019, both Strung Out and Jason Cruz posted to their respective social media accounts that the band was in the studio recording a new album. Cruz later confirmed that the album was not an acoustic recording like Black Out The Sky but rather a full punk rock album. In another series of posts by Jason Cruz revealed Agents of the Underground producer Cameron Webb would be returning to produce the upcoming album.

On May 15, 2019, Jason Cruz announced the name of the upcoming Strung Out album, Songs of Armor and Devotion on Episode 15 of the Dying Scene Podcast. The album was released August 9, 2019. It embodied a return to speed, upping the tempo from the previous two albums. Regarded as one of, if not the most, technically ambitious Strung Out records to date.

In January 2023, the band officially revealed that they were in the studio working on a new album with new drummer Daniel Blume, following RJ Shankle's departure in late 2022. It was revealed on April 21, 2023, via the band's social media that the title of the album would be Dead Rebellion.

In March 2024, the band went out on tour in support of Dead Rebellion.

Guitar player Jake Kiley departed with the band in 2024 but was credited with significant songwriting contributions on Dead Rebellion.

== Band members ==
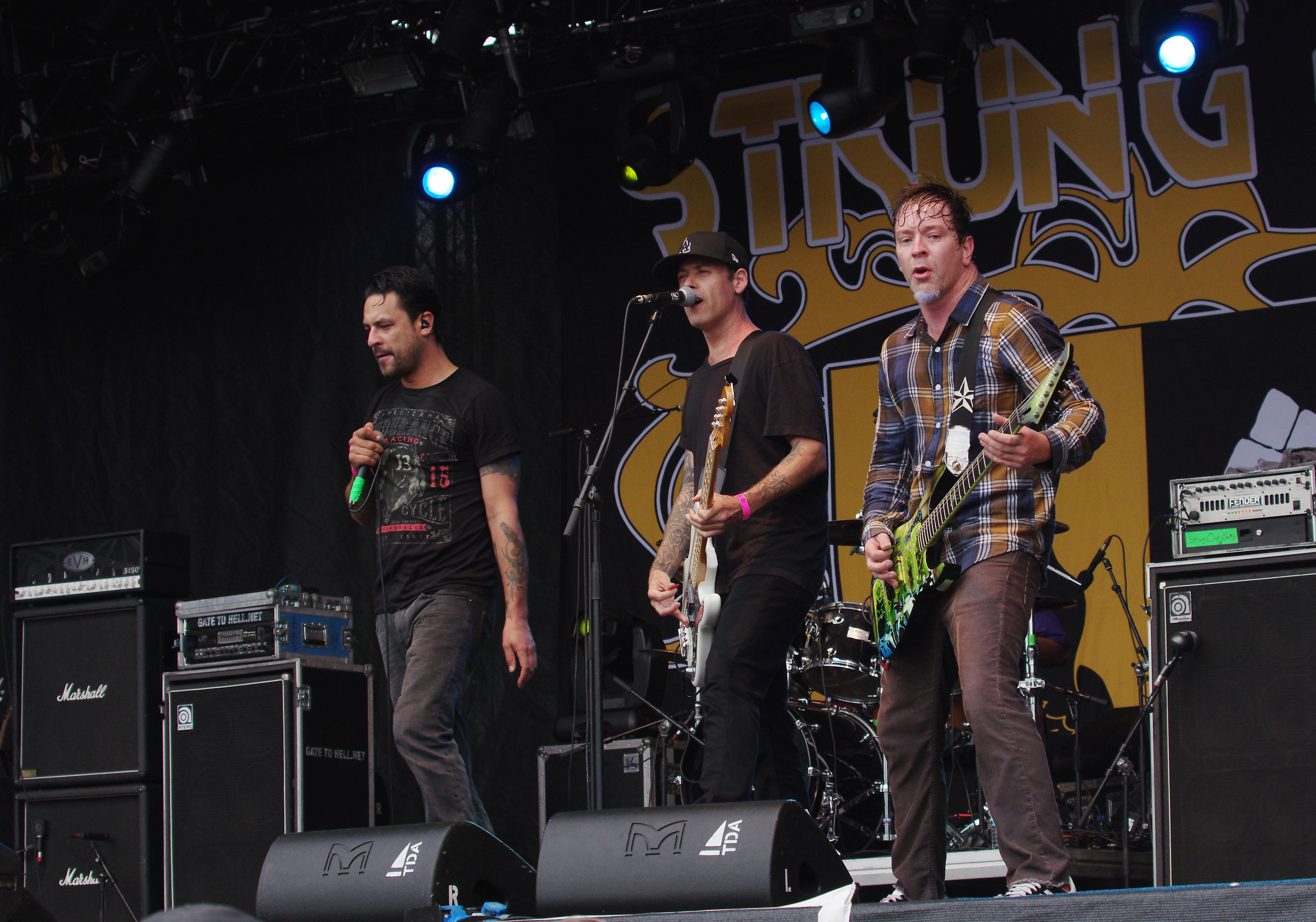
Strung Out performing in 2013

Current members

- Jason Cruz – lead vocals (1991–present)
- Rob Ramos – guitar, backing vocals (1991–present)
- Chris Aiken – guitar (2024-present); bass (1999–2024); backing vocals (1999–present)
- Daniel Blume – drums (2022–present)
- Derik Envy – bass, backing vocals (2024–present)

Former members

- Jim Cherry – bass, backing vocals (1991–1999; died 2002)
- Adam Austin – drums (1991–1992)
- Brad Morrison – drums (1992–1993)
- Jordan Burns – drums (1993–2018)
- RJ Shankle – drums (2018–2022)
- Jake Kiley – guitar (1993–2024)

== Discography ==
=== Studio albums ===
- Another Day in Paradise (1994)
- Suburban Teenage Wasteland Blues (1996)
- Twisted by Design (1998)
- An American Paradox (2002)
- Exile in Oblivion (2004)
- Blackhawks Over Los Angeles (2007)
- Agents of the Underground (2009)
- Transmission.Alpha.Delta (2015)
- Songs of Armor and Devotion (2019)
- Dead Rebellion (2024)

=== Compilation albums ===
- The Skinny Years...Before We Got Fat (1998)
- Prototypes and Painkillers (2009)
- Top Contenders: The Best of Strung Out (2011)

=== Live albums ===
- Live in a Dive (2003)

=== EPs ===
- Seven Inch (1993)
- Crossroads & Illusions (1998)
- The Element of Sonic Defiance (2000)
- Black Out the Sky (2018)

=== Music videos and singles ===
- "Bring Out Your Dead" from Suburban Teenage Wasteland Blues (1996)
- "Mind of My Own" from Twisted by Design (1998)
- "Cemetery" from An American Paradox (2002)
- "Analog" from Exile in Oblivion (2004)
- "Calling" from Blackhawks Over Los Angeles (2007)
- "Carcrashradio" from Agents of the Underground (2009)
- "City Lights" from Top Condenders: The Best of Strung Out (2011)
- "Modern Drugs" from Transmission.Alpha.Delta (2015)
- "Town of Corazon" from Black Out the Sky (2018)
- "Requiem" from Black Out the Sky (2018)
- "Under the Western Sky" from Songs of Armor and Devotion (2019)
- "New Gods" from Dead Rebellion (2024)
- "Cages" from Dead Rebellion (2024)
