= Twisted by Design =

Studio album by Strung Out
- Released: April 28, 1998
- Genre: Hardcore punk
- Length: 36:31
- Label: Fat Wreck Chords
- Producer: Ulrich Wild

Strung Out chronology
| Suburban Teenage Wasteland Blues (1996) | Twisted by Design (1998) | An American Paradox (2002) |

Twisted by Design is Strung Out's third album with Fat Wreck Chords. The CD was released on April 28, 1998, and the LP on 5/5/98. The album was the last with former bassist Jim Cherry, who left the group one year later, replaced by current bassist Chris Aiken, and died of a heart problem in 2002. It was re-mixed, re-mastered and re-released on April 15, 2014 as part of the first volume of Strung Out's 20th anniversary box set. The album received positive reviews by critics and fans alike.

== Track listing ==
All lyrics by Jason Cruz except * by Jim Cherry
All leads by Rob Ramos except "Asking For The World" by Jake Kiley

1. "Too Close to See" – 3:01 (Rob)
2. "Exhumation of Virginia Madison" – 2:20 (Jake, Rob)
3. "Deville" – 2:12 (Rob)
4. "Mind of My Own" – 2:33 (Jim*)
5. "Reason to Believe" – 2:15 (Jim*, Jake, Rob)
6. "Crossroads" – 2:54 (Jake, Jim)
7. "Paperwalls" – 3:23 (Jake, Rob)
8. "Ice Burn" – 2:09 (Jake, Rob)
9. "Ultimate Devotion" – 2:06 (Jim*)
10. "King Alvarez" – 2:22 (Rob)
11. "Asking For The World" – 2:25 (Jim)
12. "Tattoo" – 2:23 (Rob*)
13. "Just Like Me" – 2:04 (Jim*)
14. "Matchbook" – 4:24 (Rob)

== Personnel ==
- Jason Cruz – Lead vocals
- Jake Kiley – Guitar
- Rob Ramos – Guitar
- Jordan Burns – Drums
- Jim Cherry – Bass
- Ulrich Wild – Producer, Engineer
- Jeff Robinson – Assistant engineer
- Jodi Wille – Photography
- Tom Baker – Mastering
- Famous Nick – Design, Layout design
