= Exile in Oblivion =

Studio album by Strung Out
- Released: November 2, 2004
- Recorded: 2004
- Studio: Westbeach Recorders, Hollywood, California
- Genre: Melodic hardcore, heavy metal
- Length: 44:30
- Label: Fat Wreck Chords
- Producer: Matt Hyde

Strung Out chronology
| An American Paradox (2002) | Exile in Oblivion (2004) | Blackhawks Over Los Angeles (2007) |

Exile in Oblivion is the fifth studio album by American punk band Strung Out, released by Fat Wreck Chords in 2004. The song "Analog" was used as part of the soundtrack to the video game MX vs. ATV Unleashed.

== Release ==
On July 29, 2004, Strung Out announced that their next album would be titled Exile in Oblivion. They played a few Californian shows, before embarking on a European tour, with some shows featuring the Bouncing Souls. On August 11, 2004, Exile in Oblivion was announced for release in three months' time. On September 16, 2004, "Lucifer Motorcade" was posted online. That same month, the band appeared at The Supercade Music Fest. On October 11, 2004, "Analog" was posted online. Exile in Oblivion was released on November 2, 2004, through Fat Wreck Chords; the band promoted it with a month-long US tour with Saosin, Love Is Red and Last of the Famous. They went on a West Coast tour with A Wilhelm Scream, Only Crime and Haste the Day in December 2004.

Strung Out opened 2005 touring the US southern states with Evergreen Terrace and the Explosion. On February 9, 2005, the music video for "Analog" was posted online. They toured New Zealand and Australia in March and April 2005 with Useless ID, before trekking across Europe in May 2005 as part of the Deconstruction Tour. Strung Out appeared on the 2005 Warped Tour between June and August 2005, which marked their first outing since 1998. They went on a tour of North America in September and October 2005, with Bane, Comeback Kid and the Reason. They embarked on a predominantly East Coast tour for the remainder of October, with Stretch Arm Strong and Phathom; A Wilhelm Scream appeared on a few of shows. In May and June 2006, the band went on a US West Tour with Phathom, prior to a trek to Australia. They then went on a three-week tour of South America in July and August 2006.

The album was played live in its entirety during their 35th anniversary tour in Europe in 2025 while it was being remastered. A reworked song from the sessions titled “Glass Houses” was released on July 9, 2025. The album remaster was released on October 17, 2025.

== Reception ==
Professional ratings
Review scores
| Source | Rating |
|---|---|
| AllMusic | 3.5/5 stars |
| laut.de | 3/5 stars |
| Ox-Fanzine | 2/10 |
| Punknews.org | 3/5 stars |

Reception to the album was positive, with reviews from both AbsolutePunk and AllMusic giving the album positive scores. Johnny Loftus of AllMusic stated, "Exile is by no means just the next California punk-pop record."

== Track listing ==
1. "Analog" – 2:55
2. "Blueprint of the Fall" – 3:05
3. "Katatonia" – 2:46
4. "Her Name in Blood" – 3:20
5. "Angeldust" – 3:39
6. "Lucifermotorcade" – 2:43
7. "Vampires" – 2:46
8. "No Voice of Mine" – 2:28
9. "Anna Lee" – 3:12
10. "Never Speak Again" – 4:01
11. "Skeletondanse" – 2:43
12. "Scarlet" – 3:19
13. "Swan Dive" – 3:30
14. "The Misanthropic Principle" – 4:06
15. "Glass Houses" – 3:17 (20th Anniversary Release Only)

== Credits ==
- Jason Cruz – vocals
- Jake Kiley – guitar
- Rob Ramos – guitar
- Chris Aiken – bass
- Jordan Burns – drums
