= With a Lifetime to Pay =

Studio album by Zero Down
- Released: February 20, 2001
- Genre: Punk rock
- Length: 31:34
- Label: Fat Wreck Chords
- Producer: Ryan Greene

With a Lifetime to Pay is the first and only album from Californian punk rock band Zero Down. It was released in February, 2001 on Fat Wreck Chords.

== Track listing ==
All songs written by Zero Down.

1. "The Way It Is" – 2:48
2. "No Apologies" – 2:27
3. "Bite the Hand That Feeds" – 2:21
4. "Empty Promised Land" – 2:53
5. "Going Nowhere" – 2:55
6. "It Ain't Over Yet" – 2:07
7. "Everybodies Whore" – 2:20
8. "Suck Seed" – 1:44
9. "Temptation" – 2:47
10. "Never Gonna Be the Same" – 2:11
11. "Self Medication" – 3:18
12. "The Best" – 1:05
13. "A Million More" – 2:38
14. "Down This Road" (Bonus track, digital only) – 2:20

== Personnel ==
- Jim Cherry – bass, vocals
- John McCree – guitar
- Milo Todesco – drums
- Produced by Ryan Greene
- Engineered by Ryan Greene and Adam Krammer
