= Zero Down =

American punk rock band

Background information
- Origin: California
- Genres: Punk
- Years active: 2000–2002
- Label: Fat Wreck Chords
- Members: Jim Cherry; Milo Todesco; John McCree; Shawn Dewey (2001-2002)
- Past members: Chris Dalley
- Website: zerodownmusic.com

Zero Down was an American punk rock trio formed by former Strung Out bassist Jim Cherry, former Down by Law drummer Milo Todesco and former War Called Peace guitarist John McCree. Frontman Cherry (who was also guitarist and songwriter for Epitaph Records band Pulley) enlisted the support of Fat Wreck Chords owner Fat Mike, who released the band's first (and only) album, With a Lifetime to Pay in 2001. The music was a throwback to mid-1990s melodic skate punk, and is still well received to this day. The band added a fourth member in August 2001, ex-Lagwagon guitarist Shawn Dewey.

== Formation ==
Zero Down started with Jim and a "Drummer Kid" as Jim says in an interview. While looking for a guitarist, Jim found guitarist John McCree through a mutual friend. They started jamming together, while the old drummer decided to leave. After attempts to find a new drummer, they ended up putting an ad in their local newspaper stating "punk band looking for a good drummer". Afterwards, Milo answered, and the three started jamming together. And after looking for a vocalist, Jim's wife Wendy Cherry, convinced him to sing himself, and keep the band as three-piece.

== Recording & Touring ==
Initially, the band was called Double Down when they started demoing for their album "With A Lifetime To Pay". They would later record with producer Ryan Greene and engineer Adam Krammer. During 2001, They would tour around the area, including doing shows for Sno Jam 7, along with doing shows with Diesel Boy and No Use for a Name. They were planning on recording another album sometime in mid-to-late 2001, though the album never came into fruition.

== Jim's Death ==
Zero Down came to a premature demise on July 7, 2002, with the death of Jim Cherry from a lifelong heart condition. Early reports suggested that Cherry died from an accidental prescription drug overdose; Fat Wreck Chords released the following statement:

Jim lived his life as an honest and open person and we feel that it's important to share the facts with the punk rock community. Although Jim had been clean in recent months, he battled addiction with prescription drugs for a couple of years. It would seem that his addiction got the best of him, as he died from an accidental overdose of Soma (a muscle relaxer) this past weekend. Again, we send our thoughts out to Jim's family and loved ones.

However, in December 2002 the label released a further statement concerning Cherry's death:

We have the final news regarding the tragic death of Jim Cherry this past summer. Although it was earlier reported that Jim's passing came as a result of substance abuse, the autopsy revealed that Jim's system was clean at the time of his death. Jim had a life-long heart condition which ultimately resulted in his death on July 7th. His family informs us that he suffered from hypertension and arrhythmia; and it was major blockage of an artery that eventually took his life while he was asleep. Jim was a big part of the Fat family as well as a member of Strung Out, Zero Down, and Pulley, and he will always be remembered for his passion and songwriting. He is greatly missed...

== Discography ==
=== Album ===
- With a Lifetime to Pay (2001), Fat Wreck Chords

=== Compilation contribution ===
- Fat Music Vol. V: Live Fat, Die Young (2001, Fat Wreck Chords with the song Down This Road)
- Wrecktrospective (2009, Fat Wreck Chords with a demo version of No Apologies, disc two)
