= Jim Cherry =

American musician (1971–2002)

- Also known as: Jim Cherry
- Born: James Paul Cherry III; August 2, 1971; Simi Valley, California
- Died: July 7, 2002 (aged 30)
- Genres: Punk rock; melodic hardcore; skate punk
- Occupation: Musician
- Instruments: Bass, guitar, vocals
- Years active: 1989-2002
- Labels: Fat Wreck Chords, Epitaph

Jim Cherry (August 2, 1971 – July 7, 2002) was an American musician, most famous for being the bassist in the punk rock band Strung Out. His other musical credits include the guitar player in the band Pulley, and bassist/vocalist in the band Zero Down.

== Personal life ==
Cherry was born James Paul Cherry III in Simi Valley, California, United States. He was one of the five original members and the original bassist of the band Strung Out. He was also part of the initial lineup of the band Pulley, playing guitar. After releasing three albums with Strung Out, Cherry left the band in 1999; he was against the idea of Strung Out moving away from punk rock into metal territory, which Jake Kiley and other members cited to be a way to innovate on their music.

Shortly after, he formed the punk rock band Zero Down, acting as lead vocals and bassist. After releasing one album, With a Lifetime to Pay, in 2001, Zero Down met its demise upon Cherry's death on July 7, 2002. Although Cherry's death was originally thought to have been caused by a drug overdose, it was later revealed Cherry had been clean, and had died from a congenital heart condition.

After his death, many bands in the punk rock community responded to Cherry's death through music. In the liner notes of their album Exile in Oblivion, Strung Out dedicates the song "Swan Dive" to Cherry. Pulley dedicated the album Matters to Cherry, as well as the song "Thanks". He is also mentioned in the NOFX song "Doornails" from their 2006 album, Wolves in Wolves' Clothing.
