= Blackhawks Over Los Angeles =

Studio album by Strung Out
- Released: June 12, 2007
- Genre: Melodic hardcore, skate punk
- Length: 48:49
- Label: Fat Wreck Chords
- Producer: Matt Hyde

Strung Out chronology
Exile in Oblivion (2004)	Blackhawks Over Los Angeles (2007)	Agents of the Underground (2009)

Professional ratings
Review scores
Source	Rating
AbsolutePunk	79%
AllMusic	4/5 stars
Punknews.org	4/5 stars

Blackhawks Over Los Angeles is the sixth studio album by American punk band Strung Out, released by Fat Wreck Chords on June 12, 2007.

== Background ==
In October 2006, Strung Out spent some time at Pulley's practice space, where they wrote some new material. On November 26, 2006, the band made a demo of "Downtown" available for streaming.

== Release ==
In April 2007, Strung Out played two shows in California, prior to an appearance at the Groezrock festival in Europe. On May 8, 2007, "Calling" was posted on the band's Myspace profile, followed by "Party in the Hills" the following month. The album was planned for release in spring 2007; it was made available for streaming via their Myspace on June 8, 2007, before being released four days later. On June 14, 2007, the music video for "Calling" was posted online. The album was promoted with a release show in Simi Valley, California, and a tour of Europe through to the end of July 2007. In August, the band went on a North American tour with support from A Wilhelm Scream and I Am Ghost. In September and October 2007, they embarked on a second leg, this time with Evergreen Terrace and I Am Ghost. They closed out the year touring with Bad Religion on their headlining trek of Australia. In April 2008, the band embarked on a club tour of Europe alongside Ignite, Terror, Death Before Dishonor, and Burnthe8track. Alongside this, the band played their own European shows through to May 2008. They returned to the US where they supported Pennywise on their headlining tour; in between some of these dates, they played their own headlining shows with a variety of other bands. In October 2008, preceded by two shows, the band performed at the LiskFest festival in California, and then embarked on a tour of the UK.

The first 5000 copies of the album include a bonus song titled "More Than Words". Another bonus song is included with the iTunes release, titled "Novella".

== Track listing ==
All tracks are written by Strung Out

Blackhawks Over Los Angeles track listing
No.	Title	Length
1.	"Calling"	4:19
2.	"Blackhawks Over Los Angeles"	3:03
3.	"Party in the Hills"	3:54
4.	"All the Nations"	3:03
5.	"A War Called Home"	3:20
6.	"Letter Home"	3:47
7.	"Orchid"	3:02
8.	"Dirty Little Secret"	3:20
9.	"Downtown"	4:08
10.	"The King Has Left the Building"	3:34
11.	"Mission Statement"	3:15
12.	"Diver"	3:36
13.	"More Than Words" (limited edition bonus track)	3:29
14.	"Novella" (iTunes bonus track)	2:59

== Charts ==
Chart performance for Blackhawks Over Los Angeles
Chart (2007)	Peak position
Australian Albums (ARIA)	84
US Billboard Top Heatseekers	5
US Billboard Top Independent Albums	33
