= An American Paradox =

Studio album by Strung Out
- Released: April 23, 2002
- Recorded: 2001
- Studios: Westbeach Recorders, Hollywood, California
- Genre: Melodic hardcore
- Length: 43:50
- Label: Fat Wreck Chords
- Producer: Strung Out

Strung Out chronology
The Element of Sonic Defiance (2000)	An American Paradox (2002)	Exile in Oblivion (2004)

Singles from An American Paradox
- 1. "Cemetery" Released: 2002

Professional ratings
Review scores
Source	Rating
AllMusic	4/5 stars
Drowned in Sound	7/10 stars

An American Paradox is the fourth album by American punk band Strung Out, released in 2002 by Fat Wreck Chords. The album was the band's first to debut on the Billboard 200. This is their first album with current bassist, Chris Aiken.

== Background and production ==
In August 2000, the band were shopping around different labels for their next album. Around this time, the band were writing a lot of material while on tour, with the aim of releasing an album in early 2001, which was reportedly titled American Paradox. Shortly afterwards, they toured the US and Canada with No Motiv in September 2000, and the US with Papa Roach in November 2000.

An American Paradox was recorded at Westbeach Recorders in Hollywood, California, with the band acting as producers. Donnell Cameron handled recording, with assistance from Chris Gresham and Mike Trujillo. Cameron mixed the album at Westbeach, before it was mastered by Eddie Schreyer at Oasis Mastering in Studio City, California.

== Release ==
In May 2001, it was reported that An American Paradox would be released through Fat Wreck. "Cult of the Subterranean" was made available for download on October 10, 2001. On March 24, 2002, "Alien Amplifier" was posted online. An American Paradox was released on April 23, 2002, and promoted with a tour of the same name the following month; they were accompanied by the Line, Rufio, and Glasseater. On May 4, 2002, the music video for "Cemetery" was posted online. They embarked on a US tour with Poison the Well, Rise Against, and Rufio in June 2002. In August, the band played a handful of US shows, before touring across Canada; the Canadian shows were support by Snapcase, Rise Against, and the Line. The band played four shows at the Chain Reaction in Anaheim, California, all of which were recorded and released as part of the Live in a Dive series. In July 2003, the band went on a tour of Australia and New Zealand. They returned to the US, where they toured in August and September with Eighteen Visions, A Static Lullaby, and the Getaway. In November, the band toured across Japan as part of the Fat Tour, with Wizo and Nerf Herder.

== Track listing ==
Track listing per booklet.

1. "Velvet Alley" – 3:02
2. "Kill Your Scene" – 2:09
3. "Alien Amplifier" – 2:36
4. "Cult of the Subterranean" – 2:59
5. "Lubricating the Revolution" – 1:49
6. "The Kids"– 3:01
7. "Unkoil" – 4:54
8. "Contender" – 2:13
9. "Satellite" – 3:56
10. "An American Paradox" – 2:36
11. "Dig" – 2:54
12. "Razor Sex" – 2:56
13. "Cemetery" – 6:05
14. "Don't Look Back" (bonus track only found on first pressing of CD and all Australian copies) – 2:40

== Personnel ==
Personnel per booklet.

Strung Out

- Jason Cruz – lead vocals
- Jordan Burns – drums
- Jake Kiley – guitar
- Rob Ramos – guitar
- Chris Aiken – bass

Additional musicians

- Chet Tek One – sound fx

Production

- Donnell Cameron – tracking, mixing
- Chris Gresham – assistant
- Mike Trujillo – assistant
- Strung Out – producer
- Eddy Schreyer – mastering

Design

- Luis Ramos – photography
- Anik Jean – cover model
- Jason Cruz – art direction
- Nick Rubenstein – Art direction

== Charts ==
Chart performance for An American Paradox
Chart (2002)	Peak position
Australian Albums (ARIA)	52
US Billboard 200	185
