= Agents of the Underground =

Studio album by Strung Out
- Released: September 29, 2009
- Genres: Skate punk; punk metal; metalcore
- Length: 36:29
- Label: Fat Wreck Chords
- Producer: Cameron Webb

Strung Out chronology
Blackhawks Over Los Angeles (2007)	Agents of the Underground (2009)	Transmission.Alpha.Delta (2015)

Professional ratings
Review scores
Source	Rating
Alter the Press	4.5/5 stars
Scene Point Blank	(8.7/10)

Agents of the Underground is the 7th studio album from American punk band, Strung Out. This album celebrates the band's 20th anniversary and was released on September 29, 2009, through Fat Wreck Chords. This was notably their second album to chart on Billboard, reaching #196.

== Release ==
On August 12, 2009, Agents of the Underground was announced for release the following month. Alongside this, the album's track listing and artwork were posted online. On August 28, 2009, "Black Crosses" was posted online. Agents of the Underground was made available for streaming through the band's Myspace profile on September 21, 2009, ahead of its release on September 29, 2009. In October 2009, the band played a handful of Southern US shows with Lower Class Brats, Nations Afaire, and the Flatliners. On December 8, 2009, a music video was released for "Carcrashradio." In January 2010, the band went on a brief West Coast tour with Calabrese and Pulley. Following this, they went on a US tour with Dropkick Murphys and Larry and His Flask. In June 2010, the band went on an Australian tour with the Loved Ones. They went on a short North American tour with support from Rufio, We Are the Union and Mute.

== Track listing ==
1. "Black Crosses" - 3:40
2. "Carcrashradio" - 2:46
3. "The Fever and the Sound" - 3:40
4. "Heart Attack" - 3:12
5. "Vanity" - 3:36
6. "Ghetto Heater" - 3:28
7. "Agents of the Underground" - 3:30
8. "Nation of Thieves" - 3:06
9. "Jack Knife" - 2:29
10. "Dead Spaces" - 3:40
11. "Andy Warhol" - 3:22

== Charts ==
Chart (2009)	Peak position
US Billboard 200	196
