= Dave Hause =

American singer-songwriter (born 1978)

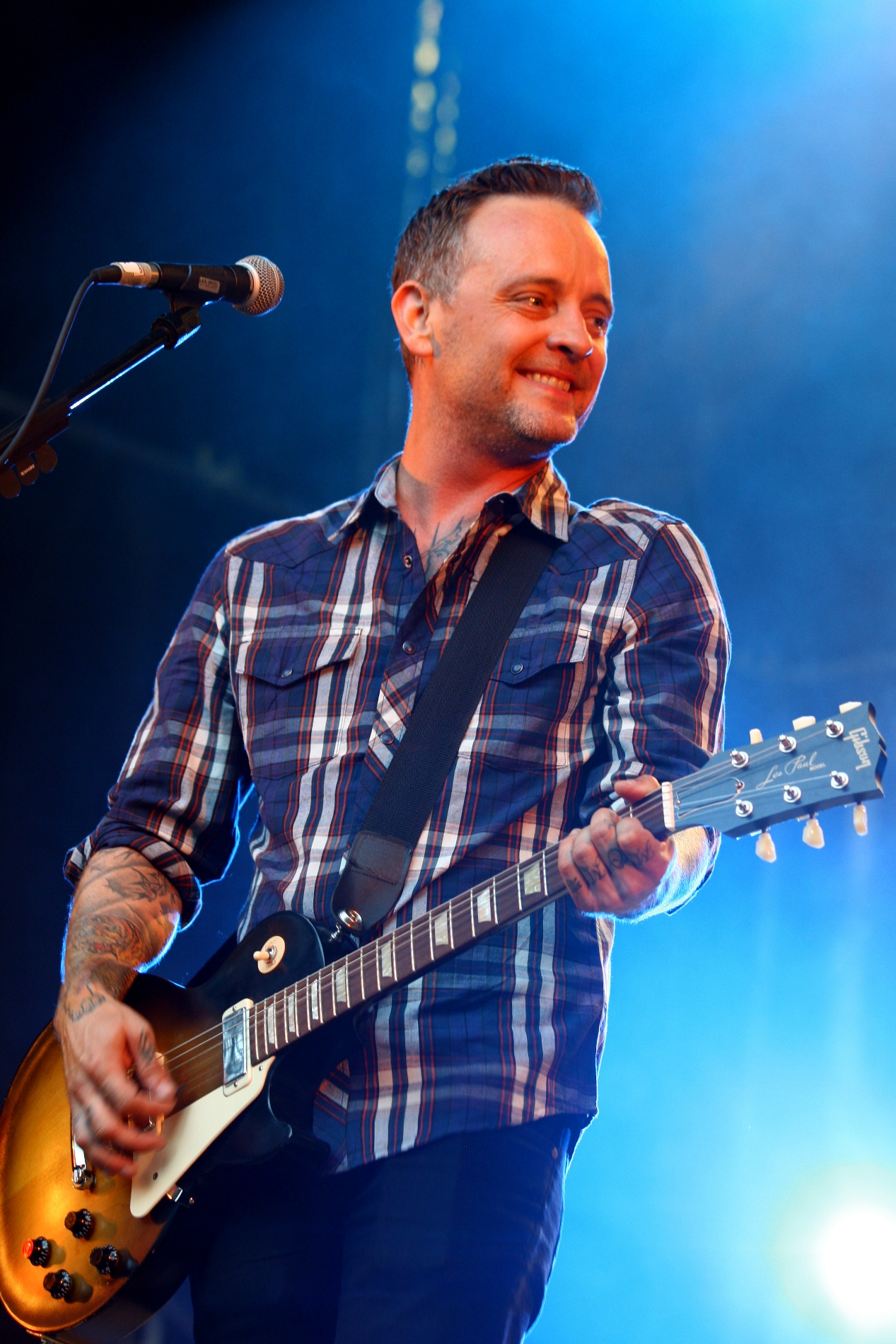

Background information
- Born: March 12, 1978 (age 47)
- Origin: Philadelphia, Pennsylvania, U.S.
- Genres: Punk rock; alternative rock; folk rock; Americana; heartland rock
- Occupations: Musician; songwriter
- Instruments: Vocals; guitar; piano
- Years active: 1995–present
- Labels: Jade Tree Records; Fat Wreck Chords; Paper + Plastick; Xtra Mile Recordings; Rise Records; Bridge 9
- Member of: Dave Hause and The Mermaid
- Formerly of: Step Ahead; The Curse; Paint It Black; The Loved Ones; The Falcon; The All Brights
- Website: www.davehause.com

Dave Hause (born March 12, 1978) is an American singer-songwriter. He currently performs both solo and with his band The Mermaid. His music draws from heartland rock, folk rock and punk rock. He has also played in multiple Philadelphia-area punk and hardcore bands, including The Loved Ones and The Falcon.

== Music and career ==
=== 1995 to 2003: Early years and The Curse ===
In the mid-90s, Hause played guitar in a Philadelphia-based hardcore/punk band called Step Ahead, which released one album. After they broke up, Hause and Brendan Hill, the drummer from Step Ahead, formed The Curse. The Curse, which featured Hause on guitar and sharing vocals, released two songs on the four-way split album The Philadelphia Sound and released a six-track EP on Hell Bent Records before playing their last show on April 12, 2003, opening for Kid Dynamite. While with The Curse, he also played guitar and sang back-up vocals for Paint It Black.

=== 2004 to 2008: The Loved Ones ===
In April 2004, he formed The Loved Ones with former Kid Dynamite member Michael "Spider" Cotterman and former Trial By Fire drummer Mike Sneeringer. Shortly after, in July 2004, he quit Paint It Black to focus on The Loved Ones.

=== 2009 to 2012: Early solo career & Resolutions ===
In 2009, Hause performed solo material alongside Chuck Ragan, Tim Barry, and Jim Ward as part of Ragan's Revival Tour, a collaborative folk concert tour.

Hause subsequently released his first solo music, a 7-inch single, in May 2010. He released a CD single in December, 2010, followed by the January 24 release of his debut, full-length solo album, Resolutions via Paper + Plastick. On April 12, 2011, a video was released for the song "Time Will Tell”. The video pays homage to the 1967 Martin Scorsese short film The Big Shave. He was featured in The Gaslight Anthem's music video for their single "Bring It On" from their album American Slang. A video for the song "C'mon Kid" was released on Sept 1, 2011 via Rocksound.

In September, 2011, Xtra Mile Recordings licensed Resolutions and released the record in the UK and Europe and over the next two months, Hause performed across Europe with The Revival Tour, alongside Chuck Ragan, Dan Andriano of Alkaline Trio, and Brian Fallon of The Gaslight Anthem.

In 2012, Hause released a series of five 7-inch singles, each on a different label. Each 7-inch features two newly recorded versions of songs from Resolutions and two covers of songs from the catalog of the label of releasing that 7-inch. The first release came on Record Store Day and the last one in October, and the labels that released them were, in order, Side One Dummy Records, Jade Tree Records, Bridge Nine Records, Chunksaah Records and Sabot Productions.

=== 2013 to 2016: Second album Devour ===
In early 2013, Hause was signed to Rise Records, who re-released his solo album Resolutions in March. It was later announced that Rise would release his second solo album Devour, in October 2013.

In December 2014 Dave Hause released his song "Seasons Greetings From Ferguson“ as a lyric video. The song deals with police violence against African Americans and was written under the impact of the protests that followed the shooting of Michael Brown.

=== 2017 to 2018: Bury Me in Philly and The Mermaid ===
Hause's third solo album Bury Me In Philly was released on February 3, 2017. It was recorded and produced in Philadelphia by Eric Bazilian (The Hooters) and William Wittman. A few days before the official release, the album was streamed in full at several websites. Described as a unification of punk and Americana by Rolling Stone, the record embraced a more optimistic outlook, influenced by falling in love again, moving from Philadelphia to California and the new musical collaboration between Dave and his brother Tim Hause.

Until then, Dave Hause had performed his solo material solo or as a duo but for the Bury Me In Philly tour, he put together a band, The Mermaid, composed of Dave on vocals and guitar, Dave´s brother Tim Hause on lead guitar, Miles Bentley (Jay Bentley´s son) on bass, Kevin Conroy on drums and Kayleigh Goldsworthy on keyboard. They toured American and Europe in this configuration; their first show in Cologne on March 1, 2017, was recorded for the German TV show Rockpalast (video).

In 2018, Hause continued touring across North America and Europe. He supported Brian Fallon and The Gaslight Anthem on their respective European tours with brother Tim.

=== 2019: Kick ===
In 2019, Hause released his fourth solo record, Kick. He toured the record with The Mermaid, again performing across North America and Europe.

=== 2021: Blood Harmony ===
Following from the success of previous album, Kick, Hause once again entered the studio to record his fifth studio album, Blood Harmony, which released on 22 October 2021. This was the first album released on Hause's own record label, Blood Harmony Records, co-owned by his brother and collaborator, Tim Hause. Prior to the release of the album Sandy Sheets, Surfboard, Hanalei, Gary and Carry The Lantern were released as singles, and released a Making of documentary in support of the album. In January 2022, Hause is to embark on a 14 day tour of mainland Europe, followed by six dates in the UK and a 15 date tour in the US and Canada in support of the album.

== Inspiration and influences ==
Hause has cited Bruce Springsteen, Tom Petty, The Clash, Bob Dylan, The Beatles, The Hooters, Bryan Adams, Aerosmith, Iron Maiden, Metallica, The Misfits, Sick Of It All, Steve Earle, Tori Amos, The Bouncing Souls, Avail, Patty Griffin, Brandi Carlile, Hot Water Music, Social Distortion, the Ramones and Pearl Jam as influences.

== Discography ==
=== Solo ===
==== Studio albums ====
- Resolutions (Paper + Plastick, 2011)
- Devour (Rise Records, 2013)
- Bury Me in Philly (Rise Records, 2017)
- Kick (Rise Records, 2019)
- Blood Harmony (Blood Harmony Records, 2021)
- Drive It Like It’s Stolen (Blood Harmony Records, 2023)
- Versus (Blood Harmony Records, 2024)
- Nurses (Blood Harmony Records, 2025)
- ...and the Mermaid (Blood Harmony Records, 2025)

==== EPs ====
- "Melanin" 7-inch (Bantic Media, 2010)
- "Resolutions" EP (Paper + Plastick, 2010)
- "Resolutions" 7-inch (Side One Dummy Records, 2012)
- "Heavy Heart" 7-inch (Jade Tree Records, 2012)
- "Pray for Tucson" 7-inch (Bridge Nine Records, 2012)
- "Time Will Tell" 7-inch (Chunksaah Records, 2012)
- "C’mon Kid" 7-inch (Sabot Productions, 2012)
- "C'mon Kid" 7-inch (Xtramile Recordings, 2013)
- "Home Alone" (Rise Records, 2015)
- "September Haze" (End Hits Records, 2019)
- "Patty" (2020)
- "Paddy" (2020)

==== Videography ====
- "Time Will Tell" (2011)
- "C'mon Kid" (2011)
- "C'mon Kid" (PIV session - 2011)
- "Seasons Greetings From Ferguson" (2014)
- "The Flinch" (2017)
- “Bury Me In Philly” (2018)

=== with Step Ahead ===
- There's Always Hope! (Initforit Records, 1998)

=== with The Curse ===
- The Philadelphia Sound split (Chunksaah Records, 2002)
- The Curse EP (Hell Bent Records, 2003)

=== with Paint It Black ===
- Demo (Self released, 2002)
- CVA (Jade Tree Records, 2003)

=== with The Loved Ones ===
- Demo (self-released, 2004)
- Demo 2 (self-released, ???)
- The Loved Ones EP (Jade Tree Records, 2005)
- Keep Your Heart (Fat Wreck Chords, 2006)
- Build & Burn (Fat Wreck Chords, 2008)
- Distractions (Fat Wreck Chords, 2009)

=== with The All Brights ===
- ...Are Wild For The Night (Red Scare Industries, 2015)
- The White Album EP (Red Scare Industries, 2018)

=== with The Falcon ===
- Gather Up the Chaps (Red Scare Industries, 2016)
