= William Furness =

William Furness may refer to:

- William Henry Furness (1802–1896), American clergyman, theologian, and reformer
- William Henry Furness Jr. (1827–1867), American portrait painter
- William Henry Furness III (1866–1920), American physician, ethnographer and author
- William Anthony Furness, 2nd Viscount Furness (1929–1995), British peer
