= Annis Lee Wister =

American translator (1830–1908)

- Born: Annis Lee Furness; October 9, 1830; Philadelphia, Pennsylvania, U.S.
- Died: November 15, 1908 (aged 78); Wallingford, Pennsylvania, U.S.
- Known for: Translated 42 books of German popular novels into English
- Spouse: Caspar Wister
- Parents: William Henry Furness; Annis P. Jenks
- Relatives: Frank Furness (brother); Horace Howard Furness (brother); William Henry Furness Jr. (brother)

Annis Lee Wister (née Furness; October 9, 1830 – November 15, 1908) was an American translator who published 42 books of German popular novels translated into English. Her books were published by J. B. Lippincott & Co. and became best sellers targeted toward women. She was the most well known translator of German popular fiction in the United States at the time.

== Early life ==
Wister was born in Philadelphia, Pennsylvania, on October 8, 1830, to Reverend William Henry Furness and Annis P. Jenks. She was educated mostly at home by her father. During the American Civil War, Wister worked in a hospital.

In her youth, Wister translated Struwwelpeter from German, and her father gave this translation to his friend Ralph Waldo Emerson. This version would be transcribed from memory by Emerson's now-adult children and published 65 years later.

== Career ==
Joshua Ballinger Lippincott, of J. B. Lippincott & Co., partnered with Wister to translate the popular stories of E. Marlitt written in the Ernst Keil published German magazine Die Gartenlaube. Her first publications in 1868 were the translations of E. Marlitt's The Old Mam'selle's Secret and Gold Elsie. In 1869, she contributed translations of the German serialized story Only No Love to Lippincott's Monthly Magazine.

In order to fuel the growing American appetite for German popular novels, she expanded her list of authors to translate to include Claire von Glumer, Ludwig Harder, Eva Hartner, Wilhemine Heimburg, E. Juncker, Fanny Lewald, Ursula Zoge von Manteuffel, E. Oswald, Golo Raimund, Hedwig Schobert, Ossip Schubin, and Ernst Wichert. Her works became best sellers targeted toward women interested in reading for leisure with stories filled with uplifting morals as well as cultural and social information.

She gained status as a literary critic of German novels. Advertisements for her books stated, "Mrs. Wister shows both admirable taste and unusual knowledge of current German literature in the novels which she selects for translation." She was known for not just providing a strict translation from German, but instead adding her own literary style to adapt the language to appeal to American audiences.

She was the most well known translator of German popular fiction in the United States at the time. She translated all ten of the novels of E. Marlitt and an additional 32 popular German novels written mostly by women. She worked at an extremely high rate with 38 of her 42 books published between 1868 and 1891.

In 1892, Lippincott re-released Wister's works in a boxed set with the ornamental covers of each book in different colors for easy recognition. The boxed set highlighted Wister's name on the cover, with the original German authors names relegated to the title page. In 1893, the State of Pennsylvania sent Wister's translation of E. Marlitt's ten novels to the World's Columbian Exposition for representation in the Library of the Women's Building. She did not publish anything for 16 years from 1891 until 1907 when she released her final book, The Lonely House: after the diaries of Herr Professor Dollnitz, a translation of Adolf Streckfuss' Das einsame Haus: nach den Tagebuchern des Herrn Professor Dollnitz.

She died on November 15, 1908, at her father's house in Wallingford, Pennsylvania, where she had lived for several years.

== Personal life ==
She married Dr. Caspar Wister in 1854. He was a fellow at the College of Physicians of Philadelphia and a descendant of Caspar Wistar, a glassmaker who emigrated to the United States in 1717. In 1869, her thirteen-year-old son, Caspar, died of what was described as "consumption of the bowels", most likely dysentery. Her husband died in 1888.

== Legacy ==
Her correspondence to her brother, Horace Howard Furness, is held at the Annenberg Rare Book Library at the University of Pennsylvania. Her correspondence to the famous physician Silas Weir Mitchell is held at the College of Physicians of Philadelphia.

== Publications ==
- Georg Blum and Ludwig Wahl, Seaside and Fireside Fairies (Philadelphia, 1864)
- E. Marlitt, Gold Elsie, Philadelphia: J.B. Lippincott & Co., 1869
- Wilhelmine von Hillern, Only a Girl, or a Physician for the Soul (1870)
- Julie Adeline von Volckhausen, Why Did He Not Die, Or, the Child from the Ebraergang (1871)
- E. Marlitt, The Little Moorland Princess, Philadelphia: J.B. Lippincott & Co., 1872
- Friedrich Wilhelm Hackländer, Enchanting and Enchanted, Philadelphia: J.B. Lippincott & Co., 1874
- Fanny Lewald, Hulda; or, The Deliverer, Philadelphia: J.B. Lippincott & Co., 1875
- E. Marlitt, The Second Wife (1874)
- E. Marlitt, The Old Mamselle's Secret, Philadelphia: J.B. Lippincott & Co., 1875
- E. Marlitt, The Countess Gisela, Philadelphia: J.B. Lippincott & Co., 1876
- Adolph Streckfuss, Castle Hohenwald A Romance, Philadelphia: J.B. Lippincott & Co., 1879
- E. Marlitt, The Bailiff's Maid, Philadelphia: J.B. Lippincott & Co., 1881
- Golo Raimund, From Hand to Hand, Philadelphia: J.B. Lippincott & Co., 1882
- Ursula Zoge Von Manteuffel, Violetta A Romance, Philadelphia: J.B. Lippincott Company, 1886
- Ernst Wichert, The Green Gate, Philadelphia: J.B. Lippincott Company, 1887
- Frederic Henry Hedge, Metrical Translations and Poems, Boston: Houghton, Mifflin and Company, 1888
- Ossip Schubin, Erlach Court, Philadelphia: J.B. Lippincott Company, 1889
- Ludwig Harder, A Family Feud, Philadelphia: J.B. Lippincott Company, 1897
