= Surrender (EP) =

EP by Paint It Black
- Released: August 18, 2009
- Recorded: April 2009
- Genre: Hardcore punk
- Length: 6:52
- Label: Fat Wreck
- Producer: Kurt Ballou

Paint It Black chronology
Amnesia (2009)	Surrender (2009)	Invisible (2013)

Surrender is the second EP from Philadelphia's Paint It Black. It was released by Fat Wreck Chords on August 18, 2009. It was released as a 7" single and a digital download. It is the second of two EPs the band released in 2009.

== Track listing ==
1. "Sacred" – 1:47
2. "Worms" – 2:17
3. "Cipher" – 0:46
4. "Surrender" – 2:02

== Personnel ==
- Dan Yemin – vocals, guitar
- Josh Agran – guitar
- Andy Nelson – bass guitar, vocals
- Jared Shavelson – drums
