= Amnesia (EP) =

EP by Paint It Black
- Released: June 16, 2009
- Recorded: April 2009
- Genre: Hardcore punk
- Length: 9:45
- Label: Bridge Nine
- Producer: Kurt Ballou

Paint It Black chronology
New Lexicon (2008)	Amnesia (2009)	Surrender (2009)

Professional ratings
Review scores
Source	Rating
Punknews.org	4.5/5 stars

Amnesia is the first EP from Philadelphia's Paint It Black. It was released by Bridge 9 Records on June 16, 2009. It was released as a 7" single and a digital download. It is the first of two EPs the band plans to release in 2009

== Track listing ==
1. "Salem" – 1:53
2. "Homesick" – 1:29
3. "Nicotine" – 1:20
4. "Amnesia" – 1:32
5. "Bliss" – 3:31

== Personnel ==
- Dan Yemin – vocals, guitar
- Josh Agran – guitar
- Andy Nelson – bass guitar, vocals
- Jared Shavelson – drums
