= The Missionary Position =

The missionary position is a sexual position.

The Missionary Position or Missionary Position may also refer to:

== Literature ==
- The Missionary Position, a 1992 satire of televangelism by Bruce Dickinson
- The Missionary Position: Mother Teresa in Theory and Practice, a 1995 extended essay by English-American journalist and literary critic Christopher Hitchens

== Music ==
- The Missionary Position (band), an American rock band
- "Missionary Position", a song by Heckle
- "Missionary Position", a song by Paint It Black from New Lexicon
- "Missionary Position", a song by Sparks from Hippopotamus

== Theatre and television ==
- The Missionary Position, a 2006 play by Keith Reddin
- "The Missionary Position" (NCIS), an episode of the television series NCIS
