= Devour (Dave Hause album) =

Studio album by Dave Hause
- Released: October 8, 2013
- Recorded: February–March 2013
- Genre: Rock, alternative rock, heartland rock, Americana
- Label: Rise Records
- Producer: Andrew Alekel, Mitchell Townsend

Dave Hause chronology
Resolutions (2011)	Devour (2013)	Bury Me in Philly (2017)

Devour is the second solo album from Dave Hause of The Loved Ones. It was released on October 8, 2013 by Rise Records.

The album was recorded at Grandmaster Recorders from mid-February to mid-March 2013. Musicians include bassist Bob Thomson of Big Drill Car, drummer David Hidalgo Jr. of Social Distortion and keyboardist Bo Koster of My Morning Jacket. The album also features appearances by Scott Hutchison of Frightened Rabbit, Matt Skiba of Alkaline Trio and The Watson Twins.

The first song premiered from the album was "We Could Be Kings", which was released for streaming at RollingStone.com on July 12, 2013. The second song available for streaming was "The Shine", which was released on August 26, 2013.

== Track listing ==
1. "Damascus"
2. "The Great Depression"
3. "We Could Be Kings"
4. "Autism Vaccine Blues"
5. "Same Disease"
6. "Before"
7. "Father's Son"
8. "Stockholm Syndrome"
9. "Becoming Secular"
10. "The Shine"
11. "Bricks"
12. "Benediction"

== Personnel ==
- Dave Hause – lead vocals, guitar
- Mitchell Townsend – guitar
- Bob Thomson – bass
- David Hidalgo, Jr. – drums
- Bo Koster – keyboards
- Scott Hutchison, Matt Skiba and The Watson Twins – background vocals
