= Bury Me in Philly =

Studio album by Dave Hause
- Released: February 3, 2017
- Recorded: August – September 2016
- Genre: Rock, alternative rock, heartland rock, Americana
- Label: Rise

Dave Hause chronology
Devour (2013)	Bury Me in Philly (2017)	Kick (2019)

Singles from Bury Me in Philly
- 1. "With You" Released: December 8, 2016

Bury Me in Philly is the third solo album by Dave Hause of The Loved Ones. It was released on February 3, 2017, by Rise Records.

The first song premiered from the album was "With You", which was released for streaming at Noisey on December 8, 2016, and was released on iTunes and Spotify soon after.

== Critical reception ==
Professional ratings
Aggregate scores
Source	Rating
Metacritic	77/100
Review scores
Source	Rating
Away from Home	Positive
Q	4/5 stars
Rock Sound	Positive

Bury Me in Philly received mostly positive reviews from music critics. Q gave the album 4 stars, and referred to it as "A moving reflection on his own life, family and home, it's the sound of Dave Hause getting to grips with himself."

== Track listing ==
No.	Title	Length
1.	"With You"	2:39
2.	"The Flinch"	3:34
3.	"My Mistake"	2:58
4.	"The Mermaid"	3:19
5.	"Shaky Jesus"	3:41
6.	"Divine Lorraine"	3:21
7.	"Dirty Fucker"	3:01
8.	"The Ride"	3:02
9.	"Helluva Home"	3:35
10.	"Wild Love"	3:53
11.	"Bury Me In Philly"	3:13

== Charts ==
Chart (2017)	Peak position
German Albums (Offizielle Top 100)	79
US Independent Albums (Billboard)	15
US Top Album Sales (Billboard)	61
US Vinyl Albums (Billboard)	4
