= Invisible (EP) =

EP by Paint It Black
- Released: April 2, 2013
- Genre: Hardcore punk
- Length: 10:51
- Label: No Idea

Paint It Black chronology
Surrender (2009)	Invisible (2013)	Famine (2023)

Professional ratings
Review scores
Source	Rating
AbsolutePunk.net	90%

Invisible is an EP from Philadelphia's Paint It Black. It was released by No Idea Records on April 2, 2013. It was the band's first release since 2009's Surrender.

== Track listing ==
1. "Greetings, Fellow Insomniacs" – 1:42
2. "Headfirst" – 2:26
3. "Props for Ventriloquism" – 1:38
4. "Little Fists" – 2:07
5. "D.F.W." – 0:34
6. "Invisible" – 2:24

== Personnel ==
- Dan Yemin – vocals, guitar
- Josh Agran – guitar
- Andy Nelson – bass guitar, vocals
- Jared Shavelson – drums
