= CVA =

CVA may refer to:

== Education ==
- Carrabassett Valley Academy, a ski and snowboard academy, Maine, US
- College of Visual Arts, Minnesota, US
- Conservatorium van Amsterdam, a conservatory of music in the Netherlands
- Contextual value added, UK school statistic

== Veterinary ==
- Common Veterinary Area, as defined by the agreement between the EU and the Swiss Confederation
- Certified Veterinary Assistant, a professional designation in the U.S.

== Military ==
- US Navy hull classification symbol for attack aircraft carriers
- Cape Town Volunteer Artillery, South Africa, now Cape Field Artillery

== Economics ==
- Credit valuation adjustment, the market value of counterparty credit risk
- Company voluntary arrangement, UK, for companies in insolvency

== Other ==
- Cash and Voucher Assistance, a type of humanitarian aid program
- CVA (album), by Paint It Black
- Cerebrovascular accident, commonly known as a stroke
- Christian Vegetarian Association
- Corpus Vasorum Antiquorum, documenting ancient ceramics
- Conservation Volunteers Australia, an Australian organization to provide better environment
- Cis-vaccenyl acetate, an insect pheromone
- Vatican City, ITU country code
- Connecticut Valley Arms, a firearm brand in the US
- Concerned Veterans for America, an American veterans advocacy organization
- Coyote vs. Acme, a 2026 hybrid film
