= Paint It Black (band) =

American hardcore punk band

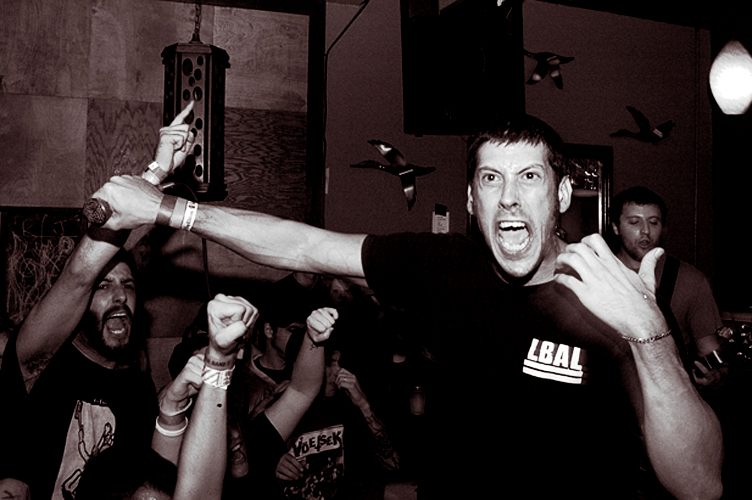
- The band performing in 2006

Background information
- Origin: Philadelphia, Pennsylvania, U.S.
- Genres: Hardcore punk, melodic hardcore
- Years active: 2002–present
- Labels: Jade Tree, Bridge Nine, Fat Wreck Chords, Revelation
- Members: Dan Yemin; Andy Nelson; Josh Agran; Jared Shavelson
- Past members: Colin McGinniss; Dave Hause; Matt Miller; David Wagenschutz

Paint It Black is an American modern hardcore punk band from Philadelphia. Their music is also described as melodic hardcore, which is characterized by fast tempos, catchy melodies, and emotionally charged singing and shouting. They have released three full-length albums, CVA, Paradise and New Lexicon on Jade Tree Records.

The band features Dan Yemin as the group's vocalist and lyricist. Yemin is most known as the guitarist for New Jersey's Lifetime and was also the guitarist of another Philadelphia-based punk/hardcore act, Kid Dynamite. Former drummer David Wagenshutz has also been a member of Lifetime, Kid Dynamite, California's Good Riddance and None More Black, the latter of whom is fronted by former Kid Dynamite vocalist Jason Shevchuk. The other two members, bassist Andy Nelson and guitarist Josh Agran, both also currently play in Affirmative Action Jackson, a hardcore punk band based in Philadelphia. Wagenschutz left in July 2006 to pursue his family and new band Higher Giant, and has since been replaced by Jared Shavelson of The Hope Conspiracy and None More Black.

In 2009, instead of recording a single full-length LP, they released nine new songs over two 7-inch EPs released by two different labels. The first one, Amnesia, was released on June 16, 2009, on Bridge Nine Records. The second one, Surrender, was released in August 2009 on Fat Wreck Chords. In 2013, the band's next release came in the form of the EP Invisible. In 2023, the band signed with Revelation Records, with their first album in 10 years, Famine, released on November 3.

== Members ==
Current

- Dan Yemin – vocals (2002–present)
- Andy Nelson – bass (2002–present)
- Josh Agran – guitar (2005–present)
- Jared Shavelson – drums (2006–present)

Former

- Colin McGinniss – guitar (2004–2005)
- Dave Hause – guitar (2002–2004)
- Matt Miller – guitar (2002)
- David Wagenschutz – drums (2002–2006)

== Discography ==
=== Albums ===
- CVA (2003)
- Paradise (2005)
- New Lexicon (2008)
- Famine (2023)

=== Singles/EPs ===
- Demo (2002)
- "Goliath" single (2008)
  - A one-sided 7-inch single that was given away to everyone that came to their show on January 6, 2008, at the First Unitarian Church of Philadelphia.
- Amnesia (2009)
- Surrender (2009)
- Invisible (2013)
- Famine (2023)

=== Compilation appearances ===
- Location Is Everything, Vol. 1 (2002)
  - Includes "Another Beautiful 'Fuck You' Song!", later re-recorded as "Bravo, Another Beautiful 'Fuck You' Song!" for CVA
- The Philadelphia Sound (2002)
  - Includes "The Pharmacist", later re-recorded for Paradise, and "An Hour And A Half Late For Happy Hour", exclusive to this release
- Take Action! Vol. 3 (2003)
  - Includes "Void", from CVA
- AMP Magazine Presents, Volume 1: Hardcore (2004)
  - Includes "Head Hurts. Hands on Fire", from CVA
- Location Is Everything, Vol. 2 (2004)
  - Includes "Womb Envy" from CVA and an exclusive live version of "The Pharmacist" from Paradise
- In Honor: A Compilation to Beat Cancer (2004)
  - Includes "Fresh Kill (Live)", a live version of "Exit Wounds" from Paradise
- It Hits The Fan Vol. 1 (2005)
  - Includes "Exit Wounds", from Paradise
- Prisoners of War: A Benefit for Peter Young (2007)
  - Includes "The New Brutality", from Paradise
- Bridge Nine Summer Compilation (2009)
  - Includes "Salem", from Amnesia
