= Higher Giant =

- Origin: New York City, New York, United States
- Genres: Punk rock Pop punk Melodic hardcore
- Years active: 2007-present
- Labels: Runner Up Records; Creep Records; Black Numbers Records
- Past members: Ernie Parada; Alex Volonino; Dave Wagenschutz; Jason Lehrhoff
- Website: www.myspace.com/highergiant

Higher Giant is an American, New York City-based punk rock supergroup. The band was formed in 2007 by Ernie Parada, Jason Lehrhoff, and Alex Volonino, who were in The Arsons together, and Dave Wagenschutz.

Higher Giant released two EPs in 2009. The First Five was released in March 2009 by Runner Up Records and Creep Records. Then, Al's Moustache was released in August 2009 by Black Numbers Records.

== Members ==
- Ernie Parada (In Your Face, Token Entry, Black Train Jack, John Henry, Grey Area, The Arsons) – vocals, guitar
- Jason Lehrhoff (Warzone, Greyarea, The Arsons) – guitar
- Alex Volonino (The Arsons) – bass
- Dave Wagenschutz (Lifetime, Kid Dynamite, Good Riddance, Paint It Black) – drums

== Discography ==
- The First Five (2009, Runner Up Records/Creep Records)
- Al's Moustache (2009, Black Numbers)
