= Resolutions (album) =

Studio album by Dave Hause
- Released: January 24, 2011
- Recorded: 2009–2010
- Genre: Rock, folk rock, heartland rock, Americana
- Length: 33:36
- Label: Paper + Plastick
- Producer: Pete Steinkopf

Dave Hause chronology
Resolutions (2011)	Devour (2013)

Resolutions is the first solo album from Dave Hause of The Loved Ones. It was released on January 24, 2011 through Paper + Plastick and was re-released by Rise Records on March 26, 2013.

The album was recorded at Salad Days Studio in Beltsville, Maryland, and Little Eden in Asbury Park, New Jersey, during the winter of 2009-2010. The album was produced by Pete Steinkopf and features a set of musicians who were Hause's family and friends, including The Loved Ones' bass player Chris Gonzalez playing electric guitar, former bass player Michael "Spider" Cotterman playing bass, Brendan Hill of Step Ahead and The Curse playing drums and Dave's sister Melissa Hause playing piano and B3 organ.

On 12 April 2011 a video was released for the song "Time Will Tell" The video pays homage to the 1967 Martin Scorsese short film The Big Shave.

== Track listing ==
1. "Time Will Tell" – 2:57
2. "Melanin" – 3:36
3. "C'mon Kid" – 4:03
4. "Pray For Tucson" – 3:25
5. "Resolutions" – 4:03
6. "Prague (Revive Me)" – 3:03
7. "Heavy Heart" – 2:54
8. "Years From Now" – 2:13
9. "Rankers & Rotters" – 3:34
10. "Meet Me At The Lanes" – 4:20

== Credits ==
- Dave Hause – lead vocals, acoustic guitar, electric guitar, percussion
- Michael "Spider" Cotterman – bass
- Brendan Hill – drums, tambourine, percussion
- Melissa Hause – piano, B3 organ
- Chris Gonzalez – electric guitar
- Mitchell Townsend – electric guitar, lap steel
- Pete Steinkopf – electric guitar
- Ericka Pfeiffer-Hause – vocals
- Jesse Skokos – B3 organ
- David W. Hause – acoustic guitar
- Chris Wollard – vocals

Produced, engineered and mixed by Pete Steinkopf. Mastered by Stephen Egerton
