= Icons (None More Black album) =

Studio album by None More Black
- Released: October 26, 2010
- Recorded: May–August 2010
- Genre: Punk rock
- Label: Fat Wreck Chords
- Producer: Will Yip

None More Black chronology
This Is Satire (2006)	Icons (2010)

Icons is the third studio album by None More Black, released on Fat Wreck Chords on October 26, 2010. It is the first album to feature new drummer Richard Minino.

Writing began in February 2009.

== Track listing ==
All tracks are written by None More Black.

No.	Title	Length
1.	"Mr. Artistic"	3:47
2.	"StillsSternLange&Norris"	1:47
3.	"Cupcake Wednesday"	2:11
4.	"Here Comes Devereux"	4:12
5.	"I'm Warning You with Peace & Love"	3:00
6.	"When Mickey Died"	2:53
7.	"Iron Mouth Act"	2:26
8.	"Sinatra After Dark"	4:05
9.	"Backpedal"	2:52
10.	"Gary Page One in Pink"	3:04
11.	"Budapest Gambit"	3:22
Total length:		33:33
