= Bertha Frederich =

German novelist

Bertha Frederich née Heyn (1825 - May 10, 1882 Koblenz) was a German novelist. She used pseudonyms, including Golo Raimund.

== Biography ==
She was born in 1825, in the Kingdom of Hanover. She married Eduard Frederich, editor of the Hannöverscher Courier, in which her first writings appeared. In order to conceal her identity, she used various pseudonyms—going so far as to have the true authorship of her novels ascribed to a fictitious personage, Georg Dannenberg. She wrote, in all, about 22 novels, nearly all of which have been republished.

== Works ==
- Bauernleben (3d ed. 1888)
- Zwei Bräute (4th ed. 1888)
- Schloss Elkrath (3d ed. 1885)
- Von Hand zu Hand (2d ed. 1885, Eng. trans. by Annis Lee Wister, 1882)
- Mein ist die Rache (3d ed. 1885)
- Zwei Menschenalter (3d ed. 1886)
- Ein deutsches Weib (5th ed. 1886)
- Ein hartes Herz (1860, 4th ed. 1897)
- Gebrüder Spalding (1857, 4th ed. 1897)
- Ein Familienschmuck (1858, 4th ed. 1896)
- Bürgerlich Blut (1859, 4th ed. 1889)
