= File Under Black =

Studio album by None More Black
- Released: June 3, 2003
- Recorded: February 2003
- Genre: Punk
- Length: 34:55
- Label: Fat Wreck
- Producer: Nick Rotundo

None More Black chronology
Demo (2001)	File Under Black (2003)	Loud About Loathing (2004)

Professional ratings
Review scores
Source	Rating
Voice of Reason	(not rated) link

File Under Black is None More Black's first full-length album. It was released on Fat Wreck Chords.

== Track listing ==
1. "Everyday Balloons" – 1:53
2. "Dinner's for Suckers" – 1:50
3. "The Ratio of People To Cake" – 2:21
4. "Never Heard of Corduroy" – 2:46
5. "Banned from Teen Arts" – 2:51
6. "Risk Management" – 1:59
7. "Drop the Pop" – 3:10
8. "Bizarro Me" – 2:16
9. "Nods to Nothing" – 2:44
10. "Ice Cream with the Enemy" – 2:58
11. "The Affiliates" – 3:53
12. "Zero Tolerance Drum Policy" – 2:02
13. "M.A.T.T.H." – 1:57
14. "Wishing There Were Walkways" – 2:19

== Trivia ==
- Many of the song titles reference Seinfeld including "Everyday Balloons", "Dinner's for Suckers", "Never Heard of Corduroy", "Risk Management", "Bizarro Me", "Nods to Nothing" and "Wishing There Were Walkways".
- "The Ratio of People to Cake" is a reference to Office Space.
- "Ice Cream With The Enemy" is a reference to D2: The Mighty Ducks.
