= Distractions (The Loved Ones EP) =

EP by The Loved Ones
- Released: February 3, 2009
- Recorded: 2008
- Genre: Punk rock; Americana; pop-punk
- Length: 15:49
- Label: Fat Wreck Chords

The Loved Ones chronology
Build & Burn (2008)	Distractions (2009)

Professional ratings
Review scores
Source	Rating
AbsolutePunk.net	(84%)
Allmusic	3.5/5 stars
Rockmidgets.com	3/5 stars

Distractions is the second EP and latest record by American punk rock band The Loved Ones. It is an EP that consists of three original songs and three covers. The covers are "Johnny 99" by Bruce Springsteen from his 1982 album Nebraska, "Lovers Town Revisited" from Billy Bragg's 1983 album Life's a Riot with Spy vs Spy, and "Coma Girl" by Joe Strummer and The Mescaleros from their 2003 album Streetcore. "Spy Diddley" and "Lovers Town Revisited" are taken from the band's Keep Your Heart album sessions.

The track "Distracted" was released on the band's MySpace page on January 24, 2009.

== Track listing ==
No.	Title	Length
1.	"Distracted"	3:15
2.	"Last Call"	3:06
3.	"Spy Diddley"	2:03
4.	"Johnny 99" (Bruce Springsteen cover)	2:43
5.	"Lovers Town Revisited" (Billy Bragg cover)	1:18
6.	"Coma Girl" (Joe Strummer and The Mescaleros cover)	3:22

== Personnel ==
- Dave Hause – vocals, guitar
- Chris Gonzalez – bass, vocals, guitar
- Mike Sneeringer – drums
- David Walsh – guitar
- Michael "Spider" Cotterman – bass (on tracks 3 and 5)
- Franz Nicolay – organ, piano
