= Build & Burn =

Studio album by The Loved Ones
- Released: February 5, 2008
- Recorded: 2007
- Genre: Punk rock; pop-punk
- Length: 32:52
- Label: Fat Wreck Chords
- Producer: Pete Steinkopf and Bryan Keinlen

The Loved Ones chronology
Keep Your Heart (2006)	Build & Burn (2008)	Distractions (2009)

Professional ratings
Review scores
Source	Rating
ThePunksite.com	link
AbsolutePunk.net	(81%) link
Allmusic	link
Rockmidgets.com	link
Punknews.org	4/5 stars

Build & Burn is the second album by American punk rock band The Loved Ones. It was released on February 5, 2008 through Fat Wreck Chords. The album was produced by Pete Steinkopf and Bryan Keinlen from The Bouncing Souls and features cameos from The Hold Steady's Franz Nicolay and Tad Kubler. A music video was released for the song "The Bridge".

== Track listing ==
1. "Pretty Good Year" – 2:14
2. "The Inquirer" – 3:31
3. "The Bridge" – 3:28
4. "Sarah’s Game" – 3:25
5. "Brittle Heart" – 2:39
6. "Selfish Masquerade" – 4:01
7. "3rd Shift" – 2:54
8. "Louisiana" – 3:38
9. "Dear Laura" – 2:49
10. "I Swear" – 4:13

== Credits ==
- Dave Hause – vocals, guitar
- Chris Gonzalez – bass, guitar
- Mike Sneeringer – drums
- David Walsh – guitar
- Franz Nicolay – piano, Hammond B3, organ, harmonica, accordion, saw
- Tad Kubler – guitar solo on track 8
- Ericka Pfeiffer-Hause - additional vocals
- Buick Audra – additional vocals
- Pete Steinkopf – additional guitar
