= Loud About Loathing =

EP by None More Black
- Genre: Punk
- Label: Sabot

None More Black chronology
File Under Black (2003)	Loud About Loathing (2004)	This Is Satire (2006)

Loud About Loathing is an EP by None More Black. It was released in 2004.

== Track listing ==
1. "Oh, There's Legwork" - 3:17
2. "Peace on Mars, 'Cause You Ain't Gonna Get it Here" - 2:29
3. "Traffic is a Global Word"- 2:14
4. "Genuine Malaise and Misery" - 1:55
5. "iScrapbook" - 2:53
6. "I'll Buy You the Fucking Single"- 2:42
