= New Lexicon =

Studio album by Paint It Black
- Released: February 19, 2008
- Recorded: August – September 2007
- Genre: Hardcore punk
- Length: 30:26
- Label: Jade Tree
- Producer: J. Robbins, Oktopus, Paint It Black

Paint It Black chronology
Paradise (2005)	New Lexicon (2008)	Amnesia EP (2009)

Professional ratings
Review scores
Source	Rating
Allmusic	3.5/5 stars
Prefix Magazine	7/10 stars
Punknews.org	4.5/5 stars

New Lexicon is the third full-length album from Philadelphia's Paint It Black. It was released on Jade Tree Records on February 19, 2008. Over a month before the album's release date, on January 6, the band gave away copies of the Goliath 7" single to everyone that came out to their record release show at the First Unitarian Church of Philadelphia.

== Track listing ==
1. "The Ledge" - 1:31
2. "Four Deadly Venoms" - 1:37
3. "We Will Not" - 2:48
4. "Past Tense, Future Perfect" - 2:20
5. "Missionary Position" - 1:40
6. "White Kids Dying of Hunger" - 2:07
7. "Gravity Wins" - 2:49
8. "Dead Precedents" - 0:46
9. "The Beekeeper" - 1:53
10. "Check Yr Math" - 1:28
11. "So Much for Honour Among Thieves" - 1:50
12. "New Folk Song" - 2:15
13. "Saccharine" - 1:26
14. "Severance" - 3:22
15. "Shell Game Redux" - 2:37

== Personnel ==
- Dan Yemin – vocals, guitar
- Josh Agran – guitar
- Andy Nelson – bass guitar, vocals
- Jared Shavelson – drums
