= Paradise (Paint It Black album) =

Studio album by Paint It Black
- Released: March 8, 2005
- Recorded: September 2004
- Genre: Hardcore punk
- Length: 21:03
- Label: Jade Tree
- Producer: J. Robbins, Paint It Black

Paint It Black chronology
CVA (2003)	Paradise (2005)	New Lexicon (2008)

Professional ratings
Review scores
Source	Rating
Allmusic	3.5/5 stars
Aversion.com	
Punk International	(90/100)
Punknews.org	4.5/5 stars

Paradise is the second full-length album from Philadelphia's Paint It Black, which followed up the band's debut LP from 2003, CVA. It features a more melodic hardcore sound than previous releases from the band, and was met with a slightly more positive critical reception than CVA.

== Track listing ==
1. "Election Day" – 1:09
2. "Pink Slip" – 1:27
3. "Exit Wounds" – 1:37 mp3
4. "Ghosts" – 1:35
5. "The New Brutality" – 1:38 (featured in the video game Tony Hawk's Proving Ground)
6. "Atheists in Foxholes" – 1:41
7. "Nicaragua" – 1:33
8. "Labor Day" – 1:22
9. "Burn the Hive" – 1:29
10. "Panic" – 1:44 (featured in the video game Saints Row)
11. "Angel" – 1:22
12. "The Pharmacist" – 1:07
13. "365" – 1:40
14. "Memorial Day" – 1:39
15. "View from a Headlock" – 1:56 (only on Japanese and Bandcamp versions)

== Personnel ==
- Dan Yemin – vocals, guitar
- Colin McGinniss – lead guitar
- Andy Nelson – bass guitar, vocals
- David Wagenschutz – drums
- Jason Yawn – guest vocals
- J. Robbins – production, recording, mixing
- Alan Douches – mastering
- Kim Dumas – mastering assistance
- Tim Gough – design
