= This Is Satire =

Studio album by None More Black
- Released: May 2, 2006
- Recorded: During December 2005 - January 2006 at Magpie Cage in Baltimore
- Genre: Punk rock
- Length: 33:19
- Label: Fat Wreck Chords
- Producer: J. Robbins

None More Black chronology
Loud About Loathing (2004)	This Is Satire (2006)	Icons (2010)

Professional ratings
Review scores
Source	Rating
AllMusic	4/5 stars
Alternative Press	5/5 stars
Punknews.org	5/5 stars

This Is Satire is None More Black's second full-length album. It was released on Fat Wreck Chords in May 2006.

The title "We Dance on the Ruins of the Stupid Stage" is taken from a line in the film Mallrats.

== Track listing ==
1. "We Dance on the Ruins of the Stupid Stage" – 3:32
2. "Under My Feet" – 2:24
3. "My Wallpaper Looks Like Paint" – 2:14
4. "Zing-Pong" – 2:52
5. "With the Transit Coat On" – 2:22
6. "Opinions & Assholes" – 1:47
7. "I See London" – 3:58
8. "Who Crosses State Lines Without a Shirt?" – 2:25
9. "D Is for Doorman (Come on In)" – 4:08
10. "10 Ton Jiggawatts" – 2:42
11. "You Suck! But Your Peanut Butter Is OK" – 1:40
12. "Yo, It's Not Rerun" – 2:10
13. "Majestic" – 3:45
