= Horace Howard Furness =

American Shakespearean scholar

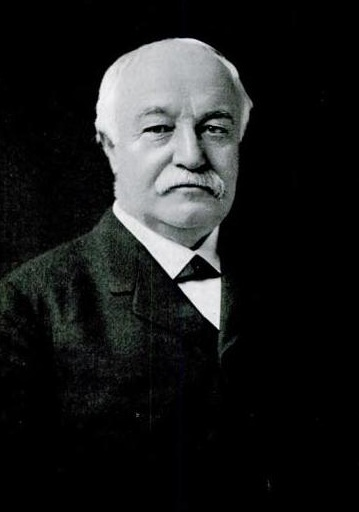
- Born: November 2, 1833; Philadelphia, Pennsylvania, U.S.
- Died: August 13, 1912 (aged 78); Wallingford, Pennsylvania, U.S.
- Resting place: Laurel Hill Cemetery, Philadelphia, Pennsylvania, U.S.
- Spouse: Helen Kate (Rogers) Furness
- Children: Walter Rogers Furness; Horace Howard Furness Jr. William Henry Furness III; Caroline Augusta (Furness) Jayne
- Parent(s): William Henry Furness; Annis Pulling (Jenks) Furness

Signature
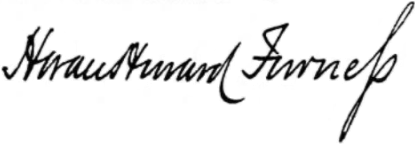

Horace Howard Furness (November 2, 1833 – August 13, 1912) was an American Shakespearean scholar of the 19th- and early 20th- centuries.

== Life and career ==
Horace Furness was the son of the Unitarian minister and abolitionist William Henry Furness (1802–1896), and brother of the architect Frank Furness (1839–1912). He graduated from Harvard University in 1854, embarked on a journey to Europe with Atherton Blight, and then studied in Germany. After returning to the United States, he was admitted to the Philadelphia Bar in 1858, but his growing deafness interfered with the practice of law.

In 1860, he joined the Shakspere Society of Philadelphia, an amateur study group that took its scholarship seriously. As he later wrote:

Every member had a copy of the Variorum of 1821, which we fondly believed had gathered under each play all Shakespearian lore worth preserving down to that date. What had been added since that year was scattered in many different editions, and in numberless volumes dispersed over the whole domain of literature. To gather these stray items of criticism was real toil, real but necessary if we did not wish our labour over the text to be in vain.

As editor of the "New Variorum" editions of Shakespeare—also called the "Furness Variorum"—he collected in a single source 300 years of references, antecedent works, influences and commentaries. He devoted more than forty years to the series, completing the annotation of sixteen plays. His son, Horace Howard Furness Jr. (1865–1930), joined as co-editor of the Variorum's later volumes, and continued the project after the father's death, annotating three additional plays and revising two others.

Nowhere, perhaps, has more labor been devoted to the study of the works of the poet than that given by Mr. H. H. Furness, of Philadelphia, to the preparation of the new Variorum edition. — Sir Sidney Lee

He was a lecturer at the University of Pennsylvania, a long-serving trustee (1880–1904), and chairman of the building committee for its library. Designed by his brother Frank, Horace selected the Shakepearean quotes for the 1891 building's leaded glass windows. He was the advisor for doctoral student Emily Jordan Folger who, with her husband Henry Clay Folger, would co-found the Folger Shakespeare Library in Washington, DC.

An 1890 review in Blackwood's Magazine may indicate the esteem in which British critics held Furness's scholarship:

In what is called 'The Variorum Edition of Shakespeare,' America has the honor of having produced the very best and most complete edition, so far as it has gone, of our great national poet. For text, illustration (happily, not pictorial), commentary and criticism, it leaves nothing to be desired. The editor combines with the patience and accuracy of the textural scholar, an industry which has overlooked nothing of value that has been written about Shakespeare by the best German and French, as well as English commentators and critics; and what is of no less moment he possesses in himself a rare delicacy of literary appreciation and breadth of judgment, disciplined by familiarity with all that is best in the literature of antiquity as well as of modern times, which he brings to bear on his notes with great effect.

Furness was a founding member of the Philobiblon Club of Philadelphia in 1893. He died on August 13, 1912, and was interred at Laurel Hill Cemetery in Philadelphia.

== New Variorum ==
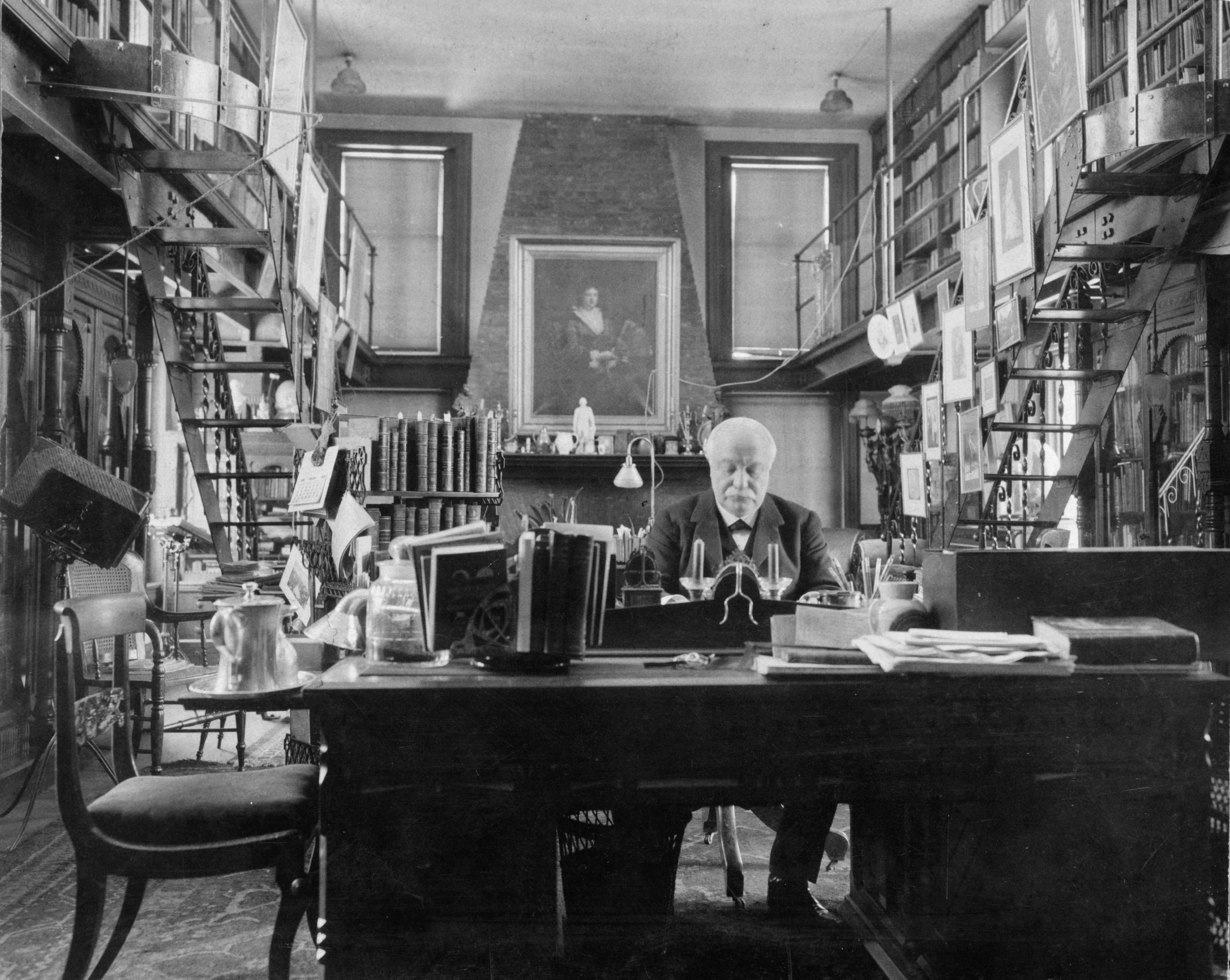
Horace Howard Furness in his brick library at "Lindenshade," c. 1910

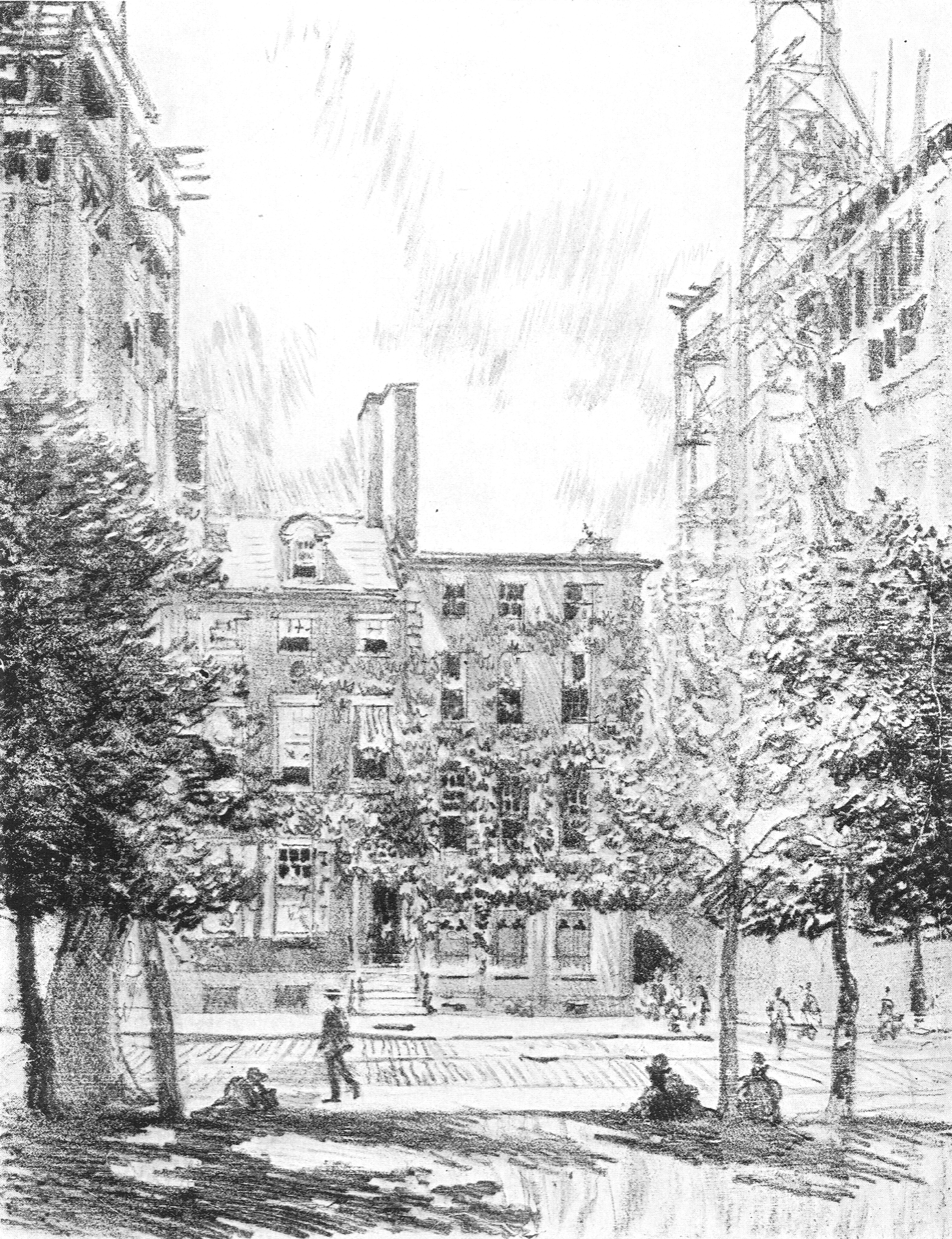
"Dr. Furness's House, West Washington Square, just before it was torn down." (1914), Joseph Pennell.

=== Volumes edited by Horace Howard Furness ===
These volumes went through a number of reprints: the external links connect to the last online edition available.

- Romeo and Juliet (published 1871)
- Macbeth (1873)
- Hamlet, vol. 1 (1877)
- Hamlet, vol. 2 (1877)
- King Lear (1880)
- Othello (1886)
- Merchant of Venice (1888)
- As You Like It (1891, copyright 1890)
- The Tempest (1892)
- A Midsommer Nights Dreame (1895)
- The Winter's Tale (1898)
- Twelfth Night (1901)
- Much Ado About Nothing (1904)
- Love's Labors Lost (1904)
- Anthony and Cleopatra (1907)
- Richard III (1908)
- Cymbeline (1913) (published posthumously)

=== Volumes edited by H. H. Furness, Jr. ===
- Julius Caesar (Google books preview only) (1913)
- Macbeth (revised) (1903, 2nd ed. 1915)
- Merchant of Venice (revised) (1916)
- King John (1919)
- Coriolanus (1928)

The Modern Language Association of America continues the "New Variorum" project with the goal of definitively annotating all 38 of Shakespeare's plays.

== Other works ==
- F. R. (1903). Philadelphia: privately printed. (A memorial of brother-in-law Fairman Rogers, signed H. H. F.)
- Jayne, Horace H. F., ed. (1922). The Letters of Horace Howard Furness. Boston: Houghton Mifflin. Volume 1 · Volume 2
- Haupt, Paul; Furness, H. H., eds. (1893–1904). The Sacred Books of the Old and New Testaments. A New English Translation. With Explanatory Notes and Pictorial Illustrations. Prepared by eminent Biblical scholars of Europe and of America. (Polychrome Bible). New York: Dodd, Mead & Co.
- Wellhausen, Julius (1898). The Book of Psalms : a new English translation. Polychrome Bible, part 14. Translated by H. H. Furness (psalms); John Taylor (notes); J. A. Paterson (appendix). New York: Dodd, Mead & Co.
- Records of a lifelong friendship, 1807-1882: Ralph Waldo Emerson and William Henry Furness (1910), edited by H. H. F. (Horace Howard Furness). Boston and New York: Houghton Mifflin

== Honors ==
Furness was elected to membership in the American Philosophical Society on April 16, 1880. He was the recipient of honorary degrees from Harvard University, University of Halle, University of Pennsylvania, Columbia University, and University of Cambridge. He was elected a member of the American Academy of Arts and Letters in 1905.

== Personal ==
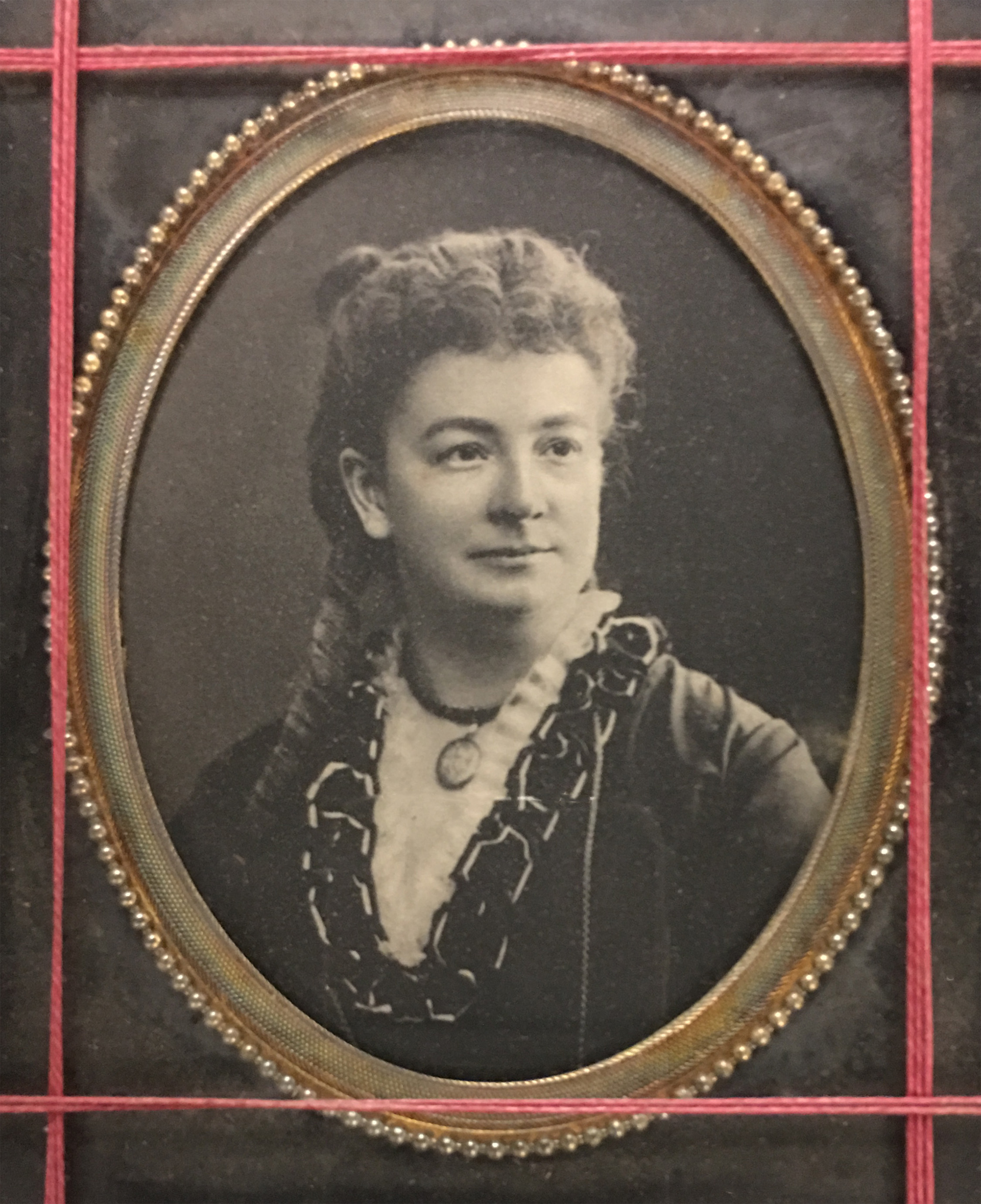
Helen Kate Furness, (c. 1880)

In 1860 Furness married Helen Kate Rogers (1837–1883), heir to an ironmaking fortune and sister of University of Pennsylvania instructor Fairman Rogers. She compiled a concordance to Shakespeare's poems, published in 1874. They had four children:

- Walter Rogers Furness (1861–February 7, 1914), an architect, who in 1896 became a partner in the firm of his uncle, Frank Furness. He designed and built Furness Cottage at the Jekyll Island Club, Georgia, where his family vacationed from 1889 to 1895. He was permanently blinded in one eye in 1898, after a ball hit him during a game of racquets. From then on his life became worse and worse, descending into raging alcoholism. His wife, Helen Key Bullitt, died at age 47 in January 1914, and he died a month later at age 53, following a heart attack.
- Horace Howard Furness Jr. (1865–1930), who continued his father's work on the New Variorum project. Author of a play, The Gloss of Youth : an imaginary episode in the lives of William Shakespeare and John Fletcher (1920).
- William Henry Furness III, (1866–1920), an explorer and ethnologist. One of the University of Pennsylvania medical students depicted in Thomas Eakins's painting The Agnew Clinic (1889). Undertook anthropological expeditions to the South Pacific with Hiram M. Hiller, Jr. and Alfred C. Harrison Jr., and wrote books and articles about Borneo and Polynesia. Died unmarried.
- Caroline Augusta Furness (1873–1909), also an ethnologist, she married University of Pennsylvania instructor Horace Jayne, and died from a heart attack at age 35 in 1909. Their children were Kate Furness Jayne and Horace H. F. Jayne, an art historian and museum director.

Horace and Kate Furness inherited her family's Philadelphia city house, at the SW corner of Locust Street & West Washington Square. Frank Furness altered the house in 1873, and designed the 1909 office building that replaced it. He also designed their country house, "Lindenshade" (c. 1873, demolished 1940) and its many expansions, including the 1903 fireproof brick library.

== Legacy ==
- Horace Howard Furness High School in South Philadelphia is named for him.
- Horace Jr. donated his father's Shakespearean collection to the University of Pennsylvania, whose Horace Howard Furness Memorial Library honors both father and son.
- William Henry Furness III donated the land for the Helen Kate Furness Free Library in Wallingford, Pennsylvania, built in 1916 on the former grounds of his parents' country house, "Lindenshade."
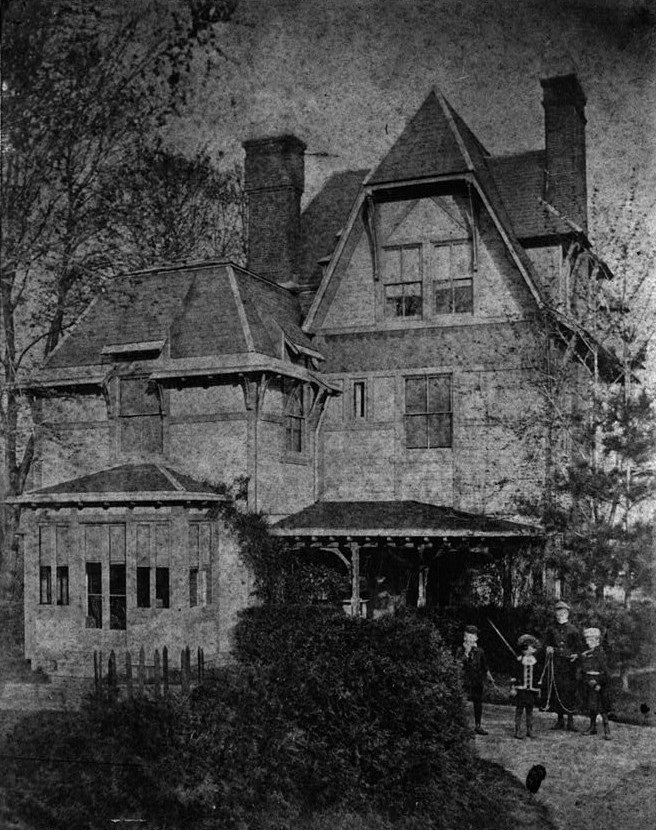
"Lindenshade" (built c. 1873, demolished 1940), Wallingford, Pennsylvania, designed by Frank Furness

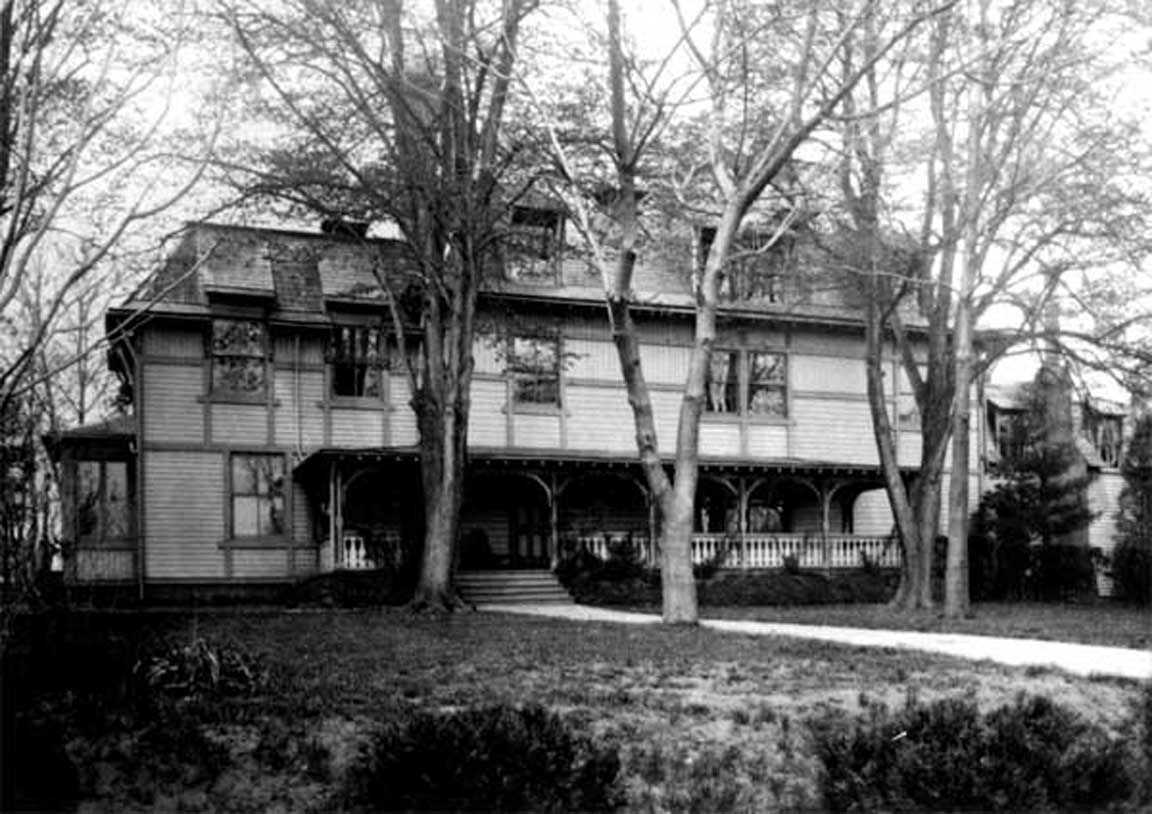
"Lindenshade," circa 1888

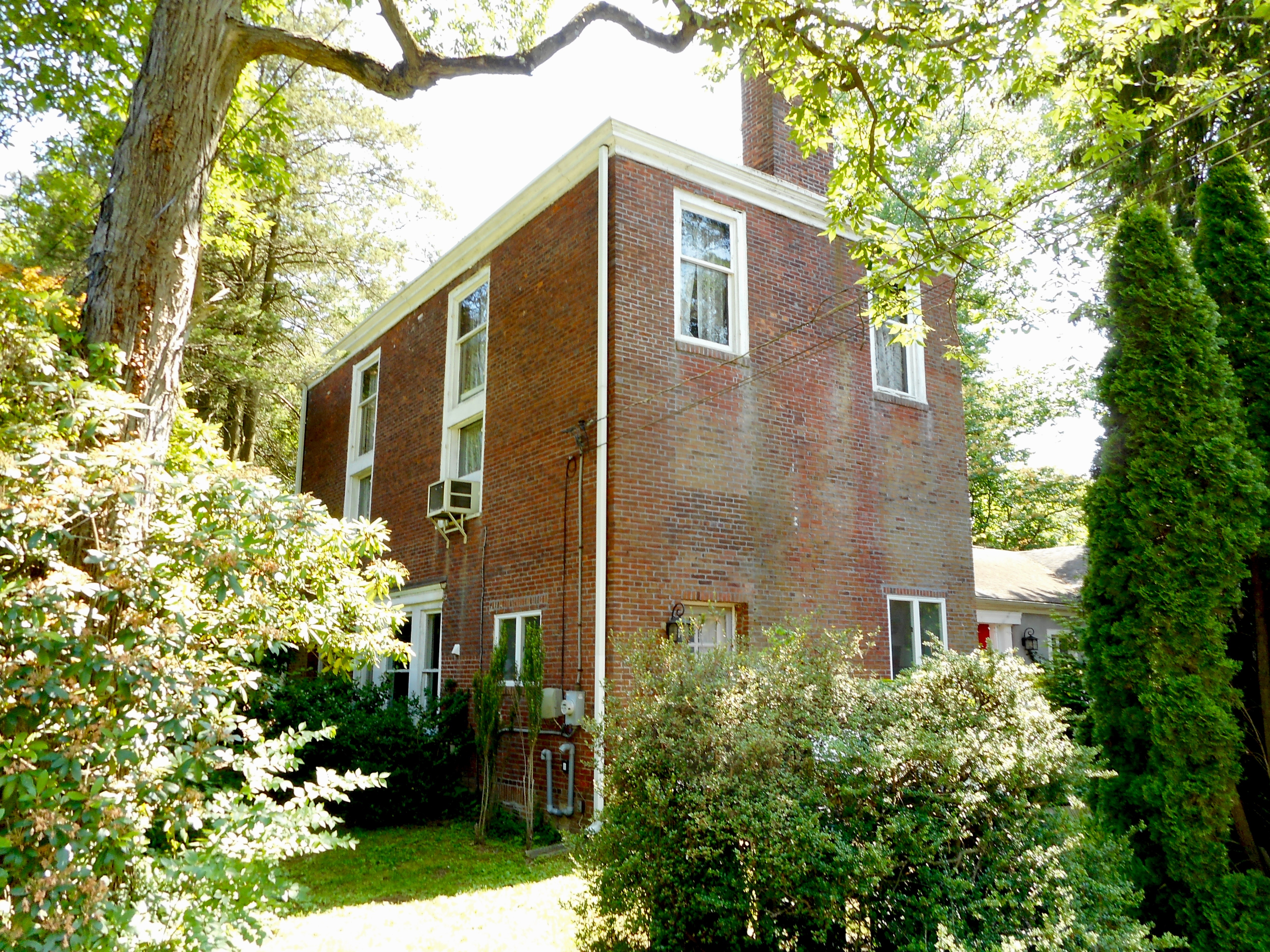
Brick library at "Lindenshade" (1903), in 2017

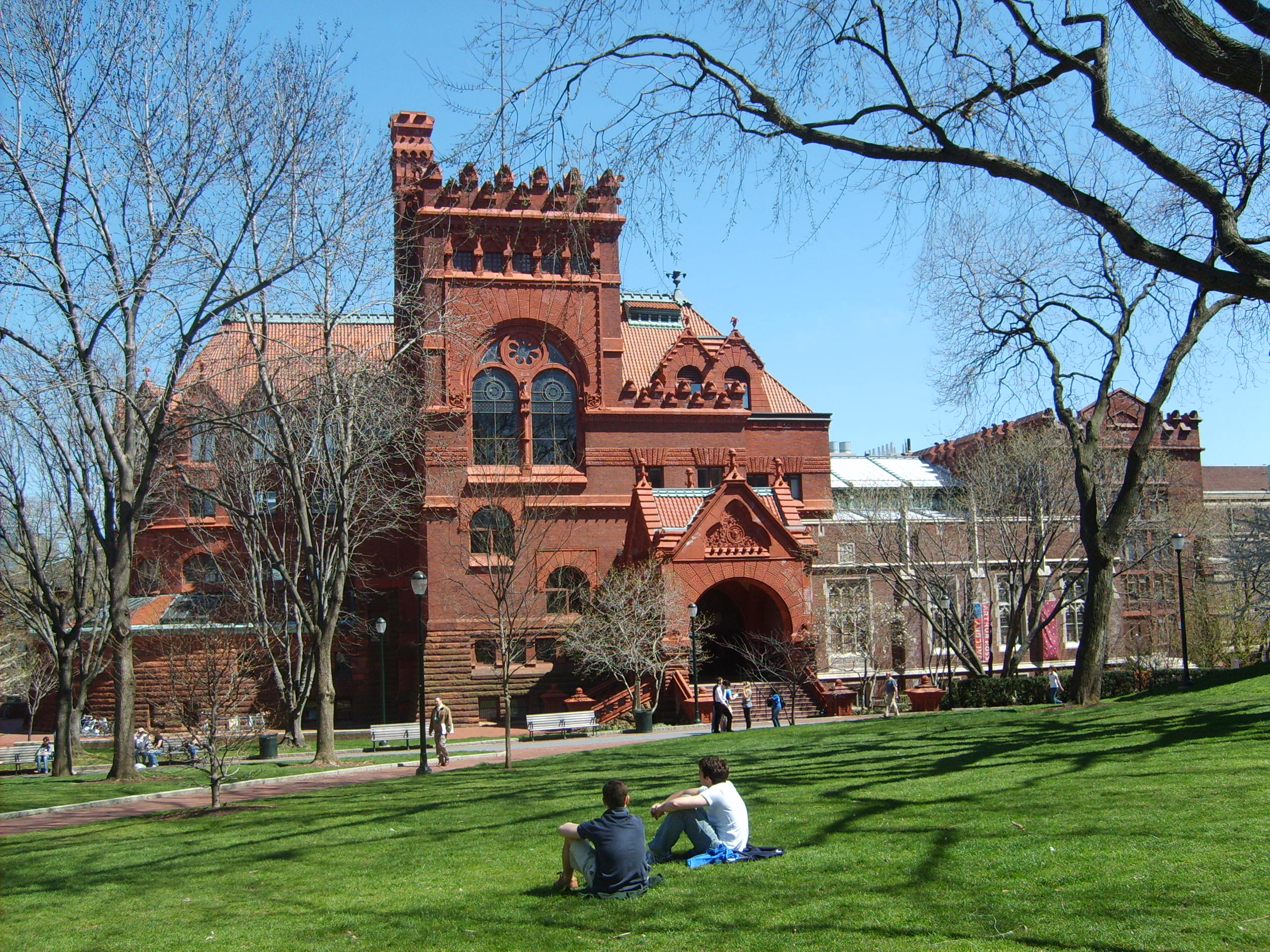
The University of Pennsylvania Library (1891), now the Fisher Fine Arts Library

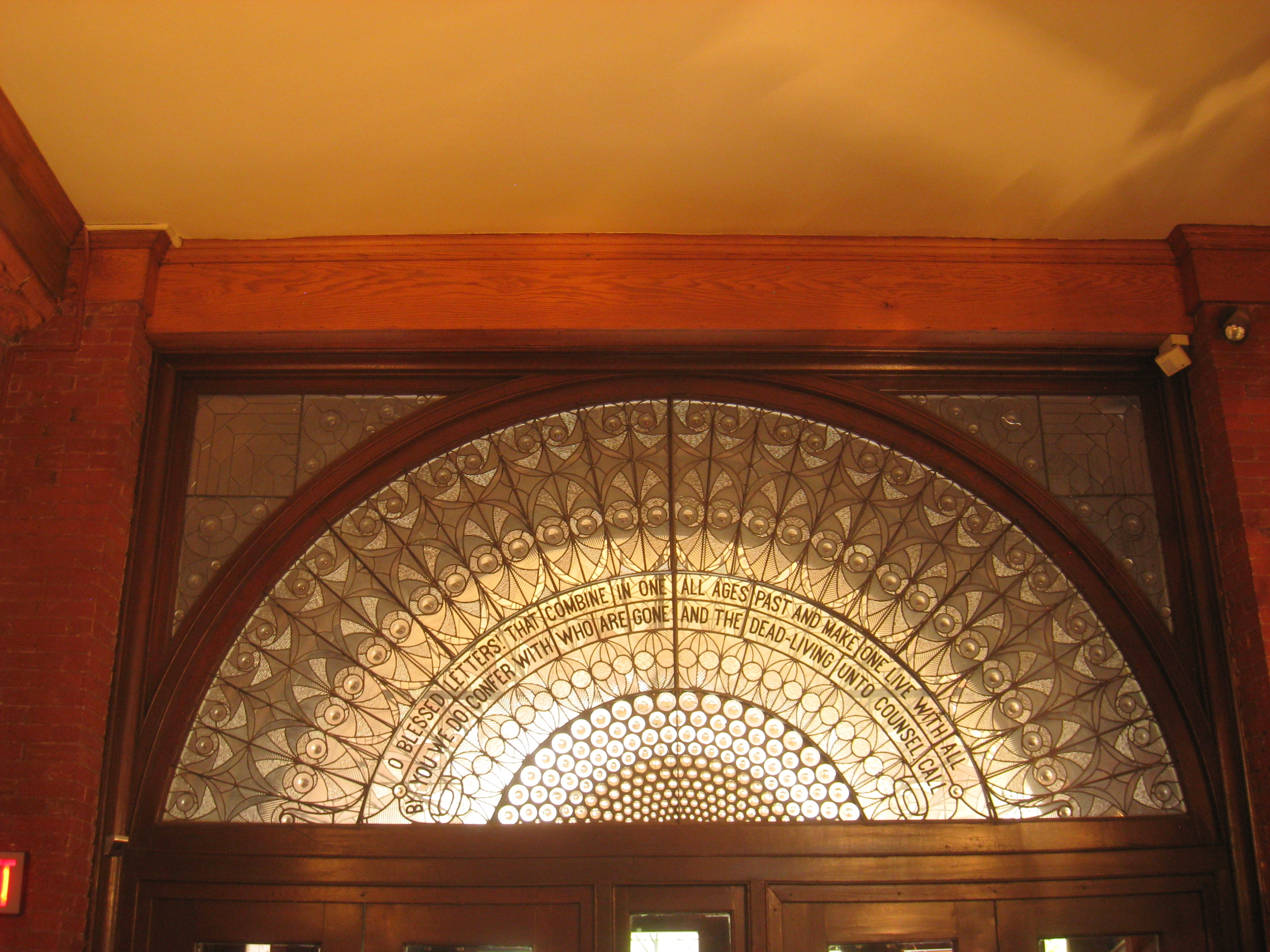
Leaded glass fanlight over the main entrance to the University of Pennsylvania Library

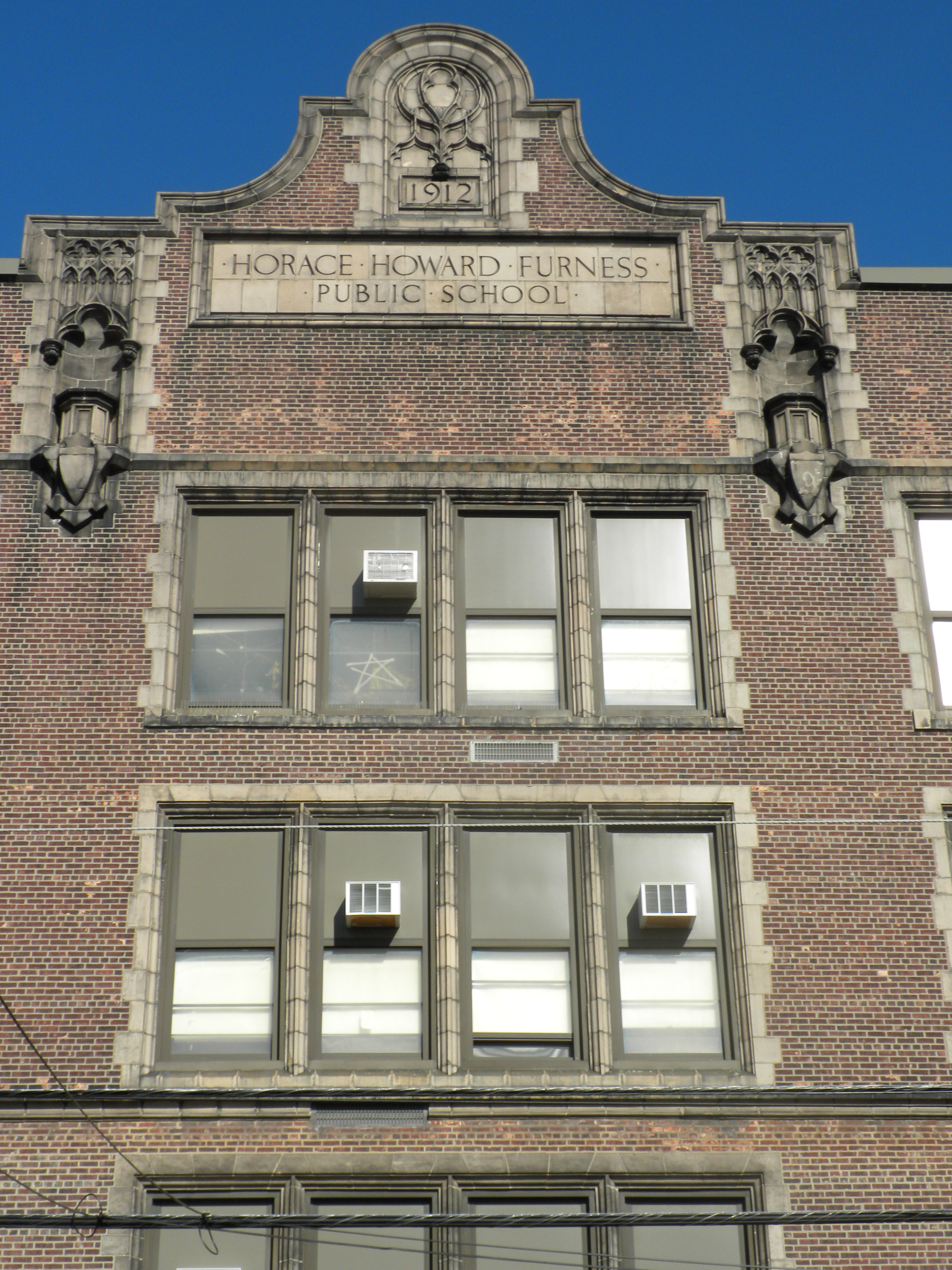
Horace Howard Furness High School in South Philadelphia

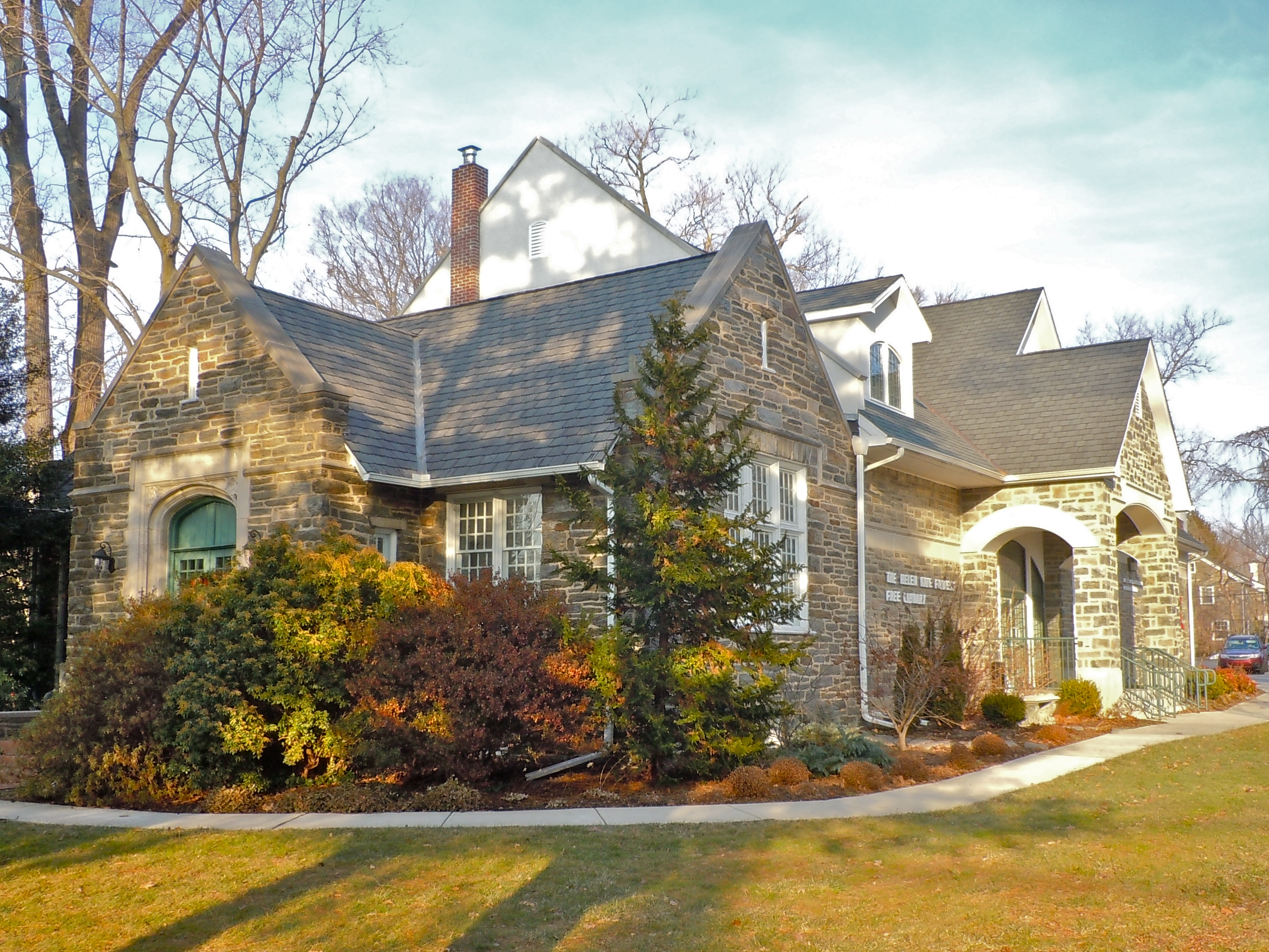
Helen Kate Furness Free Library (1916), Providence Road & Furness Lane, Wallingford, PA

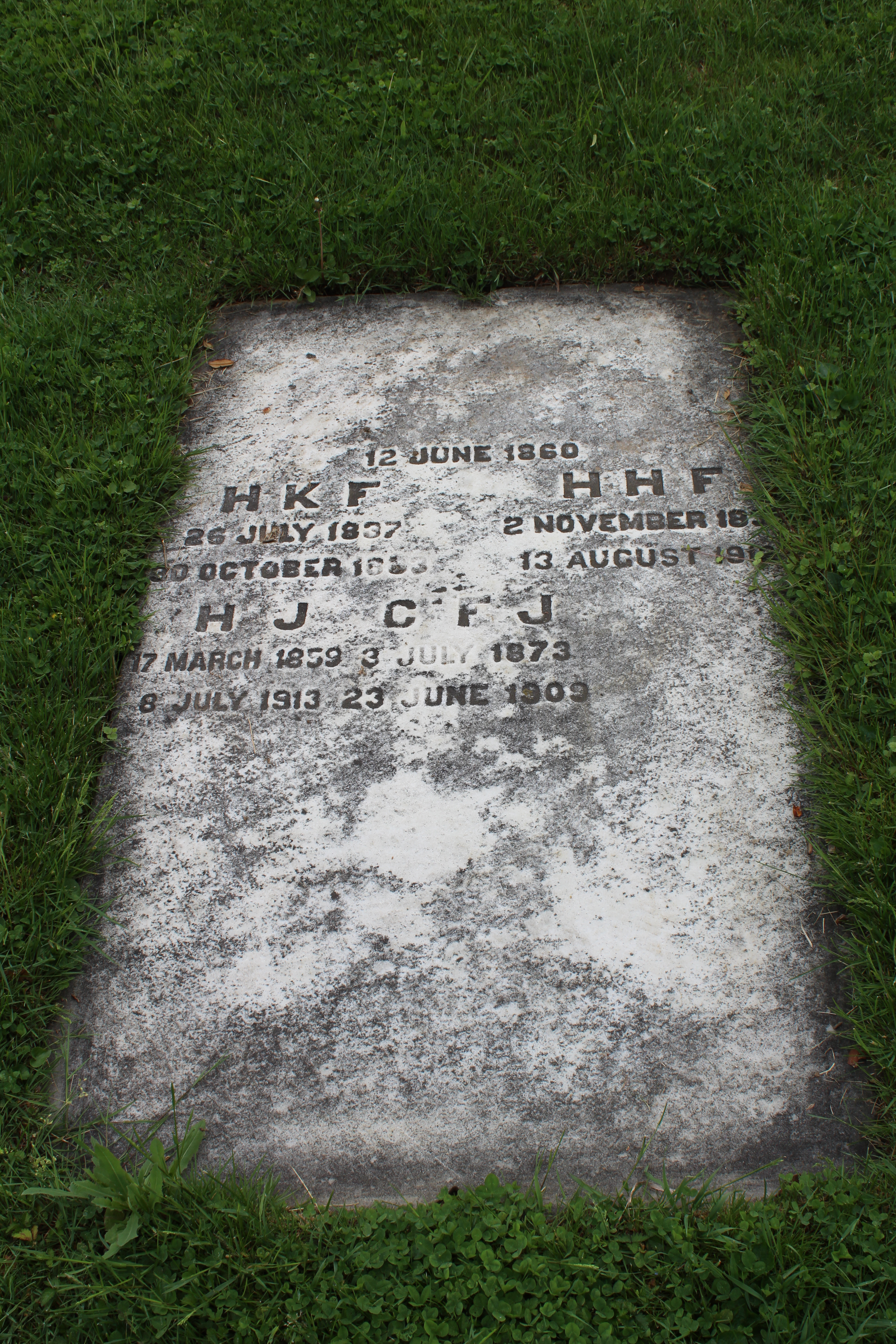
Horace Howard Furness tombstone in Laurel Hill Cemetery
