= The Philadelphia Sound =

Compilation album by Various artists
- Released: October 29, 2002
- Recorded: August 2002
- Genre: Hardcore punk
- Length: 10:40
- Label: Chunksaah

The Philadelphia Sound is a compilation album released by Chunksaah Records in 2002. It features four at the time up-and-coming hardcore punk bands from the Philadelphia, Pennsylvania, area each doing two songs. The bands are The Curse, Go! For The Throat, Knives Out and Paint It Black.

== Track listing ==
No.	Title	Artist	Length
1.	"Goonies Never Say Die"	The Curse	0:36
2.	"Good Job, Kid"	Go! For The Throat	0:47
3.	"Boy Afraid"	Knives Out	1:40
4.	"The Pharmacist"	Paint It Black	1:09
5.	"Old School or Not You're Still a Dick"	The Curse	1:53
6.	"Not Bad for an Older Brother"	Go! For The Throat	2:09
7.	"Anniversary"	Knives Out	1:07
8.	"An Hour And A Half Late For Happy Hour"	Paint It Black	1:19
