= William Henry Furness Jr. =

American painter (1827–1867)

William Henry Furness Jr. (1827 – 1867) was an American portrait painter. He was born in Philadelphia to Annis P. Jenks and William Henry Furness. He began his career as a portrait painter in Philadelphia but soon moved to Boston, where he found greater success. Among others, he painted portraits of Lucretia Mott and Senator Charles Sumner. He studied art in Europe for several years. His father was the minister of the First Unitarian Church of Philadelphia and an ardent abolitionist. His brother Frank Furness was one of Philadelphia's most prominent architects.
