= CVA (album) =

Studio album by Paint It Black
- Released: July 29, 2003
- Recorded: 2003
- Genre: Hardcore punk
- Length: 18:33
- Label: Jade Tree
- Producer: Paint It Black

Paint It Black chronology
Demo (2002)	CVA (2003)	Paradise (2005)

Professional ratings
Review scores
Source	Rating
Allmusic	3/5 stars
Aversion.com	(not rated)
Punk International	(90/100)
Punknews.org	4/5 stars

CVA is the debut full-length album from Philadelphia, PA's Paint It Black. It features much shorter and arguably more aggressive songs than their follow-up album, Paradise, two and a half minutes shorter despite sporting three more tracks. The song "Womb Envy" was featured on the soundtrack of the 2003 skateboarding video game Tony Hawk's Underground.

== Track listing ==
All songs by Paint It Black

1. "Cannibal" – 0:35
2. "Anesthesia" – 0:44
3. "Womb Envy" – 1:28 mp3
4. "Atticus Finch" – 1:39
5. "CVA" – 1:32
6. "Void" – 0:59
7. "The Insider" – 0:43
8. "Cutting Class" – 1:39
9. "Head Hurts Hands on Fire" – 0:38
10. "Bravo, Another Beautiful 'Fuck You' Song!" – 1:19
11. "Watered Down" – 1:20
12. "The Fine Art of Falling Apart" – 1:20
13. "This Song Is Short Because It's Not Political" – 0:26
14. "Less Deicide, More Minor Threat..." – 1:03
15. "Four Simple Steps to Total Life Satisfaction" – 0:59
16. "Short Changed" – 1:27
17. "Why Film the Carnage?" – 0:42

== Personnel ==
- Dan Yemin – vocals, guitar
- Dave Hause – lead guitar
- Andy Nelson – bass guitar, vocals
- David Wagenschutz – drums
- Dean Baltulonis – engineering
- Alan Douches – mastering
- J. Dean – layout

== See also ==
- Cerebrovascular accident (aka CVA) – What the album title and the song of the same name refer to
- Atticus Finch – Fictional character referred to in the song of the same name
- Deicide, Minor Threat Bands referred to in the song "Less Deicide, More Minor Threat..."
