= None More Black =

American band

- Origin: New Jersey, United States
- Genres: Punk rock, melodic hardcore
- Years active: 2000–2006, 2008–2016
- Label: Fat Wreck Chords
- Members: Jason Shevchuk; Paul Delaney; Richard Minino; Colin McGinniss
- Past members: Nick Rotundo; Mike McEvoy; David Wagenschutz; Emmett Menke; Jared Shavelson; Dan Gross
- Website: https://www.facebook.com/NMBMUSIC

None More Black was a New Jersey–based punk rock band on Fat Wreck Chords, formed by lead singer/guitarist Jason Shevchuk after the demise of his previous band, Philadelphia's Kid Dynamite. Shevchuk left Kid Dynamite so that he could finish film school, and "to sort some things out." While at school, Shevchuk had written some songs and would play them with his roommate Dan Gross, who had a drum machine. By 2000, they had a second guitarist and a real drummer. That lineup soon fell apart, but by 2001 Shevchuk and Gross had recruited Shevchuk's brother Jeff Shevchuk, along with a new drummer. After recording a 7" for Sub Division Records, that lineup fell apart as well, this time leaving only the two Shevchuks. In 2002 (after a few more lineup changes) a solid lineup was established, featuring Paul from Kill Your Idols on bass. A demo was recorded, circulated, and the band went on to release their first full length on Fat Wreck Chords.

Their name originates from a line in mockumentary movie This Is Spin̈al Tap. Several of the band's song titles are references to jokes from the television show Seinfeld.

In January 2007 the band announced that they were going on a hiatus and that they would play shows every now and again. On May 19, 2008, the band announced on their MySpace page that they will be playing a free reunion show at the Deep Sleep photo gallery in Philadelphia, Pennsylvania, on July 4, 2008. Jason Shevchuk was working on a project called LaGrecia, which has since split. Colin McGinniss and Paul Delaney's outfit Ram & Ox has also called it quits. Jared Shavelson now plays drums in the hardcore band Paint It Black. Paul Delaney also currently fronts black metal/thrash act Black Anvil.

On July 7, 2008, the band officially announced on their Myspace blog that they have decided to re-form and will be recording a new album.

The band has released three full-lengths and two EPs. Their most recent album, titled "Icons", was released on October 26, 2010, by Fat Wreck Chords.

== Band members ==
- Jason Shevchuk
- Paul Delaney
- Richard Minino
- Colin McGinniss

== Former band members ==
- Nick Rotundo – drums
- Mike McEvoy – drums
- David Wagenschutz – drums
- Emmett Menke – drums
- Jared Shavelson – drums
- Dan Gross – bass

Nick Remondelli – bass

== Discography ==
=== Full Length Albums ===
- File Under Black (Fat, 2003) – LP
- This Is Satire (Fat, 2006) – LP
- Icons (Fat, 2010) – LP

=== Demos ===
- None More Black (Demo) – 2002

=== Singles and EPs ===
- Seven Inch (Sub-Division, 2001) – 7"
- Loud About Loathing (Sabot, 2004) – EP

=== Compilations ===
- In Honor: A Compilation To Beat Cancer (Vagrant, 2004) – "They Got Milkshakes"
- Rock Against Bush, Vol. 1 (Fat, 2004) – "Nothing To Do When You're Locked In A Vacancy"
- Prisoners Of War: A Benefit For Peter Young (The Saturday Team, 2007) – "Burning Up The Headphones"
- Wrecktrospective (Fat, 2009) – "Slytherin? My Ass!" (demo of "Under My Feet")
- Will Yip:Off The Board (2013) – That Thing That Separates Em

=== Music Videos ===
- "Dinner's for Suckers" (2003)
- "Under My Feet" (2006)
