= Keep Your Heart =

The Loved Ones

Studio album by The Loved Ones
- Released: February 21, 2006
- Recorded: October–November 2005
- Genre: Punk rock
- Length: 34:03
- Label: Fat Wreck Chords
- Producer: Brian McTernan

The Loved Ones chronology
The Loved Ones (EP) (2005)	The Loved Ones (2006)	Build & Burn (2008)

Professional ratings
Review scores
Source	Rating
Allmusic	3.5/5 stars
Rockmidgets	4/5 stars

Keep Your Heart is the debut studio album by American punk rock band The Loved Ones. It was released on February 21, 2006 by Fat Wreck Chords. Among the 13 tracks on the album, one, "100K", originally appeared on their EP, The Loved Ones from the year before and two, "Jane" and "Arsenic" originally appeared on their self-released demo from 2004. Also, "Benson and Hedges" was originally done by The Curse, which was a band Dave Hause was in before The Loved Ones.

An outtake from the album, "Spy Diddley", had been featured on the band's MySpace page and was released on Fat Wreck Chords' X-Mas Bonus digital sampler. The track was later released on their Distractions EP in 2009.

== Track listing ==
All songs by Dave Hause and The Loved Ones.

1. "Suture Self" – 2:37
2. "Breathe In" – 2:32
3. "Jane" – 2:55
4. "Over 50 Club" – 1:13
5. "Please Be Here" – 2:28
6. "Hurry Up and Wait" – 2:28
7. "Sickening" – 3:33
8. "Living Will (Get You Dead)" – 2:06
9. "The Odds" – 2:47
10. "Benson and Hedges" – 2:10
11. "Arsenic" – 2:58
12. "100K" – 2:44
13. "Player Hater Anthem" – 3:32

== Credits ==
- Dave Hause – vocals, guitar
- Michael Cotterman – bass
- Mike Sneeringer – drums
