= William Henry Furness =

American clergyman, theologian and abolitionist

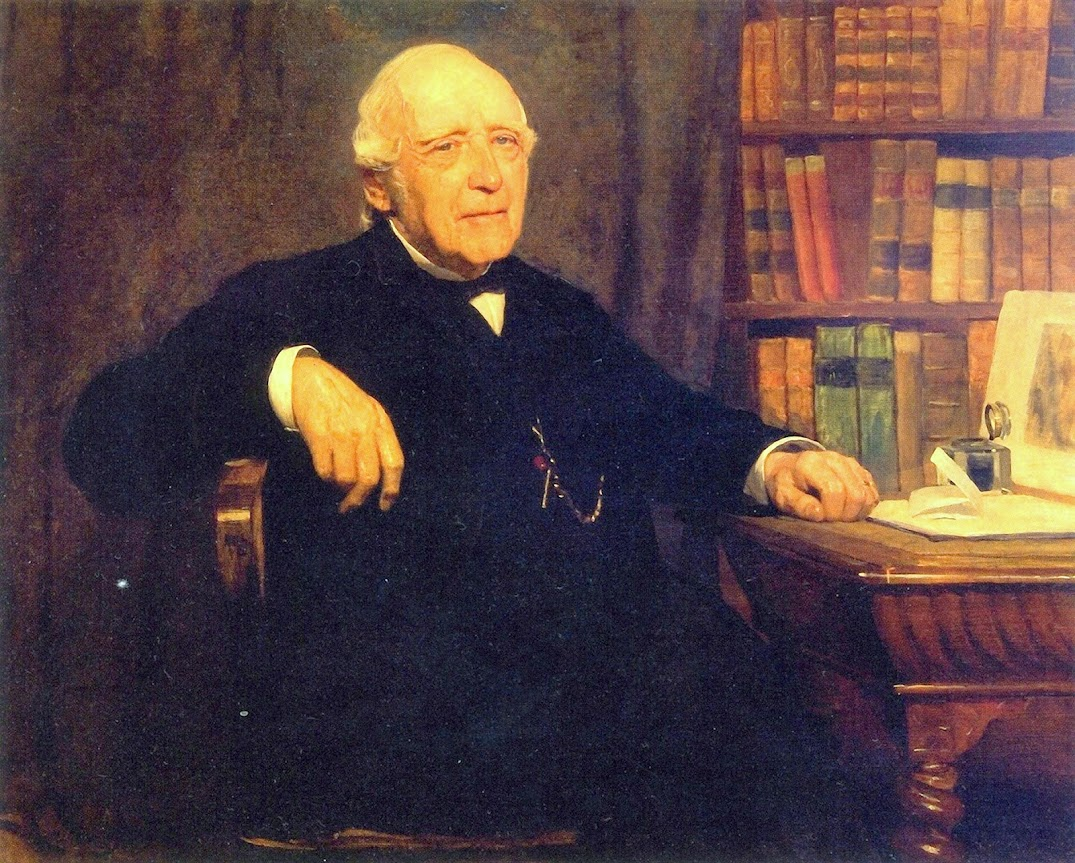
- Reverend Doctor William Henry Furness (1886) by Cecilia Beaux
- Born: April 20, 1802; Boston, Massachusetts, U.S.
- Died: January 30, 1896 (aged 93)
- Resting place: Laurel Hill Cemetery, Philadelphia, Pennsylvania, U.S.
- Children: William Henry Furness Jr. Horace Howard Furness; Frank Furness; Annis Lee Furness Wister
- Relatives: William Henry Furness III (grandson)

William Henry Furness (April 20, 1802 – January 30, 1896) was an American clergyman, theologian, Transcendentalist, abolitionist, and reformer.

== Biography ==
Furness was born in Boston, where he attended the Boston Latin School and developed a lifelong friendship with schoolmate Ralph Waldo Emerson. He graduated from the Harvard Divinity School in 1823. He preached in Watertown and Boston, Massachusetts and in Baltimore, Maryland in early 1823. At the age of 22 he became the minister of the First Unitarian Church of Philadelphia, which had operated without a minister for 29 years. He served there from 1825 until his retirement in 1875. The congregation grew substantially during his ministry, moving to a larger building in 1828 and an even larger building in 1886, which was designed by his son Frank Furness.

Furness was an ardent abolitionist whose attacks on the Fugitive Slave Act led to a discussion at a cabinet meeting of President James Buchanan about the possibility of indicting him for treason. He was a prominent speaker at the Martyr Day vigil in Philadelphia in 1859, which marked the execution of John Brown, who had attempted to spark a slave uprising in the South. After abolitionist Senator Charles Sumner was severely beaten on the floor of the Senate by Congressman Preston Brooks of South Carolina, he stayed at the Furness home during part of his convalescence.

In 1840, he was elected to the American Philosophical Society.

Furness was a student of the life of Jesus, about whom he published several books. He asserted that the miracles attributed to Jesus in the Christian Bible were natural events with rational explanations. He rejected traditional beliefs about Jesus' miraculous birth, saying, "these stories may have been pure fictions ... [or] they were exaggerations of certain simple and very natural incidents, magnified by wonder." He was a hymnwriter and published numerous popular hymns.

Furness promoted outreach to the Jewish community in Philadelphia. His son Frank Furness was the architect for the new building for Congregation Rodeph Shalom.

He married Annis P. Jenks of Salem, Massachusetts in 1825. They had four children: William Henry Furness, Jr., a portrait painter; Horace Howard Furness, a Shakespeare scholar; Frank Furness, one of Philadelphia's most prominent architects; and Annis Lee Furness Wister, an author and translator.

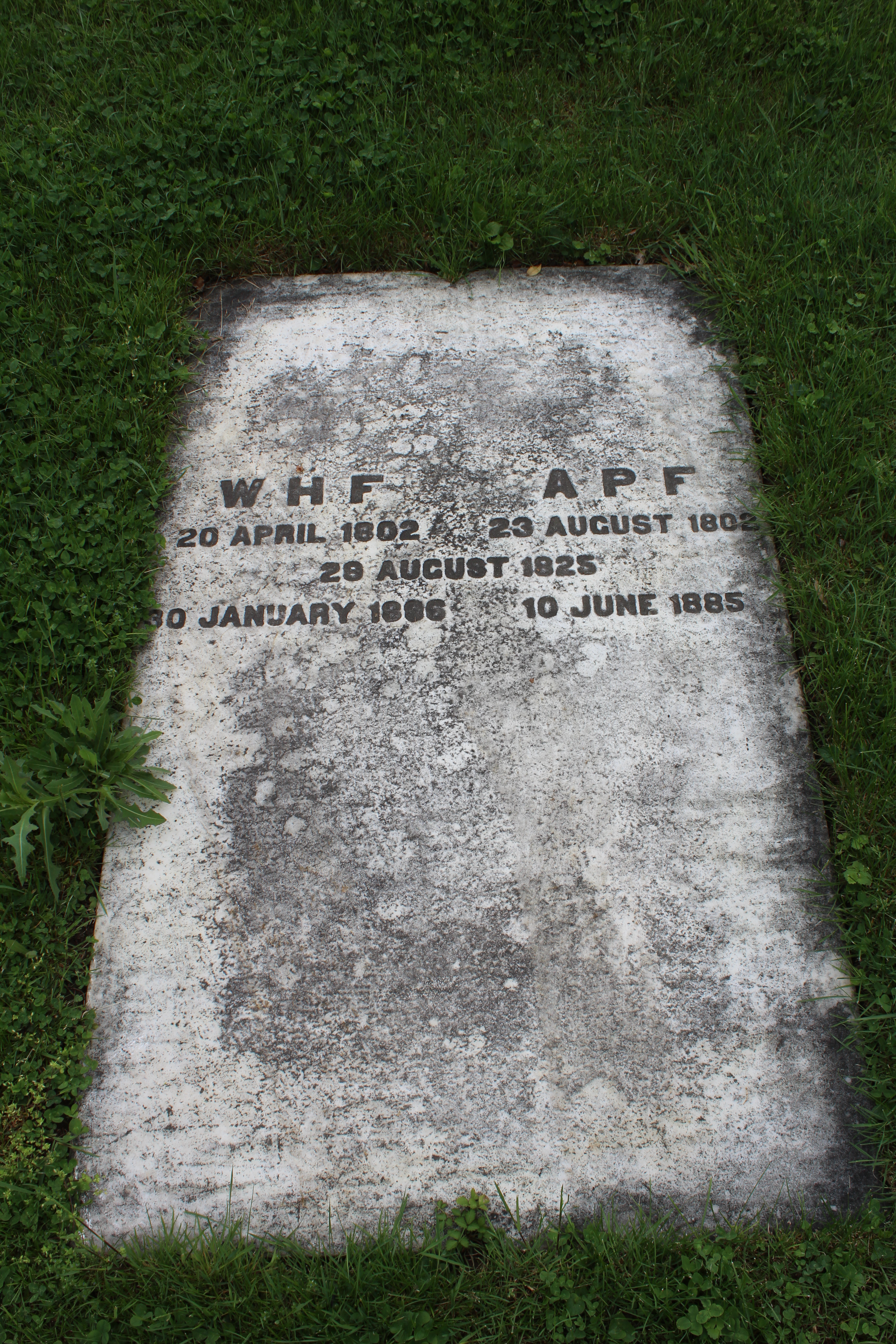
William Henry Furness grave at Laurel Hill Cemetery

He died on January 30, 1896, and was interred at Laurel Hill Cemetery in Philadelphia.

== Selected works ==
- Notes on the Four Gospels (1836)
- The Unconscious Truth of the Gospels
- Jesus and His Biographers (1838)
- Domestic Worship, James Kay, Jun. & Brother, Philadelphia (1840)
- Schiller's Song of the Bell, a New Translation by W.H. Furness (1851)
- The History of Jesus (1853)
- Thoughts on the Life and Character of Jesus of Nazareth (1859)
- The Blessings of Abolition (1860)
- The Veil Partly Lifted (1864)
- The Voice in Speaking, J.B. Lippincott, Philadelphia (1875)
- The Power of Spirit Manifest in Jesus of Nazareth, J.B. Lippincott, Philadelphia (1877)
- Jesus, the Heart of Christianity (1882)
- The Story of the Resurrection of Christ Told Once More (1885)
- Verses, Translations and Hymns (1886)
- The Life of Seth Conkling, Philadelphia (1892)
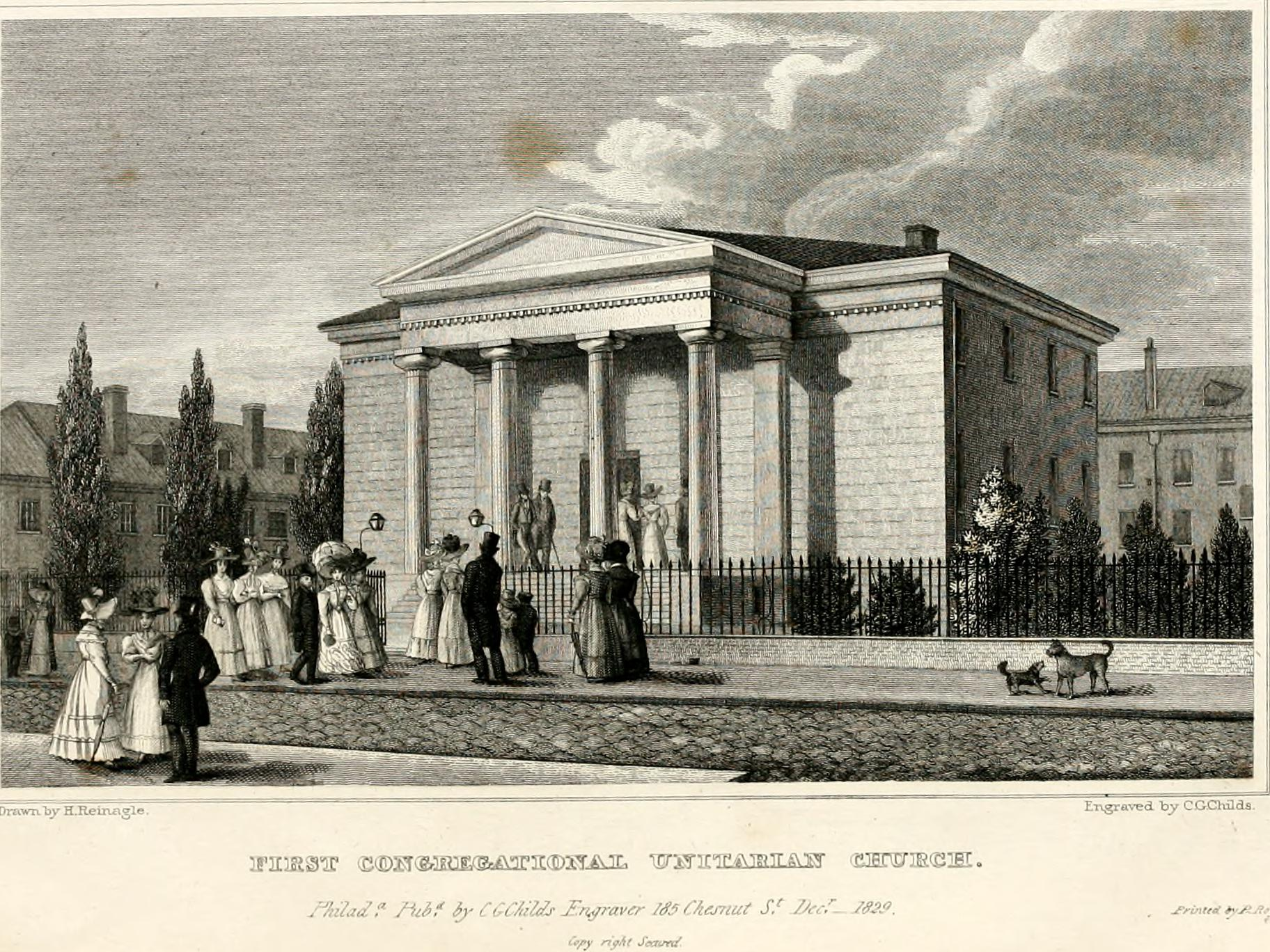
2nd building: First Unitarian Church of Philadelphia

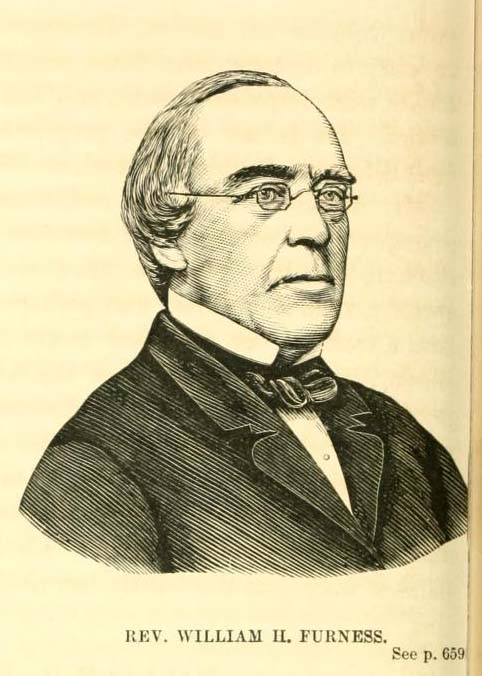
Rev. William H. Furness, from William Still, The Underground Railroad (1872).

3rd building: First Unitarian Church of Philadelphia (1885–86).

== Sources ==
Geffen, Elizabeth M. "William Henry Furness Philadelphia Antislavery Preacher". The Pennsylvania Magazine of History and Biography. University of Pennsylvania.
