= The Loved Ones (EP) =

EP by The Loved Ones
- Released: February 22, 2005
- Recorded: September 2004
- Genre: Street punk
- Length: 15:45
- Label: Jade Tree
- Producer: Brian McTernan

The Loved Ones chronology
The Loved Ones (2005)	Keep Your Heart (2006)

Professional ratings
Review scores
Source	Rating
Allmusic	3/5 stars

The Loved Ones is an EP by the American punk rock band The Loved Ones. It was released on February 22, 2005, by Jade Tree Records, who had previously released albums by Trial by Fire and Kid Dynamite, bands the members of The Loved Ones formerly played in.

The EP was the band's first release through a label, as they previously only self-released a four-song demo. Two of the songs on this EP, "Chicken" and "Candy Cane", were also on that demo. The band followed this with their debut album, Keep Your Heart, which was released just over a year later. That album featured "100K" which originally appeared on this EP.

== Track listing ==
All songs by Dave Hause unless otherwise noted.

1. "100K" – 2:54
2. "Chicken" (Hause, Sneeringer) – 2:50
3. "Massive" – 3:54
4. "Drastic" – 2:51
5. "Candy Cane" (Hause, Sneeringer) – 3:15

== Credits ==
- Dave Hause – vocals, guitar
- Michael Cotterman – bass
- Mike Sneeringer – drums
