= The Loved Ones (American band) =

American punk rock band

- Origin: Philadelphia, Pennsylvania, U.S.
- Genres: Punk rock; pop-punk
- Years active: 2003–present
- Labels: Jade Tree, Fat Wreck Chords
- Members: Dave Hause; Mike Sneeringer; David Walsh; Chris Gonzalez; Michael Cotterman

The Loved Ones are an American punk rock band from Philadelphia, Pennsylvania. Founded in late 2003, the band consists of Dave Hause (lead vocals, guitar), David Walsh (guitar), Chris Gonzalez (bass/guitar), Michael Cotterman (bass) and Mike Sneeringer (drums). They are presently signed to Fat Wreck Chords.

The band never officially disbanded. But in addition to members doing other projects, the band had little activity from 2010 through 2016, when they went on a ten-year anniversary tour.

== History ==
The band was formed in late 2003 by Dave Hause, whose band The Curse had just broken up although he was still in Paint It Black. He was joined by Michael "Spider" Cotterman, formerly the bassist for Kid Dynamite who Hause used to roadie for, and Michael Sneeringer, drummer from Trial by Fire. By July 2004, Hause left Paint It Black to focus on The Loved Ones. The band's first release was a self-released four-song demo in 2004. The following year, they released an EP, The Loved Ones, on Jade Tree Records.

While Hause was working as a roadie for The Bouncing Souls, the band was given the opportunity to do a tour with The Bouncing Souls, and would also tour with NOFX. Impressed by the band, NOFX frontman Fat Mike signed them to his label Fat Wreck Chords. Fat Wreck released the band's debut album Keep Your Heart in 2006. Their song "100K" was used in the 2006 game Saints Row.

In December 2006, a posting on the band's MySpace page announced that Cotterman had left the band. He was replaced by Chris Gonzalez and they also added second guitarist David Walsh. They were both formerly members of The Explosion, who had announced their split up near the time Cotterman left.

The band released their second full-length album Build & Burn on February 5, 2008. The album was produced by Pete Steinkopf and Bryan Kienlen of the Bouncing Souls.

On February 3, 2009, the band released Distractions, their third release for Fat Wreck Chords. The EP consists of three original songs, two of which ('Distracted' and 'Last Call') were brand new and the other ('Spy Diddley') was originally released as part of the Fat Wreck Chords X-Mas Bonus in 2006. The final three tracks of the EP were cover versions of Bruce Springsteen's 'Johnny 99', 'Lovers Town Revisited' by Billy Bragg and Joe Strummer's 'Coma Girl'.

In the summer of 2010, The Loved Ones embarked on their first tour of Australia. Gonzalez could not attend, so original bassist Cotterman rejoined the band for the tour.

Dave Hause released his first solo record entitled Resolutions on January 24, 2011, through Paper + Plastick, and has since released several solo albums and EPs.

Although the band has not released any new music since 2009, they still occasionally go on tour. For example, the band went on a three-date "world tour" in 2015, playing Asbury Park, NJ and Philadelphia, PA in April and Groezrock in Belgium in May. These shows featured all five members, with Cotterman on bass, and Gonzalez, Walsh, and Hause all on guitar. Then, in 2016, the band went on tour to play shows celebrating the tenth anniversary of their debut album Keep Your Heart (2006, Fat Wreck). During this tour, a giant wooden stick became part of frontman Dave Hause's ensemble.

On January 1, 2024, the band announced on their social media they "are looking forward to playing together in 2024, for the first time in 8 years". They co-headlined the Sing Us Home festival in their hometown Philadelphia on May 3 through 5.

== Musical style and composition ==
The Loved Ones have been described musically as punk rock and the pop-punk punk subgenre.

== Members ==
- Dave Hause – vocals/guitar/stick (2003–present)
- Mike Sneeringer – drums (2003–present)
- Michael "Spider" Cotterman – bass/vocals (2003–2006, 2010, 2015–present)
- Chris Gonzalez – bass/vocals (2006–2015), guitar/vocals (2015–present)
- David Walsh – guitar/vocals (2006–present)

== Discography ==
=== Albums ===
- Keep Your Heart (2006, Fat Wreck)
- Build & Burn (2008, Fat Wreck)

=== EPs ===
- Demo (2004, self-released)
- Demo 2 (2004 or 2005, self-released)
- The Loved Ones (2005, Jade Tree)
- Distractions (2009, Fat Wreck)

=== Music videos ===
- 100K (2005)
- Jane (2006)
- The Bridge (2008)
