= Jared Shavelson =

American drummer

Jared Shavelson is an American drummer from Cherry Hill, New Jersey. He attended SUNY where he studied jazz. After two years at Music Conservatory he joined The Hope Conspiracy. In 2006 he joined None More Black and played with Paint It Black. He moved to Los Angeles where he played Digital Daggers and played on the album Anthems by Pure Love. He is currently a member BoySetsFire, and has recently toured as the drummer for Meg Myers, Seal, and The Bronx in 2018 and 2019.

== Discography ==
Music
Year	Title	Band	Label
2002	Get Right	Man Without Plan	Creep Records
2006	Death Knows Your Name	The Hope Conspiracy	Deathwish Records
2006	This Is Satire	None More Black	Fat Wreck Chords
2008	New Lexicon	Paint It Black	Jade Tree
2013	Anthems	Pure Love	Mercury Records
