= First Unitarian Church of Philadelphia =

Historic church in Pennsylvania, United States

- First Unitarian Church
- U.S. National Register of Historic Places
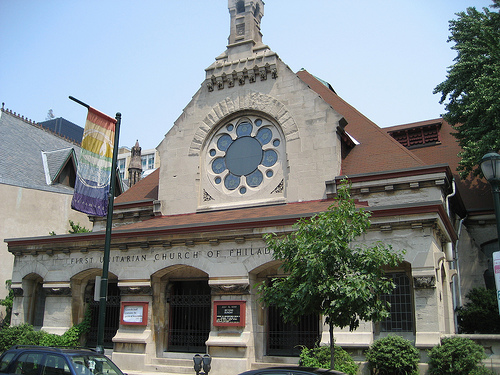

- Location within Philadelphia Location within Pennsylvania Location within the United States
- Location: 2125 Chestnut Street; Philadelphia, Pennsylvania
- Coordinates: 39.952671°N 75.176365°W
- Built: 1886
- Architect: Frank Furness
- Architectural style: Gothic
- NRHP reference No.: 71000724
- Added to NRHP: May 27, 1971

The First Unitarian Church of Philadelphia is a Unitarian Universalist congregation located at 2125 Chestnut Street in Philadelphia, Pennsylvania. As a regional Community Center it sponsors cultural, educational, civic, wellness and spiritual activities.

On June 12, 1796, twenty of Philadelphia's intellectual leaders formed the First Unitarian Society of Philadelphia, becoming the first continuously functioning church in the country to name itself "Unitarian". The founders were directed and encouraged by the Unitarian minister Joseph Priestley, and its first settled minister was the Rev. Dr. William Henry Furness.

== William Henry Furness ==
The small but growing congregation was lay-led until 1825, when Rev. Dr. William Henry Furness was persuaded to serve as the first minister at the age of 22. Starting in the 1830s, Furness became one of the few abolitionist ministers in the city, known for his anti-slave sermons and Underground Railroad activities. His speeches were so impassioned that both he and the congregation feared reprisals from Southern sympathizers, so several members of the church quietly armed themselves and watched over the pulpit on Sundays. His attacks on the Fugitive Slave Law drew discussion in one of President Buchanan's cabinet meetings of indicting the minister for treason. Furness served as minister for 50 years, and remained involved in the church until his death in 1898.

== Architecture ==
=== First building (1813–1828) ===
The Octagon Building (begun March 1812, dedicated February 14, 1813): The first church building, located at the northeast corner of 10th & Locust, was designed by Robert Mills, thought to be the first architect born and trained in the United States. Its octagonal shape was unusual for Philadelphia, however it followed the pattern of Unitarian churches in England such as the Octagon Chapel, Norwich (1756, Thomas Ivory) and Octagon Chapel, Liverpool (1763). These typically used an octagonal design in a symbolic move away from the traditional cross-shaped floor plans of orthodox Christian churches. The construction cost was approximately $25,000 and the finished church seated 300 people.

=== Second building (1828–1885) ===
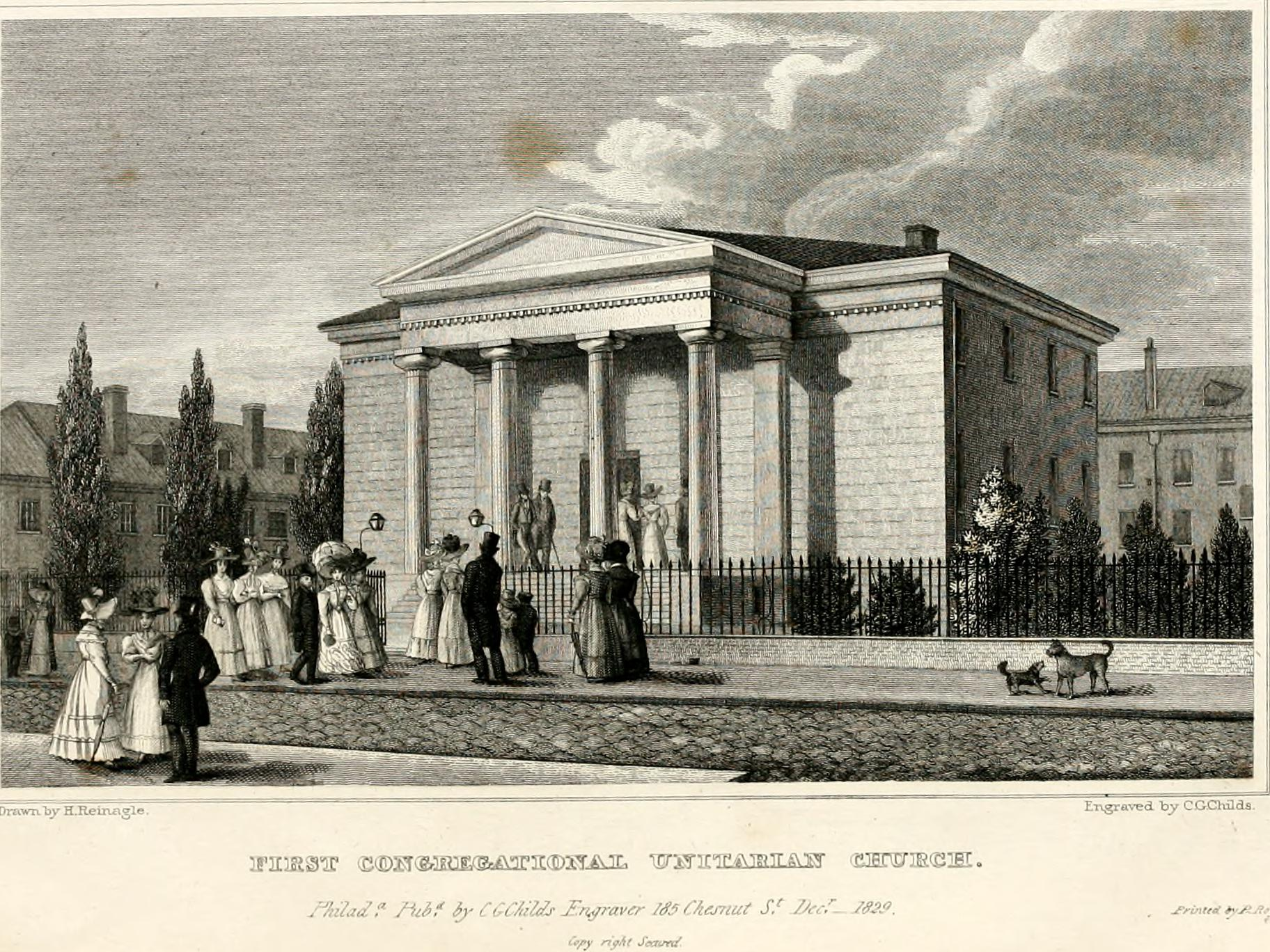
Second building

Desiring a larger and more elegant edifice to reflect the growth of the congregation, church members voted to construct a second building. Using the same location (10th & Locust), the cornerstone of the "Doric Building" was laid on March 24, 1828. Greek Revival architecture was then very popular. Designed by William Strickland, this building was described in contemporary books as one of the most outstanding churches in the city. Dedicated on November 5, 1828, this remained the congregation's worship space until moving to the present site at 2125 Chestnut Street in 1885.

=== Third building (1885–present) ===
Third building. Note the tower/porte cochere in this 1886 drawing.

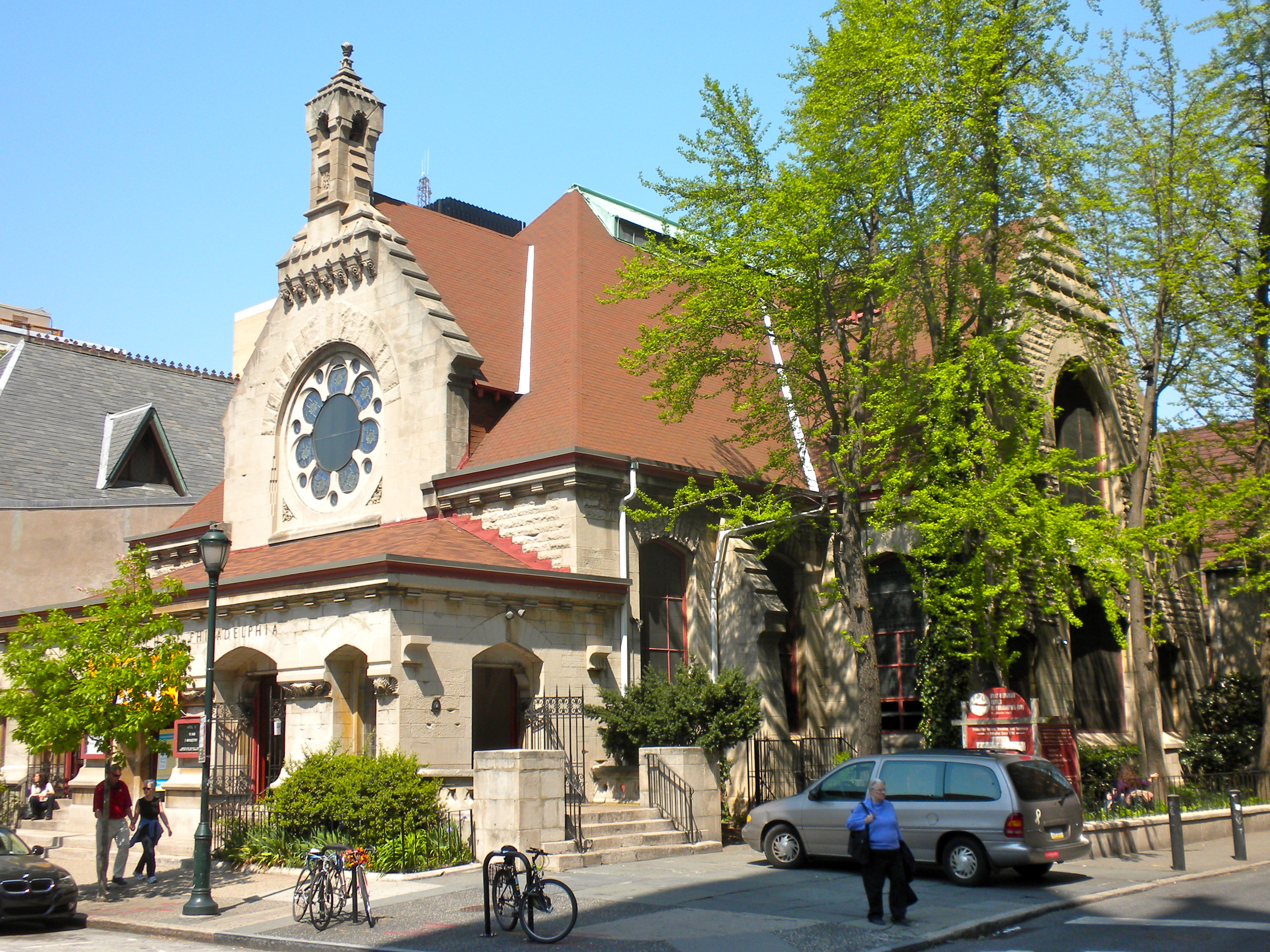
Similar view in 2010.

Frank Furness, the architect of The Pennsylvania Academy of the Fine Arts and son of the Church's first minister, designed the current church building. Begun in 1883, and dedicated in 1885, it was completed in 1886. The tall pyramidal tower/porte cochere at the church's southeast corner was removed in the early 20th century.

The sanctuary features a hammer-beam ceiling, painted rust red and stenciled with gold-leaf daffodils, which is complemented by blue walls. The church's stained glass windows are by Louis Tiffany & Co. and John La Farge. Later additions include a concert-grade Casavant pipe organ with 3 manuals and 50 ranks. In addition to the sanctuary, the building also contains a basement level housing Griffin Hall, which includes a stage and commercial-size kitchen. The rear portion of the building contains the Parish Room for meetings, and a smaller chapel. The mezzanine and 3rd floors contain a variety of offices, meeting rooms, storage, and daycare facilities.

== Notable members ==
Frances Ellen Watkins Harper, the first woman of African descent to have her writings published in the United States, was a member of First Church from 1870 until her death in 1911. She is best known for her fiction and poetry, but was also a political activist and lecturer who promoted, civil rights, temperance, and women's rights.

Laura Matilda Towne, was one of the first Northern women to go south to work with freed slaves. Towne opened the Penn School, the first school for freedmen, while the Civil War was raging. Unlike most of those who went south at the time, Laura Towne made a life for herself on St. Helena Island, South Carolina, and ran the Penn School until her death in 1901.

Kevin Bacon was raised at the First Unitarian Church of Philadelphia and had his first acting debut in a holiday pageant.

== Notable events ==
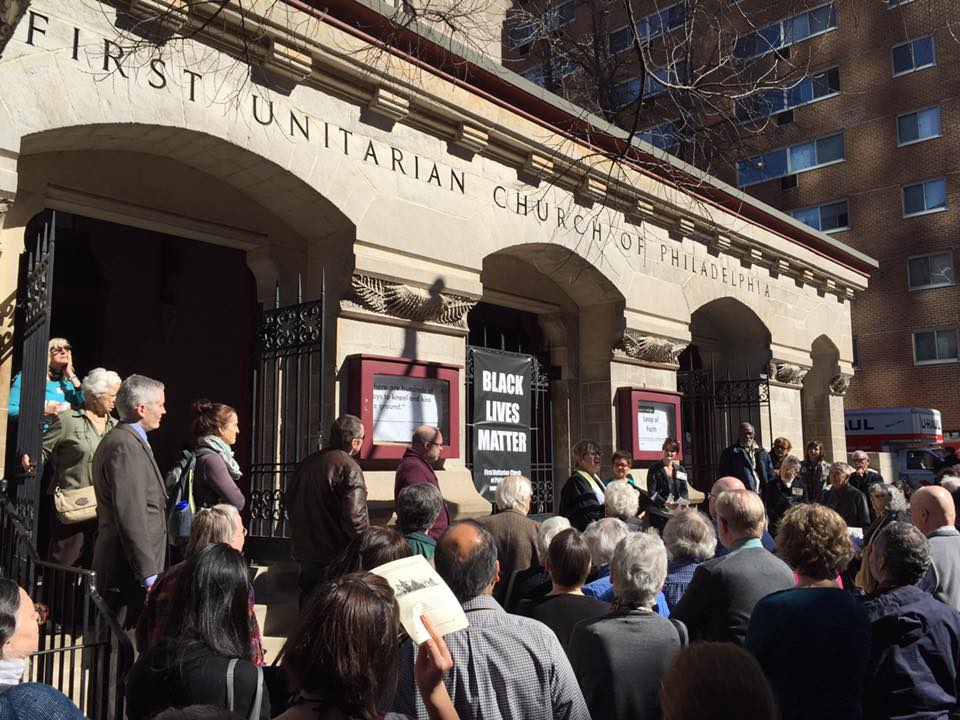
Led by interim minister Rev. Dr. Susan V. Rak, the First Unitarian Church of Philadelphia dedicates its new Black Lives Matter banner on February 28, 2016. Photograph by Michael Johnson.

The day after John Brown was executed, his body came to Philadelphia for a private vigil attended by William Henry Furness, then was taken to North Elba, New York, and buried. National Archivist, V. Chapman-Smith writes, "A supporter of John Brown, who reached out to provide comfort and aid to Brown's wife, Furness was a prominent speaker at the Philadelphia "Martyr Day" (December 2, 1859) vigil at National Hall. Furness' zeal against the 1850 Fugitive Slave Law captured attention at one of President Buchanan's cabinet meetings, where consideration was given to indicting Furness for treason!"

When Martin Luther King Jr. was a seminary student in nearby Chester, Pennsylvania, he attended a lecture by Dr. Mordecai Johnson about how Mohandas K. Gandhi integrated Henry David Thoreau's theory of non-violent civil disobedience that inspired King's non-violent protests for civil rights. This lecture was reputed to have taken place at the First Unitarian Church in Philadelphia, but recent information uncovered by historian Patrick Duff in 2020 proved that this church was in fact the site of the lecture. The lecture took place on November 19th of 1950 at 3:45 pm. King was so moved by the speech that he followed Dr. Johnson back to the Fellowship House where they spoke into the night.

In April 2006, the church officially became a "Welcoming Congregation" to the bisexual, transgender, lesbian, and gay community. In 2007, Nathan C. Walker became its first openly gay minister.

In July 2010, executives from Monsanto visited the church to discuss the adoption of a code of ethics for the field of biotechnology, a sort of Hippocratic oath, akin to a doctor's pledge to "do no harm".

In February 2016, as part of a nationwide effort among UU congregations, the congregation unanimously adopted the following statement of support for the Black Lives Matter movement:

In line with our commitment to affirming the inherent worth and dignity of all people, we, the First Unitarian Church of Philadelphia, declare that black lives matter. We support the Black Lives Matter movement and pledge our congregation's dedication to participating in anti-racist, anti-oppression work within our own community; to acknowledging our denomination's and our congregation's checkered racial history; and to serving as allies, witnesses, and partners in our country's continued struggle for racial justice and equity.

A corresponding banner was installed on the church porch, facing Chestnut Street.

== Settled ministers ==
Joseph Priestley	1796–1804
William Christie	1807
William Henry Furness	1825–1875
Joseph May	1876–1901
James Ecob	1901–1907
Charles St. John	1908–1916
Frederick Robertson Griffin	1917–1947
Harry Barron Scholefield	1947–1957
Anders Lunde	1958–1962
Angus Cameron	1963–1967
Victor H. Carpenter	1968–1976
Rev. Beth Ide, Assistant Minister	1975
Brian Sandor Kopke	1977–1984
Ken Collier	1986–1991
Benjamin P. Maucere	1992–2005
Holly Horn	1995–2005
Nathan C. Walker	2007–2014
Abbey Tennis	2016–Present

== Culture and civic life ==
First Unitarian is a regional community center that provides meeting space on a non-discriminatory basis for many different groups and activities: yoga and aerobics classes, meditation, Narcotics Anonymous meetings, forums by the Americans for Democratic Action and Common Cause, Black Women's Art Festival, Islamic Relief Day of Dignity, Philadelphia Fringe Festival events, and citywide vigils honoring victims of violence in Philadelphia.

First Unitarian is home to a concert-grade Casavant pipe organ. With its Center City location, First Church is commonly used as an entertainment venue for all ages: Music-for-Children classes, classical music concerts by Dolce Suono, as well as indie, alternative, and punk rock concerts.

In November 2007, Rolling Stone magazine featured the church as one of the top alternative rock venues thanks to the success of the events organized by R5 Productions in the basement, chapel, and sanctuary. Since the mid-90s, the church's basement, Griffin Hall, known colloquially as "The Church" or simply "First Unitarian" by show goers, has been a popular venue for small-scale independent music concerts in the city. The concerts have featured mostly punk and indie rock artists in the past but have expanded to include other genres as well.

== Children and daycare centers ==
First Church is the longtime home of two daycare centers: the Beacon Center and Little Miracles. Both centers boast long-tenured staff. Members of First Church founded the Beacon Center in the early 1980s to exemplify the values of the church.

First Unitarian also draws parents of young children and youth with religious education programs that promote value-based learning about one's responsibility to one another and to the Earth. The Neighboring Faiths program teaches teens about the importance of other religious traditions and thereby promotes open-mindedness and respect. Child dedications, conducted with a thornless rose, are a special rite of passage for Unitarian Universalist families.
