= Girin =

Girin may refer to:

- Qilin
- Girin-myeon, a township in South Korea
- Jilin City, historical alternative romanization was Girin.

== See also ==
- Keirin, a form of motor-paced cycle racing
- Kirin (disambiguation)
- Kirin no Tsubasa, a 2012 Japanese film
- Kirino (disambiguation)
- Kylin (disambiguation)
- Qilin (disambiguation)
- Xilin (disambiguation)
- 麒麟 (disambiguation)
