= Venom (Awesome Snakes album) =

2006 album by the Awesome Snakes

Studio album by the Awesome Snakes
- Released: July 17, 2006
- Genre: Punk rock
- Length: 23:51
- Labels: Crustacean Records, Stand Up! Records

The Awesome Snakes chronology
Venom (2006)	Snake Cake (2008)

Venom
Review scores
Source	Rating
Punknews.org	3.5/5 stars
Sliver Magazine	B+
Ultimate Guitar	7.8/10 stars

Venom is a 2006 album by Minneapolis punk rock band Awesome Snakes, a side project of then-Soviettes members Annie "Sparrows" Holoien and Danny Henry.

== History ==
Holoien and Henry began The Awesome Snakes as a way to ease the pressure of the Soviettes' increasing success by making what Henry described as a "jokey" and "free and loose" set of punk songs, spiced with audio samples from Henry's collection of odd self-help and how-to tapes.

The instrumentation is deliberately simple, just Holoien on bass and Henry on drums, with the bass played through a Fender Blues Deville amplifier on high distortion. The lyrics are also highly focused; A.V. Club writer Christopher Bahn noted that the song topics revolve around "two subjects: snakes and/or things that are awesome."

Venom was released July 17, 2006, on Wisconsin record label Crustacean Records. A significant step forward in production from their 2004 self-titled, cassette-only debut, Venom featured fifteen tracks recorded in much higher fidelity by their friend Ross and mastered by Dave Gardener, and features a guest appearance by Twin Cities MC P.O.S.

On October 15, 2021, Venom was re-released on vinyl by Stand Up! Records, with four songs from the band's 2009 digital EP Snake Cake included as bonus tracks.

== Critical reception ==
Venom enjoyed great critical success in the band's home state of Minnesota, being named one of the best albums of 2006 in the Star Tribune's annual Twin Cities Critics Tally and also making the best-of lists for The A.V. Club's Twin Cities edition and Pulse.

Andrea Swensson of City Pages said "they play with a seriousness that sharply contrasts the silly nature of their music." Stephanie Soucheray, writing for Sliver Magazine, said "Venom may be self-referential, vulgar, goofy and weird. But it is never pretentious. The album is the sound of people having fun, and people being honest about their musical intentions." Tim Thompson of Wisconsin's "Local Sounds Magazine" praised Venom's "huge, manic, underground sound ... delivering an almost disembodied psychedelic freak-out in the middle of a garage-punk record."

The album also received critical praise from several national publications, including Alternative Press, which called it "lo-fi, furious, primal garage-rock voodoo"; Maximumrocknroll, which called it "smart-arsed, snotty, arty and funny;" and Punk Planet, which called it "a fuzzed up and confrontationally comedic dose of garage bangers and pogo punk punishers." Punk zine Razorcake praised two early demos, 2006's The Stupid Demo and The Cheap-Ass Cassette Demo, calling them "low-fi garage punk that is poppy yet very psychedelic in a go-go kid way." The publication was less impressed with Venom itself, saying: "Overall, this seems like a joke band that must be really funny for the people who made it, but for the rest of us it's worth listening to maybe once at the most."

Reviewing the 2021 re-release, Roctober Magazine said "This reissue of an early 2000s Midwestern ridiculous riff rock relic proves that nothing is as timeless as lo fi, stripped down, absurdist snake songs."

== In popular culture ==
The song "I Want a Snake" is featured in the Electronic Arts skateboarding video game Skate 2.

== Track listing ==
2006, Crustacean Records
No.	Title	Length
1.	"Venom"	1:55
2.	"I Want a Snake"	1:33
3.	"Shut Up!"	2:16
4.	"Whiskey vs. Police"	0:27
5.	"It Would Be Awesome if We Weren't Here"	1:28
6.	"You Don't Like Snakes, I Don't Like You"	2:18
7.	"Snakes vs. Jerks"	1:11
8.	"These Snakes Get High!"	1:00
9.	"Awesome Snacks"	1:35
10.	"Awesome Party"	2:06
11.	"1950's UFO vs. Snakes"	0:38
12.	"Awesome 6-Pack"	2:11
13.	"You Got Snakes All Up in Your Grill"	1:43
14.	"P.O.S. vs. Awesome Snakes"	1:45
15.	"The Future of the Snake Industry"	1:52
Total length:		23:51

Bonus tracks, 2021 Stand Up! Records reissue, originally released as Snake Cake EP
No.	Title	Length
16.	"Moola"	2:46
17.	"You Got Another Thing Comin'"	2:03
18.	"Birthday Party Sally"	2:28
19.	"Fist Fight"	2:28
