= The Giraffes =

The Giraffes can be one of the following bands:

- The Giraffes (Brooklyn band)
  - The Giraffes (album)
- The Giraffes (Seattle band)

== See also ==
- Giraffe (disambiguation)
