= One-Trick Pony =

A one-trick pony is an animal or person that can only do one thing, like a certain trick or song.

One-Trick Pony may refer to:

== Music ==
- One-Trick Pony (album), a 1980 studio album by Paul Simon, and a song on the album
- "One Trick Pony", a song by deadmau5 featuring SOFI from the 2010 album 4×4=12
- "One Trick Pony", a song by Nelly Furtado featuring Kronos Quartet from the 2003 album Folklore
- "One Trick Pony", a song from the 2008 album Lightbulbs by Fujiya & Miyagi
- "One Trick Pony", a song from the 1999 album This Shit Is Genius by Dillinger Four
- "One Trick Pony", a 2006 single by Joe Brown

== Television ==
- "One Trick Pony", a 2014 episode of TV series BoJack Horseman (season 1)
- "One Trick Pony", a 2007 episode of TV series Heartland

== Other uses ==
- One-Trick Pony (film), a 1980 film starring Paul Simon
- One-Trick Pony (magazine), edited by Louis McKee

== See also ==
- Trick Pony, an American country music band
- "Trick Pony", a song from Charlotte Gainsbourg's album Stage Whisperer
