= Giraffe (disambiguation) =

A giraffe is a large African hoofed mammal.

Giraffe may also refer to:

== Arts and entertainment ==
- Giraffe, a 2019 Danish film starring Norwegian actress Lisa Loven Kongsli
- Giraffe (album), by Echoboy
- Giraffe (novel), by J. M. Ledgard
- Giraffe, a progressive rock band led by Kevin Gilbert
- Meschugge or The Giraffe, a 1998 German thriller film by Dani Despecito

== Military ==
- Giraffe radar, a family of radar-based air defense and surveillance systems
- USS Giraffe, a US Navy ship in service between 1943 and 1946

== Other uses ==
- Giraffe (chess), a fairy chess piece
- Giraffe constellation or Camelopardalis, a group of stars
- Giraffe World Kitchen, a UK restaurant and cafe chain

== See also ==
- The Giraffes (disambiguation)
- Giraffe Heroes Project, an international non-profit organisation
- 麒麟 (disambiguation) (English: qilin or giraffe)
