= France Has the Bomb =

Alternative rock band

- Origin: Minneapolis, Minnesota, United States
- Genres: Alternative rock
- Years active: 2007–present
- Labels: Dusty Medical, HoZac, Shit Sandwich
- Members: Srini Radhakrishna, Hideo Takahashi, David Storberg, Danny Henry
- Past members: Jacques Wait, Brian Shuey, Alex Rose
- Website: Bandcamp

France Has the Bomb is an alternative rock band from Minneapolis, Minnesota, described as "the new sound of Minneapolis" in 2009 by Rolling Stone magazine. The group consists of Srini Radhakrishna (vocals, guitar), Hideo Takahashi (guitar), David Storberg (bass) and Alex Rose (drums). The group has received considerable airplay on Minneapolis' Radio K.

== History ==
The group was formed by Srini Radhakrishna in 2007 when he moved back to Minneapolis after attending grad school in Chicago, Illinois. He originally recruited Danny Henry and Brian Shuey to help him record some songs that he had written while in Chicago. The original intention was for the band to just be a recording project, but when Jered Gummere, a former bandmate from the Guilty Pleasures, invited Srini to open for his current band, the Ponys, additional members were recruited to form a live band.

The band was signed by Dusty Medical Records who released their debut 45 "World Of Mirrors". They were next picked up by HoZac Records who released their next 45 "Invisible Angle". A split 45 with the band Tiger Bones followed on Shit Sandwich Records.

In May 2018, the lineup of Daniel Henry, Srini Radhakrishna, David Storberg, and Hideo Takahashi released the digital LP ...But We Must Cultivate Our Garden.

== The band's name ==
Srini stated that he didn't want a band name like "The Somethings" or a name that gave an indication as to the genre of the band. The band's name was coined by Brian Shuey.

== Influences ==
Srini cites bands such as The Clean, The Folk Implosion, Wire and Guided by Voices as influences. Jacques Wait described the band's sound as "dance-y, garage-y indie rock that kicks ass but is also fun" Journalist David Hansen described the sound as "jagged-edged pop-rock".

== Reception ==
- Rolling Stone magazine described the band as "Rocketing tempos, right-angle guitars and ragged-throated vocals."
- Christopher Matthew Jensen, of the City Pages, described the band's sound as "an aural painting of the rock 'n' roll canon".
- David Hansen, also from the City Pages, described their songs as "four-minute nuggets gleam like uncut gems".
- Brett Cross, from Victim of Time magazine, said the band "play a brilliant concoction of pop-tinged rock that straddles the lines between a number of genres and refreshingly defies the one word categorizations often used to describe a certain sound".
- In another review, Brett Cross said the band "lay out cagey, self-conscious tunes that sprawl a sonic map that their peers would have a hard time keeping up with".
- David Hansen, writing for vita.mn, said the band "manages all the explosiveness of our thermonuclear allies across the pond, without all the snooty posturing".
- Brian Banks, editor for the UK's "Music Vice" magazine, described the band as being "rich in garage and post-punk flavours".

== Members ==
=== Current members ===
- Srini Radhakrishna (vocals, guitar) - Football, Guilty Pleasures, White Outs
- Hideo Takahashi (guitar) - Birthday Suits, Sweet JAP
- David Storberg (bass) - the Misfires, Double Bird, Signal to Trust
- Danny Henry (drums) - The Soviettes, The Awesome Snakes, International Robot

=== Past members ===
- Jacques Wait (bass) - Rank Strangers, Pink Mink, Mark Mallman, Ouija Radio (producer), The Soviettes (producer)
- Brian Shuey (guitar) - International Robot, the Dynamiters
- Alex Rose (drums) - Vampire Hands, the Chambermaids

== Discography ==
=== Singles ===
- "World Of Mirrors" / "Cold Hands" (Dusty Medical Records - DMR-11) 7" 2008
- "Invisible Angle" / "Grim Trigger" (HoZac Records - HZR-025) 7" 2008
- "Open Wound" / "Walk Right" (Tiger Bones) (Shit Sandwich Records - SS-180) 7" 2009

=== Albums ===
- ...But We Must Cultivate Our Garden (Diminished Arc Records) LP 2018
