= Civil War (album) =

Studio album by Dillinger Four
- Released: October 14, 2008
- Recorded: July – August 2008
- Genre: Punk rock
- Length: 39:45
- Label: Fat Wreck Chords
- Producer: Dave Gardener

Dillinger Four chronology
Situationist Comedy (2002)	Civil War (2008)

Civil War (stylized as C I V I L W A R) is the fourth album by the Minneapolis, Minnesota punk rock band Dillinger Four, released on October 14, 2008, by Fat Wreck Chords. It is the band's second album for the label, following 2002's Situationist Comedy. Its recording and production took place over several years, and its release date was pushed back several times. An early internet leak of the album was the source of some controversy.

== Recording and delayed release ==
Dillinger Four had announced as early as June 2006 that Civil War would be released on October 31 of that year. However that August they amended the expected release date to March 2007. In November 2006 drummer Lane Pederson stated that the band were "working at D4 speed on a new record. About half of the songs are written." A month later bassist Patrick Costello announced in an interview that the album would be released in the Spring of 2007, stating that it was being pushed back so that the band would be better prepared to tour in support of it:

We're aiming for the Spring but we're not being that vague just because of concerns of when the record's ready. It's more to do with when we want to tour. Right now it's more that Lane's having a baby and Billy might be selling his house. Just all sorts of crazy shit like that. We're waiting to see when would be the best time that we could leave for two and half months.

The album went unreleased in the Spring and Summer of 2007, however, and guitarist Bill Morrisette stated in September that the band were still working on it:

The new record is coming along great! The new jams are high energy, and are gonna be a blast to play live. We're working on really using all three vocals, which we used to do a bit more in the early days and works great, and people always seem to want more of, so that will be fun. But mostly I expect a great Dillinger Four record: fun, fast-paced, great change-ups and a couple songs on this one where it's a bit different than stuff we've done before.

In December 2007 guitarist Erik Funk remarked on the album's progress, stating in the Minneapolis-Saint Paul Star Tribune that "We have a lot of stuff written and are gonna take the next few months to finish an album." Months continued to pass with no release details, however, and on April 1, 2008, the music news website Punknews.org poked fun at Civil War's long-delayed release by making a fake news post in celebration of April Fools' Day giving false cover artwork and song titles for the album. In July Dillinger Four announced that they were entering a recording studio to finish the album, and that it would be completed by August. This recording session took place at The Terrarium in Minneapolis with producer Dave Gardener. On August 19, 2008 Fat Wreck Chords posted the official cover artwork on their website and set a release date of October 14. The full track listing was subsequently listed on the band's official website and the Fat Wreck Chords website. On September 16 the band posted the song "Americaspremierfaithbasedinitiative" for listening on their Myspace profile, and on September 18 Fat Wreck Chords made the song available as a free download through their website. The full album was made available for listening in streaming media on the band's Myspace profile on October 8.

In an interview with Chart magazine shortly before Civil War's release, Funk reflected on the reasons for the long delay:

We weren't trying not to put out a record. It was just one thing after another and time flew by. When you don't do your band like a career like us, you've got other things to do than worry about getting records made. If you don't put a deadline on it, it may never get done. Like us, you turn around and it's been six years. The first year or two after the last record, we were still touring and not thinking about making an album. Then, in the third year, we were busy and it took a few months to write and get in the studio. There's lag time at the label and then it's winter... It just goes on and on. When NOFX asked us if we wanted to go on the road with them, we thought it would be fun, but we thought it would be better if we had the record finished. We hadn't planned on being done in October. It was for later in the year, so we had to kick it in high gear and get into the studio. Everything worked backwards from there 'cause if we had fucked it up, we'd be looking at 2009 before the album was done. That deadline really got it all together, but it was only a matter of a few weeks. We'd planned to go into the studio three weeks after we actually did. We'd have only rehearsed with the luxury time, so we were ready. Most of [Civil War's songs were written in] the last 12 months, so it's a new record, not stuff we were sitting on and hadn't recorded. It's also not like we were writing these songs for the last six years. Once we were ready, it came together surprisingly quickly, and I think people will be kind of shocked but happy with the results.

Funk described the album as "all around slicker, occasionally heavier, more melodic, poppier and longer" than previous Dillinger Four albums.

== Internet leak controversy ==
An early internet leak of Civil War was a source of some controversy. Aaron Hale-Williams, a writer for the online publication Racket Magazine, was given a password-encoded streaming media version of the album by Fat Wreck Chords so that he could publish a review prior to its release. Hale posted the password and a link to the album stream on the music news website Punknews.org, and the album soon spread onto peer-to-peer networks after the streaming audio was converted into MP3 format. Racket Magazine Editor Jonathan Yost learned of the leak from Hale and contacted Fat Wreck Chords: "He called me to tell me how good it was, and mentioned that he gave it to 'two or three' people. I scoped it on PunkNews and saw that it was all over the place, so [I] dropped Fat a line to change the password before it got too far out of control." Meanwhile, Hale had been submitting samples of his writing to Scott Heisel, Music Editor for Alternative Press and former editor for Punknews.org. Heisel had been covering news of Civil War's recording and development for Alternative Press and learned of the album leak, which he called "illegal...immoral and immature." He contacted Fat Wreck Chords to inform them of the situation at about the same time as Yost, and learned that the Hale was the suspected source of the leak:

When I asked a friend who worked for Fat where they think the leak came from, they pinpointed it to one specific person from a specific magazine (again, not AP) who had been begging them to hear the record. Upon hearing this person's name, I realized that same person had been emailing and IMing me incessantly for the past few weeks about trying to write for AP...Once I found out the label was holding him responsible for the leak, I promptly wrote him and let him know that AP doesn't use writers who leak records, so I would not need his services.

Yost subsequently fired Hale from Racket Magazine, explaining that "it was very obvious that this was a giant fuck up on our homeslice's part. So...it was my decision to fire Aaron from Racket." Hale responded with his version of events on his blog:

I'm sorry for whom I hurt [at Fat Wreck Chords], but the truth is...I did my job, in a roundabout way. I got people, in a way, really hyperventilating about a band that's been dormant for nearly a decade. In the terms of underground music...that's nearly impossible, with so many bands worthy of attention falling on and off the radar nearly daily. Not that this particular band needs any help, but with years and years of taunting new releases, new music, and then shooting them down, it became a game of "band who cried album."

The webcomic Nothing Nice to Say satirized the internet leak of Civil War, prompting indignation from the album's producer Dave Gardener.

In the wake of the controversy artist Mitch Clem published a six-part comic strip satirizing the events in his webcomic Nothing Nice to Say. He received an email from the album's producer Dave Gardener criticizing his satire of the situation: "As the guy who recorded the record I have to say I found your attempt at social commentary via satire was pretty weak and actually fairly insulting. If you had any idea of the work that all of us, the band, the other guy who did the record and honestly the label put into making the record happen you might have an inkling over how shitty the leaking of the record is to us all." Clem responded that the comic was actually intended to oppose music piracy, not to advocate it. Punknews.org editor Jesse Raub addressed the situation in his blog, stating that "It sucks that Mr. Hale's decision to share the album with his friends turned out this way. But he is directly responsible for the leak and needs to accept accountability for his actions. You can't place the blame on everyone but you because they were forced to react to your initial actions." Punknews.org posted a synopsis of the controversy, stating that "Punknews.org does not support or condone leaking albums. It's not just about the commerce; there are many people who work on an album like this one, it is fair for people to at least be compensated for the time they took away from other jobs, families and friends in order to put together an album for you."

In an interview with Dillinger Four singer/guitarist Erik Funk for Alternative Press on the day before the album's release, Heisel asked what Funk thought of the controversy surrounding Civil War's online leak. Funk replied that the band members do not have a strong stance on the issue and were surprised at the controversy:

We were surprised to see it become as big--I mean, the story became way bigger than our part in it. Or it wasn't really about our record. It was just about that circumstance. For us, none of us have a real strong position against people sharing music. I mean, I think that's fine. We didn't feel like we were getting ripped off or anything. Everything else related to it, between that writer and his boss... [Laughs.]... Whatever else happened, I feel like we're out of it.

== Critical reception ==
Professional ratings
Review scores
Source	Rating
AbsolutePunk	90%link
AllMusic	link
Alternative Press	3/5 stars
Pitchfork Media	6.4/10link

Critical response to Civil War was generally positive. Online retailer Interpunk.com called the album "worth every second of the interminable wait. From the opening note of the first track it's blatantly apparent that the guys in D4 haven't lost a step". Reviewer Jason Lymangrover of Allmusic commented that the album "[holds] strong to their melodic punk roots, but [shows] a new, more mature side of the band. The fiery pep is still intact here, but the carefree days of 'He's a Shithead (Yeah, Yeah)' have been replaced with thoughtful lyrics dealing with social injustices...it's their most glossy, most consistent, most calm, and surprisingly, their most socially relevant album, despite their approach toward middle age on a teen-oriented punk playground." Chris Fallon of Absolutepunk.net also praised the album, calling it "a new stitch in a damaged American flag; it's the healthy new dose of oxygen we are severely in need of in a crippled music industry starved of substance." He particularly praised the band's songwriting and use of melody, stating that "The record is audibly more melodic than previous releases, with a focus on pop-infused choruses and hooks, all while still containing that raw focal point the band has continually reached for on past albums." Maximum Rocknroll magazine coordinator Justin Briggs wrote in the December 2008 issue, "[...] While nothing they ever do will knock Midwestern Songs of the Americas from the position of 'DILLINGER FOUR's best album,' which is an impossible feat among impossibilities in itself, Civil War has tracks that I'd definitely put on a 'Best of DILLINGER FOUR' mixtape - quite a few, actually. [...] Just f**king buy it already."

Not all reviewers praised the album, however. Scott Heisel of Alternative Press gave it three out of five stars, noting that the band's extended period of inactivity did not allow them to test the new songs in front of an audience, and thus "the band's fourth proper full-length isn't the New Testament of beard-punk that so many Fest attendees want it to be." He also remarked that their hiatus had distanced them from contemporary punk, and thus Civil War sounds dated and "lacks bite and innovation." Heisel also felt that it did not measure up to the promise of the band's earlier work, stating that "While the album has bright spots, overall it feels a bit dull and without the spark that made 1998's Midwestern Songs of the Americas so fresh and exciting. With the albatross around their neck finally loosened, Dillinger Four have the talent to return with another truly great, defining punk album–hopefully it'll be before 2014." Kyle Ryan of The A.V. Club remarked that the album was "mostly interchangeable with its predecessors, right down to the silly samples that bookend the songs" and that "after six long years, it would've been nice for Dillinger Four to deliver something beyond more of the same". He did note, however, that the band's pop tendencies were more prominent than on previous releases, and that Funk's vocals were clearer, citing "Contemplate This on the Tree of Woe" and "Americaspremierefaithbasedinitiative" as strong tracks and saying that "Fruity Pebbles" "may be D4's most accessible song yet".

Punknews.org ranked the album at number two on their list of the year's 20 best releases.

== Track listing ==
All songs written by Dillinger Four (Patrick Costello, Erik Funk, Bill Morrisette, and Lane Pederson)

1. "A Jingle for the Product" - 3:47
2. "'Contemplate This on the Tree of Woe.'" - 3:03
3. "Parishiltonisametaphor" - 2:59
4. "Gainesville" - 3:39
5. "Ode to the North American Snake Oil Distributor" - 2:29
6. "Minimum Wage is a Gateway Drug" - 2:24
7. "The Classical Arrangement" - 2:24
8. "Americaspremierefaithbasedinitiative" - 3:21
9. "The Art of Whore" - 3:14
10. "Fruity Pebbles" - 3:06
11. "A Pyre Laid for Image and Frame" - 2:51
12. "Like Eye Contact in an Elevator" - 3:10
13. "Clown Cars on Cinder Blocks" - 3:18

== Personnel ==
=== Performers ===
- Patrick Costello - bass guitar, vocals
- Erik Funk - vocals, guitar
- Bill Morrisette - guitar, vocals
- Lane Pederson - drums
- Jake Luck - piano intro on "Parishiltonisametaphor"

=== Production ===
- Produced by Dave Gardener.
- Recorded and mixed by Eric Olsen and Dave Gardener at the Terrarium, Underwood and magento, Minneapolis, Minnesota.
- Mastered by Dave Gardnener and Bruce Templeton at Magneto Mastering, Minneapolis, Minnesota

=== Artwork and layout ===
- Cover art and flags by John Grider
- Layout design by Jason McShane Miller
- Inside cover photo by Brian Kelleher
- Live band photos by Brian Garrity
