= The Giraffes Show 07.25.09 =

Video by The Giraffes
- Released: May 25, 2010
- Recorded: July 2009
- Genre: Live
- Label: Crustacean Records

The Giraffes Show 07.25.09 is a concert film by the Brooklyn-based hard rock band, The Giraffes. It was filmed at the Union Pool in Brooklyn, New York in July 2009. This is the band's first live release.

Show is sold by Crustacean Records as a Deluxe DVD+CD set.

== Track listing DVD & CD ==
1. "Smoke Machine"
2. "Done"
3. "Prime Motivator"
4. "Honest Men"
5. "The Power of Fatherhood"
6. "Medicaid Benefit Applique'"
7. "The Border"
8. "The City"
9. "The Kids"
10. "Sickness (This Is)
11. "Having Fun"
12. "Sugarbomb"

=== DVD Bonus Features ===
1. The Special Features That No One Watches
2. Answers To Questions No One Gives A Shit About
3. Million $ Man (Drunk Version)
4. Alternate Ending
