= Xilin =

Xilin may refer to:

- Xilin (mythology) or qilin, a mythical creature of ancient China
- Xilin District, a district in Yichun, Heilongjiang, China
- Xilin County, a county in Guangxi, China
- Xilin Gol League, a prefecture-level division of Inner Mongolia, China
- Xilin River, a river in Inner Mongolia, China
- Xilin MRT station, an upcoming Mass Rapid Transit station on the Downtown MRT line in Singapore

== See also ==
- Kirin (disambiguation)
- Kylin (disambiguation)
- Qilin (disambiguation)
- Xiling (disambiguation)
