= LP III =

2005 album by the Soviettes

Studio album by The Soviettes
- Released: June 28, 2005
- Recorded: February 2005 at the Terrarium in Minneapolis, Minnesota
- Genre: Punk rock
- Length: 28:21
- Label: Fat Wreck Chords
- Producer: Jacques Wait

The Soviettes chronology
| LP II (2004) | LP III (2005) | Rarities (2010) |

LP III is the third album by the Minneapolis punk rock band The Soviettes. It was released on CD and LP on June 25, 2005, to mixed critical reviews.

== Recording and release ==
LP III continued the Soviettes' trend of numerically naming their albums (their previous two albums being LP and LP II). Unlike the previous two which were signed with Adeline Records, this album was signed with Fat Wreck Chords. Reflecting on the change, bandmember Maren "Sturgeon" Macosko noted in an interview that "[t]he biggest difference between Adeline and Fat is, well, the size." The second track on the album, "¡Paranoia Cha Cha Cha!", was first released on April 20, 2004, on the Rock Against Bush, Vol. 1 compilation, part of the Rock Against Bush series. The disc was produced by Fat Wreck Chords, making "¡Paranoia Cha Cha Cha!" the first Soviettes track on the label.

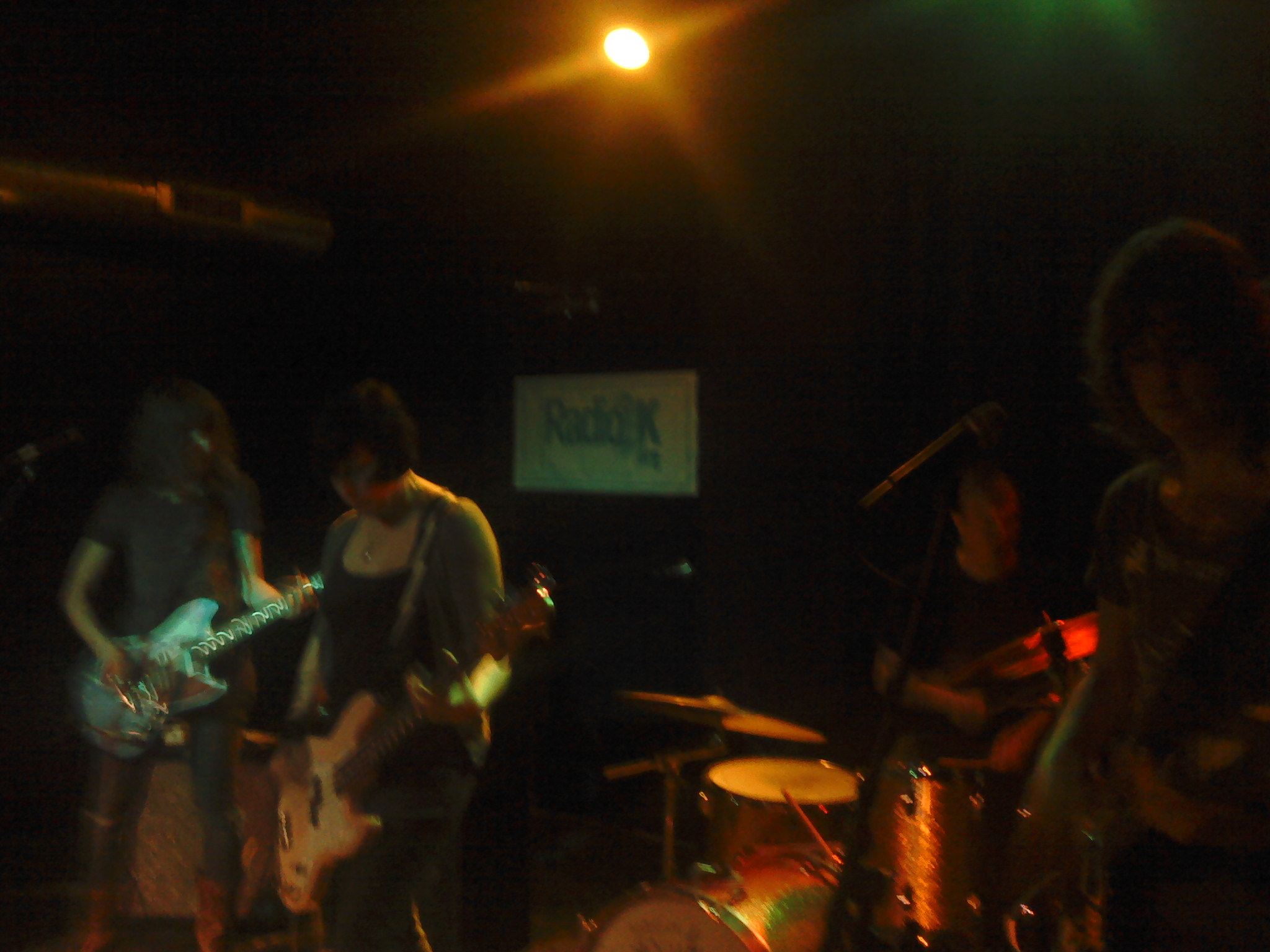
The Soviettes playing at one of their reunion shows in 2010.

The other tracks on the album were recorded at the Terrarium Studios in Northeast Minneapolis during February, 2005. As before, Annie Holoien and Maren "Sturgeon" Macosko played guitar, Danny Henry played the drums, and Susy Sharp played the bass guitar while all four bandmembers sang. Every track on the album clocked in at under three minutes in length. The album was released on June 28, 2005, on CD and limited-edition pink vinyl, of which 220 copies were pressed. "Roller Girls" was used from 2010 to 2016 as a "hype video" for the Minnesota RollerGirls, the roller derby league which inspired the song, and continued to be used afterward as the skate-out theme for the B-Team Minnesota Nice.

In early September, 2005, Macosko hinted that there would be an LP IV in the future. This never happened, as the band broke up thereafter. Nonetheless, the band reunited in 2010 to play several shows in the Twin Cities and released a fourth album, called Rarities.

== Reception ==
LP III was met with mixed reviews, although it was professionally reviewed only a few times. It was given a positive review in Allmusic, noting its melodies and harmonies and calling it "the Soviettes' best-performed record yet". The service did note the short length of the album as its downfall, but otherwise had no negative feedback and rated the album as a four out of five.

In a review from IGN, the album was noted as a disappointment in comparison to LP II, noting only "Multiply and Divide" and "¡Paranoia Cha Cha Cha!" as bright spots on the album. ("¡Paranoia Cha Cha Cha!" was discounted, however, since it had already been out since the previous year and was thus a repeat.) They gave the album a six and a half out of ten.

== Track listing ==
=== Side one ===
1. "Multiply and Divide" – 2:47
2. "¡Paranoia Cha Cha Cha!" – 2:03
3. "Middle of the Night" – 2:14
4. "Whoa" – 1:11
5. "(Do) The Stagger" – 1:58
6. "You Should Know" – 1:27
7. "What Did I Do?!" – 1:48

=== Side Two ===
1. "Roller Girls" – 1:43
2. "Together" – 2:02
3. "Thinking of You" – 2:51
4. "Hanging Up the Phone" – 2:18
5. "How Do You Like That" – 1:34
6. "Photograph" – 1:55
7. "Gotta Decide" – 2:30

== Personnel ==
- Annie Holoien – guitar, vocals
- Maren "Stugeon" Macosko – guitar, vocals
- Danny Henry – drums, vocals
- Susy Sharp – bass guitar, vocals
