= Pretty in Pink (disambiguation) =

Pretty in Pink is a 1986 American film.

Pretty in Pink may also refer to:

== Music ==
- "Pretty in Pink" (song), a 1981 song by The Psychedelic Furs, re-recorded in 1986 for a film with the same name
- "Pretty in Pink", a song from the album After the Lights by Sweetbox
- Pretty in Pink, an album by Seagull Screaming Kiss Her Kiss Her
- Pretty in Pink, a girl group featuring producer Maurissa Tancharoen

== Film and television ==
- Pretty in Pink, an AVN Award-nominated all-girl pornographic film
- "Pretty in Pink", an episode of the reality show Newport Harbor: The Real Orange County
- "Pretty in Pink", an episode of The Cat in the Hat Knows a Lot About That!

== Computing ==
- Pretty in Pink, a computer software game by Legacy Games

== See also ==
- Prettier in Pink, an album by Prettier Than Pink
- Pretty in Puke, an EP by The Giraffes
- "Pretty in Punk", a song by Fall Out Boy
- Pretty in Black, an album by The Raveonettes
- "Petty in Pink", an episode of Gossip Girl, a television series
