= Ruled =

Studio album by The Giraffes
- Released: December 31, 2017
- Genre: Hard rock, punk rock
- Length: 49:43
- Label: Crustacean Records

The Giraffes chronology
Prime Motivator (2008)	Ruled (2017)

Ruled is the fifth full-length LP by The Giraffes. Drums, bass and principal guitar tracks recorded at The Bunker in Brooklyn, NY. Vocals and additional guitars recorded at Strangeweather in Brooklyn, NY. Mixed at Studio G in Brooklyn, NY by Joel Hamilton. Mastered by Julian Silva at On Air Mastering. Produced by The Giraffes and Joel Hamilton.

== Track listing ==
All songs written by The Giraffes.

1. "The Border" - 3:10
2. "The Bed" - 5:58
3. "The City" - 6:47
4. "The Kids" - 3:35
5. "The Invasion" - 2:23
6. "The Store" - 6:32
7. "The War of Hormones" - 7:59
8. "The Occupation" - 13:24

== Personnel ==
- Aaron Lazar - vocals
- Damien Paris - guitar
- Jens Carstensen - bass
- Andrew Totolos - drums
- James SK Wān – bamboo flute
- Joel Hamilton - engineer, mixer
- Marc Alan Goodman - engineer
- Titfinger - art direction
