= The Awesome Snakes =

Punk rock band from Minnesota, active 2004-2010

Awesome Snakes
- Awesome Snakes

Background information
- Origin: Minneapolis, Minnesota, United States
- Genres: Punk rock; indie rock
- Years active: 2004–2010
- Labels: Crustacean Records, Ass Records, Stand Up! Records
- Past members: Annie Holoien; Danny Henry

The Awesome Snakes were a two-person punk rock band from Minneapolis, Minnesota, featuring Annie Sparrows (The Soviettes, The God Damn Doo Wop Band) on bass and Danny Henry (The Soviettes, France Has The Bomb, International Robot) on drums.

== History ==
The Awesome Snakes grew out of the Soviettes as a side project in 2004, when the Soviettes were touring nationally and earning increasing critical buzz. Sparrows and Henry, renaming themselves "Annie Awesome" and "Danny Snakes", started the duo as a way to ease the pressure by making what Henry described as a "jokey" and "free and loose" set of punk songs, spiced with audio samples from Henry's collection of odd self-help and how-to tapes.

The instrumentation is deliberately simple, just Sparrows on bass and Henry on drums, with the bass played through a Fender Blues Deville amplifier on high distortion. The lyrics are also highly focused; A.V. Club writer Christopher Bahn noted that the song topics revolve around "two subjects: snakes and/or things that are awesome."

In 2004, the cassette-only indie label Home Taping Is Killing the Record Industry released the band's self-titled debut.

Their second album, Venom, was released July 17, 2006, on Wisconsin record label Crustacean Records. It featured fifteen tracks recorded in much higher fidelity than the debut cassette by their friend Ross and mastered by Dave Gardner, and features a guest appearance by Twin Cities MC P.O.S.

The band appears on the 2008 Crustacean Records double-disc DVD retrospective Drown Out the Daylights.

In 2009, the band released a four-song digital EP, Snake Cake, on Minneapolis' Ass Records.

The duo's last show as Awesome Snakes was on March 19, 2010, at the Turf Club in St. Paul, Minnesota; the same night as the release show for The Soviettes' retrospective Rarities album.

On October 15, 2021, Venom was re-released on vinyl by Stand Up! Records, with the four songs from Snake Cake included as bonus tracks.

=== Successors ===
Sparrows' post-Snakes groups include The Horrible and the Miserable, Bermuda Squares, and Panel. In 2019, Sparrows and Henry formed a new rock quartet, Green/Blue, with former members of two other Minneapolis punk bands, The Blind Shake and Birthday Suits. The band released a self-titled debut record in 2020.

== Critical reception ==
Venom enjoyed great critical success in the band's home state of Minnesota, being named one of the best albums of 2006 in the Star Tribune's annual Twin Cities Critics Tally and also making the best-of lists for The A.V. Club's Twin Cities edition and Pulse. The band's deliberately silly moniker also earned it a spot in the 2006 edition of The A.V. Club's tongue-in-cheek feature The Year in Band Names.

Andrea Swensson of City Pages said "they play with a seriousness that sharply contrasts the silly nature of their music." Stephanie Soucheray, writing for Sliver Magazine, said "Venom may be self-referential, vulgar, goofy and weird. But it is never pretentious. The album is the sound of people having fun, and people being honest about their musical intentions." Tim Thompson of Wisconsin's "Local Sounds Magazine" praised Venom's "huge, manic, underground sound ... delivering an almost disembodied psychedelic freak-out in the middle of a garage-punk record."

The album also received critical praise from several national publications, including Alternative Press, which called it "lo-fi, furious, primal garage-rock voodoo"; Maximumrocknroll, which called it "smart-arsed, snotty, arty and funny;" and Punk Planet, which called it "a fuzzed up and confrontationally comedic dose of garage bangers and pogo punk punishers." Punk zine Razorcake praised two early demos, 2006's The Stupid Demo and The Cheap-Ass Cassette Demo, calling them "low-fi garage punk that is poppy yet very psychedelic in a go-go kid way." The publication was less impressed with Venom itself, saying: "Overall, this seems like a joke band that must be really funny for the people who made it, but for the rest of us it's worth listening to maybe once at the most."

Reviewing the 2021 re-release, Jake Austen of Roctober Magazine said "This reissue of an early 2000s Midwestern ridiculous riff rock relic proves that nothing is as timeless as lo fi, stripped down, absurdist snake songs."

Venom
Review scores
| Source | Rating |
|---|---|
| Punknews.org | 3.5/5 stars |
| Sliver Magazine | B+ |
| Ultimate Guitar | 7.8/10 stars |

== Discography ==
- Awesome Snakes (2004, Home Taping Is Killing the Record Industry, cassette-only release)
- Venom (2006, Crustacean Records); re-released on vinyl by Stand Up! Records in 2021
- Snake Cake (October 12, 2009, Ass Records), digital-only EP; re-released on vinyl by Stand Up! Records in 2021 as part of Venom

== In other media ==
The song "I Want a Snake" is featured in two installments of Electronic Arts' skateboarding video game series Skate: Skate 2 and the Wii version of Skate It.
