= Prime Motivator =

Studio album by The Giraffes
- Released: October 3, 2008
- Genre: Hard rock, punk rock
- Length: 53:19
- Label: Crustacean Records

The Giraffes chronology
Pretty in Puke (2006)	Prime Motivator (2008)	Ruled (2011)

Prime Motivator is the fourth full-length LP by The Giraffes. It was recorded and mixed at Studio G in Brooklyn, NY by Joel Hamilton.

On July 25, 2010, the song "Done" was released by Ozone Entertainment as downloadable content on the Rock Band Network for Xbox 360. On August 3, 2011, the first Rock Band mashup song "American Hero vs. Done" mixed by Robin Skouteris and featuring Ron Wasserman and The Giraffes was also released by Ozone Entertainment as downloadable content on the Rock Band Network for Xbox 360.

== Track listing ==
All songs written by The Giraffes

1. "Prime Motivator" - 3:25
2. "Done" - 4:27
3. "The Power of Fatherhood" - 3:37
4. "Diskowarts" - 2:11
5. "Allergic to Magnets" - 2:43
6. "Medicaid Benefit Applique" - 6:56
7. "Honest Men" - 4:38
8. "Smoke Machine" - 3:52
9. "Clever Girls" - 5:07
10. "Sickness (This Is)" - 2:31
11. "Clever Boy" - 5:17
12. "Louis Gutherie Wants to Kill Me" - 5:16
13. "E.S.F." - 4:10
