= International Robot =

Punk rock band from Minneapolis

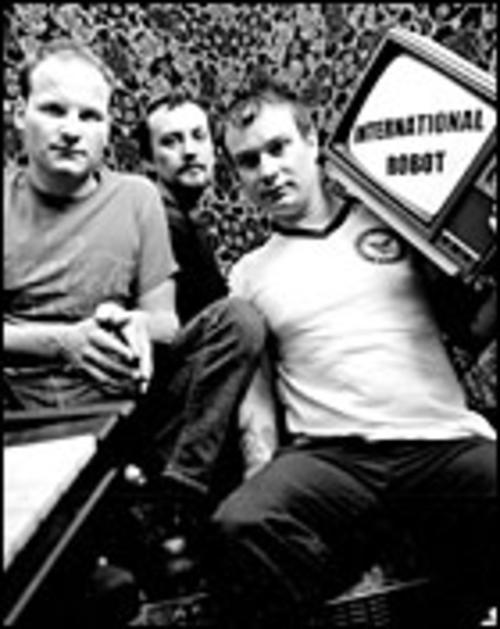
- Left to right: Brian Shuey, Morgan Kinnaman, Danny Henry. (Pic by Tony Nelson)

Background information
- Origin: Minneapolis, Minnesota, United States
- Genres: Punk rock
- Years active: 2000–2002
- Labels: Pop Riot
- Members: Danny Henry - drums, vocals Brian Shuey - guitar, vocals Morgan Kinnaman - bass
- Past members: Annie Holoien - bass

International Robot were a punk rock band from Minneapolis, Minnesota, founded in 2000. All of the group's members went on to form other notable bands on the Minneapolis punk scene, including the Soviettes, The Awesome Snakes, France Has The Bomb, the Dummies, the Prostitutes, the Voltz, the Dynamiters, Die Electric! and Dirty Robbers. All of these bands, including International Robot, have been covered by City Pages, the local music weekly newspaper.

The band's name is taken from a song title of the Saints, an Australian band that formed in the late 1970s.

== Members ==
- Brian Shuey (guitar, vocals) - the Dynamiters, The Voltz, Die Electric!, the Prostitutes
- Morgan "Slo Mo" Kinnaman (bass) - Dirty Robbers
- Danny Henry (drums, vocals) - The Soviettes, The Awesome Snakes, France Has The Bomb, the Dummies (as "Rock Bottom")
- Annie Holoien (bass) - The Soviettes, The Awesome Snakes, God Damn Doo Wop Band

== Discography ==
=== Albums ===
Title	Release date	Notes	Label
International Robot	2002	Self-titled debut album	Solid Sound Music

=== EPs and singles ===
Title	Release date	Notes	Label
International Robot	April 15, 2003	4-track EP.	Pop Riot
