= 麒麟 (disambiguation) =

麒麟, meaning qilin or giraffe, may refer to:

- Awaiting Kirin (麒麟がくる), 2020 Japanese historical drama television series
- Girin Eye (기린의 눈), Lee Kwang-Soo's new name in South Korean variety show Running Man
- Girin-myeon (기린면, 麒麟面), a township in South Korea
- Guo Qilin (郭麒麟; born 1996), Chinese actor and crosstalk (Xiangsheng) performer
- Kei Lun stop (麒麟站), at-grade MTR Light Rail stop

== See also ==
- The dictionary definition of 麒麟 at Wiktionary
- Giraffe (disambiguation)
- Girin (disambiguation)
- Kirin (disambiguation)
- Qilin (disambiguation)
