= Situationist Comedy =

Studio album by Dillinger Four
- Released: June 4, 2002
- Genre: Punk rock; melodic hardcore
- Length: 33:58
- Label: Fat Wreck Chords

Dillinger Four chronology
Versus God (2000)	Situationist Comedy (2002)	Civil War (2008)

Professional ratings
Review scores
Source	Rating
AllMusic	4/5 stars
Pitchfork Media	7.4/10

Situationist Comedy is an album by Dillinger Four, released in 2002.

The song title "Sell the House Sell the Car Sell the Kids Find Someone Else Forget It I'm Never Coming Back Forget It" is a reference to the film Apocalypse Now.

== Track listing ==
1. "Noble Stabbings!!" - 3:20
2. "A Floater Left with Pleasure in the Executive Washroom." - 2:37
3. "Fuzzy Pink Hand-Cuffs" - 2:09
4. "The Father, the Son, and the Homosexual/Single Parent" - 2:04
5. "Sell the House Sell the Car Sell the Kids Find Someone Else Forget It I'm Never Coming Back Forget It" - 2:02
6. "Folk Song." - 2:27
7. "Fired-Side Chat" - 2:56
8. "'I Was Born on a Pirate Ship' (Hold Your Tongue)" - 2:36
9. "D4=Putting the 'F' Back in 'Art'" - 2:12
10. "All Rise for the Rational Anthem" - 2:15
11. "Labour Issues in the Toy Department" - 3:45
12. "File Under 'Adult Urban Contemporary'" - 2:36
13. "New Punk Fashions for the Spring Formal" - 2:59
