= Versus God =

Studio album by Dillinger Four
- Released: June 20, 2000
- Genre: Punk rock; hardcore punk; melodic hardcore
- Length: 30:59
- Label: Hopeless

Dillinger Four chronology
| This Shit Is Genius (1999) | Versus God (2000) | Situationist Comedy (2002) |

Professional ratings
Review scores
| Source | Rating |
|---|---|
| AllMusic | 4/5 stars |
| Daily Herald | 3/4 stars |
| Ox-Fanzine | Favorable |

Versus God is a full-length album by Dillinger Four, released in 2000.

== Critical reception ==
The Riverfront Times wrote that "not since the Monkees has a band been this seriously subversive about the music they play, themselves and the industry they work for, and that's a compliment to both the Dillingers and the Monkees." The Reno Gazette Journal praised the "sweet lead vocals and barking backups, sensitive neo-folk and blistering rallying cries, non-sequitur samples and experiments and 4-to-the-floor high-speed anthems."

In a 2020 interview, Matt Pryor of The Get Up Kids called Versus God "arguably one of the greatest Punk Rock albums."

== Track listing ==
1. "Who Didn't Kill Bambi?" – 2:06
2. ""Get Your Study Hall Outta My Recess."" – 1:50
3. "Maximum Piss & Vinegar" – 2:17
4. "Last Communion" – 2:53
5. "Suckers, Intl. Has Gone Public" – 2:02
6. "Total.Fucking.Gone.Song" – 2:38
7. "Music Is None of My Business" – 1:39
8. "Define 'Learning Disorder'" – 2:23
9. "Let Them Eat Thomas Paine" – 3:10
10. "Shiny Things Is Good." – 3:04
11. "J. Harris" – 2:00
12. "Q: How Many Punks Does It Take to Change a Lightbulb?" – 2:24
13. "Wreck the Place Fantastic" – 2:33
