= Kyren =

Kyren may refer to:

- Kyren, Republic of Buryatia, Russia, a rural locality
- Kyren (name), includes a list of people with the name

== See also ==
- Kirin (disambiguation)
