= LP II =

2004 album by the Soviettes

Studio album by The Soviettes
- Released: April 13, 2004
- Recorded: February 2004 at The Terrarium in Minneapolis, Minnesota
- Genre: Punk rock
- Length: 23:15
- Label: Adeline
- Producer: Jacques Wait with The Soviettes

The Soviettes chronology
LP (2003)	LP II (2004)	LP III (2005)

Professional ratings
Review scores
Source	Rating
IGN (2004)	8.5/10
IGN (2005)	9.7/10
Ox-Fanzine	7/10

LP II is the second album by the Minneapolis punk band The Soviettes, released on April 13, 2004.

== Track listing ==
=== Side One ===
1. "Ten" – 1:18
2. "#1 Is Number Two" – 1:50
3. "Pass the Flashlight" – 1:37
4. "Goes Down Easy" – 1:30
5. "Winning Is for Losers" – 1:38
6. "Angel A" – 1:42
7. "Tonight" – 2:23

=== Side Two ===
1. "There's a Banana in My Ear" – 1:14
2. "Love Song" – 1:02
3. "Portland" – 1:59
4. "Channel X" – 2:02
5. "Whatever You Want" – 2:20
6. "Don't Say No" – 1:27
7. "Come on Bokkie!" – 1:13

All songs by the Soviettes

== Personnel ==
- Annie Holoien – guitar, vocals
- Maren "Stugeon" Macosko – guitar, vocals
- Danny Henry – drums, vocals
- Susy Sharp – bass guitar, vocals
