= Kirin =

Kirin may refer to:

== Mythology and fiction ==
- Qilin or Kirin, a mythical creature known in various East Asian cultures
  - Ki-rin (Dungeons & Dragons), a type of monster in Dungeons & Dragons
  - Kirin, a type of Elder Dragon in Monster Hunter
  - Kirin, a type of creature in the My Little Pony: Friendship Is Magic series

== Places ==
- Jilin or Kirin, a province in northeastern China
  - Jilin City or Kirin, a city in the province of Jilin, China
- Kirin, Croatia, a settlement in Vrginmost

== Companies and products ==
- Subsidiaries of Kirin Holdings:
  - Kirin Company, a Japanese beverages company
  - Kyowa Kirin, a Japanese pharmaceutical company
- Brasil Kirin, a Brazilian brewery and beverage company
- Kirin processors, a series of SoCs produced by HiSilicon

== Sports ==
- Kirin Cup Soccer, an association football tournament organised in Japan
- Kirin Open, a Japanese golf tournament from 1974 to 2001
- One of three shogi pieces in large shogi Kirin variants:
  - Chu shogi, which uses one piece per player
  - Dai shogi, which uses one piece per player
  - Taikyoku shogi, which uses the Kirin (麒麟) and Kirin-master (麟師) pieces

== Other uses ==
- Kirin (manga), a 1987 Japanese manga series
- Kirin language or Kili, a Tungusic language of Russia and China

== People with the name ==
- Ivica Kirin (born 1970), former Interior Minister of Croatia
- Kirin J. Callinan (born 1986), Australian singer and songwriter
- Kirin Kiki (1943–2018), Japanese TV and film actress
- Kirin Narayan (born 1959), Indian-born American anthropologist and writer
- Kirin Kotecha, a character in Emmerdale

== See also ==
- Girin (disambiguation)
- Keirin, a form of motor-paced cycle racing
- Kirin no Tsubasa, a 2012 Japanese film
- Kirino (disambiguation)
- Kylin (disambiguation)
- Kyren (disambiguation)
- Kyrin Galloway (born 1999), American-Australian basketball player
- Qilin (disambiguation)
- Xilin (disambiguation)
- 麒麟 (disambiguation)
