= Xiling =

Xiling may refer to:

- Xiling 西泠, now known as Hangzhou
- Xiling Seal Art Society, society for refined chops (official Chinese seals) based in Hangzhou
- Xiling District (西陵区), Yichang, Hubei
- Xiling Gorge (西陵峡), one of the Three Gorges
- Xiling Bridge (西陵长江大桥), bridge over Yangtze River
- Xiling, Changning (西岭镇), a town of Changning City
- Lin Xiling (1935–2009), Chinese activist and dissident
- Shen Xiling (1904–1940), Chinese film director
- Xiong Xiling (1870–1937), premier of the Republic of China from July 1913 to February 1914

== See also ==
- Xilin (disambiguation)
