= Rarities (Soviettes album) =

2010 compilation album by the Soviettes

Studio album by The Soviettes
- Released: March 16, 2010
- Recorded: 2002–2005 in Minneapolis, Minnesota
- Genre: Punk rock
- Length: 35:19
- Label: Red Sound Records, Rottentone Records
- Producer: Jacques Wait

The Soviettes chronology
LP III (2005)	Rarities (2010)

Rarities (typeset as [Rarities] on the artwork) is the fourth album, and first compilation, by the Minneapolis punk rock band The Soviettes. It is a selection of the group's lesser-known material, including their early EPs. It was released free on the internet and also in vinyl LP format.

A.V. Club reviewer Jack Spencer called the album "an excellent last hurrah," describing it as "quick bursts of spirited, guitar-driven rock, punctuated by 'woos'" and 'heys'."

== Track listing ==
1. "Hot Sauced and Peppered" – 2:34
2. "In the Red" – 1:21
3. "Go Lambs Go!" – 1:58
4. "Sandbox" – 1:25
5. "Matt's Song (Split Version)" – 2:46
6. "Sixty Days" – 2:03
7. "Latchkey" – 2:51
8. "Sunday AM" – 2:51
9. "The Nine To Life" – 2:35
10. "gossip@whogivesashit.com" – 1:53
11. "Twin Cities Sound" – 1:55
12. "30 Minutes or Less" – 1:37
13. "Mazacon" – 1:45
14. "Alright" – 1:33
15. "Plus One" – 1:19
16. "Old Man Reading a Book" – 1:59
17. "The Best of Me" – 1:33
18. "LPIII Original Intro" – 1:09

== Additional information ==
- Tracks 1 to 4 are from May 2002's T.C.C.P. EP.
- Tracks 5 to 10 are from November 2002's split EP with The Valentines.
- Track 11 is from the 2002 Havoc Records compilation "No Hold Back; All Attack"
- Tracks 12 & 13 are from 2003's split EP with The Havenot's.
- Tracks 14 & 15 are from the 2004 single "Alright".
- Tracks 16 to 18 are unused demos from the recording sessions for LP III.

== Personnel ==
- Annie Holoien – guitar, vocals
- Maren "Sturgeon" Macosko – guitar, vocals
- Susy Sharp – bass guitar, vocals
- Danny Henry – drums, vocals (tracks 5 to 18)
- Lane Pederson - drums, vocals (tracks 1 to 4)

== Reception ==
News of the album was reported and/or reviewed by Minnesota's "City Pages", Reviler magazine, Punk News, the Minneapolis Examiner, the A/V Club (twice) and the Twin Cities' Vita.mn magazine site.
