= T.C.C.P. =

2002 debut single by the Soviettes

EP by The Soviettes
- Released: 11 May 2002
- Recorded: 2001 S.O.S. Studios Minneapolis, Minnesota
- Genre: Punk rock
- Label: Pop Riot Records
- Producer: Mike Wedel

T.C.C.P is the debut release by the Minneapolis punk band The Soviettes. It was released on Pop Riot Records, a Minneapolis label run by Max Peters.

It's the only release by the Soviettes featuring Lane Pederson, of the Dillinger Four, on drums instead of Danny Henry. Razorcake magazine described the record as sweet, slashing and heavy, and said that "the Soviettes stand out in a lineup against the waves of mediocre bands attempting the same".

== Track listing ==
=== Side one ===
1. "Hot Sauced & Peppered" – 2:34
2. "In The Red" – 1:21

=== Side two ===
1. "Go Lambs Go!" – 1:58
2. "Sandbox" – 1:25

== Personnel ==
- Annie Holoien – guitar, vocals
- Maren "Sturgeon" Macosko – guitar, vocals
- Susy Sharp – bass guitar, vocals
- Lane Pederson – drums
