= The Giraffes (Brooklyn band) =

American musical group

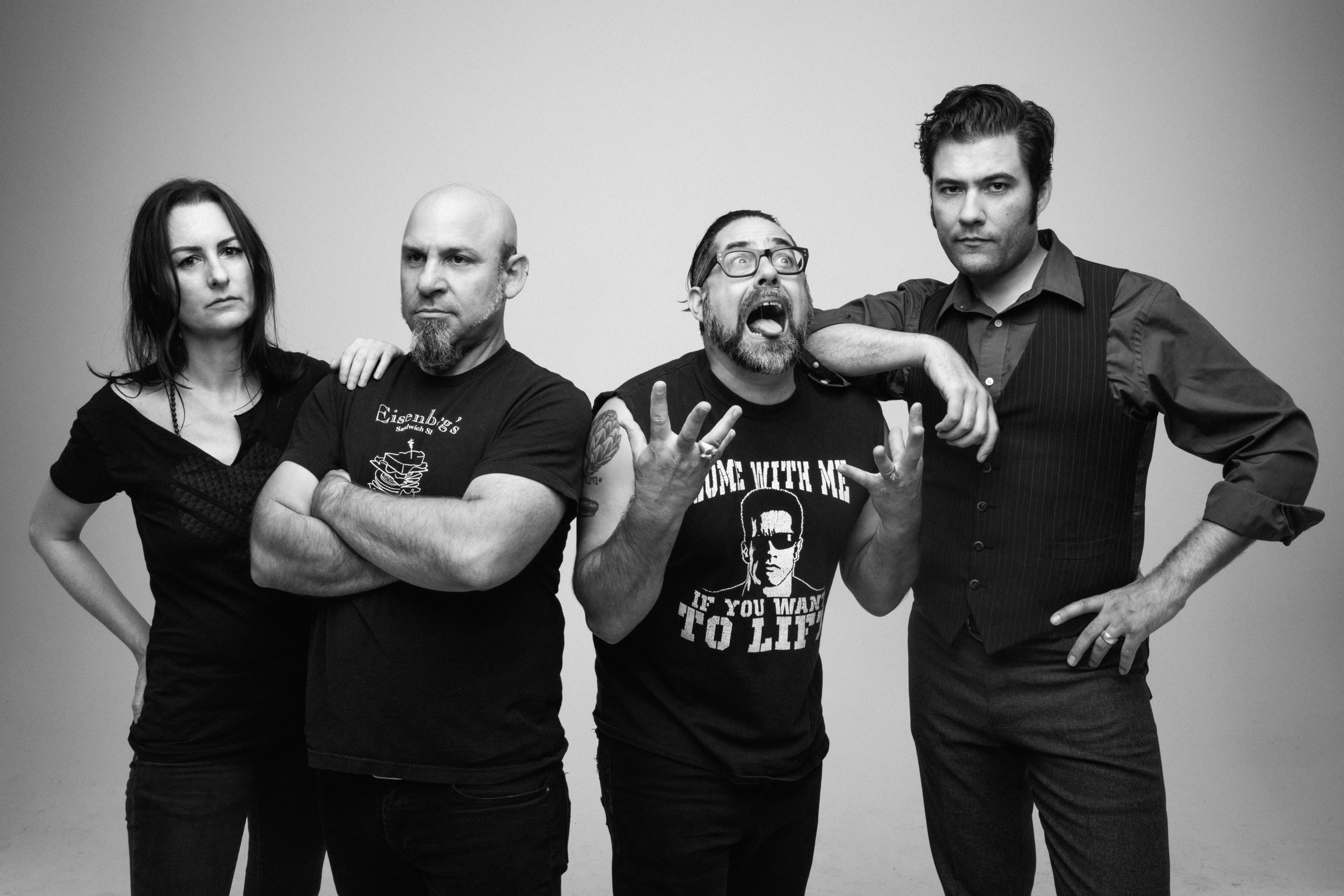

Formed in 1996 by Damien Paris, Andrew Totolos and Tim Kent, The Giraffes are an active hard rock band from New York City. In 2001 Singer Aaron Lazar joined the band and was with them till 2011, until he took a three years hiatus. In that time one record was released (Tales of the Black Whistle.) In 2014 singer Aaron Lazar rejoined the band and released the EP Usury. The current line-up consists of singer Aaron Lazar, guitarist Damien Paris, drummer Andrew Totolos, and bassist Hannah Moorhead. Their seventh full-length album, Flower of the Cosmos, was released in 2019 by Silver Sleeve and Rough Trade. The album was recorded at Studio G in Brooklyn and produced by Tony Maimone and Francisco Botero.

== Discography ==
=== Studio albums ===
- Franksquilt (1998) Apesauce Records
- Helping You Help Yourself (2002) Apesauce Records
- A Gentleman Never Tells (2003) Apesauce Records
- The Giraffes (2005) Razor & Tie
- Pretty in Puke (2006) Apesauce Records
- Prime Motivator (2008) Crustacean Records
- Ruled (2011) Crustacean Records
- Tales of the Black Whistle (2012) Apesauce Records
- Usury (2015) Silver Sleeve
- Flower of the Cosmos (2019) Silver Sleeve/Rough Trade Records

=== Video albums ===
- Show (2010) Crustacean Records

=== Official bootlegs ===
- Farewell, Fat Astronaut (2011) (Limited Release) Apesauce Records
