= Qilin (disambiguation) =

The qilin is a creature in Chinese and other East Asian mythologies. It may refer to:

Qilin may also refer to:

- Qilin District, Qujing, Yunnan
- Qilin, Anhui, a town in Zongyang County
- Qilin (cybercrime group)
- Qilin (mammal), an extinct genus of giraffid
- Qilinia (Qilin conch; 麒麟螺), a genus of snails in the subfamily Triculinae

== See also ==
- Kirin (disambiguation)
- Kylin (disambiguation)
- Girin (disambiguation)
- Xilin (disambiguation)
- 麒麟 (disambiguation)
