= Midwestern Songs of the Americas =

Studio album by Dillinger Four
- Released: June 23, 1998
- Recorded: April 1998
- Genre: Melodic hardcore; punk rock
- Length: 31:51
- Label: Hopeless

Dillinger Four chronology
Midwestern Songs of the Americas (1998)	This Shit Is Genius (1999)

Professional ratings
Review scores
Source	Rating
Allmusic	2.5/5 stars

Midwestern Songs of the Americas is an album by the punk rock band Dillinger Four. It was released in 1998.

== Track listing ==
1. "O.K. F.M. D.O.A." – 3:10
2. "#51 Dick Butkus" – 2:24
3. "It's a Fine Line Between the Monkey and the Robot" – 2:18
4. "Portrait of the Artist As a Fucking Asshole" – 2:15
5. "Twenty-One Said Three Times Quickly" – 2:50
6. "Super Powers Enable Me to Blend in With Machinery" – 2:09
7. "Doublewhiskeycokenoice" – 2:20
8. "Supermodels Don't Drink Colt .45" – 2:42
9. "Shut Your Little Trap, Inc." – 2:30
10. "Mosh for Jesus" – 2:13
11. "Hand Made Hard Times Handed Back" – 1:41
12. ""Honey, I Shit the Hot Tub"" – 1:41
13. "The Great American Going Out of Business Sale" – 3:38
