= LP (Soviettes album) =

2003 album by the Soviettes

Studio album by The Soviettes
- Released: June 17, 2003
- Recorded: January 2003–February 2003 at Seedy Underbelly Studio in Minneapolis, Minnesota
- Genre: Punk rock
- Length: 30:54
- Label: Adeline
- Producer: Jacques Wait

The Soviettes chronology
LP (2003)	LP II (2004)

Professional ratings
Review scores
Source	Rating
Allmusic	4/5 stars
IGN	8.4/10
Exclaim!	

LP is the 2003 debut album by the Minneapolis punk band The Soviettes. It was reissued on vinyl in 2022 by Dead Broke Rekerds and Rad Girlfriend Records.

== Track listing ==
=== Side one ===
1. "Blue Stars" – 1:52
2. "Bottom's Up, Bottomed Out" – 1:37
3. "9th St." – 2:29
4. "1308" – 2:11
5. "Go Lambs Go!" – 2:03
6. "B Squad" – 1:56
7. "Tailwind" – 1:53

=== Side two ===
1. "Matt's Song" – 2:48
2. "Clueless" – 1:27
3. "Thin Ice" – 1:17
4. "The Land of the Clear Blue Radio" – 2:37
5. "Undeliverable" – 2:54
6. "Cuff Wars" – 2:28
7. "Her Neon Heart" – 3:15

== Personnel ==
- Annie Holoien – guitar, vocals
- Maren "Stugeon" Macosko – guitar, vocals
- Danny Henry – drums, vocals
- Susy Sharp – bass guitar, vocals
