= USS Giraffe =

US Navy ship

History

United States
- Name: Sanford B. Dole; Giraffe
- Namesake: Sanford B. Dole; The giraffe
- Launched: 11 November 1943
- Commissioned: 12 December 1943
- Decommissioned: 17 June 1946
- Stricken: 3 July 1946
- Fate: Sold

General characteristics
- Displacement: 14,245 tons
- Length: 441 ft 6 in (134.57 m)
- Beam: 56 ft 11 in (17.35 m)
- Draught: 28 ft 4 in (8.64 m)
- Speed: 11 knots
- Complement: 108 officers and men
- Armament: one five-inch gun

USS Giraffe (IX-118) was a United States Navy ship in service between 1943 and 1946. It an Armadillo-class tanker designated an unclassified miscellaneous vessel.

The ship was the only ship of the U.S. Navy to be named for the giraffe, a large ruminant mammal of Africa, having a very long neck that makes it the tallest of quadrupeds. Her keel was laid down as Sanford B. Dole by the California Shipbuilding Corporation, in Wilmington, California. She was launched on 11 November 1943 sponsored by Miss Mary F. Leddy and commissioned on 12 December 1943 with Lieutenant Commander Frederick F. Daly, USNR, commanding.

Following shakedown, Giraffe put in at Funafuti, Ellice Islands, on 10 February 1944 and subsequently refueled warships at Eniwetok, Saipan, Guam, Ulithi, and Palau before reaching Okinawa on 21 July 1945. She entered Sasebo, Japan, on 20 November at war's end and served the occupation fleet until departing Yokosuka on 21 February 1946 for Pearl Harbor and Norfolk, Virginia. Giraffe reached Norfolk 3 May and decommissioned there 17 June 1946. Returned to the War Department that date, she was stricken from the Naval Vessel Register on 3 July 1946. She was subsequently sold to Metro Petroleum Shipping Company, Inc.

Giraffe was awarded two battle stars for World War II service.
