= Pretty in Puke =

Pretty In Puke

EP by The Giraffes
- Released: May 23, 2006
- Genre: Hard rock, punk rock
- Length: 18:28
- Label: Apesauce Records

The Giraffes chronology
The Giraffes (2005)	Pretty In Puke (2006)	Prime Motivator (2008)

Pretty In Puke is the fifth recording and third EP by The Giraffes. Recorded and mixed at Studio G in Brooklyn NY, by Joel Hamilton, it contains four new songs and a new recording of "I'll Be Your Daddy" which had previously appeared on the EP Helping You Help Yourself in a different version.

== Track listing ==
All songs written by The Giraffes

1. "This Is Sickness" – 2:33
2. "Twin Girls" – 3:43
3. "Tournequet" – 4:35
4. "Pisda Mati" – 3:38
5. "I'll Be Your Daddy" – 3:59
