= The Giraffes (album) =

Album by the giraffes

Studio album by The Giraffes
- Released: July 12, 2005
- Genre: Hard rock, punk rock
- Length: 43:20
- Label: Razor & Tie

The Giraffes chronology
A Gentleman Never Tells (2003)	The Giraffes (2005)	Pretty In Puke (2006)

Professional ratings
Review scores
Source	Rating
Allmusic	link

The Giraffes is the third full-length album by the hard rock band The Giraffes. It was released on Razor & Tie, and is their first record with the company. The track "Honey Baby Child" was written by and recorded in memory of Pierre Michel.

== Track listing ==
All songs written by the Giraffes, except "Honey Baby Child" written by Pierre Michel

1. "Jr. At His Worst" – 4:31
2. "Wage Earner" – 2:24
3. "Haunted Heaven" – 3:37
4. "Man U." – 5:14
5. "Having Fun" – 3:38
6. "Sugarbomb" – 5:16
7. "BLCKNTWHTCSTL" – 3:47
8. "Million $ Man" – 4:44
9. "79 & Weightless" – 4:24
10. "Honey Baby Child" – 5:45

== Personnel ==
- Damien Paris – guitar, vocals
- Andrew Totolos – drums, vocals
- John Rosenthal – bass, piano, vocals
- Aaron Lazar – lead vocals, engravings
- Jason Martin – engineer
- Joel Hamilton – additional tracking, mixing & fixing, additional vocals
- Mike Jansson – additional vocals
- Chris Dell'Olio – additional vocals
- Jeremy Dillahunt – additional vocals
- Frank Callaghan – additional vocals
- Bennet Callaghan – additional vocals
- James SK Wān – bamboo flute
- Tzgani Design – album design
- Todd Kancar – album design, additional vocals
- Andreaus Vesalius – engravings
- Chris Dell'Olio at Mastermind Management – management
