= Xilin River =

锡林

Location
- Country: China
- Region: Inner Mongolia Autonomous Region

The Xilin River (Chinese: 锡林) of Inner Mongolia, China, is located in the middle latitudes. A study of the land cover types recognized 17 sub-classes in the Xilin River Basin including nine types of steppe habitat based on the dominant grasses in different areas and eight non-grassland habitats including current cropland, harvested cropland, urban areas, wetlands, desertified land, saline and alkaline land, water bodies and lands which could not be classified because of cloud cover in satellite images.

== Geography ==
The east side of the Xilin River Basin is lined with 1500 m tall mountains and hills and to the west are the Daxing-An Mountains with the elevation along the River decreasing from southeast to northeast (902 m). The landscape of the basin is covered by lava tablelands, low mountains, hills, plateaus, and sandy lands. Diverse plant communities cover this area of steppes. Animal husbandry is important to the local economy. Stipa grandis steppe and Leymus chinensis steppe are dominant/climax plant habitats in the basin.

== Climate ==
The temperate steppe of the Xilin River Basin has an average annual precipitation of 350mm. The average annual temperature is 1.7 °C at Xilinhao. July, the hottest month, averages 20.8 °C. January is the coldest with the lowest monthly temperature averaging -19.8 °C. From southeast to northeast, the temperatures and frost-free period increases while precipitation decreases gradually.

== Cities along the river ==
Xilinhot lines along the middle of the Xilin River. Xier and Baiinxile are upstream from Xilinhot.

== Current conditions ==
Grassland degradation and desertification have increased because of overgrazing and inappropriate crop cultivation, which is a result of the growing human population and overgrazing has introduced new successional communities to the ecosystem, although efforts to study and improve the situation are ongoing.
