= Dillinger Four =

American punk rock band

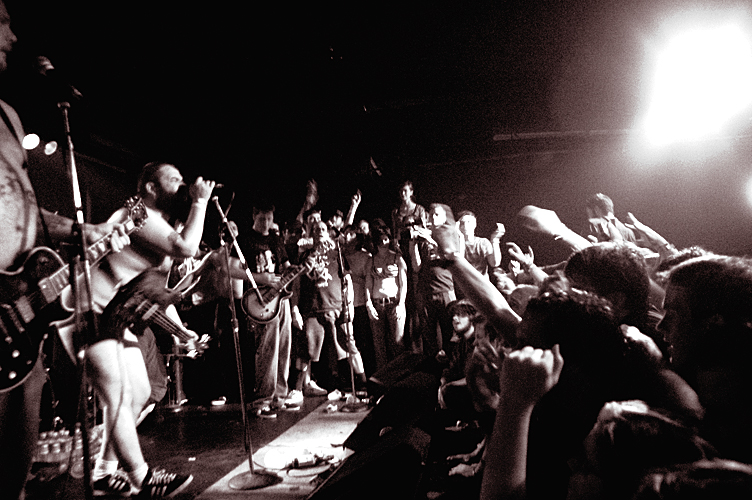
- Dillinger Four performing in 2006

Background information
- Origin: Minneapolis, Minnesota, U.S.
- Genres: Punk rock; melodic hardcore; hardcore punk
- Years active: 1994–present
- Labels: Hopeless, No Idea, Fat Wreck Chords
- Members: Patrick Costello; Erik Funk; Bill Morrisette; Lane Pederson
- Past members: Sloan Lorsung
- Website: angelfire.com/mn/dillingerfour

Dillinger Four (sometimes abbreviated as D4) is an American punk rock band formed in 1994 in Minneapolis, Minnesota. They have released four full-length studio albums. Since 1996, the band's lineup has been Patrick Costello on bass guitar and vocals, Erik Funk and Bill Morrisette on guitars and vocals, and Lane Pederson on drums.

== History ==
Dillinger Four was formed in 1994 by guitarist Erik Funk and bassist Patrick Costello. The two had previously played together in the Chicago-based hardcore band Angerhouse.

The original lineup, which also included guitarist Sloan Lorsung and drummer Lane Pedersen, released the 1995 debut 7" single Higher Aspirations: Tempered and Dismantled. Lorsung was replaced by Bill Morrisette before the 1996 follow-up EP The Kids Are All Dead. A series of subsequent singles and compilation appearances were later collected on 1999's This Shit is Genius. In June 1998, Dillinger Four joined As Friends Rust and Discount on a leg of their American tour.

The band was signed to California hardcore label Hopeless Records on the strength of what Hopeless founder Louis Posen called its "international following." The label released Dillinger Four's first two full-length records, 1998's Midwestern Songs of the Americas and 2000's Versus God. The band moved to Fat Wreck Chords for 2002's Situationist Comedy and 2008's Civil War.

Funk founded and co-owned the influential Minneapolis music venue Triple Rock Social Club, which opened in 1998 and closed in 2017. Dillinger Four played the venue's final concert in November 2017.

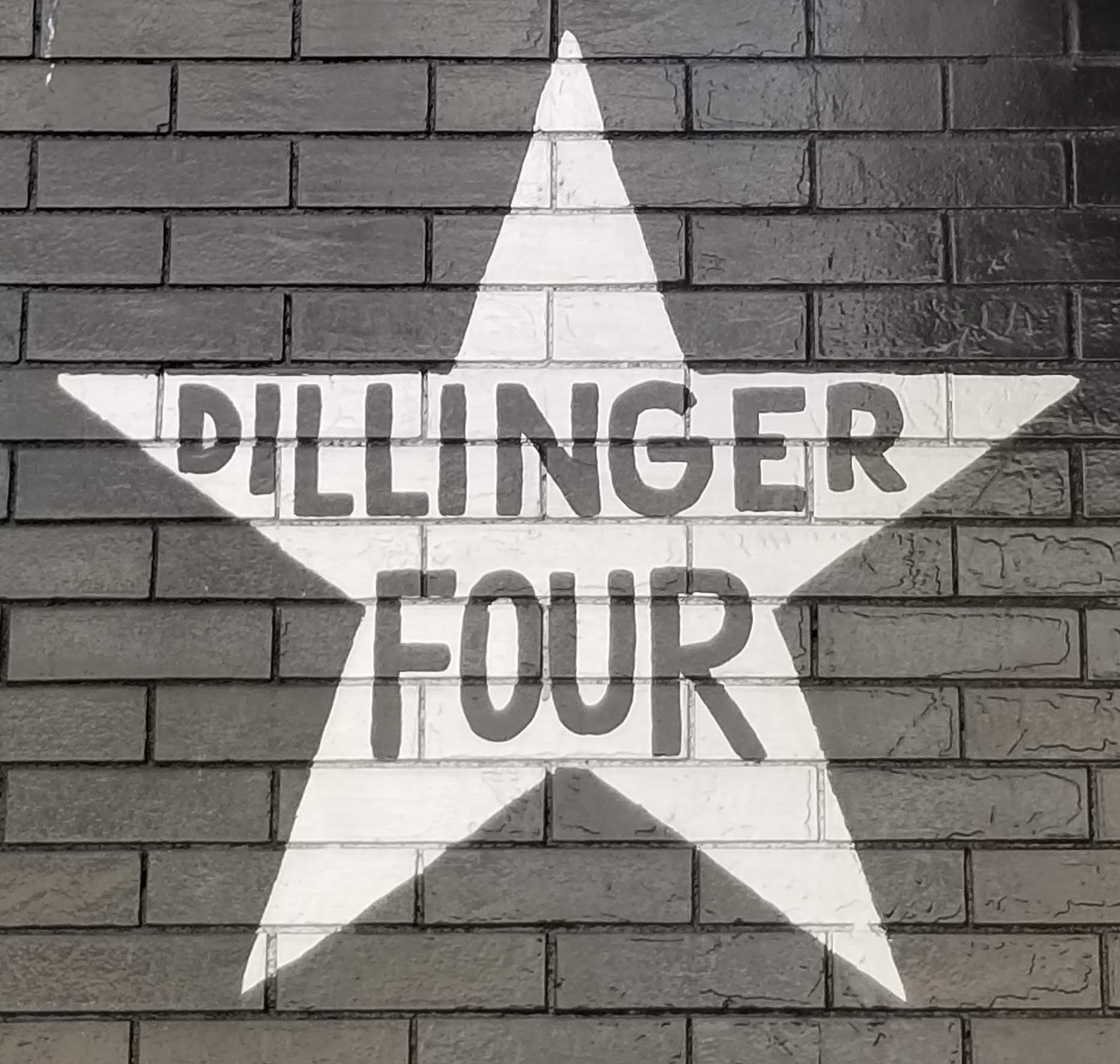
Star honoring Dillinger Four on the outside mural of the Minneapolis nightclub First Avenue

Dillinger Four has been honored with a star on the outside mural of the Minneapolis nightclub First Avenue, recognizing performers that have played sold-out shows or have otherwise demonstrated a major contribution to the culture at the iconic venue.

== Discography ==
=== Studio albums ===
- Midwestern Songs of the Americas (Hopeless Records, 1998)
- Versus God (Hopeless Records, 2000)
- Situationist Comedy (Fat Wreck Chords, 2002)
- Civil War (Fat Wreck Chords, 2008)

=== Live albums ===
- Live at First Avenue (2003)
- The End. Live At The Death Of The Triple Rock (2020)

=== Compilation albums ===
- This Shit Is Genius (No Idea Records, 1999)
- This Shit Is Geniuser (Anxious and Angry, 2025)

=== EPs ===
- Higher Aspirations: Tempered and Dismantled (Cerebellum Records, 1995)
- The Kids Are All Dead (Cerebellum Records, 1996)
- More Songs About Girlfriends and Bubblegum (Mutant Pop Records, 1997)
- D4! The Bootleg (Chadwick Records, 2010)

=== Split releases ===
- The Rebel's Choice (split with The Strike) (THD Records, 1997)
- Dillinger Four / Pinhead Gunpowder (Adeline Records, 2000)
- Masters of War (credited as "Dylanger Four") with Brother Mark Treehouse and Atmosphere (2004)

=== Compilation appearances ===
- "Farts are Jazz to Assholes" on Short Music for Short People (1999)
- "Our Science is Tight" and "Maximum Piss and Vinegar" on Hopelessly Devoted to You Vol. 3 (2000)
- "Like Sprewells on a Wheelchair" on Rock Against Bush, Vol. 2 (2004)
- "No Voices In The Sky" (Motorhead) on Pop For Charity [2002]

== Videography ==
- Belt Fighting the Man (with Toys That Kill and Rivethead)
- Plea for Peace/Take Action Vol. 2

== In popular culture ==
In The Bear season 4 episode "Tonnato," Carmy (Jeremy Allen White) notices a poster in an unused bedroom at his mom's house for a 2007 show at the Note club in Wicker Park by Midwestern punk bands including Dillinger Four, and Chicago's the Brokedowns, and the Catburglars.
