= This Shit Is Genius =

Compilation album by Dillinger Four
- Released: December 13, 1999
- Recorded: February 1995–March 1997
- Genre: Punk rock
- Label: No Idea

Dillinger Four chronology
Midwestern Songs of the Americas (1998)	This Shit Is Genius (1999)	Versus God (2000)

This Shit Is Genius is a 1999 album by punk rock band Dillinger Four. It collects material recorded from 1995 to 1997 in their EPs of Higher Aspirations: Tempered and Dismantled, The Kids Are All Dead and The Rebel's Choice which is a split album with The Strike. In 2025, the album was reissued as This Shit Is Geniuser, which adds the More Songs About Girlfriends and Bubblegum EP.

== Track listing ==
1. "Shotgun Confessional"
2. "Unemployed"
3. "Smells Like OK Soda"
4. "One Trick Pony"
5. "Open and Shut"
6. "Sally MacLennane" (The Pogues)
7. "I Coulda Been a Contender"
8. "Hi-Pro Glow"
9. "Two Cents"
10. "He's a Shithead (Yeah, Yeah)"
11. "Holy Shit"
12. "Bite the Curb, Bite the Curb"
13. "You're Not Blank" (The Dils)
14. "Inquiring Minds (Should Read a Book)"
