= Louis McKee =

American poet

Louis McKee (July 31, 1951, Philadelphia, Pennsylvania – November 21, 2011) was an American poet and a fixture of the Philadelphia poetry scene from the early 1970s. He was the author of Schuylkill County (Wampeter, 1982), The True Speed of Things (Slash and Burn, 1984), and fourteen other collections. More recently, he published River Architecture: Poems from Here & There 1973-1993 (Cynic, 1999), Loose Change (Marsh River Editions, 2001), and a volume in the Pudding House Greatest Hits series. Gerald Stern called his work “heart-breaking” and “necessary,” while William Stafford has written, “Louis McKee makes me think of how much fun it was to put your hand out a car window and make the air carry you into quick adventures and curlicues. He is so adept at turning all kinds of sudden glimpses into good patterns.” Naomi Shihab Nye says, “Louis McKee is one of the truest hearts and voices in poetry we will ever be lucky to know.”

== 2006 ==
Near Occasions of Sin, a collection issued in 2006 by Cynic Press, has been praised by Brendan Kennelly: “I really admire, and like, deeply, Louis McKee’s poems. They have two qualities I love — clarity and candour. And they often tell stories even as they evoke mysteries of being. And they engage a great deal with people. “The Soldier,” for example, is stunning for its pure drama. Then, he is a moving, complex love-poet, at once passionate and reserved. McKee's poems are like flashes of spirit rooted in the body. He never hides behind, or in, obscurity. Near Occasions of Sin is utterly unpretentious because his genius (I think he has that) is so real; “I am content with this,” he says at the end of “Failed Haiku”, and this readiness to be himself, in all his complexity and simplicity, is, I think, the basis of the appeal of this most unusual and attractive book. Sometimes, McKee talks to his reader and it is like talking to a next-door neighbor (that's what I mean by candour in these poems). Also, they sound like songs at times—winged, humane, vulnerable.”

Philip Dacey, writing about McKee’s poetry in Schuylkill Valley Journal (#24, spring, 2007) says, “It is the essence of McKee’s work to be rich in artifice and craftsmanship and informed poetic strategies while at the same time consistently brave in its presentation of two confrontations: a person’s with himself and that person’s with the world outside himself. To read McKee is to witness drama and struggle; if the art is hard-won, the human victories are, too.”

== 2007 ==
Warren Woessner, in the American Book Review (Jan/Feb 2007, Vol 28, No. 2), wrote that McKee's poems have a “surprising honesty…. In this era of superconfessional hubris, we are told that no topic is off-limits, but, if this is so, why are so many of these poems startling? Picasso said, “art is not truth,” and I know that to be true, but it is important to the force of these poems that I can believe that the poet is giving us his stories straight up.”

McKee was a longtime editor of the Painted Bride Quarterly. During his tenure, he edited three special issues, celebrating the work of Etheridge Knight and John Logan, as well as a retrospective, 20th-anniversary volume of the PBQ. He operated Banshee Press and edited the magazine One Trick Pony until its demise in 2007.

== Bibliography ==
- Schuylkill County (Wampeter Press, Green Harbor, MA 1982)
- The True Speed of Things (Slash and Burn Press, Philadelphia, PA 1984) (Reprinted: Nightshade Press, Troy, ME 1986)
- Safe Water (Slash and Burn Press, Philadelphia, PA 1986)
- No Matter (Pig In a Poke Press, Pittsburgh, PA 1987)
- Oranges (M.A.F. Press, Portlandville, NY 1989)
- Angelus –a broadside issue (Lilliput Review, Pittsburgh, PA 1990)
- Three Poems –a chapbook (Verse Press, Narberth, PA 1993)
- Last Seen –a pamphlet (Red Pagoda Press, Reading, PA 1999)
- River Architecture: Poems From Here & There: A Selected Poems 1973-1993 (Cynic Press, Philadelphia, PA 1999)
- Right as Rain (Nova House Press, Rosemont, PA 2000)
- Loose Change (Marsh River Editions, Marshfield, WI 2001)
- Greatest Hits 1971-2001 (Pudding House Press, Johnstown, OH 2002)
- Near Occasions of Sin (Cynic Press, Philadelphia, PA 2006)
- Marginalia (Translations from the Old Irish) (Adastra Press, Easthampton, MA 2008)
- Still Life (Foothills, Kanona, NY, 2008)
- Jamming (The League of Laboring Poets, San Clemente, CA, 2008)
- No Matter (Number Five. The Rebound Series. Seven Kitchens Press: http://sevenkitchenspress.com 2011)

=== As editor ===
- Etheridge Knight: A Celebration (A special issue of the Painted Bride Quarterly—PBQ, Philadelphia, PA 1988)
- John Logan (A special issue of the Painted Bride Quarterly—PBQ, Philadelphia, PA 1990)
- PBQ: A Poetry Retrospective 1973-1993 (A special issue of the Painted Bride Quarterly—PBQ, Philadelphia, PA 1993)
