= Triple Rock Social Club =

Former music venue and restaurant in Minneapolis, Minnesota

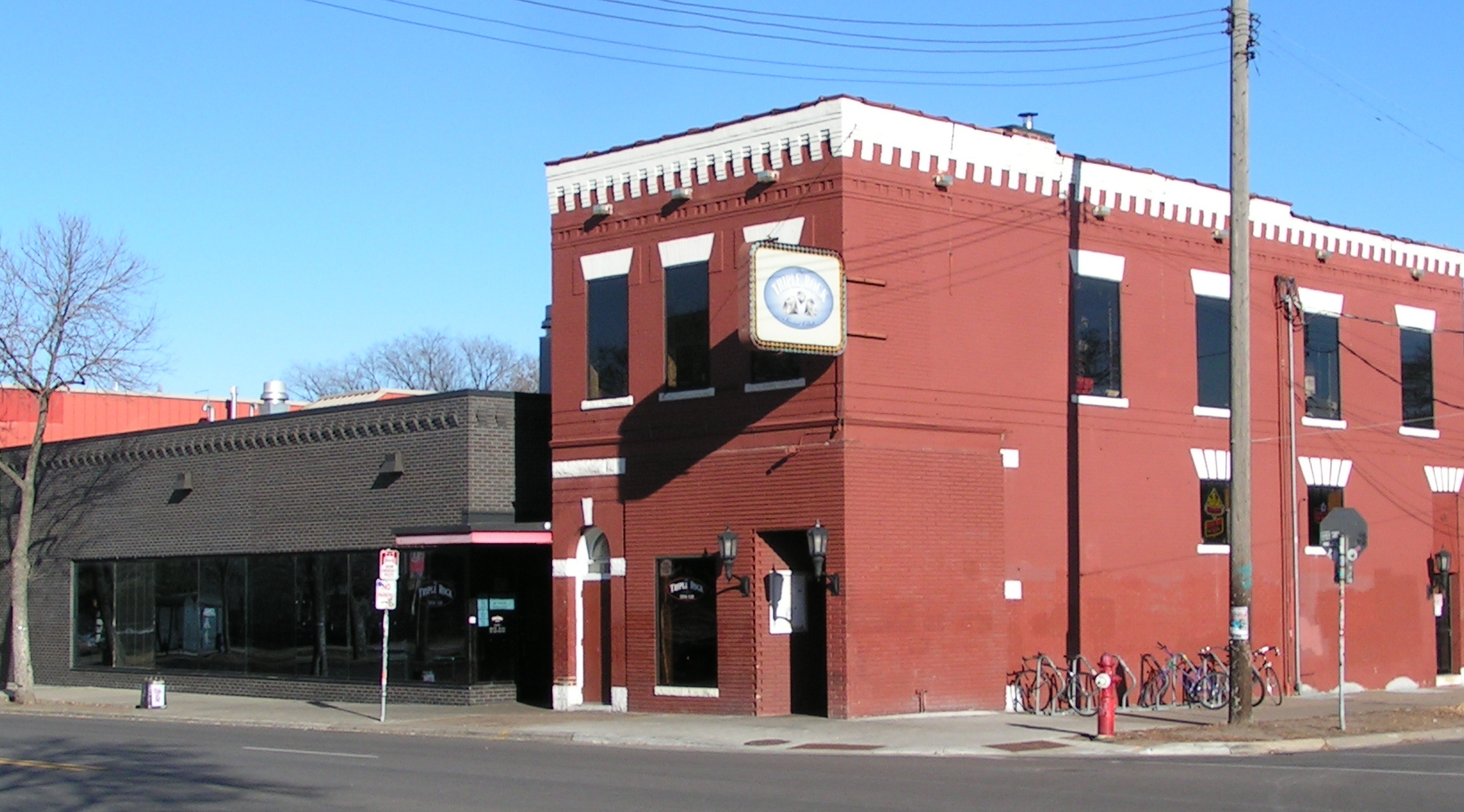
- Interactive map of Triple Rock Social Club
- Address: 629 Cedar Avenue
- Location: Minneapolis, Minnesota
- Coordinates: 44°58′0.51″N 93°14′49.46″W
- Type: Nightclub/tavern

Construction
- Opened: December 4th, 1998
- Closed: November 22, 2017

The Triple Rock Social Club was a bar, music venue, and restaurant in Minneapolis, Minnesota, United States, co-owned by Gretchen Funk and Erik Funk of the punk band Dillinger Four.

The club is mentioned in the Motion City Soundtrack song "Better Open the Door", as the "T-Rock" in the Doomtree song "Bangarang", and in the Limbeck song "Home Is Where The Van Is." The Bomb the Music Industry! four-part song "King of Minneapolis" is based on a night spent at the club by vocalist/guitarist Jeff Rosenstock. It is featured in the song "Seeing Double At The Triple Rock" by NOFX; the video for the song was shot at the club.

The bar first opened in 1998. It sold foreign and independently brewed beers and offered vegetarian/vegan dishes in addition to standard bar fare. The venue portion of the club opened in June 2003, with Lifter Puller reuniting for the first three shows. The Triple Rock was a common venue for local and up-and-coming bands to play. Nationally known bands also played at the club.

The name of the club was taken from the 1980 film The Blues Brothers. The Triple Rock Baptist Church (whose pastor is James Brown) is the site where the brothers receive their "mission from God".

On October 16, 2017, the club announced it would be closing its doors on November 22, 2017. The final show at the Triple Rock occurred on November 21, headlined by Negative Approach and Dillinger Four.
