= Kirino (disambiguation) =

Quirino, or Kirino, is a province in the Philippines.

Kirino may also refer to:

== People ==
- Miyu Kirino, member of the Japanese idol girl group Niji no Conquistador
- Natsuo Kirino (born 1951), Japanese novelist
- Kirino Toshiaki (1838–1877), Japanese samurai and an Imperial Japanese Army general

== Character ==
=== Surname ===
- Ami Kirino, a character from the Japanese manga series Place to Place
- Hayate Kirino, a character from the Japanese manga series Igano Kabamaru
- Ichika Kirino, a character from the Japanese tokusatsu drama Ultraman Decker
- Makoto Kirino, a character from the Japanese manga series Smells Like Green Spirit
- Ranmaru Kirino, a from Inazuma Eleven GO; see Inazuma Eleven GO (season 1)
- Shunpei Kirino, a character from the Japanese tokusatsu television series Chouriki Sentai Ohranger

=== Given name ===
- Kirino Chiba, a character from the manga/anime Bamboo Blade
- Kirino Kosaka, a character from the Japanese light novel series Oreimo
- Kirino Konosaka, a character from the 2005 video game Gift

== See also ==
- Kirin (disambiguation)
- Quirino (disambiguation)
