= The Soviettes =

Minnesotan punk rock band, formed 2001

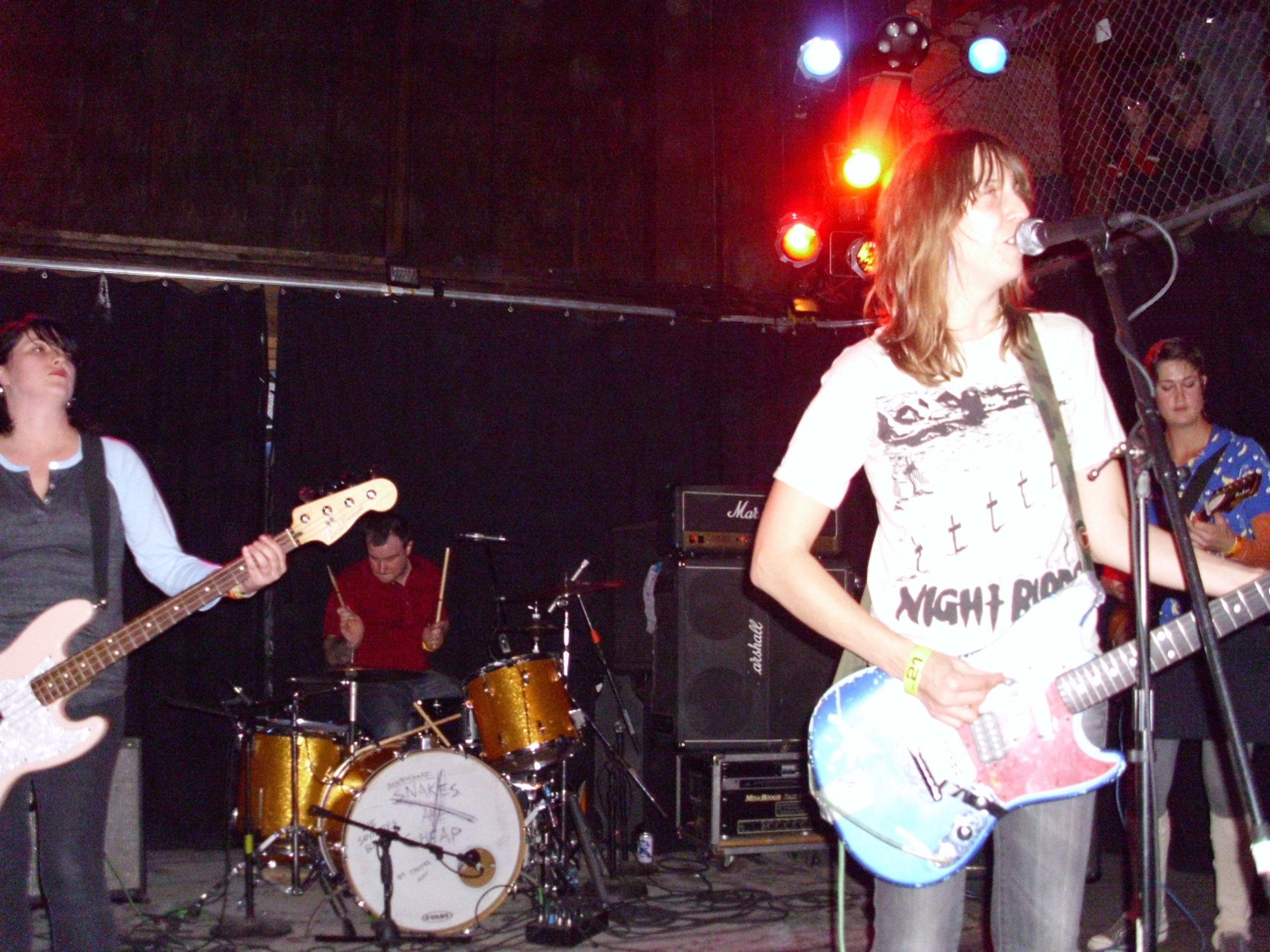
- The Soviettes playing a reunion show in 2010. Left to right: Susy, Danny, Annie, Sturgeon.

Background information
- Origin: Minneapolis, Minnesota, United States
- Genres: Punk rock; pop-punk
- Years active: 2001–2006; 2010-2011
- Labels: Adeline; Fat Wreck Chords; Dirtnap; Crustacean; Pop Riot
- Members: Annie "Sparrows" Holoien; Susy Sharp; Maren "Sturgeon" Macosko; Danny Henry
- Past members: Mikey "Erg" Yannich; Lane Pederson
- Website: The Soviettes on Facebook

The Soviettes were a punk rock band from Minneapolis, Minnesota, founded in 2001. The group is composed of Annie Sparrows (guitar), Maren "Sturgeon" Macosko (guitar), Susy Sharp (bass guitar), and Danny Henry (drums), all of whom share singing and songwriting duties.

== History ==
Annie, originally from Fargo, North Dakota, met Sturgeon when she moved to Minneapolis in 1995. They started writing songs in 2001 and were joined by Susy shortly afterward with Lane Pederson on drums. The name originates from when Annie was serving coffee at a previous job, a customer offered "your band should be called The Soviettes" instead of a tip. The band recorded their first EP, T.C.C.P., the same year. Soon Annie asked Danny to play with them permanently.

In 2003, The Soviettes released the first LP entitled LP on Adeline Records of Oakland, California.

In 2004, the band released their second LP entitled LP II, again on Adeline Records. The band was then noticed by Fat Wreck Chords in San Francisco, California and was shortly after signed with the label. The band released the song "Paranoia! Cha-Cha-Cha" for the compilation album Rock Against Bush, Vol. 1.

On June 28, 2005, the band's third LP entitled LP III was released on Fat Wreck Chords.

The members of The Soviettes had an association with the Minnesota RollerGirls with the single "Roller Girls" about the organization with backing vocals from some of the girls.

They toured the United States extensively. Their final tour was a 50 state tour at the end of 2005 with Fat Wreck label-mates Against Me!, the Epoxies, and Smoke or Fire.

=== Breakup ===
In 2006 the band went on hiatus indefinitely. "I don't know why we broke up," said Danny Henry in 2007, "It was pretty natural. Bands are relationships, they're just more complicated because it's a four-way deal."

Since The Soviettes' hiatus, Annie and Danny have continued playing music together as the punk rock duo The Awesome Snakes and later in Green/Blue. Sturgeon played in The Gateway District with Carrie (who also played with Sturgeon in The Salteens), as well as Nate from Banner Pilot and Brad from Dear Landlord (both of whom also played in Rivethead), and later formed Partial Traces also with Brad and Nate. Annie also performs with Panel, Bermuda Squares and the God Damn Doo Wop Band, and sometimes performs with Sturgeon in Partial Traces.

In 2019, the online magazine Consequence named the Soviettes No. 93 on its list of the best 100 pop-punk bands of all time.

=== Reunions ===
The band reunited in 2010 for some shows. The first was on March 18, 2010, at Eclipse Records in Saint Paul, Minnesota. Next was March 19, 2010, at the Turf Club in Saint Paul. Both shows were record release shows for their Rarities album, released for free on Red Sound Records. They played at the Soda Bar in San Diego, California, on September 4, 2010, as part of Awesome Fest 4.

On October 29, 2010 the band played at The Atlantic in Gainesville, FLorida, as part of Fest 9. The band played two more shows in 2010, one at the Triple Rock Social Club, Minneapolis, Minnesota, on November 12, 2010, and another at Reggie's Rock Club, Chicago, Illinois, on November 13, 2010, the latter opening for the Methadones on their final show.

The band was scheduled to participate in Weasel Fest, supporting Screeching Weasel at Reggie's Rock Club on May 29, 2011, but they dropped off the bill following Ben Weasel's behavior at SXSW 2011. They did play at the Triple Rock Social Club in Minneapolis on May 27, 2011. The band played a live show at San Francisco's Bottom of the Hill Club on August 31, 2011.

== Members ==
ANNIE plays guitar
STURGEON plays guitar
DANNY plays drums
SUSY plays bass
everybody sings

— The Soviettes, LP II liner notes (2004)

Current members

- Annie Sparrows - guitar, vocals
- Susy Sharp - bass, vocals
- Maren "Sturgeon" Macosko - guitar, vocals
- Danny Henry - drums, vocals

Past members

- Lane Pederson - drums
- Mikey "Erg" Yannich - drums, vocals

== Discography ==
=== Albums ===
Title	Release date	Notes	Label
LP	17 June 2003	Rereleased on vinyl in 2005 by Crustacean Records.	Adeline
LP II	13 April 2004	Vinyl released by Learning Curve Records later that year.	Adeline
LP III	28 June 2005	220 albums released on pink vinyl.	Fat Wreck Chords
Rarities	16 March 2010	A collection of b-sides and rarities	Red Sound Records

=== EPs and singles ===
Title	Release date	Notes	Label
T.C.C.P.	11 May 2002	Released as a 7" vinyl only.	Pop Riot
"Alright"	12 October 2004	B-side: "Plus One"	Dirtnap
"Roller Girls"	23 August 2005	B-side: "Say So"	Fat Wreck Chords

=== Splits ===
Title	Release date	Notes	Label
The Soviettes/Valentines EP	5 November 2002		Pop Riot
The Havenot's/The Soviettes	2003	As both a four track vinyl distributed in the US and a six track CD released only in Japan on Star Jets Records	Nice & Neat

=== Compilations ===
Title	Release date	Soviettes Tracks	Label
No Hold Back... All Attack!!!	2002	Twin Cities Sound	Havoc Records and Distribution
Rock Against Bush, Vol. 1	04/20/2004	¡Paranoia! Cha-Cha-Cha	Fat Wreck Chords
Protect: A Benefit for ...	10/18/2005	Middle of the Night	Fat Wreck Chords
21st Century Power Pop Riot	06/06/2006	Goodbye to You (vocal by Annie)	Red Scare Industries

== Reception ==
- "The Minneapolis quartet make songs that are loud, raw and clock in at under 2 minutes. They punch you in the gut and make you feel happy for the pain." (Rod Harmon, Sarasota Herald-Tribune)
- "Every song on LP III is under three minutes long and recalls the upbeat antics of the Ramones and, more recently, the Donnas." (Jessica Grose, SPIN)
- "The Soviettes are an instant party, and the second they hit the stage you've received your invitation. You can't help but get caught up in their immediate infectious energy." (Jason White, Thrasher)
