= Kylin =

Kylin may refer to:

- Qilin or Kylin, a mythical creature known in various East Asian cultures
- Kylin (operating system), a Chinese operating system
- Apache Kylin, an open-source distributed analytics engine
- Kylin Villa, a place near University Town of Shenzhen, Guangdong, China
- Bayi Kylin, a professional basketball team in Women's Chinese Basketball Association
- Shaanxi Gaitianli Kylins, a defunct professional basketball team in the Chinese Basketball Association
- Kylin TV, an internet television channel owned by Phoenix North America Chinese Channel
- Kylin, a model of Mitsubishi pickups by Changfeng Motor

== People with the surname ==
- Ann-Sofie Kylin (born 1955), Swedish actress starring in the 1970 film A Swedish Love Story
- Johann Harald Kylin (1879-1949), Swedish botanist

== See also ==
- Kirin (disambiguation)
- Qilin (disambiguation)
