= Crustacean Records =

- Founded: 1994
- Founder: Chris Langkamp
- Genre: Indie rock
- Country of origin: U.S.
- Location: Madison, Wisconsin, U.S.
- Official website: crustaceanrecords.com

Crustacean Records is an independent record label in Wisconsin, United States, that was founded in 1994.

== History ==
The label was founded by Chris Langkamp. Chris Langkamp is majority owner and Rory Nienajadlo is co-owner. The debut release was Fetus by Crab Shack, the band Chris Langkamp played bass with, and was cassette only. The second release, issued on compact disc, was the first Crustacean Records compilation featuring Helena Handbasket, Gethsemane, Crab Shack, Front of Trucker, Mas Optica, and Wet Dog. The label grew in the mid and late 1990s with notable mainstays of the label being Mad Trucker Gone Mad, Big Big Furnace, Brainerd, and System & Station.

The roster includes The Awesome Snakes, Birthday Suits, Bloodcow, Droids Attack, Drunk Drivers, Fuck Knights, The Giraffes, The Gusto, The Pimps, Imperial Battlesnake, Killdozer, Ouija Radio, Screamin' Cyn Cyn & The Pons, The Skintones, The Skullcranes, 20 Dollar Love, Things Fall Apart, and The Von Ehrics. Past notable artists include Carl, You Know Peggy, The Soviettes, 26 (Doc Corbin Dart), Mucky Pup, John Kruth, Hazard County Girls, Modern Machines, Peelander-Z, and Rocket Fuel Is the Key.

In a review of the label's Crust-o-Matic label compilation, In Music We Trust's Jeb Branin wrote "Crustacean has a knack for signing bands that rock the universe but are in no way cliché or mundane. Anything and everything they touch is unique and noteworthy". In a 2008 cover story by Madison free alternative weekly paper The Isthmus, Rich Albertoni summed up Crustacean's effect on the Wisconsin rock scene by saying, "It's history because Crustacean has gone on to assemble one of the richest archives of Wisconsin rock over the past 10 years. The label's catalogue now includes more than 70 releases, mostly from bands originating in Madison, Milwaukee and the Fox River Valley."

In August and December 2007, the label filmed ten of their acts performing at the High Noon Saloon, to be released on DVD in July 2008. On March 13, 2008 Crustacean Record had its inaugural South by Southwest showcase in Austin, Texas at the Molotov Lounge as well as participating in the 2008 Indie Village as part of the trade show in the Austin convention center.
