= Glory Daze (film) =

- Theatrical poster
- Directed by: Rich Wilkes
- Written by: Rich Wilkes
- Produced by: Michael Scott BloomRobot in the FamilyChris J. Slater (co-producer)
- Starring: Ben Affleck; Sam Rockwell; Megan Ward; French Stewart
- Cinematography: Christopher Taylor
- Edited by: Richard Candib
- Music by: Warren Fitzgerald
- Production company: Seventh Art Productions
- Distributed by: Fusion Studios, Inc.; Woodward Productions; Weiny Bro Productions
- Release dates: October 1, 1995 (Hamptons International Film Festival); September 27, 1996 (theatrical)
- Running time: 100 minutes
- Country: United States
- Language: English
- Box office: $15,134

Glory Daze is a 1995 American independent comedy film written and directed by Rich Wilkes and starring Ben Affleck, Sam Rockwell, Megan Ward, and French Stewart. It also features John Rhys-Davies, Alyssa Milano, and Spalding Gray in supporting roles. The plot concerns five college housemates in Santa Cruz, California who are facing graduation and make an attempt to prolong their carefree lifestyle before going their separate ways. Matthew McConaughey, Meredith Salenger, Matt Damon, Brendan Fraser, and Leah Remini all appear in minor roles. Music for the film was composed and selected by members of the punk rock band The Vandals, and the soundtrack features several punk rock bands of the era.

== Plot ==
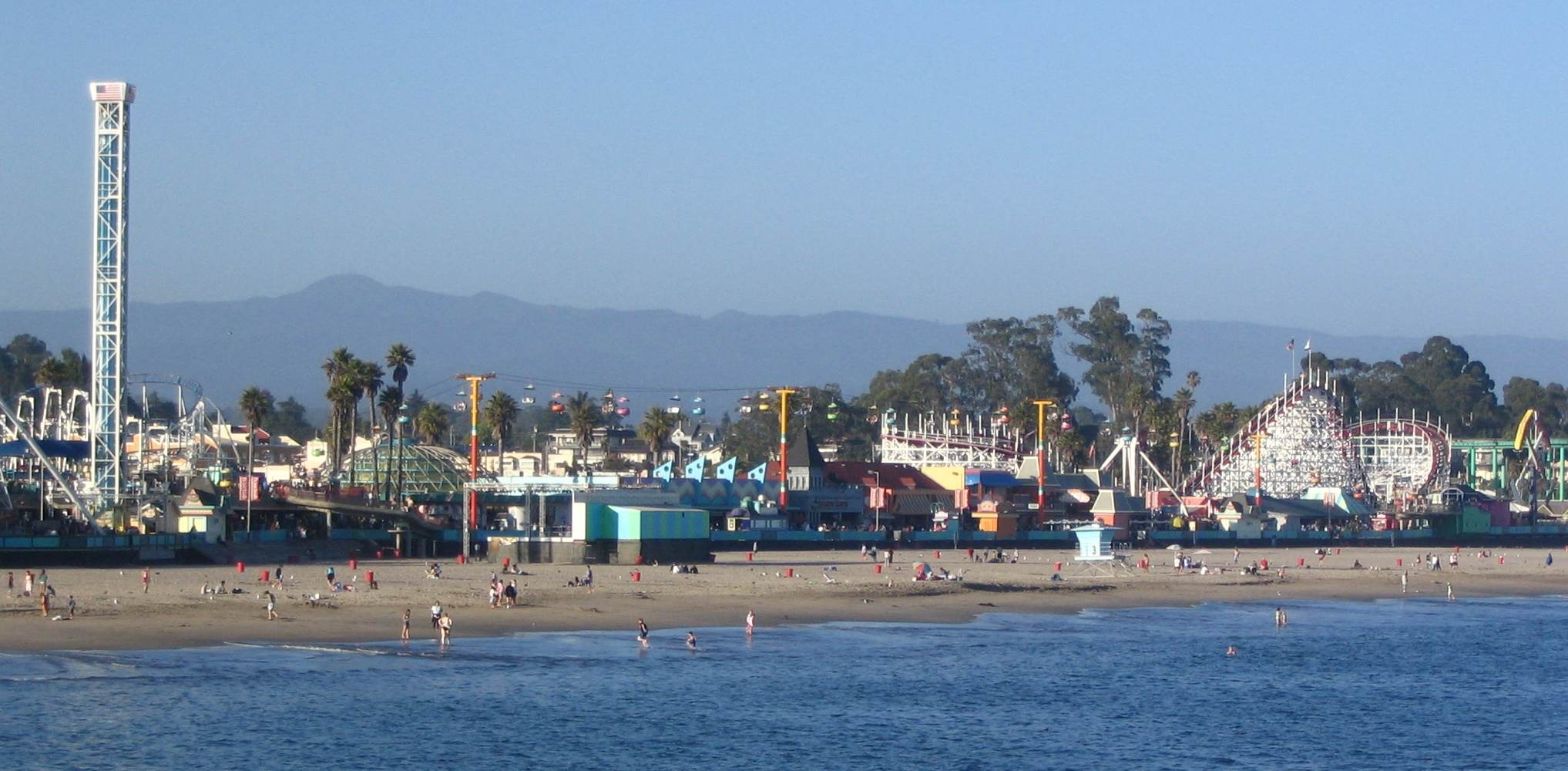
A scene early in the film was shot at the Santa Cruz Beach Boardwalk, with the actors riding various attractions.

22 year-old Jack Freeman is graduating from the University of California, Santa Cruz with a degree in art, and is hurting from a recent breakup with his ex-girlfriend Dina. He shares a house called "El Rancho" with four friends: Rob is also graduating, and preparing to move to Los Angeles with his girlfriend Joanie, though he is worried about settling down and living so close to Joani's mother. Dennis is a perpetual student with three degrees who, after six years at UCSC, is moving on to an MBA program in Michigan. Mickey is a cartoonist with a year of college still to go, and has feelings for their friend Chelsea but is too shy to reciprocate her affections. Josh, aka "Slosh", had a promising academic future but failed out of college in favor of a life of drinking and working a series of menial jobs.

Art professor Luther criticizes Jack's final sculpture project for expressing an uninteresting, suburban, middle-class worldview, but praises Dennis' thesis—a photo-essay of Slosh getting drunk and working at dead-end jobs—and offers him an apprenticeship; Jack suggests that this is only because Luther has a homosexual attraction toward Dennis, a notion Dennis dismisses. Not wanting their college days to end, Jack convinces his friends to postpone their respective plans and stay at El Rancho for another year. They celebrate the decision by throwing a party, at which Chelsea, tired of her feelings for Mickey going unrequited, makes sexual advances toward Jack. He turns her down, and she leaves the party embarrassed. Rob gets into an argument with Joanie, causing her to leave angrily.

After the commencement ceremony the next day, Rob reconciles with Joanie and meets her mother, and they end up getting along. Jack argues with his parents over his future, and they leave abruptly. Jack encourages Mickey to pursue a relationship with Chelsea. Luther makes a pass at Dennis during a faculty luncheon, confirming Jack's suspicion about his ulterior motives. Dennis and Jack vent their frustrations with Luther by cutting down a totem pole that his sculpture students spent two semesters creating.

At a beach bonfire that night, Slosh tells Jack that it was Jack's carefree attitude that inspired him to give up on college, and that he does not regret his decision because he no longer fears what the future may hold. At Slosh's encouragement, Jack attempts to win back Dina, but she rebuffs him. Back at El Rancho, Mickey admits his feelings to Chelsea, and the two share a kiss. Jack and the others realize that they should not really stay another year, that it is time to move on with their adult lives. To preserve their memories of the house and prevent any future residents from despoiling it, they proceed to smash their furniture and belongings, culminating in the destruction of the bar counter that they had built together.

The next day, the five friends go their separate ways: Rob leaves for Los Angeles with Joanie, Dennis heads off to school in Michigan, and Mickey and Chelsea begin dating. Slosh moves in with a group of new students he has befriended, and hangs the El Rancho sign on their house. As Jack leaves town, he stops at a restaurant where Dina is eating with her new boyfriend, and writes "angst for the memories" on the window as a farewell message to her.

== Cast ==
- Ben Affleck as Jack Freeman, the film's main character, who is graduating from the University of California, Santa Cruz and lives at "El Rancho" with his friends
- Sam Rockwell as Rob, one of the El Rancho housemates, who is also graduating
- Megan Ward as Joanie, Rob's girlfriend, also graduating
- French Stewart as Dennis, an El Rancho housemate and perpetual student who has spent six years in college and earned three degrees
- Kristin Bauer as Dina, Jack's ex-girlfriend
- Vinnie DeRamus as Mickey, an El Rancho housemate and cartoonist for the local newspaper
- Vien Hong as Josh, nicknamed "Slosh", an El Rancho housemate and college dropout
- Mary Woronov as Vicki, Joanie's mother
- Elizabeth Ruscio as Jack's mother
- John Rhys-Davies as Luther, an art professor who Jack and Dennis study under
- Alyssa Milano as Chelsea, a friend of the El Rancho gang who has a crush on Mickey
- Spalding Gray as Jack's father

Affleck, Rockwell, Ward, and Stewart received top billing for the film, both in the billing block and opening credits, while Rhys-Davies, Milano, and Gray are listed as "special appearances". The theatrical film poster, however, advertised Affleck, Milano, and Stewart as the film's stars. Meredith Salenger is also credited with a "special appearance" as a fan of Mickey's comic strip. Several actors who later became stars in their own right had small roles in Glory Daze, including Matthew McConaughey as a rental truck salesman, Matt Damon in a non-speaking role as former El Rancho housemate Edgar Pudwhacker, and Brendan Fraser and Leah Remini as a couple who Jack argues with on a bus. Other small roles were played by Sean Whalen as a flunky, Jay Lacopo as the bus driver, and Alfred Sole as a fisherman.

== Music ==
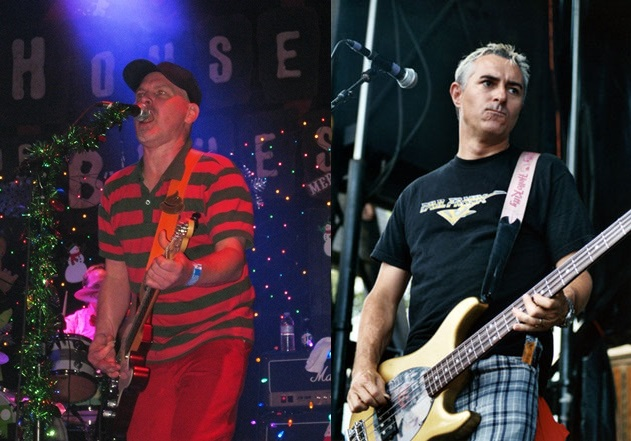
Warren Fitzgerald (left) of The Vandals composed the score for Glory Daze. His bandmate Joe Escalante (right) supervised the music. They released the soundtrack album through their record label, Kung Fu Records.

The musical score for the film's soundtrack was composed by Warren Fitzgerald, guitarist of the punk rock band The Vandals. Vandals bassist Joe Escalante served as music supervisor, along with Lia Vollack. The Vandals performed original music for the film score, including the "Theme from Glory Daze" which plays during the opening credits. "It's a Fact", from their then-upcoming album The Quickening, was included, and a music video was later released for the song featuring clips from the film. The soundtrack also features several other contemporary punk rock bands, mostly from California, including NOFX, Bad Religion, Tilt, The Mr. T Experience, Assorted Jelly Beans, The Bouncing Souls, and the New Bomb Turks.

Members of the cast and crew also contributed to the soundtrack. The song "Sports Pack" is sung by Vinnie DeRamus, who played Mickey, with writer and director Rich Wilkes on drums along with bassist Scott Marcano and a guitarist credited as "Gold"; for the soundtrack album they used the group name Epoxy. In the film's party scene, the El Rancho housemates' band perform two songs: The "Dudes of Steel Theme" with Rob singing, and a cover version of The Mr. T Experience's "Now We Are Twenty-One" with Slosh singing. Sam Rockwell and Vien Hong sang their respective characters' parts on these tracks (DeRamus also sang backing vocals on "Now We Are Twenty-One"), while the music was performed by Daniel Rey, Roger Murdock, and John Connor.

=== Soundtrack album ===
Glory Daze: Original Motion Picture Soundtrack

Soundtrack album
- Released: September 17, 1996
- Genres: Punk rock, ska
- Label: Kung Fu (78761)

The soundtrack album for Glory Daze was released by Kung Fu Records, Escalante and Fitzgerald's recently launched independent record label. The album includes two songs not used in the film: "Joe Lies (When He Cries)" by The Bouncing Souls, and the previously unreleased Vandals song "Change the World with My Hockey Stick". Also, rather than the original Bad Religion version of "We're Only Gonna Die" used in the film, the album substitutes a live recording of a cover version performed by Sublime. Other songs used in the film but not included on the soundtrack album include "Kill All the White Man" by NOFX, "Clown Show" by Ednaswap, "She Ballin'" by Chappie Chap, and "Acetone" by Mudhoney.

==== Track listing ====
No.	Title	Writer(s)	Artist	Length
1.	"Theme from Glory Daze"	Warren Fitzgerald	The Vandals	1:26
2.	"It's a Fact" (from The Quickening, 1996)	Fitzgerald	The Vandals	2:05
3.	"Change the World with My Hockey Stick"	Fitzgerald	The Vandals	2:24
4.	"Here We Go" (from Maniacal Laughter, 1996)	Pete Steinkopf, Shal Khichi, Bryan Keinlen, Greg Attonito	The Bouncing Souls	1:59
5.	"Joe Lies (When He Cries)" (from The Argyle E.P., 1993)	Steinkopf, Khichi, Keinlen, Attonito	The Bouncing Souls	3:51
6.	"I Just Wanna Do It with You" (from Love Is Dead, 1996)	Frank Portman	The Mr. T Experience	1:59
7.	"Please Stop Fucking My Mom" (from Fuck the Kids, 1996)	Fat Mike	NOFX	1:00
8.	"Even Hitler Had a Girlfriend" (from Our Bodies Our Selves, 1993)	Portman	The Mr. T Experience	2:27
9.	"Brain Dead" (from Assorted Jelly Beans, 1996)	Richard Falomir, Ricky Boyer, Wylie Johnson	Assorted Jelly Beans	2:39
10.	"Sports Pack"	Rich Wilkes, Scott Marcano	Epoxy	1:29
11.	"Country Time" (from Scientific, 1996)	Deston Berry	Hepcat	3:17
12.	"Crying Jag" (from Play Cell, 1993)	Cinder Block, Jeffrey Bischoff, Vincent Camacho, Pete Rypins	Tilt	2:27
13.	"Baby" (from The Billy Nayer Show, 1994)	Cory McAbee	The Billy Nayer Show	1:34
14.	"Runnin' on Go" (from !!Destroy-Oh-Boy!!, 1993)	Eric Davidson, Jim Weber, Matt Reber, Bill Randt	New Bomb Turks	2:10
15.	"The Moron Brothers" (from Ribbed, 1991)	Fat Mike	NOFX	2:27
16.	"Berkeley Pier" (from ''Til It Kills, 1995)	Block, Bischoff, Camacho, Gabe Meline	Tilt	3:45
17.	"We're Only Gonna Die" (live; originally performed by Bad Religion)	Greg Graffin	Sublime	3:20

== Reception ==
Reviewing the film in November 1995, when it was titled Last Call, Variety senior critic Emanuel Levy criticized Wilkes' direction as "awkward, lacking any visual flair" and said that "the movie makes its funny points early on, which means the second half is basically an elaboration. If the loose, anecdotal pic sometimes rambles and loses its main line, eventually it rights itself, with enough inventiveness and fresh, nasty humor to compensate for the dull moments." Upon its theatrical release, Stephen Holden of The New York Times gave Glory Daze a positive review, saying "This tiny nostalgic comedy, with its smart collegiate chatter, is a much better movie than slick fatuities like The Jerky Boys (1995), Airheads (1994), and Billy Madison (1995), for which Mr. Wilkes wrote the screenplays. Of course that isn't saying much. But Glory Daze deftly sketches each member of its underachieving fivesome while sustaining a mood of humorously frazzled end-of-semester anxiety [...] Mr. Affleck's affably mopey performance finds just the right balance between obnoxious and sad sack. Even though he thoroughly deserves every comeuppance, you still have to sympathize with the poor guy."

Edward Guthmann of the San Francisco Chronicle gave the film a negative review, saying that it "doesn't cover any ground that wasn't already plowed and sprayed in previous slacker comedies" and that "there's no shape to the movie and no rhythm connecting the scenes to each other. Wilkes has a gift for nasty put-down lines, but his directing debut lacks heart and his leading man isn't a tad sympathetic – or even slightly redeemed by Affleck's sour performance." Barbara Shulgasser of The San Francisco Examiner was also critical of it, calling it "another cynical movie about people in their 20s who don't know what to do with their lives [...] Writer-director Rich Wilkes doesn't insert much substance into the movie, but he does take the opportunity to make fun of art education. Jack's professor (John Rhys-Davies) tells him Jack's project has gotten 'lost in abstractionism'. 'Real art is subject to a complex filtration system', he goes on. 'I look at your stuff and I see 20th century American suburbia. It doesn't resonate.' Just the way I feel about this movie." Joey O'Bryan of The Austin Chronicle also criticized Glory Daze, calling it "insipid [...] a loving, if not particularly funny, tribute to the slob-comedies of the Eighties, or, in other words, it's an Animal House (1978) wannabe with a condescending Gen-X slant [...] the film's sense of social satire is hopelessly pedestrian, the dialogue stale ('He changed his major more often than his underwear'), and the editing is amateurish, with many scenes beginning too late and ending too early."

Reviewing the DVD release of the film in 2002, Keith Phipps of The A.V. Club compared it unfavorably to 1995's Kicking and Screaming, calling it "a considerably weaker variation on the same themes [...] Glory Daze is not a good movie, but it does illustrate some of the frustrating clichés that the Gen Angst genre has accumulated in the nearly four years since Reality Bites (1994) appeared."
