= Creepy (band) =

San Francisco, California-based indie rock/pop punk band

- Origin: San Francisco, California
- Genre: indie rock/pop punk
- Years active: 2002–present
- Label: Teeno Records
- Members: Danny Cole (vocals/guitar); Johnny Bananas (bass); Adam Grant (drums); Emy D (synth)
- Past members: Dave Chavez (bass)
- Website: www.myspace.com/creepy

Creepy is a San Francisco, California-based indie rock/pop punk band that formed in 2002.

== The Triple EP and Strong Lies Kill Highs ==
In 2007, the group released a full-length CD entitled "The Triple EP" which was a collection of music from three previously unreleased EP length CDs.

The Triple EP received positive reviews by many critics of independent music because of its illustration of progress as the band evolved their unique sound over the 2003-2007 period. The Triple EP also received radio play on several college and independent music radio showcases.

The band released their fourth EP in 2009 entitled, Strong Lies Kill Highs. It was announced in January 2009 in a blog on Creepy's Myspace that they plan to tour in March and April in support of their newly released EP.

== Associated acts ==
Notably, the original bass guitar player was Dave Chavez from hardcore bands Verbal Abuse and Code of Honor. Adam Grant was also the drummer for hardcore bands Retching Red, featuring Cinder Block (formerly of Tilt), and Oppressed Logic.

== Discography ==
2003 Hungry Like The Wolf EP: 1. Powerless; 2. Blitzwing; 3. Lamewad; 4. Teenage Burnout; 5. Bombshell	2005 The Gloom EP: 1. Delay; 2. Rise Of Revenge; 3. Burn Me; 4. Renegade; 5. Out Of Sight Out Of Mind	2007 The Triple EP: 1. The Lost; 2. You're Dead; 3. Torn To Zero	2009 Strong Lies Kill Highs: 1. Side Unseen; 2. Approach is Order; 3. Strange Days; 4. Bleed Dry; 5. Narko Darko; 6. Uncommon

- "Hungry Like The Wolf EP" (2003/Teeno, mixed by Ryan Greene)
- "The Gloom EP" (2005/Teeno, recorded/mixed/produced by Adam Krammer at Motor Studio SF)
- "The Triple EP" (2007/Teeno, recorded/mixed/produced by Scott Llamas at Popsmear)
- "Strong Lies Kill Highs (2009/Teeno, recorded/mixed/produced by Scott Llamas at Popsmear, mastered by Steve Hall at Future Disk)
