= You're Dead =

You're Dead may refer to:

== Books ==
- You're Dead, Resolved – Horror High series novel by Nicholas Adams, 1993

== Film ==
- You're Dead (film), a 1999 film with Rhys Ifans and John Hurt

== Music ==
- You're Dead!, album by electronic musician Flying Lotus, 2014

=== Songs ===
- "You're Dead", song by The Varukers, 1984
- "You're Dead", song by Alkaline Trio from the album From Here to Infirmary, 2001
- "You're Dead", song by Die Toten Hosen from the album Unsterblich, 2001
- "You're Dead", song by the Wedding Present from the album Valentina, 2012
- "You're Dead", song by Megadeth from the album United Abominations, 2007
- "You're Dead", song by Necro (rapper)
- "You're Dead", song by Norma Tanega
- "You're Dead", song by Creepy (band), 2007
- "Jack, You're Dead!" by Louis Jordan, 2007

== See also ==
- a commonly used parting phrase
- Game over, an English phrase for some video games
