= Been Where? Did What? =

Compilation album by Tilt
- Released: November 6, 2001
- Recorded: March, 1992 – April, 1999
- Genre: Punk rock
- Length: 46:03
- Label: Fat Wreck Chords

Tilt chronology
Viewers Like You (1999)	Been Where? Did What? (2001)

Professional ratings
Review scores
Source	Rating
AllMusic	2/5 stars
Punknews.org	4/5 stars

Been Where? Did What? is an album by Californian punk rock band Tilt. It was released in November 2001 on Fat Wreck Chords. It consists of previously unreleased tracks and cover versions, recorded by the band between 1992 and 1999.

== Track listing ==
- All songs written by Tilt, unless otherwise stated.
1. "White Homes" – 2:10
2. "Addiction" – 2:12
3. "Nuthin' from You" – 2:19
4. "Crying Jag" – 2:26
5. "Dead Bum" – 2:27
6. "Come Across" – 2:32
7. "Unlucky Lounge" – 2:12
8. "Loyalty" – 1:56
9. "Worse to Bad" – 2:02
10. "Can't Listen" – 2:01
11. "Berkeley Pier" – 3:13
12. "Fuck Up" – 1:01
13. "Vendorhead" – 1:54
14. "Pfeifernuzen Revisited" – 1:48
15. "Not Going Anywhere" – 1:54
16. "Where in the World Is Carmen Sandiego" (Altman, Yazbek) – 2:22
17. "Theme from the Dukes of Hazzard (Good Ol' Boys)" (Jennings) – 1:27
18. "Helpful Hint" – 1:50
19. "It's Who You Know" (Cervenka, Doe) – 1:56
20. "Old Crow" – 1:35
21. "Kowtow" – 2:13
22. "Torch" – 2:33

== Credits ==
- Cinder Block – vocals
- Jeffrey Bischoff – guitar
- Pete Rypins – bass
- Gabe Meline – bass
- Jimi Cheetah – bass
- Vincent Camacho – drums
- Engineered by Bart Thurber, Kevin Army, Andy Ernst, Billie Joe Armstrong, and Neill King
- Remixed by Ryan Greene
