= Retching Red =

American hardcore punk band

- Origin: Oakland, California, United States
- Genres: Hardcore punk
- Years active: 2004–2006
- Labels: Rodent Popsicle Records; Overdose On Records
- Members: Cinder Block; Cyco Logic Loco; Jake Dudley; Adam Grant

Retching Red was an American, Oakland, California-based hardcore punk band, that formed in late July 2004. Their lyrics mainly deal with feminist and leftist political issues.

The band consisted of founding members Cinder Block (vocals, formerly of Tilt and Fabulous Disaster) and bass player Mike "Cyco Logic Loco" Avilez (of Oppressed Logic, Angry Samoans, Strung Up), with Adam Grant (of Creepy) on drums and Jake Dudley (from Second Opinion) on guitar. Rodent Popsicle Records released their debut CD entitled, Get Your Red Wings, later that year.

Retching Red released their second album, Scarlet Whore of War, in April 2006 and followed it up with a month-long tour of Europe and a full US tour in July. In September 2006, they released a split 7-inch with The Twats, and have been on indefinite hiatus since.

Retching Red has played multiple shows at 924 Gilman Street in the mid-2010s Jake Dudley continues to play in hardcore bands such as Second Opinion, Nightstick Justice & Ecoli. Drummer, Adam Grant still plays in indie/pop-punk bands Creepy and Oppressed Logic.

== Discography ==
- Get Your Red Wings (2004)
- Scarlet Whore of War (2006)
- Retching Red & The Twats split 7-inch (2006)
