= Viewers Like You (album) =

Studio album by Tilt
- Released: August 10, 1999
- Recorded: March – April, 1999; Motor Studios, San Francisco, California, US
- Genre: Punk rock
- Length: 35:30
- Label: Fat Wreck Chords
- Producer: Fat Mike; Ryan Greene

Tilt chronology
Collect 'Em All (1998)	Viewers Like You (1999)	Been Where? Did What? (2001)

Professional ratings
Review scores
Source	Rating
AllMusic	3/5 stars

Viewers Like You is the fourth and final studio album by Californian punk rock band, Tilt. It was released in August 1999 on Fat Wreck Chords.

== Track listing ==
- All lyrics written by Cinder Block
1. "Annie Segall" – 2:42
2. "Die of Shame" – 2:48
3. "War Room" – 2:26
4. "Animated Corpse" – 2:44
5. "Pontiac" – 2:28
6. "Fine Ride" – 3:29
7. "Viewers Like You" – 2:41
8. "Pious" – 2:23
9. "Penny Ante" – 2:16
10. "Mama's Little Man" – 2:00
11. "Dog Collar" – 1:33
12. "Restless Irritable & Discontent" – 2:21
13. "Counting" – 2:55
14. "Want to Do" – 2:44

== Credits ==
- Cinder Block – vocals
- Jeffrey Bischoff – guitar
- Jimi Cheetah – bass
- Vincent Camacho – drums
- Recorded March – April, 1999 at Motor Studios, San Francisco, California, US
- Produced by Fat Mike and Ryan Greene
- Engineered by Ryan Greene and Adam Krammer
