= New Bomb Turks =

American punk rock band

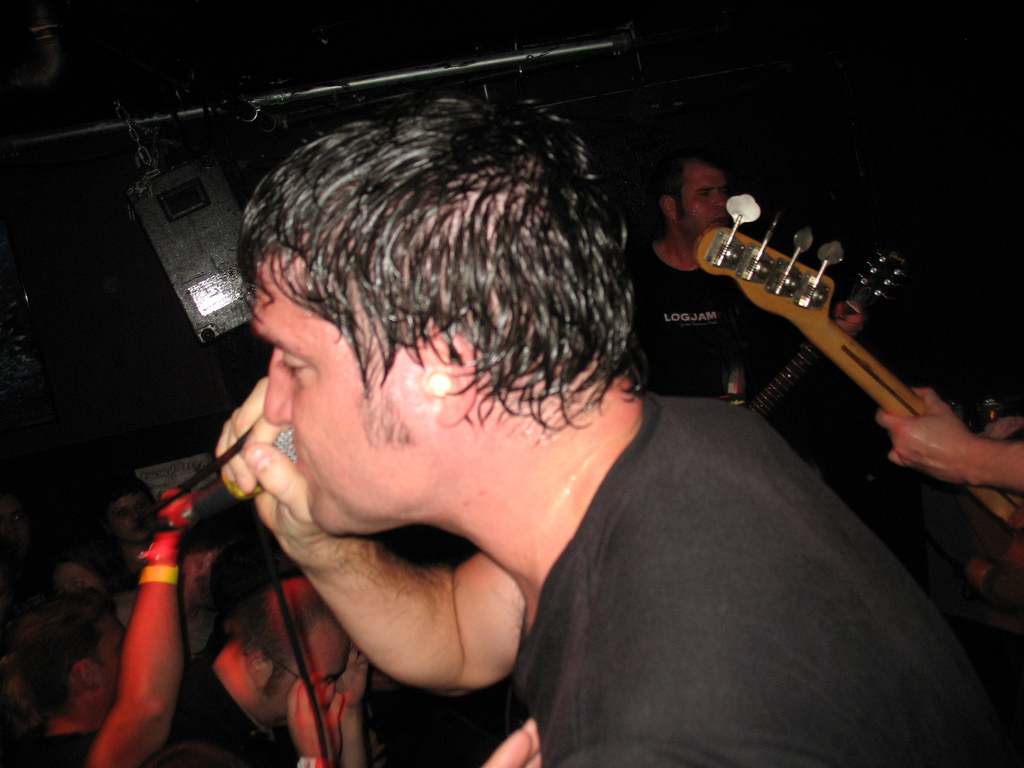
- The New Bomb Turks and Spitzz at the Abbey lounge in 19 August 2006

Background information
- Origin: Columbus, Ohio, US
- Genres: Garage punk; punk rock; garage rock
- Years active: 1990–present
- Labels: Crypt; Gearhead; Epitaph; Fat Wreck Chords
- Members: Jim Weber; Eric Davidson; Sam Brown; Matt Reber
- Past members: Bill Randt
- Website: newbombturks.com

The New Bomb Turks are an American punk rock band formed at Ohio State University in Columbus, Ohio, United States, in 1990. The founding members are Jim Weber, Eric Davidson, Bill Randt, and Matt Reber. Sam Brown replaced Bill Randt on drums in 1999. Early on their inspiration came from the Devil Dogs, Lazy Cowgirls, Union Carbide Productions, Didjits, and the Fluid. Music magazine Alternative Press has described their musical style, saying, "Not only have both prole-threat punk bashery and destructo-rock found fresh voices, they've been melded into a seamless new terror all its own." The New Bomb Turks have released ten full-length LPs, two EPs, and over twenty singles, some of which contain songs not available elsewhere. Their early recordings appear on the Datapanik, Sympathy For The Record Industry, Get Hip and Bag of Hammers labels. Crypt Records signed the band and released !!Destroy-Oh-Boy!!, Information Highway Revisited, and Pissing Out The Poison. Then Epitaph Records signed them and released LPs Scared Straight, At Rope's End and Nightmare Scenario. Gearhead Records released their next album, The Night Before the Day the Earth Stood Still. The band also released three b-side and outtakes compilations: Pissing Out the Poison, The Big Combo, and Switchblade Tongues & Butterknife Brains.

As of 2005, the New Bomb Turks have slowed down their touring and recording in order to pursue other interests. Guitarist Jim Weber, for example, is now a 10th and 11th grade English teacher at Hilliard Davidson High School while Eric Davidson is also the singer in Livids since forming the band with others in Brooklyn, New York, in early 2011.

The band's name refers to the main character (Newbomb Turk) in the 1980 film The Hollywood Knights, played by Robert Wuhl.

== We Never Learn: The Gunk Punk Undergut, 1988–2001 ==
In 2010, Eric Davidson wrote We Never Learn: The Gunk Punk Undergut, 1988–2001, a paperback chronicling the underground punk movement between 1988 and 2001, particularly the Gunk Punk era of lo-fi recordings and garage punk and blues punk.

== Discography ==
=== Albums ===
- !!Destroy-Oh-Boy!! (1993)
- Information Highway Revisited (1994)
- Pissing Out the Poison: Singles & Other Swill... (1995)
- Scared Straight (1996)
- At Rope's End (1998)
- Nightmare Scenario (2000)
- The Big Combo (2001)
- The Night Before the Day the Earth Stood Still (2002)
- Switchblade Tongues & Butterknife Brains (2003)

=== EPs ===
- Drunk On Cock (EP, 1993)
- Berühren Meiner Affe (EP, 1999)
- The Blind Run (EP, 2000)

=== Singles ===
- "So Cool, So Clean, So Sparkling Clear" (1992)
- "Trying To Get By" b/w "Last Lost Fight" (1992)
- "Bottle Island" b/w "Youngblood" (1993)
- "I Wanna Sleep" b/w "Jim" and "Up for a Downslide" (1993)
- "I'm Weak" b/w "Summer Romance" (1993)
- "The Next Big Thing" (1993)
- "So Young, So Fair, So Debonair" (1993)
- "Sharpen-Up Time" b/w "Laissez Faire Stare" (1993)
- "Gotta Gotta Sinking Feeling" b/w "Feel It" (1995)
- "My Hopes are Copacetic" b/w "Sexual Dreaming" (1995)
- "Stick It Out" b/w "(Still) Never Will" and "Job" (1996)
- "Professional Againster" b/w "Jiving Sister Fanny" (1997)
- "Snap Decision" b/w "Jaguar Ride" (1998)
- "Veronica Lake"/"Snap Decision" b/w "Double Marlon"/"Don't Kimosabe Me" (1998)
- "Raw Law" b/w "So Long Silver Lining" (live), "Hammerless Nail" (live), "Tail Crush" (live) (1998)
- "Spanish Fly by Night" b/w "Chip Away at the Stone" (2000)
- "Pretty Lightning" b/w "Buckeye Donuts" and "Law of the Long Arm" (2003)

=== Splits ===
- "Tail Crush" and "Out of My Mind" b/w Gaunt "Volcano" and "Valentine" (1991)
- "Dogs on 45 Medley" b/w The Devil Dogs "Tattooed Apathetic Boys" (1993)
- In the Wee Small Hours, "Deathbedside Manner" b/w Sinister Six "Movin' On" (1993)
- "I Hate People" b/w Entombed "Night of the Vampire" (1995)
- "All the Right Places" b/w The Hellacopters "Lowered Pentangles (Nothing at All)" (1999)
- "Good on ya Baby" b/w The Onyas "Nightlife" (1999)

=== Compilations ===
- Bumped By Karaoke: Datapanik's Greatest Hits Vol. II (Datapanik, 1992)
- Happy Birthday, Baby Jesus (Sympathy For The Record Industry, 1993)
- Shave The Baby: Datapanik's Greatest Hits: Volume 1 (Engine/Blackout! Records, 1993)
- Cowtown EP Volume II (Anyway Records, 1993)
- Cheapo Crypt Sampler (Crypt Records, 1994)
- Assassins Of Silence Hundred Watt Violence (Ceres Records, 1995)
- 500 Miles To Glory (Gearhead Records, 1995)
- Punk Rock Jukebox (Cherrydisc/Blackout! Records, 1995)
- Nardwuar The Human Serviette Presents: Skookum Chief Powered Teenage Zit Rock Angst (NardWuar Records, 1995)
- Glory Daze Soundtrack (Kung Fu Records, 1996)
- Punk-O-Rama 2 (Epitaph, 1996)
- Cheapo Crypt Sampler II (Crypt Records, 1997)
- Punk-O-Rama 3 (Epitaph, 1998)
- Punk-O-Rama 4 (Epitaph, 1999)
- Punk-O-Rama 5 (Epitaph, 2000)
- The Las Vegas Shakedown (Masked Superstar, 2000)
- How We Rock (Burning Heart Records, 2002)
- Smash Up Derby (Gearhead Records, 2002)
- The Gearhead Records Thingmaker (Gearhead Records, 2003)
- Motorcycle Mania 3 Soundtrack (BMG, 2004)
- Attack From the Planet of the Devil Dogs (Head Dip, 2004)
- A Fistful of Rock N Roll Volume 9 (Devil Doll, 2009)
