= Toronto goth scene =

Goth subculture in Toronto, Canada

The Toronto goth scene, the cultural locus of the goth subculture in Toronto, Ontario, Canada and the associated music and fashion scene, has distinct origins from goth scenes of other goth subcultural centres, such as the UK or Germany. Originally known as the "Batcavers", the term "goth" appeared only after 1988, when it was applied to the pre-existent subculture. Distinctive features included internationally recognized gothic and vampiric fashion store 'Siren', a goth-industrial bar named 'Sanctuary: The Vampire Sex Bar', and Forever Knight, a television series about an 800-year-old vampire living in Toronto. In Toronto, the goths did not seek to reject mainstream status, and achieved partial acceptance throughout the mid to late 1990s.

== History ==
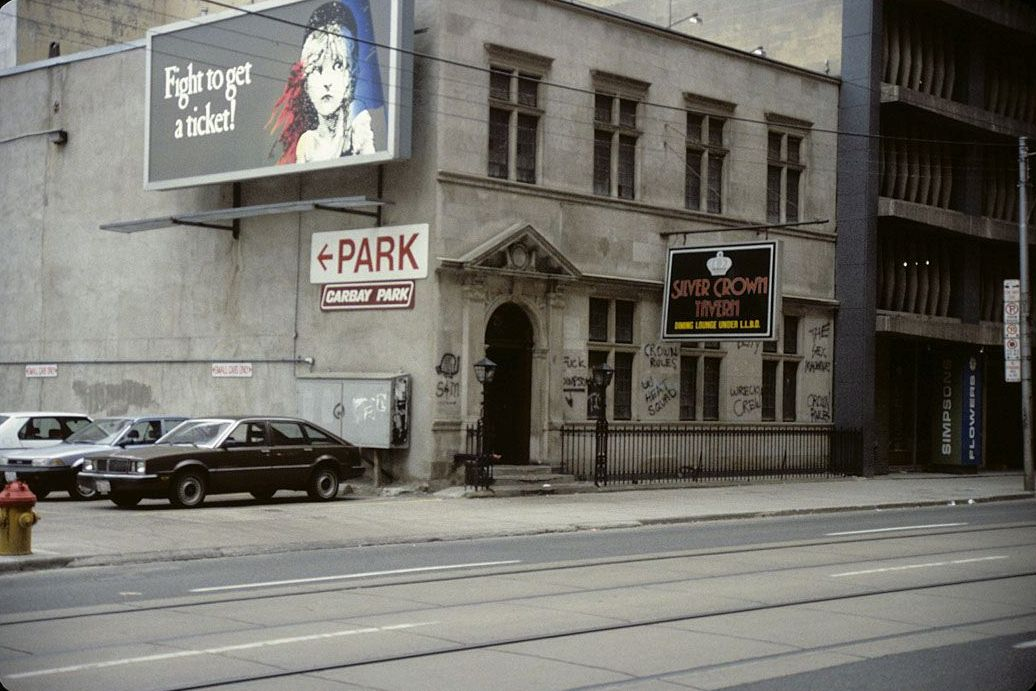
The Silver Crown Tavern at 25 Richmond Street West in 1989.

In the UK, where goth rock originated, the term "gothic" or "goth" was used to refer to a subculture and style of music since circa 1982; however, in Toronto the usage of the term "goth" and the identification of a subculture as goth did not occur until years later in 1988, when goth rock was already in the midst of what is often referred to as the 'second generation' or 'second wave'.

=== Early years: "Batcavers", "Blitz", "Punks", and "Freaks" ===
In Toronto, the subculture that eventually would morph into "Goth" was an eclectic and varied group that existed prior to 1982 and was a cultural blend of New Romantic, Post-punk, and Hardcore punk enthusiasts. There were various terms in use for members of this scene, including "Batcavers", "Blitz", and "Freaks", but often "punk" was used to describe the look (especially for outsiders). Inclusion had no specific requirements beyond participation in the music scene, it was more diverse than other goth/punk scenes. The "freaks" at this time included fans of specific music genres, and did not exclude people of colour, transgender people, gay people, or any others who participated in the Toronto underground music scene.

Some "freaks", notably Death punks and New Romantics, were extremely fashion-conscious, dressing in darker styles modeled on old black-and-white horror films, Morticia Addams, Lily Munster, film noir or ratty New Romantic and glam rock fashions, but maintained a local "freak" identity and a general lack of knowledge of burgeoning UK goth scene. Some thought of these individuals as "pretentious, vacuous, fashion victims." Although the term "freak" was used generically, many punks disliked being labelled freaks themselves, and considered the term to apply only to others. Some punks used the term "Blitz Kids" when referring to the darker styled New Romantics after 1982.

Paul Samuels, co-owner of Goth Club 'Savage Garden', one of Toronto's longest running goth bars, reported "we were wearing [pointy] skull buckle boots, black jeans and tour t-shirts; after that it was the frilly shirts with long sleeves. Then I mashed in make-up and black, backcombed hair with lots of hairspray. We became the freaks of the town."

The word "freak" was not derogatory; those who called themselves "freak" tended to call everyone in this music scene "freak". In this group were the same individuals who would later become known as "the goths" after 1988. However, unlike concurrent goth subcultures elsewhere, many of these "freaks" were primarily fashion-oriented as opposed to identifying as strongly with gothic rock genre of music in particular.

The area between University Avenue and Spadina Avenue on Queen Street West was home to the punks since the mid seventies. It was a place of old garment and textile industry buildings that time had forgotten in the seventies. Punk got its foothold in venues such as the Horseshoe Tavern, Beverley Hotel, X-Rays and the Black Bull patio (pre-bikers) and changed the area into a bohemian, artistic community (pre-current corporate gentrification). As early goth was evolving out of the punk scene these new goths found a kindred spirit and sense of community in Queen Street West as well. However, rent increases and the economic down turn of the early 1990s drove many shops, designers and residents to move to adjacent neighbourhoods, most notably West Queen West, which is west of Bathurst Street on Queen Street West. Kensington Market also attracted underground or alternative lifestyle individuals, including those who later became the goths.

Live venues in the Queen Street West area started refusing to take punk bands, "Instead, they demanded progressive acts who were evolving out of punk like beautiful butterflies from ugly cocoons"; "music here was for connoseurs [sic] of post-punk new music," says punk rock journalist S. Black.

Queen Street West was the centre of goth revival at the time of the "Queen Street exodus across Spadina." The area became known as the "Fashion District" for its textile and upholstery wholesalers, which allowed goths to cheaply experiment with styles. Queen Street West near Portland Street became known as "Little Gotham", having the highest concentration of goth subculture in the world. The impact of the goth movement in Toronto continues to show in much of the music and arts that have emerged from Toronto since the 1990s.

=== Club Scene ===
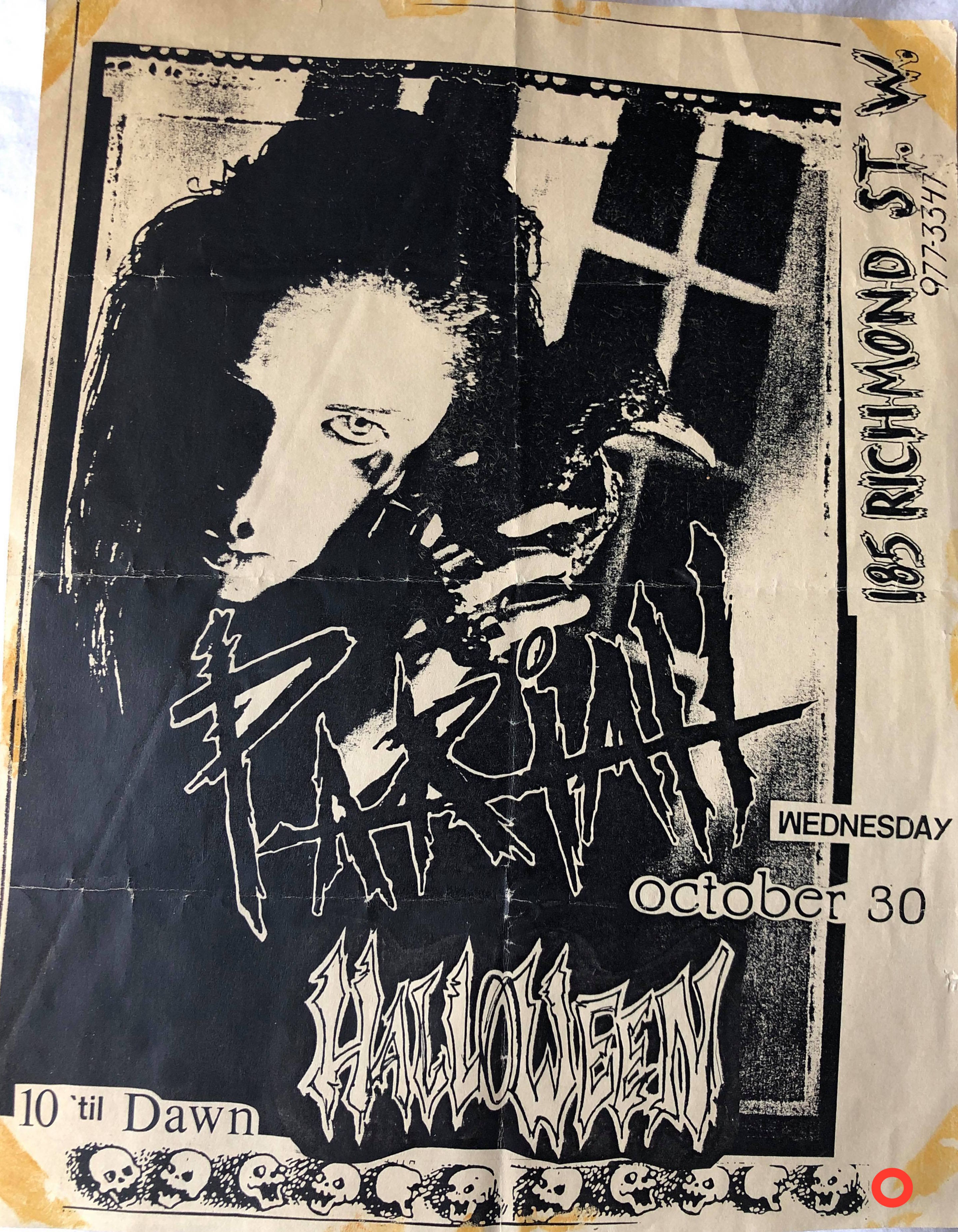
1985 flyer for "Pariah" - a Wednesday night after-hours club in Toronto.

The central hub and breeding ground for the subculture later to be known in Toronto as "goth" was the city's after-hours clubs, beginning with Voodoo on St. Joseph Street (1981–1985), Kongo on Hagerman St. (1983-4), Klub Domino on Isabella (and later Yonge St.) (1979–85), Iguana Lounge on Pears Ave, and perhaps the peak of this early period was Pariah, a Wednesday club night that would run from 10 until dawn, which originated at Kongo in 1983, originally launched by Lynn McNeil, with Siobhan O'Flynn DJ'ing. After closing at the Kongo on Hagerman St., Pariah relaunched with Siobhan O'Flynn and Stephen Scott running the after hours night at the much larger Twilight Zone on Richmond Street (1984–87), owned by the Assoon Brothers. Other prominent DJs from this period included Dave Allen, Pam Barnes, Ivan Palmer, Donny Cochrane, Dan McKay, and others.

Clubs also part of the scene in this period were: the Silver Crown, Club Z (Batcave Night), Catwalk, Nuts and Bolts, and slightly later: Empire Club, Club Noir, Night Gallery, and Lizard Lounge.

Also worthy of note is Century 66 - a restaurant attended and staffed by many members of the scene with a futuristic and dark decor, and the location of many events, including Brian Eno's Thursday Afternoon installation in December 1984.

=== Emergence of Goth beginning 1988 ===
It was 1988 that "Goth" arrived in Toronto. The term "Goth" began to be used to refer to those "freaks" who centred on Gothic fashion and Gothic rock. Elsewhere, merely being a fan of Gothic rock would generally define an individual as a "Goth", but this was not the case in Toronto, where the idea of being "Gothic" was taken very literally; until the mid '90s, the Goths in Toronto considered Gothic literature, romantic poetry, Gothic fashion and Gothic aesthetics, especially beauty, to be subcultural requirements as well. Anne Rice, Edgar Allan Poe, Lord Byron, Bram Stoker and other Gothic romanticist authors were extensively read and considered social obligations. A new, darker vampire fashion became the default definition of Torontonian Goth style.

The mid-1980s - 1991 saw the emergence of proto-type gothic bands appeared such as Vital Sines, Breeding Ground, National Velvet and The Furies.

The year 1989 also saw the opening of a dedicated Gothic fashion store, Siren, on Queen Street West and by 1998 it eventually became the "world's oldest shop catering to the combined enthusiasms of the overlapping communities devoted to the gothic and vampire genres." Groovella Blak, who owned Siren, also later founded the Gothic Society of Canada with then husband Morpheus Blak (which exists today as "The Dark Place"). Groovella was Toronto's best known "Goth girl", considered a 'fairy gothmother', and at the height of the Toronto vampire craze in mid-'90s had her canine teeth filed into fangs and always wore black or black with red. However, Icewind, the organizer of the Toronto Vampire Meetup Group, stated that obsession with vampire mythology and fashion is simply part of Goth subculture itself and does not make one a vampire, "they're not what we'd call vampires, they just like the culture."

Industrial music became a major additional style popular in the Toronto goth scene; Skinny Puppy a Vancouver-based Industrial band inspired an interest in animal rights in many "Industrial-goths" in Toronto. Also at this time, bands such as Depeche Mode, although not goth themselves, were very influential in attracting mainstream music followers into the goth subculture in Toronto. On September 3, 1992, a bar named "Sanctuary: The Vampire Sex Bar" opened on Queen Street West, in step with the increasing popularity of vampiric-goth archetypes. Sanctuary originally imposed a gothic dress code to strictly adhere to the gothic fashion aspect of the scene. Sexual activity did not actually occur in the bar. The book, "Tales From Sanctuary: The Vampire Sex Bar" (1997) documented tales and anecdotes from Toronto's alleged "vampire" scene.

Fetish fashion had always been associated with the early goth scene having adopted it from the punk scene aesthetics. Leathercraft and later Northbound Leather, both on Yonge Street were key retail outlets for the emergence of fetish culture in Toronto. When it started to gain mass popularity in the Toronto goth scene, many individuals soon equated "Fetish" with "Goth". Similarly pop-culture began to heavily influence the Toronto goths: with Marilyn Manson and Betty Page being perceived by the public as "goth", and the movie The Crow showcasing gothic aesthetics and goth protagonists, more and more Torontonians became interested in being part of the "goth subculture". Although these new emerging movements did not necessarily share the same outlooks as the earlier goths, nor an interest in the same styles of music and fashion, the scene itself flourished with a new emphasis on sexuality.

By the mid 90s, and continuing thereafter, Toronto goths held regular BDSM or goth fetish nights. Costuming was a major aspect of this event. Unlike purist fetishists, goths were more likely to be found laughing or taking turns. Sex and sexuality also played a larger part at goth fetish nights than purist fetishist events.

=== Increasing mainstream influences ===
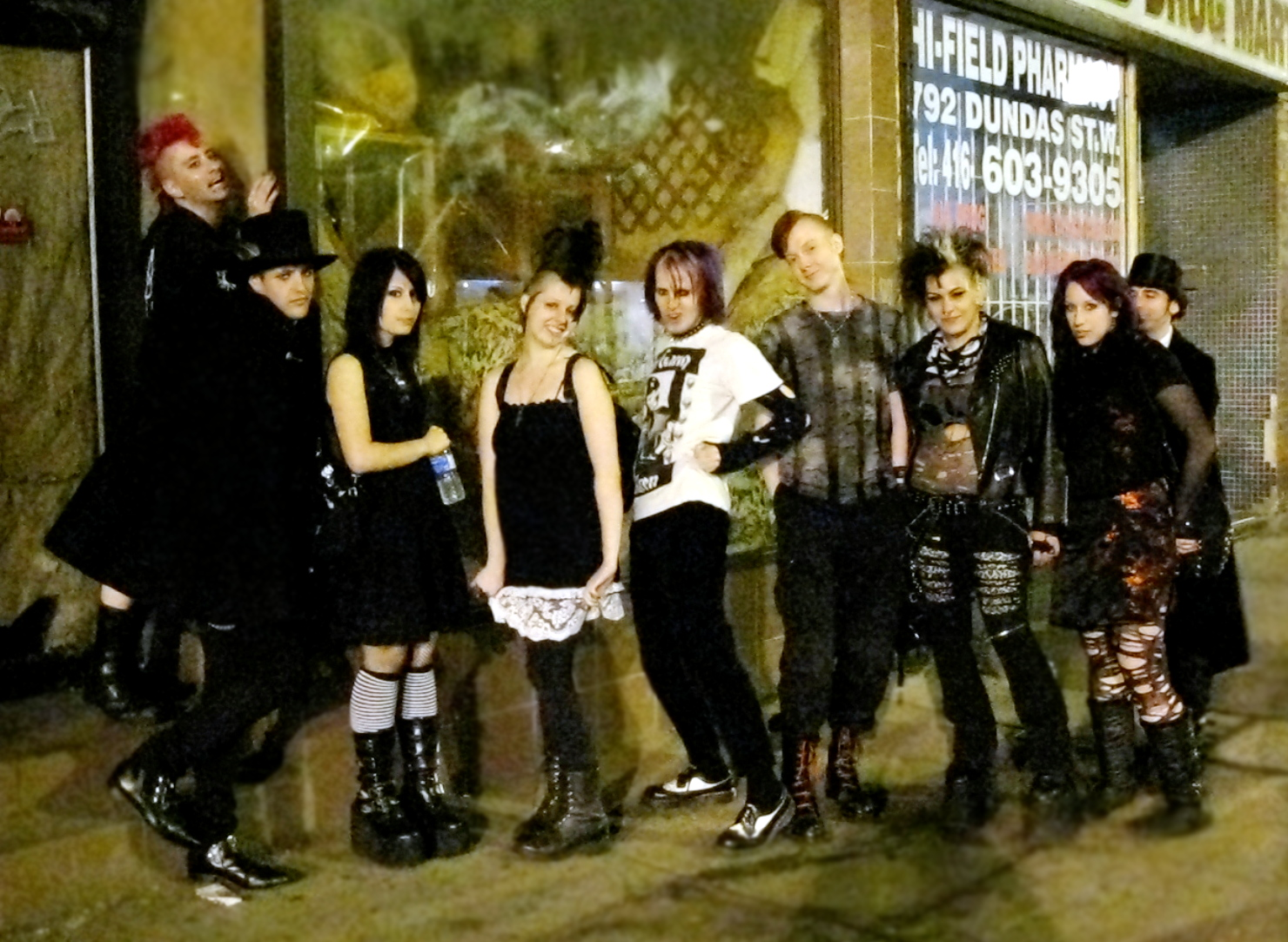
Toronto goths on Dundas Street West in 2008

Forever Knight (1992–1996) was an internationally aired television series filmed in and around Toronto about an 800-year-old vampire who becomes a member of the Metropolitan Toronto Police and attempts to regain his humanity. The local references, landmarks and street names intrigued fans as part of a city of vampires.

Canadian fantasy author, Tanya Huff, wrote a series of supernatural detective novels known as the Blood Books between 1991 until present, featuring a fictional historical romance author, Henry Fitzroy, who happens to be a vampire. The series is set in Toronto and uses familiar landmarks. In 2007, this series was adapted for television under the title Blood Ties.

The vampire novel The Night Inside (1994) referred to West Queen West as "a crowd of vampire wanna-bes" with "pale faces, black-lined eyes."

In Toronto, the goth subculture became widespread enough that the media referred to it as "pop-culture", in contrast with the term "cult" that would be applied in later years. In 1998, Johnson Cummins, a music journalist for the Montreal Mirror, reported that Toronto had a higher concentration of goths than anywhere else in the world and that anyone walking down Queen Street could not avoid seeing many of them. At this time, Mitch Krol, lead singer of the Toronto-based goth band Masochistic Religion, became disenchanted with direction of the Toronto scene, calling it shallow, pretentious, primarily concerned with money and glam, and stating that it was no longer goth. Masochistic Religion thereafter relocated to Montreal, Quebec.

=== School shootings and decline in popularity ===
In 1999, a school shooting at Columbine High School in Littleton, Colorado created a public backlash against local goths and especially gothic youths as some teachers and parents suddenly began to view goth fashion with suspicion and mistrust. Violence of any kind had always been very rare at Toronto goth clubs, and notable figures in the goth community spoke to the media against associating violence with "goth". They insisted that the shooters were not goths, did not listen to goth music, and that goths were non-violent and pacifistic. Certain elements of the media, notably the local entertainment and culture media, also defended goths. Eye Weekly columnist Donna Lypchuk wrote, "I've been laughing for the past two weeks as talking heads blame the goth subculture for the killings in Colorado. The mainstream goth movement, which has been around for at least 25 years, is not secret enough to be a subversive society." Five months later a report from authorities in Colorado confirmed that the shooting was not related to goth subculture, and stated that the shooters held goth music in "contempt".

The Ontario Consultants on Religious Tolerance researched the subculture and published a report with the conclusion that goths are non-violent, pacifistic, passive and tolerant of others, and that many in the media had incorrectly associated the goth subculture with violence, hatred of minorities, white supremacy, etc. They found that the goth ideology is actually based on recognition, identification and grief over societal and personal evils that the mainstream culture wished to ignore or forget, these being the prevalent themes in goth music.

Regardless of the fact that the Columbine Shooting was not related to goth subculture, the Toronto goth scene began to decline. Goth bars closed, and goth culture-oriented businesses shut down, including Siren and Sanctuary, which was the longest-running gothic bar as well as the first industrial club in Canada. By mid-2001 goth music was no longer in significant demand in Toronto, and consequently night clubs had generally stopped playing it. As the chain reaction continued, live venues stopped booking it. Bands like The Birthday Massacre, Vegasphere, Dream Corrosion, Rhea's Obsession, and Bitter Fall, who were accustomed to playing to full houses, especially when in their hometown, would discover that was no longer the case. Clinging to the idea that the goth subculture was not dying but merely changing, in 2002, local goths tried to revitalize the community by holding events keyed towards introducing older goths to the younger generation. In 2003 it was reported that where other cities had lost their base of goth and industrial fans, Toronto's scene was holding on, or even growing. By 2004 it was reported that local interest in goth rock was stagnant, and some DJ's advocated a shift towards cybergoth music. By late 2005, one media outlet was predicting the downfall of the goth scene in Toronto, stating goth had "returned to its sociopathic roots" and advising readers to "bask in the nostalgia while it lasts." After the 2006 Dawson College shooting on September 13, 2006, the Toronto Sun criticized goths: describing it as "unbelievable" that in the wake of Dawson, in the nearby City of London, Ontario, goths were organizing to raise money for charity. Toronto Sun columnist, Michele Mandele advised goths to "stay home" and suggested that goths feel no responsibility to help prevent tragedies such as the shooting at Dawson College.

=== The Toronto goth scene today (2015–present) ===
Every goth bar in Toronto has closed down. Goth themed events are very rare, and are mostly kink events that have some crossover with the goth subculture. Goth and fetish clothing shops are still around but are few and far between.

== Subcultural traits ==
Toronto's goths have been noted for subcultural traits which are not noted for goth subcultures in general.

=== Mainstream acceptance ===
According to Nancy Kilpatrick's book, The Goth Bible, goths generally are secretive and goths tend to hide the meaning of goth away from the mainstream. She found that goth is an underground movement and keeping it separate from the mainstream is what keeps it alive. In 1999 Diane Sawyer, of the American television show 20/20, dubbed goth as "a dark, underground national phenomenon".

However, according to Matthew Didier, founder of The Toronto Ghosts and Hauntings Research Society and regular contributor to the CFRB paranormal radio show "Mind/Shift", speaking of Torontonian goths "They want to be 'professional' and be accepted for their contributions to whatever than shunned. They want to be "The Goth Lawyer" or "The Goth Accountant"... not the scary person in the gutter." According to Time Out Toronto, a tourist guide published in 2005, the local goths had a slogan: "Making Toronto a darker place."

This may be consistent with the multicultural nature of Toronto. According to the United Nations Development Programme, Toronto has the second-highest percentage of foreign-born population among world cities. Multiculturalism became official policy in Canada in 1971, before any other country in the world.

Rightfully or not, in Toronto, after the Columbine shooting, goth professionals, also called "Corporate Goths", have often felt as if they had to hide their subcultural identity from the workplace because of the negative stigma associated with goth culture.

=== Apparently heightened emphasis on fashion ===
Fashion is widely considered to be part of the goth subculture, however in Toronto, "goth" was an outgrowth of what was already a very fashion conscious subsection of the "freak" subculture (see History), and since then, fashion predominantly tended to define "goth" in Toronto. The Toronto mainstream culture media reported that fashion was the most appealing facet of the goth scene.

In 1998, Mitch Kroll, lead singer of the, then Toronto-based, goth band, Masochistic Religion, criticized "the people who were calling themselves goth in Toronto" for their shallow over-emphasis on fashion, calling them "glam".

After the Columbine Massacre in 1999 one notable goth club owner in Toronto, Lance Goth, commented to the media that he believed the shooters "weren't the least bit goth. They didn't even dye their hair black."

It is not clear after 1999 whether what remains of Toronto goth subculture, emphasizes fashion more, less, or the same as goth subculture elsewhere.

== Historic subcultural events ==
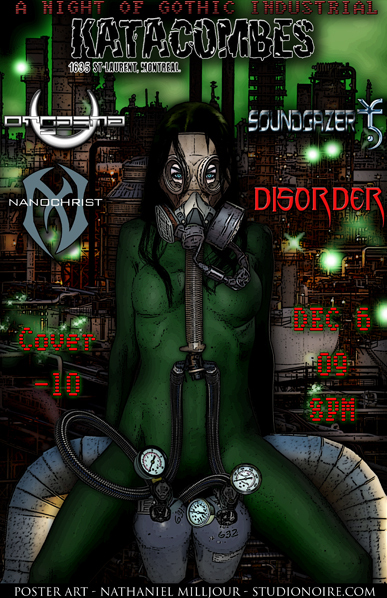
Poster for Katacombes Nightclub by poster artist Nathaniel Milljour featuring Toronto-based bands Nanochrist and Soundgazer.

In 1998, Toronto was host to Convergence IV, an annual North American meeting of net.goths.

Events included:

- Masochistic Religion and DJs Michael Salo and Greg Clow played at the Opera House on August 21, 1998.
- Faith and the Muse, Rhea's Obsession, the Changelings and My Scarlet Life with DJ Marylace played at the Opera House on August 22.
- An April March and DJs Lady Bathory and Lord Pale played Clinton's on August 23, with the goth/medieval magick sideshow Carnival Xaotika as the added attraction.

== List of Toronto goth bands ==
A number bands that have performed and recorded goth, punk, post punk and industrial music based out of Toronto.

- The Birthday Massacre
- Masochistic Religion
- Rhea's Obsession
- Dream Corrosion
- Breeding Ground
- Vegasphere
- National Velvet
- Vampire Beach Babes
- Bitter Fall
- Vital Sines
- Johnny Hollow
- Ariel
- Mindless Insurrection
- Parade
- Sex Without Souls
- Walls of Jericho

== See also ==
- Cleveland Goth
- Freak scene
- Culture in Toronto
- Gothic Revival architecture in Canada
- Neo (nightclub)
