= We Never Learn: The Gunk Punk Undergut, 1988–2001 =

2010 book written by Eric Davidson

- Author: Eric Davidson
- Genre: Non-fiction
- Publication date: 2010

We Never Learn: The Gunk Punk Undergut, 1988–2001 is a 2010 book written by Eric Davidson of the New Bomb Turks.

The book covers a specific sub-culture of punk and garage rock, which Davidson refers to as "Gunk Punk." It features true stories about The White Stripes, The Oblivians, Billy Childish, The Gories, The Hives, Jay Reatard and more.

The book also touches on the importances of independent labels like Norton Records, Crypt Records and In the Red Records.
