= 'Til It Kills =

Studio album by Tilt
- Released: April 17, 1995
- Genre: Punk rock
- Length: 37:44
- Label: Fat Wreck Chords
- Producer: Kevin Army

Tilt chronology
Play Cell (1993)	'Til It Kills (1995)	Collect 'Em All (1998)

Professional ratings
Review scores
Source	Rating
Allmusic	3/5 stars

'Til It Kills is the second studio album by California punk rock band, Tilt. It was released in April 1995 on Fat Wreck Chords.

== Track listing ==
All tracks are written by Cinder Block.

No.	Title	Length
1.	"Libel"	2:22
2.	"Confines of Love"	2:06
3.	"Leanin' Like a Barn"	1:40
4.	"Unravel"	2:07
5.	"Suspended"	2:12
6.	"Acathisia"	2:22
7.	"'Til It Kills"	2:03
8.	"Windowsill"	1:47
9.	"Dumb Little World"	2:01
10.	"Land of Fragments"	1:37
11.	"Lips, Tits, Hips"	1:49
12.	"Past the Point"	1:31
13.	"Dirty Kitchen"	2:19
14.	"Berkeley Pier"	11:48

== Personnel ==
- Cinder Block – vocals
- Jeffrey Bischoff – guitar
- Gabe Meline – bass
- Vincent Camacho – drums

=== Additional Personnel ===
- Produced by Kevin Army
