= Play Cell =

Studio album by Tilt
- Released: June 4, 1993
- Recorded: March–April 1993
- Studios: Sound and Vision Studios in San Francisco
- Genre: Punk rock
- Length: 31:43
- Label: Lookout
- Producer: Mark Lemaire

Tilt chronology
Tilt (1992)	Play Cell (1993)	Til It Kills (1995)

Professional ratings
Review scores
Source	Rating
AllMusic	4/5 stars

Play Cell is the debut studio album by the American punk rock band Tilt. The album was released on June 4, 1993, through Lookout Records with the catalog number LK 071. It was the group's last release on Lookout! before the band signed to Fat Wreck Chords two years later. Play Cell also marks the last Tilt recording to feature bassist Pete Rypins, who left the group in 1994 and was replaced by Gabe Meline.

== Track listing ==
All tracks are written by Cinder Block, except where noted.

No.	Title	Length
1.	"Crying Jag"	2:26
2.	"White Homes"	2:07
3.	"Dead Bum"	2:34
4.	"Play Cell"	2:52
5.	"Fool to Blame" (written by Pete Rypins)	1:45
6.	"Locust"	2:16
7.	"Small Bills"	1:50
8.	"Yellow Bellies"	1:47
9.	"One Day" (written by Block and Rypins)	2:23
10.	"Come Across" (written by Block and Rypins)	2:50
11.	"Idiot Lips"	2:32
12.	"Unlucky Lounge"	2:12
13.	"Bad Seed" (written by Devil Doll and Rypins)	1:52
14.	"Poor Infant"	2:17
Total length:		31:43

== Personnel ==
- Cinder Block – lead vocals
- Jeffrey Bischoff – guitar, backing vocals
- Pete Rypins – bass, backing vocals
- Vincent Camacho – drums

Production

- Mark Lemaire – production
- Kevin Army – engineering
- John Golden – mastering
- Alicia J. Rose and Cinder Block – cover art
- Idon Bryant – photography
- Sergie Loobkoff – graphic design
