= Tilt (American band) =

American punk rock band

- Origin: East Bay, California, U.S.
- Genres: Punk rock
- Years active: 1992–2001, 2015, 2017
- Labels: Fat Wreck Chords, Lookout!
- Members: Cinder Block; Pete Rypins; Vince Camacho; Jeffrey Bischoff
- Past members: Gabe Meline; Francesco Celletti; Jimi Cheetah

Tilt was an American punk rock band from the East Bay, California, formed in 1992. The group's debut studio album, Play Cell, was released through Lookout Records in 1993. They were later signed to Fat Wreck Chords, who released the rest of the band's albums. The band consisted of Cinder Block (vocals), Jeffrey Bischoff (guitar), Pete Rypins (bass), and Vincent Camacho (drums). Starting on February 15, 1994, at the Cattle Club in Sacramento and ending on April 6, 1994, in Vancouver, Tilt supported Green Day on their Dookie tour.

Tilt's song "Crying Jag" appears on the soundtrack for the film Glory Daze (1996). Tilt broke up for a short time in 1996 but reunited in 1997 with Jimi Cheetah of Screw 32. They were scheduled to play a one-night-only reunion show on May 13, 2011, at 924 Gilman Street in Berkeley, California but had to cancel because the bass player injured his arm needing surgery. The show was never rescheduled. However, Tilt played a one-off reunion show in the fall of 2015 as a part of a two-day festival to celebrate the 25th anniversary of Fat Wreck Chords. They played another reunion show on January 1, 2017, at 924 Gilman Street.

Cinder Block was also the lead singer for Retching Red, Fabulous Disaster, and The Pathogens.

== Discography ==
=== Studio albums ===
- Play Cell (1993) Lookout Records
- 'Til It Kills (1995) Fat Wreck Chords
- Collect 'Em All (1998) Fat Wreck Chords
- Viewers Like You (1999) Fat Wreck Chords

=== Compilation albums ===
- Been Where? Did What? (2001) Fat Wreck Chords

=== Extended plays ===
- Tilt (1992) Lookout Records
- Worse to Bad (1995) Munster Records
- Gun Play (1998) Fat Wreck Chords

=== Singles ===
- "Libel" (1995) Fat Wreck Chords
- "War Room" / "Animated Corpse" (1999) Fat Wreck Chords

=== Compilation and soundtrack appearances ===
- "Weave and Unravel" on Fat Music for Fat People (1994)
- "White Homes" on Angus: Music from the Motion Picture (1995)
- "Libel" on Fat Music Volume II: Survival of the Fattest (1996)
- "Crying Jag" and "Berkeley Pier" on Glory Daze (soundtrack) (1996)
- "Partial Birth" on Fat Music Volume III: Physical Fatness (1997)
- "Molly Coddled" on A Compilation of Warped Music (1998)
- "Old School Pig" on Fat Music Volume IV: Life in the Fat Lane (1999)
- "John for the Working Man" on Short Music for Short People (1999)
- "Bad Place" on Live Fat, Die Young (2001)
- "War Room" on Wrecktrospective (2009)
- "Crying Jag" on The Lookingouting! (2017)
