= Armed and Hammered =

Canadian punk rock band formed 1989

Armed & Hammered
- Origin: Toronto, Ontario, Canada
- Genres: Hardcore punk
- Years active: 1989–present
- Labels: Ransom Note Recordings, Subvert & Deny, Obese, Coke Dick Records, Lockdown Records
- Spinoffs: The Restarts, The G-Men
- Spinoff of: Masochistic Religion, Bunchofuckingoofs
- Members: Mopa Dean; Kyle Peek "Big John"; Jamie "G"; Preston "Wounded Paw" Sims
- Past members: Kurf; Cindy Beattie; Mark Dickinson; Rick Giroux; Hardcore Dave; Doug McLarty; Kieran Plunkett; Dorian Wilde; Philphee Saunders; Thor Hammersen; Steve Lamo; Allyson Baker

Armed and Hammered is a hardcore punk band from Toronto, Ontario, spawned from Bunchofuckingoofs scene of the early 1980s.

== History ==
Originally formed by singer Mopa Dean, the bassist for Masochistic Religion, and drummer Kyle Peek, the earliest lineup also included Lamo, Philphee Saunders and Bunchofuckingoofs Thor Hammersen.

They played their first show June 7, 1989. By the end of 1990, they had recorded enough live performances that they were able to independently release a 17-track collection called Promoting Peace To Violence 89-90. Eight of those songs appeared on their 1991 12-track demo tape, Fully Loaded. By this time, Lamo, Saunders and Hammersen had been replaced by guitarist Hardcore Dave and bassist Kieran Plunkett.

In 1992, guitarists Big John and Dorian Wilde replaced Hardcore Dave. This line-up was featured on the next several releases: split EPs with Suckerpunch and Oppressed Logic, the song "Rat Poison" which was included in the Raw Energy Records punk compilation Dead on the Road - Songs Without Keyboards, and the song "Beans and Toast" which was included in the 1996 Ransom Note Recordings Compilation Living in Fear.

In 1995, Armed and Hammered claimed that they were banned from a repeat performance on Much Music. The band had played the Kumbaya Festival, which was held at the Molson Amphitheatre (now The Budweiser Stage) to benefit people living with AIDS. It was broadcast live across Canada and rebroadcast the following day; Much Music removed the band's performance from the rebroadcast and replaced it with an R.E.M. video.

The band's line-up would change again. Guitarist Dorian Wilde left in 1994 and was replaced by Kurf. Kieran Plunkett moved to the UK where he toured with The Varukers and formed The Restarts. He was replaced by Rick Giroux, who was replaced in 1997 by former Heatseekers and Suckerpunch bassist, Cindy Beattie. The band's debut full-length album, It's About Fucking Time, was recorded over 1996 and 1997 and features both Rick and Cindy. The CD also features re-recordings of many songs from earlier releases. It also spent some time in the independent charts in Canada. Also in 1996, the European label Subvert & Deny released the four-track EP More Punk Rock Than You.

In 1998, Kurf left the band and was replaced by former Abalienation guitarist, Mark Dickinson. In 2000, following the release of the Negative Aspects of Positive Thinking CD, Mark returned to the US, leaving Armed and Hammered once again with one guitarist. In 2000, Mopa left the group to be replaced by Jaww singer Doug McLarty. After Mopa's departure, the group became mostly inactive, playing only a handful of gigs before their final shows in early 2003. Mopa formed a band called The G-Men in 2002; they played at least one gig with Armed & Hammered, on November 15, 2002, at Sneaky Dee's in Toronto. These final shows featured the return of former members Kurf and Rick.

Armed and Hammered reunited to play a set in support of English group GBH's tour stop at the Mod Club Theatre in Toronto in July 2010, then reformed in May 2012. The band is still performing and recording. In February 2021, they released a four-track split with Vulgar Deli.

== Discography ==
- Promoting Peace Through Violence 89-90 (1990), Cassette, Independent
- Fully Loaded (1991), Cassette, Independent
- Armed & Hammered/Suckerpunch (1993), 7inch EP,, Independent
- Armed & Hammered/Oppressed Logic (1995), 7inch EP, Split with Oppressed Logic, Ransom Note Recordings
- Don't Mess with Punk (1996), Cassette, Independent
- More Punk Rock Than You (1996), 7inch EP, Subvert & Deny Records
- It's About Fucking Time (1997), CD Obese Records
- Negative Aspects of Positive Thinking, (2000), CD Independent
- Armed & Hammered/Vulgar Deli - American Democracy / Kill Johnny Stiff, (2021), 7inch EP, Coke Dick Records

Various Artists Compilations

- Dead On the Road - Songs Without Keyboards (1994), CD, Compilation Inclusion, Raw Energy Records
- Living in Fear (1995), CD, Compilation Inclusion, Ransom Note Recordings
- Disease Control: Vol. 1 (1999), CD, MUCK Records
- Twentybandcomp - Various Artists Vol., (2000), CD Raw Energy Records – Shock Records
- Ontario Punk Rock Compilation - Various Artists Vol. 4 (2020), Compilation Inclusion, CD., Lockdown Records Canada
- Punk Canada Vol. 2 (2023), Compilation Inclusion, LP., En Guard Records Canada

== Band members ==
2012 Lineup

- Kyle Peek – drums
- Mopa Dean – vocals
- Big John (John Mckee) – guitar
- Jamie "G" – guitar
- Preston "Wounded Paw" Sims

Former

- Thor (BFG) Hammersen – bass, former member of Bunchofuckingoofs, Perdition, Ride at Dawn and Blast Furnace
- Steve "Lamo" – guitar
- Phil "Philphee" Saunders – bass
- Kieran Plunkett – bass, member of The Varukers, The Restarts
- Kurf – guitar, former member of PolitiKILL inCOREct, Yeti
- Doug McLarty – vocals, former member of Jaww
- Rick Giroux – bass, member of The G-Men and Son of Bronto, former member of Sinking Ships
- Cindy Beattie – bass, former member of Suckerpunch, The Heatseekers, Sharkskin
- Dorian Wilde – guitar, former member of Suckerpunch
- Mark Dickinson – guitar, member of Others, Bloodsucking Freaks, former member of Abalienation
- Hardcore Dave (David Mcleod) – guitar, former member of Bunchofuckingoofs, Nunoyerfuckinbizznizz, No ID and Landfill
- Allyson Baker – guitar, member of Dirty Ghosts, former member of Teen Crud Combo, Shuttlecocks
- John Grove – bass, member of Bunchofuckingoofs
