= Vampire Beach Babes =

Canadian rock band

- Origin: Toronto, Ontario, Canada
- Years active: 1997–present
- Members: Baron Marcus; Eris
- Past members: Ricky Las Vegas; Dave Kimpton; Melinda; Siren; Velvet; Michael Ratt; Heather; Kurtys Kidd; Julianne Partridge; Anita Ayres
- Website: www.vampirebeachbabes.com

Vampire Beach Babes are a Canadian rock band, from Toronto, Ontario who have toured internationally. Their music combines pop rhythms, goth rock sounds, and electronic/industrial elements. The band is fronted by Baron Marcus and includes a changing roster of members.

== History ==
In 1997, the Vampire Beach Babes released their first album Reckless Summer.

In 2002, the Vampire Beach Babes released Attack of the Killer Bikinis.

The Vampire Beach Babes released the album Beach Blanket Bedlam in 2004. Around this time they started to blend dark-electronic elements into their recording productions and performances. They continued to perform the Toronto club scene, with showcase performances in the United States.

The Vampire Beach Babes and played the Whitby Gothic Weekend in 2006, and that year were featured by Metal Hammer as one of the world's 28 upcoming metal bands to watch for. The Vampire Beach Babes' music has been occasionally featured in television and film, including the October 2007 episode of The Best Years the "Vampires" episode of Shadow Hunter and the Nosferatu Beach Party episode in the fourth season of Dragula.

In 2007, the band members, in addition to Baron Marcus on lead vocal and rhythm guitar, were Melinda a.k.a. Bunny (drums, vocals, rhythm guitar), Siren (vocals, tambourine), Heather (guitar, vocals), and Eris (guitar).

As of 2018, the band is currently active in studio and will be releasing material in the fall of this year, in cooperation with a "Game-Novel" media project (a hybrid album, novel and game level) called Angel Devil Machine.

== Discography ==
- Reckless Summer (1997)
- Attack of the Killer Bikinis (2002)
- Beach Blanket Bedlam (2005)
- Summer of 2006 Advance EP (2006, Limited Edition)
- Freak Parade (2011)

== See also ==
- Music of Canada
- List of Canadian musicians
- List of bands from Canada
- Category:Canadian musical groups
- Goth subculture
- Toronto goth scene
