= Masochistic Religion =

Canadian goth band

- Origin: Toronto, Ontario, Canada
- Genres: goth, industrial metal
- Years active: 1988–1998
- Labels: Truly Diabolic Records; KK/Electrip; Cargo Records; Shadow Records
- Past members: Mitchell D. Krol (James Junkin Jr.); Malissa X Andy Yue; Mopa Dean; D'errol Flynn; Rebecca Rutland; Julie Seddon-Farris; Martine Mathews; Harry Simpson; Stephanie Heyens; Rob Sanzo
- Website: masochisticreligion.com (defunct)

Masochistic Religion was a Canadian goth music group and one of the first goth bands from Toronto, Ontario. The band went through many line-up changes over the years, with the only consistent member being its founder, Mitchell D. Krol (aka James Junkin Jr., born May 23, 1966).

== History ==
In 1987, Krol was playing in a punk band, and found it confining. As he told Nancy Kilpatrick for her 2004 book The Goth Bible: A Compendium for the Darkly Inclined, "I was doing a lot of drugs, getting heavily into the S&M scene and spending a lot of time with my friend Malissa X. I played her some of my music and it really turned her on...so we came up with this concept of Masochistic Religion, a sort of dark S&M theater done to music. All the lyrics were about sex, death, religion, pleasure and pain, and the show was heavy, real and probably illegal."

In 1988, after Krol and X split, Krol's music became more rock-oriented and he released the band's debut album, Cosmic Dancer. The band recorded a lot of music, they performed constantly and, as Krol continued "we were famous for smashing our instruments and destroying clubs."

Krol also became a radio host, with his own show on the University of Toronto's CIUT-FM. It was called Beyond the Gates of Hell, and its purpose was to expose young Goths to different styles of music. Krol also composed the music for the 1996 Julian Grant film, Electra.

In 1990, they were signed to the Belgian label KK Records. In 1997, the band released Litanies of Satan, whose lyrics are based on the writings of Charles Baudelaire. It was very well received by critics.

In 1992, Masochistic Religion played New York's Battery Park with the French-Canadian poet and interdisciplinary artist Pierre-André Arcand.

In 1995, the band was included in the Freedom in a Vacuum series, which took place at The Music Gallery in Toronto.

On October 31, 1996, for The 7th annual Masochistic Religion Halloween Exhibition Of The Macabre, Masochistic Religion released The Raven & Others. It is a 3-track recording of the band's musical take on the works of Edgar Allan Poe. Just 100 copies were released, each one with a hand-made book of the Poe text, and original etchings and design by the Toronto artist Albert Strano.

In August 1998, at The Opera House (Toronto), the band opened Convergence IV, a festival of the Toronto goth scene, with An April March, Rhea's Obsession, My Scarlet Life, The Changelings and Faith and the Muse. They began by carrying Krol onstage in a coffin; he later set a bible on fire.

Bassist, Mopa Dean formed Toronto punk band Armed and Hammered in 1989. Rob Sanzo became a successful record producer.

In 1998, Krol shut down the band, moved to Montreal and recorded a 'dark country' project called 'Swamp Music'. As the recordings were being completed, Krol was stabbed by a drug-crazed occupant of the recording space. The album was not released, although Krol posted the songs online. As of 2021, Krol lives in the United States and performs as a transsexual singer and musician.

== Members ==
- Mitch Krol - vocals
- Mopa Dean - bass, piano
- D'errol Flynn - guitar
- Rebecca Rutland - guitar
- Julie Seddon-Farris - vocals
- Martine Mathews - guitar
- Harry Simpson - drums

== Discography ==
- Cosmic Dancer, 1988, Independent
- Burn In Hell Vol 1, 1990, Shadow Records Canada
- Sonic Revolution Evolve, 1990, KK/Electrip, Cargo UK
- ...And From This Broken Cross... ...Our Misery..., 1994, KK/Electrip, Cargo UK
- The Litanies of Satan, 1997, Truly Diabolic, Cargo America
- The Raven & Others (EP), 1996, Truly Diabolic
- Masochistic Religion For The Piano, 2001, Truly Diabolic

== See also ==
- Music of Canada
- Canadian rock
- List of bands from Canada
