= Collect 'Em All =

Studio album by Tilt
- Released: March 24, 1998
- Recorded: November 1997; Motor Studios, San Francisco, California, US
- Genre: Punk rock
- Length: 29:11
- Label: Fat Wreck Chords
- Producer: Ryan Greene; Tilt

Tilt chronology
Til It Kills (1995)	Collect 'Em All (1998)	Viewers Like You (1999)

Professional ratings
Review scores
Source	Rating
Allmusic	2.5/5 stars

Collect 'Em All is the third studio album by Californian punk rock band, Tilt. It was released in March 1998 on Fat Wreck Chords.

== Track listing ==
- All lyrics written by Cinder Block
1. "Hero Marauder" – 1:47
2. "Palm Tree (In West Oakland)" – 1:51
3. "Partial Birth" – 2:26
4. "Old Skool Pig" – 1:24
5. "Storm Center" – 1:24
6. "Gun Play" – 1:48
7. "Sterile Heaven" – 1:58
8. "Dear Wife" – 3:25
9. "Goddess of the Moon" – 2:29
10. "Collect 'Em All" – 1:52
11. "Tundra" – 1:49
12. "Dental Wreck" – 1:30
13. "Clothes Horse" – 1:42
14. "Minister of Culture" – 1:47
15. "Molly Coddled" – 1:59

== Credits ==
- Cinder Block – vocals
- Jeffrey Bischoff – guitar
- Jimi Cheetah – bass
- Vincent Camacho – drums
- Recorded in November 1997 at Motor Studios, San Francisco, California, US
- Produced by Ryan Greene and Tilt
- Engineered by Ryan Greene
