= The Restarts =

English street punk band

- Origin: London, England
- Genres: Street punk, hardcore punk
- Years active: 1995–present
- Website: www.restarts.co.uk

The Restarts are a street punk band based in London.

The Restarts were formed in 1995 in London with Darragh O'Neill on drums, Kieran Plunkett from Armed and Hammered on bass guitar, and Mik Useless on the guitar. They played many shows in the UK as a trio until Useless left, at which point Alan Campbell joined the band. With Campbell on guitar, they recorded their album System Error LP, but due to his commitments to the UK Subs he had to leave. In April 2003 Robin Licker from the Short Bus Window Lickers joined the Restarts as their new guitarist. They toured extensively in Europe and US. They have played with bands like Born/Dead, Limp Wrist, The Accüsed, Strychnine, Dr. Know and Monster Squad.

The band members are also politically active. For example Robin is a member of Elbit Eight.

== Members ==
- Kieran Plunkett – bass guitar/vocals
- Robin Licker – guitar/vocals
- Jeremy Hayat – drums

== Former members ==
- Mik Useless – guitar, vocals, artwork (1995–2002)
- Darragh O'Neill – drums (1995–2008)
- Alan Campbell – guitars and backing vocals on System Error (2003)
- Bram Provoost – drums/vocals (2008–2015)

== Discography ==
- Jobclub demo (1996)
- Frustration EP (1996)
- Just Gets Worse EP (1997)
- State Rape split twelve inch with Zero Tolerance (1998)
- Your World split seven inch with Broken (1999)
- Legacy of Bigotry split seven inch with Left for Dead (2000)
- State Rape split CD with Fleas and Lice (2002)
- Slumworld CD/LP (2002)
- Actively Seeking Work compilation CD (2003)
- System Error CD/LP (2003)
- Outsider CD (2007)
- Mobocracy split CD with Millions of Dead Cops (2009)
- A Sickness of the Mind CD (2013)
- "Uprising" LP, CD (2019)
