= Oppressed Logic =

US musical group

- Origin: Oakland, California, United States
- Genres: Hardcore punk
- Years active: 1994–present
- Labels: Beer City, Burnt Ramen, Ransom Note
- Members: Mike "Cyco Loco" Avilez; Jim Redens; Jake Martinez; Mike Fuentes
- Past members: See Past Members
- Website: Myspace.com

Oppressed Logic are an American punk band from Oakland, California, United States, who formed in 1994. Currently, the band consists of vocalist Mike Avilez, drummer Jim Redens, guitar and bassist Jake Martinez, and guitarist Mike Fuentes.

The band's first release was a cassette called What They Want... What the Fuck. The first official album the band appeared on was a compilation called Pigs Suck, which was released in 1995 by Clean Plate Records; it featured one Oppressed Logic song called "They're Gonna Die". In late 1995, the band released a split album with Toronto-based punk band Armed and Hammered. They were signed to Beer City Records in 1995 and released their first 7-inch, P.C. Full of Shit!, in 1996. In 1997, they released their fist full-length LP, Ain't A Damn Thing Changed!. Afterwards, in 1997 and 1998 they completed two 6-week tours across the United States. Soon after the tour, they collaborated on a split 7-inch on Beer City Records, Skinheads Smoke Dope with a Cheap Beer Hangover, with recently re-formed punk rock band Fang.

In December 1998, members Jake Martinez, Ruben Luna, and Chuck Beers left the band. Mike Avilez stayed in the band and, with a new lineup consisting of bassist Adrienne Avilez, guitarist Todd Dammit, and drummer Egore, released the band's second full-length CD, It's Harassment, in 1999 on Industrial Strength Records. Oppressed Logic completed a three-week northwest tour into Canada and a two-week southwest tour though Texas in 2000, followed by a four-week European tour and a tour of California in 2001, accompanied by fellow bands Special Duties and Violent Society, to support the release of It's Harassment.

In 2002, Burnt Ramen Records released a compilation of Oppressed Logic's discography, The Past Ain't Gonna Change, containing all of the band's music from P.C. Full of Shit! to the Fang split, as well as some unreleased studio and live tracks.

During this period, Oppressed Logic went through several new drummers in this period, ending with Gabe Skull from Lowlife, for their third album, Ones That Control, which was eventually released in 2004. Oppressed Logic continued to go through lineup changes, with Mike Avilez remaining the only original and consistent member. In 2004, the band toured with Fang. In 2006, Oppressed Logic played selected shows in Europe and USA during a tour with Retching Red.

In 2008, Oppressed Logic briefly moved to Raleigh, North Carolina, before moving back to Oakland to reform with original and past members Jake Martinez (Blown to Bits, Exit Wound), Chuck Beers (Retox), and Ruben Luna (Exit Wound).

Mike Avilez still continues with Oppressed Logic; he also had stints in Last Round Up, Retching Red, Angry Samoans, Strung Up, Hot Plate, Fukm, Guantanamo Dogpile, Zero Bull Shit, Luicidal, Fang, and Battalion of Saints, among others.

== Current members ==
- Mike Avilez (vocals)
- Jim Redens (drums)
- Jake Martinez (guitar, bass)
- Mike Fuentes (guitar)

== Past members ==
- Wade Brown (bass)
- Chris DeLoria (bass)
- Chuck Beers (drums)
- Todd Dammit (guitar)
- Adrienne Avilez (bass)
- Eric Davis (drums)
- Gabe Van Dyke (drums)
- James Wysynski (guitar)
- Adam Grant (drums)
- Whore-Hey (guitar)
- Brian Schopflin (bass, guitar)
- Foffle (bass)
- Mikey Porter (guitar)
- Chumley Porter (bass)

== Discography ==
Full-Length Albums
Year	Release	Release type	Label
1994	What They Want... What the Fuck	Cassette	N/A
1997	Ain't a Damn Thing Changed!	CD	Beer City Records
1999	It's Harassment	CD	Beer City Records
2002	The Past Ain't Gonna Change	CD	Burnt Ramen Records
2004	Ones That Control	CD	Blazing Guns Records

Extended Plays
Year	Release	Release type	Label
1996	P.C. Full of Shit!	7-inch	Beer City Records
2000	Industrial Strength Records Sampler (15,000 pressed)	CD	Industrial Strength Records
2001	Industrial Strength Records Sampler No. 2 (6,000 pressed)	CD	Industrial Strength Records

Compilation Appearances
Year	Compilation	Release type	Label
1995	Pigs Suck!	7-inch	Clean Plate Records
1995	Living in Fear	CD	Ransom Note Records
1995	How Lovely Nowhere Is	CD	Nothing Records
1997	Backyard Shenanigans	CD	N/A
1998	Checking In with the World	CD	Cold Front Records
1999	Black Eyes & Broken Bottles	CD	Beer City Records
1999	Welcome to the Bay	CD	Industrial Strength Records
2000	Stranglehold	CD	Triple X Records
2000	Music to Kill Yourself By	CD	Caustic Truths Zine No. 73
2002	The ELV Benefit CD	CD	Beer City Records
2003	Almost 10 Years of Losing and Fucking Up	CD	Friendly Cow Records (Germany)
2004	Counter Attack	CD	Beer City Records
2004	All Tanked Up	CD	N/A
2005	Punk Rock Repo	CD	N/A
2005	Radio Unfriendly	CD	N/A
2006	Kamikaze Broadcast Vol. 2	CD	N/A

Splits
Year	Album	Type	Label
1995	Armed and Hammered / Oppressed Logic	7-inch split (with Armed and Hammered)	Ransom Note Records
1999	Skinheads Smoke Dope with a Cheap Beer Hangover	7-inch split (with Fang)	Beer City Records

Music Videos
Year	Video	Label
1999	"Tanked"	Beer City Records
