= Destroy-Oh-Boy! =

1993 EP by New Bomb Turks

Studio album by New Bomb Turks
- Released: 1993
- Studio: Coyote (Brooklyn, New York)
- Genre: Garage punk
- Length: 33:16
- Label: Crypt
- Producer: Mike Mariconda

New Bomb Turks chronology
Destroy-Oh-Boy! (1993)	Information Highway Revisited (1994)

Destroy-Oh-Boy! is the debut album by the American garage punk band New Bomb Turks. It was released in 1993 by Crypt Records. The album has received positive reviews from critics.

== Production ==
Destroy-Oh-Boy! was recorded at Coyote Studios in Brooklyn, New York. All songs on the album are credited to the New Bomb Turks with the exception of the song "Mr. Suit", a cover of the British punk rock band Wire's song from their debut album Pink Flag (1977).

Matt Reber, the band's bassist, recalled that he "didn't think anyone would like" the album. Vocalist Eric Davidson said that he "figured, for sure, it would be stacked in the back of Used Kids Records in Columbus and they'd be putting them out in the dollar bins, every couple of months."

== Reception ==
Professional ratings
Review scores
Source	Rating
AllMusic	4.5/5 stars

Despite the band's notions, Destroy-Oh-Boy! was released to what AllMusic declared "universally great reviews". Reviewing the album in 1993, Spin critic Chuck Eddy complimented New Bomb Turks as "the only band I can think of lately that even attempts to play [punk rock] as the rock'n'roll it was meant to be, and that counts for something". The same year, Alternative Press concluded that "suddenly, not only have both prole-threat punk bashery and destructo-rock found fresh voices, they've been melded into a seamless new terror all its own". Maximum Rocknroll considered it the best punk album since 1988. Trouser Press concluded that "the Turks seem most drawn to the fanboy-as-theorist-as-degenerate-rocker spirit of the Dictators". Mark Deming of AllMusic, in a retrospective review, called Destroy-Oh-Boy! "the kind of full-on flamethrower album that could make the most jaded cynic believe once again in the curative powers of punk rock".

== Track listing ==
All lyrics are written by Eric Davidson, except where noted; all music is composed by The New Bomb Turks.

No.	Title	Length
1.	"Born Toulouse-Lautrec"	2:33
2.	"Tail Crush"	2:34
3.	"Up for a Downslide"	2:26
4.	"Tattooed Apathetic Boys"	2:24
5.	"Dragstrip Riot"	3:35
6.	"We Give a Rat's Ass"	1:01
7.	"Runnin' on Go"	2:11
8.	"Long Gone Sister"	1:46
9.	"Mr. Suit" (Robert Gotobed, Graham Lewis, Colin Newman, Bruce Gilbert)	2:57
10.	"Sucker Punch"	3:30
11.	"I Want My Baby...Dead?!"	1:37
12.	"I'm Weak"	3:26
13.	"Tryin' to Get By"	2:06
14.	"Cryin' into the Beer of a Drunk Man"	2:03

The LP version includes "Spinnin' Clock" after "Tattooed Apathetic Boys"; "Cryin' into the Beer of a Drunk Man" is omitted on the LP, but appears as the b-side on the "Dragstrip Riot" 7-inch single. Also a 7-inch single (red vinyl) of "I'm Weak" was released with a B-side cover of The Rolling Stones "Summer Romance" on Get Hip records in 1993. A version of the album also includes the songs "Let's Dress Up the Naked Truth" and "Hapless Attempt".

== Personnel ==
New Bomb Turks

- Eric Davidson – vocals
- Jim Weber – guitar
- Matt Reber – bass guitar
- Bill Randt – drums

Production

- Mike Mariconda – producer
- Albert Caiati – engineer
