= Fabulous Disaster (band) =

American punk rock band

- Origin: San Francisco, California, United States
- Genres: Punk rock; pop punk
- Years active: 1998–2007
- Labels: I Scream; Evil Eye; Pink and Black
- Members: Lynda Mandolyn; Squeaky; Sally Disaster; Lizzie Boredom
- Past members: Cinder Block; "Mr Nancy" Kravitz; Laura Litter
- Website: http://www.fabulous-disaster.com

Fabulous Disaster was an all-female American punk rock band founded in 1998 in San Francisco, California.

== History ==
Fabulous Disaster formed in San Francisco in 1998 and released their debut album, Pretty Killers (Evil Eye Records, 1999). In 2000, they signed to Fat Wreck Chords' Pink and Black imprint. They toured heavily to promote their second album, Put Out or Get Out. They released Panty Raid! in 2003 and toured with bands such as NOFX, The Mad Caddies, The Briefs, The Real McKenzies, and The Dickies. While on the Fat Wreck Tour of 2001, they won the *SF Weekly* Best Punk Band award. They released the EP I'm a Mess in 2004, featuring a new lineup. Subsequent touring followed, and they released split EPs with European bands such as OC Toons and Zinc. The band's fourth full-length album, Love At First Fight, was released in May 2007; the band split up later that year.

== Discography ==
- Pretty Killers (1999)
- Put Out or Get Out (2001)
- Panty Raid! (2003)
- I'm a Mess EP (2004)
- Awesome Fromage – split CD with OC Toons (2006)
- Love at First Fight (2007)

== Members ==
- Lynda Mandolyn – lead vocals
- Sally Disaster – drums
- Squeaky – guitar, vocals
- Lizzie Boredom – bass
- Laura Litter – lead vocals (original lineup)
- "Mr Nancy" Kravitz – bass (original lineup)
- Theo Logian – bass (touring)
- Mattowar – bass (touring)
