= Cinder Block (musician) =

American punk rock singer

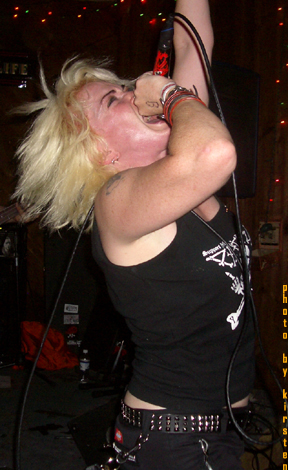
- Cinder Block performing with Retching Red, 2005

Background information
- Also known as: Cynthia Bischoff, Cinder Bischoff
- Born: Cynthia Morgan; May 13, 1961 (age 65)
- Origin: Lincoln, Nebraska, US
- Genres: Hardcore punk, punk rock
- Instruments: Vocals
- Years active: 1983–present
- Labels: Fat Wreck Chords, Lookout! Records, Rodent Popsicle Records
- Member of: Tilt
- Formerly of: Prick, Retching Red, Fabulous Disaster, The Pathogens

Cinder Block (born Cynthia Morgan, May 13, 1961) is an American punk rock vocalist and visual artist. Cinder is most well-known as the lead vocalist for Tilt, a Fat Wreck Chords punk band.

== Early life ==
Cinder was raised in Nebraska. She categorized herself as being a "festival-goer" and a "concert-goer" in her adolescence. She was a part of Nebraska's punk rock scene in her youth and often visited a venue there called the Drumstick and the Zoobar, where well-known Los Angeles-based bands such as X and Meat Puppets would perform. Cinder cited those bands as influences that inspired her to pursue her own career as a punk rock musician. She also felt inspired by the rebellion, energy, and artistry in punk rock. She began songwriting in the 1970s, and she started her first band in 1983.

Cinder has cited theater as an inspiration to her. Growing up, she enjoyed plays by Sam Shepard and William Shakespeare, as well as existential poetry and the Beat Generation. In the mid-1980s, Cinder wrote a "punk rock opera," based on the mythological story of Agamemnon, called Hubris. She earned a Bachelor of Fine Arts in Theater Arts, acting, and directing from the University of Nebraska–Lincoln.

Cinder moved to the San Francisco Bay Area around 1987. She also credited the Bay Area scene for heavily influencing her, and in a 1999 interview, she stated that she still felt like she was a part of the Bay Area scene.

== Tilt ==
Tilt was mainly active from 1992 to 2001, during which period Cinder Block was the lead vocalist and lyricist for the band. She also assumed bookkeeping responsibilities in the band. At one point during the band's tenure, Cinder Block was the only female artist on the Fat Wreck Chords label, although by 1998, Fat Wreck had signed one other female-fronted band, The Muffs. As one of very few female punk rock vocalists, Cinder cited difficulties that she encountered throughout her career, including one time when a male fan approached her and told her that she would have attracted a larger and more passionate crowd if she had been a male vocalist. Cinder partially attributed Tilt's initial breakup in 2001 to the increasing success and demands of Cinder Block, Inc., the merchandising company she founded with her former husband, Tilt guitarist Jeffrey Bischoff.

In 2015, Cinder reunited with Tilt to play a one-off reunion show during a festival to celebrate the 25th anniversary of Fat Wreck Chords. In 2017, Tilt reunited again for another show at 924 Gilman Street, a music venue in Berkeley, California.

== Other musical projects ==
Before Tilt, Cinder was in a band called Prick. The band was not the first Cinder had ever joined, but it was the first to ever have any releases.

She sang with the all-female band Fabulous Disaster for a short time. She would then go on to form the hardcore punk band Retching Red in 2004. Since 2018, she has sung for The Pathogens, although The Pathogens are on a temporary hiatus due to Cinder relocating from California to perform in a family band called The Morgans.

Cinder worked for Fabula magazine and Punk Rock Confidential.

Her lyrics typically focus on left wing political themes and other irreverent topics. Some of her songs have feminist themes.

== Business endeavors ==
Cinder Block and Jeffery Bischoff founded a licensing and merchandising store, Cinder Block, Inc, in 1989. Cinder Block, Inc. was based in Oakland, California, and started in a warehouse as Cinder and Bischoff's means of financially supporting their burgeoning music careers. One of their earliest clients was the punk rock band AFI. In 1997, Cinder Block, Inc. had 14 full-time employees and was responsible for printing shirts and merchandise for Vans Warped Tour. By 2005, Jeffery Bischoff was the president of Cinder Block, Inc. At its peak, Cinder Block had over 300 clients; some of the store's most high-profile clients included the alternative rock artists The Smashing Pumpkins, Radiohead, R.E.M., and Phil Collins. Aside from merchandising, Cinder Block, Inc. also offered full tour service, e-commerce, ticketing, and business development for its clients.

In 2009, Transom Capital Group, a Los Angeles-based equity firm, acquired Cinder Block, Inc. from Jeffery Bischoff, who, by that point, only retained partial ownership of the business. In March 2014, Anschutz Entertainment Group and Transom Capital Group announced that they would merge BandMerch and Cinder Block, Inc. into one standalone company that would continue under the name BandMerch. By that point, Cinder Block, Inc.'s CEO was Jason Greene.

== Personal life ==
She was married to Jeffery Bischoff. They have since divorced. Cinder makes silkscreens and has been doing so for almost two decades. In her free time, she enjoys yoga. In a 1998 interview, she stated that her doctors were "about 90% sure" she had multiple sclerosis, but yoga helped alleviate her symptoms.

Cinder has named Billie Holiday, Édith Piaf, Nina Hagen, Exene Cervenka, and Lady Gaga as vocal inspirations.

Cinder is in recovery for drug and alcohol addiction, a process which she began in the 1990s. The first record she wrote, released, and performed on tour after achieving sobriety was Tilt's Collect 'Em All. About her recovery, she stated in a July 1998 interview that it was difficult to maintain sobriety while touring, but that "[recovery is] the best thing I ever did. Some people think when artists sober up that they have nothing more to say. It's just made my writing more intense and my music more angry, I think. It's made performance much much more enjoyable, because I can put so much more energy into it. I've been on tour before where I've been so run down from just a little bit of drinking. I've been struggling so hard just to get through the set that I haven't been able to concentrate on the ideas that I'm trying to get across, or making a connection with the people on stage or with the audience. And now I can. It's a fucking miracle; it's a gift. It's one of the gifts of recovery that I'm so glad that I finally surrendered to."
