= Razorcake =

Los Angeles nonprofit and punk fanzine

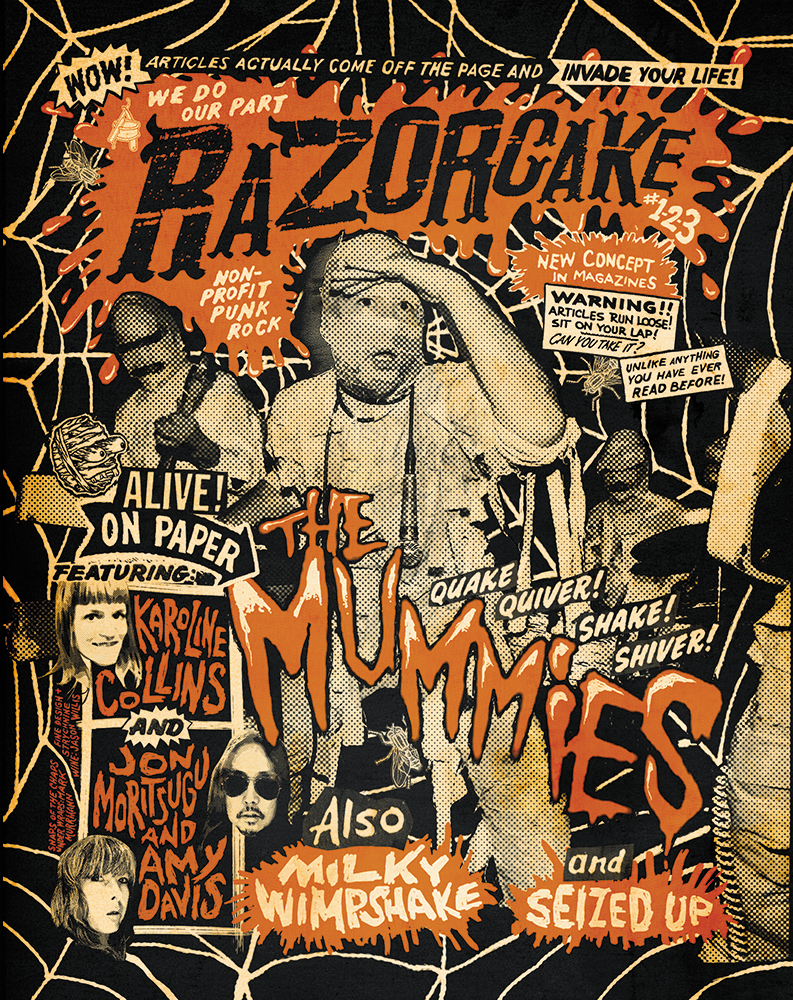
- Razorcake Issue #123
- Executive Director / Editor-in-chief: Todd Taylor
- Managing Editor: Daryl Gussin
- Frequency: Bi-monthly
- Circulation: 6,400
- Founder: Todd Taylor, Sean Carswell
- Founded: 2001
- Country: USA
- Based in: Los Angeles
- Website: razorcake.org

Razorcake is a 501(c)(3) non-profit organization that publishes the Razorcake fanzine, a DIY punk rock fanzine published bi-monthly out of Los Angeles, California. It was co-founded by Todd Taylor (former Flipside managing editor) and Sean Carswell (author and Gorsky Press co-founder) in 2001.

== History ==
As Flipside was going under, Taylor decided that he did not want to cease to write about music. His initial idea was to create a webzine instead of a print zine because of financial restraints. Taylor told Carswell, during a trip to Florida, about his plan for a webzine. Carswell suggested that a print edition be produced. Taylor concurred, stipulating that Carswell needed to move to Los Angeles in order to assist with the production of the fanzine.

The name for both editions was chosen while searching for a domain name. Many of the 300 possibilities, such as "Born to Rock" and "Barbed Wire Asshole", were either taken, too expensive, or thought to be a name that "would trap [them]". "Razorcake" was suggested by Katy (also known as KT), a friend of Taylor and Carswell. The name was chosen since it meant nothing and was economical, and Skinny Dan (also known as Danny) set up the website at www.razorcake.com.

March 2001 saw the first issue of the print edition of Razorcake. The inaugural issue was the only one to bear a newsprint cover. Every issue since the first has had a glossy cover. As opposed to the cover, the focus of the content within Razorcake has never changed. Also, the fanzine's circulation has more than doubled (to 6,400) since the first issue. May 2026 saw the 152nd issue of Razorcake, making it the longest continually printed DIY punk zine in the United States still in operation.

=== Non-profit status ===
In late 2005, Razorcake was approved by the IRS as an official 501(c)(3) non-profit organization. Razorcake is America's only fanzine dedicated to punk to obtain nonprofit status. The new organization combined the Gorsky Press and the zine, and is now officially called Razorcake/Gorsky Press, Inc. This meant that not one person could individually benefit from Razorcake. All money earned goes back into day-to-day operations and keeping Razorcake afloat. Razorcake wanted to show that its business model was out in the open in order to demonstrate that a sustainable business could be ethical, fair, and true to its ideals long after its first issue.

=== Mission statement ===
Razorcake provides consistent coverage of do-it-yourself punk culture that you won't find anywhere else. Razorcake believes in positive, progressive, community-friendly DIY punk. "We do our part."

DIY punk culture is often misrepresented, misunderstood, and the target of corporate exploitation. Razorcake supports a legit community of punk music and culture as the only bona fide 501(c)(3) non-profit music magazine in America.

Razorcake's bi-monthly fanzine is a one-of-a-kind resource for the DIY punk community. Over the years, Razorcake has developed this resource to help document every facet of this culture. The Razorcake Gorsky umbrella also includes book publishing, record pressing, live shows and readings, and a thriving web presence that maintains weekly podcasts, webcomics, and videos.

Razorcake's open participation policy means anyone can become a contributor. Currently, Razorcake offers a forum for over 180 long-term independent volunteer writers, photographers, illustrators, and musicians from around the world. Razorcake takes pride in the DIY punk scenes and represents them internationally. Razorcake also distributes the magazine to over twenty countries.

DIY punk is an exciting, evolving culture that can thrive outside of corporate interests. Razorcake's goal is to continue operating a modern framework where this community of independent, DIY punk can continue.

== Ethics ==
From the interviews it runs (contributors interview bands based solely on their appreciation), to the advertising allowed (no major labels and "below-market price" advertising to those in the DIY community), to the method of the zine's distribution (not via chain stores, but directly to individual stores and people), Razorcake operates outside of the corporate structures that a traditional music magazine would embrace. With only two people on staff, all of the material offered in both editions of Razorcake is donated.

== Content ==
Razorcake sees itself as a constant celebration and criticism of contemporary DIY punk rock. Every piece that Razorcake runs is exclusive. Razorcake provides long-format, detailed interviews with contemporary punk bands (including Martha, Toys That Kill, Soul Glo, Shang-A-Lang, The Ergs!, The Marked Men, Tenement (band)) and with punk pioneers (such as The Adolescents, Dead Moon, Kathleen Hanna, Jello Biafra, Ian Mackaye, Joe Lally, Penelope Houston), and a variety of musicians under the DIY punk umbrella (Hasil Adkins, Superchunk, Kenneth Higney, At The Drive-In, The Melvins, Pere Ubu).

Razorcake not only interviews bands from all over the globe (Gorilla Angreb, Career Suicide, Amyl and the Sniffers), but punk-affiliated artists—photographers (Edward Colver, Bev Davies), comic artists (Nate Powell), movie directors (Alex Cox dir. of Repo Man (film), Curtis Harrington), actors (Kevin Murphy (actor) from Mystery Science Theater 3000), writers (Brad Warner, Nancy Barile, Erika Dawn Lyle)—and political thinkers such as Howard Zinn, Christian Parenti, Noam Chomsky, and Candace Falk and Gary Pateman (curators of the Emma Goldman Paper Project).

=== Los Angeles area coverage ===
Razorcake is dedicated to an ongoing attention to its own roots and sections of Los Angeles County (especially East Los Angeles, the San Gabriel Valley, South Los Angeles) and Tijuana. The fanzine has interviewed a number of bands and individuals from these areas, as well as published articles related to this geographic area.

==== Articles ====
- A History of East LA Punk
- East LA Family Tree
- We Were There: Voices from L.A. Punk's First Wave (Oral history roundtable hosted by Alice Bag)

==== Eastside Punks ====
A documentary film series directed by Jimmy Alvarado featuring bands from Los Angeles's Eastside.

1. Thee Undertakers
2. The Brat
3. Stains
4. Nervous Gender
5. Our Band Sucks

==== Interviews ====
- Alice Bag
- The Alley Cats
- Amir H. Fallah
- Apostasis
- Aztlan Underground
- The Brat
- Bümbkläät
- Cancer Christ
- Candace Hansen
- Carnage Asada
- Chip Kinman
- Chris Dodge
- Circle One
- Club sCUM
- Crisis Actor
- Crom
- Despise You
- DFMK
- Diane Gamboa
- Dimber
- Edward Colver
- Emily’s Sassy Lime
- Felix Reyes (Big Crux, Lives Halt)
- Generacion Suicida
- The Groans
- Gross Polluter
- Grudgepacker
- Guilty Hearts
- Gun Club
- Hex Code
- Hot Load
- The Humblers
- The Insect Surfers
- It's Casual
- Jake Smith (Crucifix)
- James Spooner
- Jacqui Pierce
- Jeff Rosenstock
- John Curry
- John E. Miner
- Justin Maurer
- Keith Morris
- Kid Congo Powers
- La Tuya
- The Linda Lindas
- Lisa Fancher
- Los Illegals
- Louis Jacinto
- Lxs Cochinxs
- MariNaomi
- Melina Abdullah
- Melissa Cody
- Mike Watt
- Mick Collins
- The Mormons
- Moxiebeat
- Muscle Beach
- Myriam Gurba
- Nervous Gender
- Oginee Viamontes
- Ollin
- Patrick O'Neil
- Pedal Strike
- Phranc
- The Pinkz
- The Pretty Flowers
- The Runts
- Shizu Saldamando
- The Sidewalk Project
- Slaughterhouse
- Snakes
- Social Conflict
- S.O.H.
- The Stains
- Sunny War
- Terminal A
- Trap Girl
- Tsubasa Muratani
- Violencia
- The Vulturas
- The Warriors
- Thee Undertakers
- Vaneza Calderón
- Wacko

==== Podcasts ====
- East Los Angeles Punk, Part 1
- East Los Angeles Punk, Part 2

=== One Punk's Guide to... ===
Starting with issue 46, Razorcake began a series of articles titled "One Punk's Guide to..." wherein writers give personal takes on various topics.

1. One Punk's Guide to... ...Or How I Learned to Stop Worrying About Punk and Started Loving Music
2. One Punk's Guide to Otis Redding
3. One Punk's Guide to Professional Soccer, Book Publishing, and Corporate Ideology
4. One Punk's Guide to Science Fiction
5. One Punk's Travel Guide to Indonesia
6. One Punk's Guide to Silent Films
7. One Punk's Guide to Poetry
8. One Punk's Guide to Bizarro Fiction
9. One Punk's Guide to Bike Touring
10. One Punk's Guide to Pinball
11. One Punk's Guide to Outlaw Country
12. One Punk's Guide to African Politics
13. One Punk's Guide to Christian Punk
14. One Punk's Guide to Rap Music
15. One Punk's Guide to Pynchon Novels
16. Some Punks’ Guide to Fitness
17. One Punk's Guide to Gardening
18. One Punk's Guide to Starting Your Own DIY Record Label
19. One Punk's Movie Guide
20. One Punk's Guide to Patrick Cowley
21. One Punk's Guide to the Ramones
22. One Punk's Guide to Professional Wrestling
23. One Punk's Guide to Patrick Cowley
24. One Punk's Guide to Free Jazz
25. One Punk's Guide to Crime Novels
26. One Punk's Guide to a Vegan Diet
27. One Punk's Guide to the Dark Ages
28. One Punk's Guide to Standup Comedy
29. One Punk's Guide to Climate Change
30. One Punk's Guide to John Waters
31. One Punk's Guide to Black Musicians
32. One Punk's Guide to Sludge Metal
33. One Punk's Guide to Surf Music
34. One Punk's Guide to the Culture Industry
35. One Punk's Guide to the Emergency Room
36. One Punk's Guide to Digital Sex Work
37. One Punk’s Guide to Pollinator Conservation
38. Two Punks' Guide to Community Planning
39. One Punk's Guide to Therapy
40. One Punk’s Guide to Vintage Car Restoration
41. One Punk's Guide to Pickleball
42. One Punk's Guide to Exploring Punk's Relationship with Alcohol
43. One Punk’s Guide to Hurling
44. One Punk’s Guide to Sobriety
45. One Punk’s Guide to Volunteering at an Animal Shelter

Additionally, some Guides have only been published on Razorcake's website.

1. One Punk's Guide to Surviving an All-Dayer
2. One Punk's Guide to Getting on with It
3. One Canadian Punk's Guide to the Tragically Hip
4. One Punk’s Guide to Jazz Saxophonist Aubrey “Brew” Moore

== Contributors ==
Besides Todd Taylor and Sean Carswell, former Flipside writers Donofthedead, Jimmy Alvarado, Designated Dale, Kat Jetson, The Rhythm Chicken, Jessica T., Nardwuar the Human Serviette, and Rich Mackin all wrote for the premier issue. Many of them remain with the publication, but Razorcake also has a raft of writers who are well known in the DIY punk rock community as zinesters, musicians, and artists including:

- Billups Allen
- Erik Baskauskas
- Tim Brooks
- Lauren Denitzio
- Michael T. Fournier
- Michelle Cruz Gonzales
- Louis Jacinto
- Chris Boarts Larson
- Kiyoshi Nakazawa
- MariNaomi
- Rev. Nørb
- the-rhythm-chicken
- Keith Rosson
- Jim Ruland
- Marcos Siref

== Gorsky Press ==
Gorsky Press, the book publishing arm of Razorcake, founded by Sean Carswell and Felizon Vidad, predated both the Razorcake website and zine. Its mission is similar to Razorcake in that it focuses on high quality material from marginalized and disenfranchised writers. Gorsky Press has released books by underground writers such as Patricia Geary, Bucky Sinister, James Jay, and Jennifer Whiteford.

=== Bibliography ===
- Drinks for the Little Guy – by Sean Carswell
- Dear Mr. Mackin... - by Rev. Richard J. Mackin
- The Other Canyon – by Patricia Geary
- Glue and Ink Rebellion – by Sean Carswell
- The Undercards – by James Jay
- Punch & Pie – edited by Felizon Vidad and Todd Taylor
- Thank You for Your Continued Interest – by Rev. Richard J. Mackin
- Born to Rock – by Todd Taylor
- The Snake Pit Book – by Ben Snakepit
- Whiskey & Robots – by Bucky Sinister
- Guru Cigarettes – by Patricia Geary
- Barney's Crew – by Sean Carswell
- Big Lonesome – by Jim Ruland
- Grrrl – by Jennifer Whiteford
- Shirley Wins – by Todd Taylor
- All Blacked Out & Nowhere to Go – by Bucky Sinister
- Strange Toys – by Patricia Geary
- The Hanging Gardens of Split Rock – by Mike Faloon
- The Journeymen – by James Jay
- The Blood and the Bone and the Flesh of It All: New & Selected Poems – by Jim Simmerman (Author), James Jay (Editor), Miles Waggener (Editor)
- The Other Night at Quinn's — by Mike Faloon

== Website ==
In 2006, razorcake.com was revamped. To reflect its non-profit status, the website's official url became www.razorcake.org. The website provides an almost wholly different set of content than the zine, while retaining the same focus on DIY punk rock by publishing live reviews, photos, columns, and interviews different from those appearing in the print edition.

By 2026, the razorcake.org website had been updated over 42,880 times, primarily by the posting of individual record reviews. The website is updated with a new home page story every day. Also, Razorcake made early issues available on the site in .pdf format for free. March 2008 saw the launching of Razorcake's first set of podcasts. For the first time since its inception, people could hear directly from Razorcake the music on which Razorcake focuses.

Razorcake also distributes various DIY items from their website, such as records, zines, and books.

== Razorcake Records ==
In 2007, the Razorcake Records label was launched. Razorcake Records is also a non-profit venture. It conscientiously selects bands from the DIY punk rock community that share the same values as Razorcake. The first two releases were part of what Razorcake calls "The Sister Series."

=== Sister Series ===
The Sister Series is a cultural exchange that aims to connect bands from different areas. This is done by simultaneously releasing two separate 7" records by two similar independent bands, with each band providing some originals and cover of a song by the other band. Bands that have been featured in the Sister Series include Tiltwheel (San Diego) and Toys That Kill (San Pedro, CA), The Arrivals (Chicago, IL) and Grabass Charlestons (Gainesville, FL), and The Hex Dispensers (Austin, TX) and Young Offenders (San Francisco, CA).

=== Discography ===
- Tiltwheel – The Heavens Declare the Glory 7" reissue (co-release with Accident Prone)
- Toys That Kill – Sister Series 7" (paired with Tiltwheel)
- Tiltwheel – Sister Series 7" (paired with Toys That Kill)
- God Equals Genocide – The World Is Wearin’ Me Down 7"
- Tiltwheel – Battle Hymns for the Recluse Youth LP + CD reissue (co-release with Accident Prone)
- Killer Dreamer - 1,000 Years of Servitude LP + CD (co-release with 45 RPM Records)
- God Equals Genocide – Life of Doubt 7" (co-release with Dirt Cult)
- Grabass Charlestons – Sister Series 7" (paired with The Arrivals)
- The Arrivals – Sister Series 7" (paired with Grabass Charlestons)
- Shang-A-Lang/God Equals Genocide – Split 7"
- God Equals Genocide - It Wasn't Made for Us 7" (co-release with Recess Records)
- The Pine Hill Haints - Black Casket 7" (co-release with 45 RPM Records)
- Dan Padilla - As the Ox Plows LP (co-release with Dirt Cult Records and It's Alive Records)
- The Hex Dispensers – Sister Series 7" (paired with Young Offenders)
- Young Offenders – Sister Series 7" (paired with Hex Dispensers)
- Crusades – The Sun Is Down and the Night Is Riding In LP (co-release with It's Alive Records)
- Blood Buddies - Self-titled 7"
- God Equals Genocide - Rattled Minds LP (co-release with Dirt Cult Records)
- Summer Vacation - Condition LP
- White Murder - Self-tiled LP
- Mind Spiders - Sister Series 7" (paired with Lenguas Largas)
- Lenguas Largas - Sister Series 7" (paired with Mind Spiders)
- Chantey Hook - Underground 7"
- Cuntifiers - Under the Rainbow CD + download
- Pinned in Place - Ghostwritten By LP
- Desidia - Harto free download
