= The Blind Wink =

Studio album by Tenement
- Released: 2011
- Recorded: January–September 2011
- Genre: Pop punk
- Length: 27:00
- Label: Cowabunga, Deranged Records
- Producer: Amos Pitsch

Tenement chronology
Napalm Dream (2011)	The Blind Wink (2011)	Bruised Music, Volume 1 (2015)

Professional ratings
Review scores
Source	Rating
Scene Point Blank	3.5/5 stars

The Blind Wink is an album by Appleton, Wisconsin-based rock group Tenement. It was properly released in December 2011 by Chicago hardcore punk label Cowabunga Records, following a cassette that the band released themselves for a West Coast tour in January 2011. It was re-issued in 2016 by Canadian hardcore punk record label, Deranged Records.

Wisconsin country-rock band Dusk covered "Hey, Soozie" on their debut self titled Don Giovanni Records album in 2018. English rock band Martha covered "Dreaming Out Loud" as a b-side to their 2022 Dirtnap Records single, "Beat Perpetual".

== Reception ==
Razorcake: "This record is a beautiful oddity. While it might not have been as essential if the impact of Napalm Dream was still in the air, as a continuation of that record, it feels just as important. In a perfect world, Tenement would release an LP every year, and the awe-struck astonishment of this band’s creative capability would last forever. On this outing they may stray further from the Midwest punk comfort zone. But who doesn’t like to get a little adventurous? Due to hours and hours of over-analyzing records and bands, sometimes it’s hard to see past the clichés and trends. But, in the most refreshing way possible, this music makes me feel like a human."

Seattle PI: "...Tenement take an experimental and boundary-pushing approach to solid rock and folk songwriting."

Scene Point Blank: "With the newer record, the band explores similar songwriting—but in a very distinct and growing way."

== Track listing ==
All compositions by Amos Pitsch.

1. "Viscous"
2. "Dreaming Out Loud #2"
3. "Medical Curiosity"
4. "Senile"
5. "Unreal"
6. "Lost Love Star Lust"
7. "The Pleasure We Get (In Scratching an Itch)"
8. "Cage That Keeps You In"
9. "Hey, Soozie"
10. "Hard to Say"
11. "(Messy Endings) in Middle America"
