= The Self-Titled Album =

Studio album by Tenement
- Released: July 1, 2016
- Recorded: February 2015
- Genre: Punk rock
- Length: 18:00
- Label: Forward, Deranged
- Producer: Amos Pitsch

Tenement chronology
Predatory Headlights (2015)	The Self-Titled Album (2016)

The Self-Titled Album is an album by Appleton, Wisconsin-based rock group Tenement. It was co-released in July 2016 by Forward Records and Deranged Records, following the release of a cassette version that the band wrote and recorded in the span of a week ahead of an East Coast tour in 2015.

== Reception ==
The New York Times: "It doesn’t have the same power as a self-contained document of the double album, but it satisfies the urge to hear more of Mr. Pitsch’s rough perfectionism."

Sorry State Records: "The Self-Titled Album also feels kind of disorienting, but with a considerably shorter running length it at least gives off the surface impression of being more digestible. If you never liked Tenement before, I doubt that The Self-Titled Album is going to be the record that flips you since the rather slick production and Amos's distinctive singing style style still fly in the face of punk's cult of lo-fi. However, if you're a Tenement fan (particularly of their post-Napalm Dream material), this is an essential record, more immediate and, in a way at least, even more adventurous and free than Predatory Headlights."

In an article referring to Tenement albums as 'unsteady affairs', Columbus Alive called The Self-Titled Album 's "Lonesome Crying Eyes" a 'tear-in-your-beer ballad' and "The Strangest Couple In Love" a 'hooky, driving pop-rock number' while concluding that Amos Pitsch tends to channel Paul Westerberg in his 'fondness for extremes'.

== Track listing ==
All compositions by Amos Pitsch

1. "Everyone To Love You"
2. "Underworld Hotel"
3. "Witches In A Ritual"
4. "Lonesome Crying Eyes"
5. "Your Shadowed Alleyways"
6. "The Strangest Couple In Love"
7. "Roads Of Home"
