= Brutal Knights =

Canadian punk band

- Origin: Toronto, Ontario, Canada
- Genres: Hardcore punk
- Years active: 2006–2010
- Labels: Deranged; P Trash; Perpetrator; Riff Raff; Spin the Bottle
- Members: Nick Flanagan; Katie G Warrior; Randy "Jon" Sharron; John Power; El Dmang; Daniella Constanzo

Brutal Knights are a Canadian punk band formed in 2006 in Toronto, Ontario. Brutal Knights are also known for their humorous lyrics, written by vocalist Nick Flanagan. Brutal Knights, along with Fucked Up, Career Suicide, and Terminal State, were part of a burgeoning hardcore punk scene in Toronto. Flanagan is a comedian, and sometimes performs stand-up at their shows. According to Flanagan, guitarist Jon Sharron writes most of the music.

In 2006, they were voted "Best Punk Band" by Toronto's Now Magazine. In 2010, the band has been described as "the most energetic revivalist hardcore act" in Toronto.

The Brutal Knights played their final show in December 2010, in Montreal, Quebec.

== Discography ==
Albums

- Blown 2 Completion (LP/CD, 2010, Deranged)
- Living By Yourself (LP/CD, 2008, Deranged / P. Trash)
- Feast of Shame (CD, 2007, Deranged)
- The Pleasure Is All Thine (LP/CD, 2006, Deranged)

Singles and EPs

- Total Rebellion (EP, 2009, P. Trash Records)
- My Life, My Fault (EP, 7", 2008, Spin the Bottle)
- "Breakdown" (7", 2007, Perpetrator)
- Life Ain't Cool (EP, 7", 2007, Riff Raff)
- Not Fun (EP, 7", 2007, Deranged)
- Terrible Evenings (EP, 7", 2007, P. Trash)
- "T.B.S.L. Baby", Split (with Western Dark) (7", 2005, Classic Bar)
