= Napalm Dream =

Studio album by Tenement
- Released: June 30, 2011
- Recorded: March 2009 to June 2011
- Genre: Pop punk
- Length: 33:00
- Label: Mandible
- Producer: Justin Perkins, Amos Pitsch

Tenement chronology
Napalm Dream (2011)	The Blind Wink (2011)

Professional ratings
Review scores
Source	Rating
Punknews	4.5/5 stars
Scene Point Blank	4/5 stars

Napalm Dream is an album by Appleton, Wisconsin-based rock group, Tenement. It was originally released by Brooklyn, New York punk label Mandible Records in 2011. In 2012, it was reissued as a deluxe double cassette box set by Drugged Conscience Records. The box set included the album in its entirety on one tape, and the album's demos on the accompanying tape. It also included a booklet; hand made by the band themselves. Limited to 100 copies, it sold quickly and was soon reissued on cassette again by Fullerton, California's Burger Records. In 2012, Napalm Dream was ranked #381 on The Village Voice 's Pazz & Jop critics poll.

Maximumrocknroll included Napalm Dream in their "The Best Of The 2010s" feature; adding: "...Tenement is not only the most creative and enduring band of that moment, but also transcends any reductive reading as ’Mats revival” (or whatever)."

English rock band Martha covered "Dreaming Out Loud" as a b-side to their 2022 Dirtnap Records single, "Beat Perpetual".

== Reception ==
Punknews: "What does it mean to live in the Midwest, to grow up in a small, dead-end town overshadowed by a nearby metropolis? Appleton, Wisconsin's Tenement seem to provide an answer on Napalm Dream, which embodies a particular Midwest sound while creating its own particular contribution to the cultural landscape/wasteland of Wisconsin and similar areas."

Razorcake: "...This record is absolutely beautiful. It not only sounds completely realized, but it honestly sounds like they’re pushing themselves. It’s urgent, with established foregrounds and backgrounds. Even at its most desperate it’s still catchy. If you’re too tired to listen to music, this record is there. If you’re drinking with friends, this record is there. It also looks like they let a lot of people in on the recording, to which they benefited immensely. Who knew that feedback over piano was so moving? Female backing vocals? The best. Once again, the Midwest produces an earnest, melodic punk classic, but this time they end it with a hardcore rager. This record is important."

In a 2014 "Songs Of The Week" feature for ESPN 's Grantland, music critic Steven Hyden reveals that he'd just discovered Napalm Dream which he describes as "really great in-the-red pop-punk in the vein of Hüsker Dü and the Descendents" adding: "I’m an idiot because I was asleep until now. Don’t be an idiot like me."

Chicago Reader called Napalm Dream "perfected fuzzy midwestern pop punk" and claimed it to be "following in the hardcore-inflected, catchy-as-hell footsteps of Screeching Weasel and Naked Raygun".

NME referred to Napalm Dream as a "Blinding Husker-Du-via-Green-Day pop punk LP" and stated that Tenement turned "witnesses into evangelists" on the national tour following its release.

In a 2020 feature for BrooklynVegan, Jeff Rosenstock cited Napalm Dream as an influence for his album No Dream and said, "I remember hearing this and being blown away that a punk record could sound so fucking good without sounding over produced - and that it was a band in our scene!"

== Track listing ==
All compositions by Amos Pitsch except where noted.

1. "Stupid Werld"
2. "Simple Things (Can Seem So Involved)"
3. "Earwig"
4. "Dreaming Out Loud"
5. "Spit In The Wind"
6. "When Time Caught Up"
7. "City Bus #30"
8. "Rock Eating People"
9. "Blammo"
10. "Running Into Mirrors"
11. "Skyscraper"
12. "A Death In The Family"
13. "Schadenfreude" (Jesse Ponkamo/Amos Pitsch)
