= Paradise (White Lung album) =

Studio album by White Lung
- Released: May 6, 2016
- Genre: Punk rock
- Length: 28:24
- Label: Domino
- Producer: Lars Stalfors

White Lung chronology
Deep Fantasy (2014)	Paradise (2016)	Premonition (2022)

Paradise is the fourth studio album by Canadian punk rock band White Lung. It was released on May 6, 2016. It was produced by Lars Stalfors, who has also produced HEALTH and the Cold War Kids.

== Critical reception ==
Professional ratings
Aggregate scores
Source	Rating
AnyDecentMusic?	7.3/10
Metacritic	79/100
Review scores
Source	Rating
AllMusic	4/5 stars
The A.V. Club	B+
Mojo	4/5 stars
NME	5/5
The Observer	4/5 stars
Pitchfork	8.4/10
Q	3/5 stars
Spin	8/10
Uncut	7/10
Vice	A−

According to review aggregator Metacritic, Paradise has a weighted average of 79 out of 100 based on 25 reviews, indicating "generally favorable reviews".

Consequence of Sound reviewer Dusty Henry described the album as the band's "boldest statement yet". Pitchfork described the album as "more outspoken, more anthemic" than their previous album. NME said: "White Lung have somewhat softened their ragged edges and in doing so have created one of the most compelling albums of the year". AllMusic described the album as a "dynamic, purposeful work by a band coming into its own". The Observer's review noted that the album sounds "positively slowcore compared to their earlier work" but nonetheless remarked that "much of Paradise races past in an alluring blur of distortion and melody". The A.V. Club said the band "stretch the seams of punk" with this album. The Brooklyn Vegan named Paradise the number one new album of the week. Drowned in Sound describe it as an "altogether more composed and melodic album".

Alternately, Under The Radar reviewer Ed McMenamin claimed "The band say they wanted to sound "2016" on Paradise, and to vanquish the threadbare-yet-complimentary references (L7, Babes in Toyland, etc.) critics favored when describing the first three LPs. White Lung, admirably, didn't want to just make another classic rock album like so many of its reform-punk peers. Instead, Paradise sounds contemporary in the worst way, instantly dated and likely soon forgotten by any new audience the band might find."

=== Accolades ===
Publication	Accolade	Year	Rank	Ref.
The A.V. Club	The A.V. Club's Top 50 Albums of 2016	2016	6	
Consequence of Sound	Top 50 Albums of 2016	2016	48	
NME	NME's Albums of the Year 2016	2016	19	
Pitchfork	The 20 Best Rock Albums of 2016	2016	—N/a	
Rolling Stone	50 Best Albums of 2016	2016	31	
Stereogum	The 50 Best Albums of 2016	2016	17	

== Track listing ==
All tracks are written by White Lung with Lars Stalfors.

No.	Title	Length
1.	"Dead Weight"	2:29
2.	"Narcoleptic"	3:18
3.	"Below"	3:37
4.	"Kiss Me When I Bleed"	2:52
5.	"Demented"	2:18
6.	"Sister"	3:24
7.	"Hungry"	2:55
8.	"I Beg You"	3:02
9.	"Vegas"	2:18
10.	"Paradise"	2:11
Total length:		28:24

== Personnel ==
Credits adapted from the liner notes of Paradise.

White Lung

- Mish Barber-Way – vocals
- Kenneth William – guitar, bass
- Anne-Marie Vassiliou – drums

Production

- Lars Stalfors – production, engineering, mixing
- Steven Aguilar – engineering assistant
- Joe LaPorta – mastering

Artwork

- Justin Gradin – artwork, photography (photos of Anne-Marie and Kenny)
- Piper Ferguson – photography (photos of Mish in collage)
- Barber-Way's Mother – photography (photos of Mish as a child in the late 1980s)
