= Bruised Music, Volume 2 =

Compilation album by Tenement
- Released: 2016
- Recorded: 2010–2015
- Genre: Punk/Pop
- Length: 34:00
- Label: Grave Mistake, Toxic Pop
- Producer: Amos Pitsch, Justin Perkins

Tenement chronology
Predatory Headlights (2015)	Bruised Music, Volume 2 (2016)

Professional ratings
Review scores
Source	Rating
Spin Magazine	7/10 stars
Punknews	4.5/5 stars
The Punk Site	3/5 stars

Bruised Music, Volume 2 is a compilation album by Appleton, Wisconsin rock group Tenement, released by Grave Mistake Records and Toxic Pop Records. It is composed of singles and rarities from the years 2010 to 2014.

Iggy Pop played "The Way It All Seems" on the February 16, 2018 episode of his BBC radio show Iggy Confidential and added: "It's kind of aggressive and also kind of perfectly done!"

== Reception ==
Spin: "This is meat-and-potatoes rock with all meat — even the slow songs have that lo-fi-equivalent-of-brickwalled feel. Vol. 2 starts out more promising than Predatory Headlights, but sometime after the unsettled harmonies and piano plinks of “Perverse Universe” give way to the Tortoise-like interlude “Jet Slug,” the repetition becomes inconsequential; just bask in the roil.(...) So a singular band s**tting out smart records at a tour-warrior's pace isn't actually solving a rockist's problem, but their body of work is pretty captivating for a flawed one. Maybe when Tenement gets bored of doing things on their own terms, they'll try their hand at perfection."

Punknews: "Tenement’s musical palette sounds more refined than the initial collection, but it doesn’t paint the group as tame; the songwriting is still fierce and is captivatingly unique.(...)There are very few bands (or none at all) that can pound out a song with so much rhythmic skill; songs take so many unpredictable moves and the drums never stay in one place for more than a few measures.(...)On Bruised Music: Volume 2, every song is a boundary shove for what punk bands could be doing within a genre if they had the willingness to create."

Heartbreaking Bravery reviewed the album at length in 2016; commenting on its individualism; adding:

One part of Tenement’s ethos that never gets enough recognition is their complete and total willingness to disregard their most commercially accessible trappings in favor of intensely bold choices that have left sizable portions of their audiences feeling completely alienated. Whether that’s via the typically downtrodden Realism-Americana-Southern Gothic narrative hybrids of Amos Pitsch’s lyrics, the band’s embrace of John Cage-esque explorations of noise, or their continued refusal to be pigeonholed into any particular genre (much to the chagrin of many purists), they’ve established themselves as their own entity.

Nerdist reviewed the album in April 2016 with an emphasis on the comparison of the recordings to Tenement's live energy, adding: "Few groups seem as honest and raw as Tenement, and that’s part of what makes them so special."

== Track listing ==
All compositions by Amos Pitsch except where noted.

1. "Taking Everything"
2. "Freak Cast in Iron" (Jesse Ponkamo/Amos Pitsch)
3. "The Block Is Safe Again"
4. "Paper Airplanes"
5. "Wouldn't Let You Go"
6. "Perverse Universe"
7. "Jet Slug"
8. "Your Life Or Mine"
9. "Blast Exhaust"
10. "Books On Hell And Sermons On T.V."
11. "The Way It All Seems"
12. "Violent Outlet"
13. "Daylight World"
14. "Your Sway (Keeps the Rot Away)"
