= It's the Evil =

Studio album by White Lung
- Released: June 15, 2010
- Genre: Punk rock
- Length: 24:00
- Label: Deranged

White Lung chronology
It's the Evil (2010)	Sorry (2012)

It's the Evil is the debut studio album by Canadian punk rock band White Lung, released on June 15, 2010, on Deranged Records.

== Track listing ==
All songs written and composed by White Lung

1. "Viva La Rat" – 1:50
2. "Atlanta" – 2:36
3. "Sleep Creep" – 1:54
4. "Two Seen" – 2:55
5. "Elf/546 Kids" – 3:25
6. "Psychoholic" – 1:40
7. "Shoot" – 2:21
8. "Loose Heels" – 1:25
9. "Like Dad" – 2:29
10. "Tale" – 2:00
11. "Wild Failure" – 2:13

== Personnel ==
- Mish Way – vocals
- Kenneth William – guitar
- Grady Mackintosh – bass guitar
- Anne-Marie Vassiliou – drums
