= Sorry (White Lung album) =

Studio album by White Lung
- Released: May 29, 2012
- Genre: Punk rock
- Length: 19:00
- Label: Deranged

White Lung chronology
It's the Evil (2010)	Sorry (2012)	Deep Fantasy (2014)

Singles from Sorry
- 1. "Bag"; 2. "Take the Mirror"; 3. "Glue"

Sorry is the second studio album by Canadian punk rock band White Lung, released on May 29, 2012, on Deranged Records. New Jersey's Aquarian Weekly reported that the album "earned them a hearty critical reception at SXSW".

== Reception ==
Professional ratings
Aggregate scores
Source	Rating
Metacritic	76/100
Review scores
Source	Rating
AllMusic	4/5 stars
The Austin Chronicle	4/5 stars
Beats per Minute	83%
Consequence of Sound	C+
Pitchfork	8/10
PopMatters	(7/29/12) (8/20/12)
Punknews.org	4.5/5 stars

- Rolling Stone named the album one of "The 10 Best Albums of 2012", saying: "Vancouver kids bang through ten bursts of female punk fury in 19 minutes, with Mish Way's hungry yowl leading the charge. Nothing fancy here – you get thrashed, you get bashed, you notice strange bruises all over your shins, then as soon as it's over you press play again."
- NOW Magazine report that the album's "ferocious mix of snarling hooks and hardcore urgency (together, the 10 songs clock in at under 20 minutes) found sympathetic ears at publications as big as Rolling Stone, and suddenly White Lung started getting invites to festivals like NXNE and Pitchfork."

== Track listing ==
All songs written and composed by White Lung

1. "Take the Mirror" – 1:22
2. "St. Dad" – 2:15
3. "Thick Lip" – 1:47
4. "Bag" – 1:49
5. "Bunny" – 2:01
6. "I Rot" – 2:14
7. "Glue" – 2:11
8. "Those Girls" – 2:04
9. "The Bad Way" – 2:00
10. "Deadbeat" – 0:57

== Personnel ==
- Mish Way – vocals
- Kenneth William – guitar
- Grady Mackintosh – bass guitar
- Anne-Marie Vassiliou – drums
