= Bruised Music, Volume 1 =

Compilation album by Tenement
- Released: 2015
- Recorded: September 2006 to March 2009
- Genre: Punk/Pop
- Length: 30:00
- Label: Grave Mistake, Toxic Pop
- Producer: Tyler Ditter, Justin Perkins

Tenement chronology
| The Blind Wink (2011) | Bruised Music, Volume 1 (2015) | Predatory Headlights (2015) |

Professional ratings
Review scores
| Source | Rating |
|---|---|
| Punknews | 4/5 stars |
| Salad Days | 4/5 stars |
| Big Bombo | 8/10 stars |

Bruised Music, Volume 1 is a compilation album by Appleton, Wisconsin rock group Tenement, released by Grave Mistake Records and Toxic Pop Records. It is composed of singles and rarities from the band's first four years. The album was ranked #1170 by The Village Voice on their 2015 Pazz & Jop critics poll.

== Reception ==
Punknews: "Sounding like a darker, more depressed Midwestern version of the Descendents, Tenement’s brand of pop punk is heavier, harder and better than most of their ilk."

Rock Freaks: "...Given the compilation nature of the album, the quality of song varies quite significantly from the more anonymous tracks to the quality songs that make Tenement worth following and checking out especially live. Those on the second half of the record are arguably catchier than on the first half, but it's still mostly a fan release and probably not suitable as the starting point to the band."

Ahead of Bruised Music, Volume 1 's release, Stereogum wrote, "Though the album cover's stark binary palette and vampire-like outstretched claws might bring to mind a Bauhaus coldness, the music owes more to Black Flag than anything remotely post-punk," calling the song Spaghetti Midwestern "a riotous portrait of suburban disillusionment, the American Dream gone awry" and Morning Mouth "a spiraling two and a half minutes of theatrical frustration".

== Track listing ==
All compositions by Amos Pitsch except where noted.

1. "Sitcom Moms"
2. "Spaghetti Midwestern"
3. "The Fire Is Out"
4. "Summer Street, Parts 1 and 2"
5. "Best And Worst Of Times" (Hart Miller/Amos Pitsch)
6. "Pauline"
7. "Icepick"
8. "Goodnight, Rosendale"
9. "Morning Mouth"
10. "Do You Think About Him?"
