= Deep Fantasy =

Studio album by White Lung
- Released: June 17, 2014
- Genre: Punk rock
- Length: 22:05
- Label: Domino
- Producer: Jesse Gander

White Lung chronology
Sorry (2012)	Deep Fantasy (2014)	Paradise (2016)

Deep Fantasy is the third studio album by Canadian punk rock band White Lung. It was released on June 17, 2014. The album was produced by Jesse Gander, who also produced the band's previous album, Sorry.

== Critical reception ==
Professional ratings
Aggregate scores
Source	Rating
AnyDecentMusic?	7.6/10
Metacritic	78/100
Review scores
Source	Rating
AllMusic	3.5/5 stars
Exclaim!	9/10
Financial Times	4/5 stars
The Guardian	4/5 stars
The Irish Times	4/5 stars
NME	7/10
Pitchfork	8.6/10
Q	3/5 stars
Rolling Stone	3.5/5 stars
Spin	8/10

According to review aggregator Metacritic, Deep Fantasy has a weighted average of 78 out of 100 based on 23 reviews, indicating "generally favorable reviews".

In 2016, Rolling Stone listed the album at number 38 on "The 40 Greatest Punk Albums of All-Time", describing it as "Like Black Flag fronted by the bastard daughter of Patti Smith and Stevie Nicks, with each song a nail bomb of desire."

== Track listing ==
1. Drown with the Monster
2. Down It Goes
3. Snake Jaw
4. Face Down
5. I Believe You
6. Wrong Star
7. Just for You
8. Sycophant
9. Lucky One
10. In Your Home
