= White Lung =

Canadian punk rock band

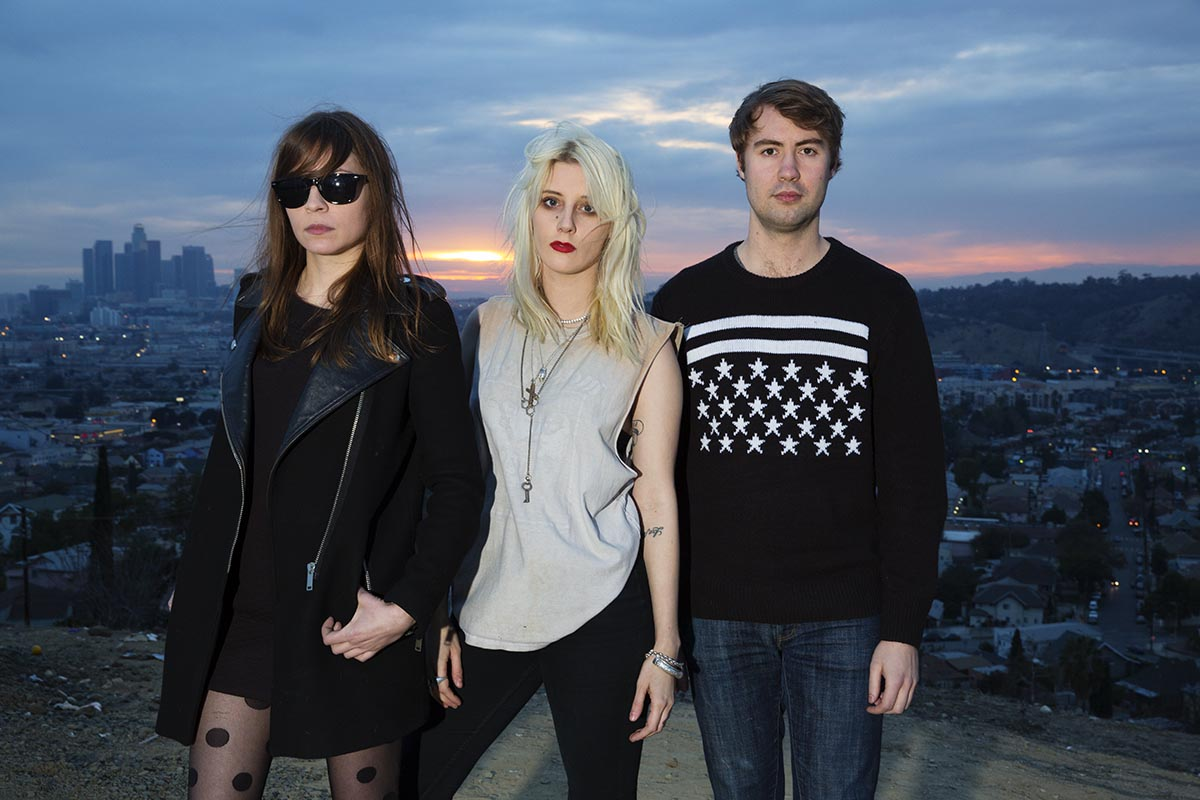
- White Lung in 2014; from left to right: Anne-Marie Vassiliou, Mish Way and Kenneth William

Background information
- Origin: Vancouver, British Columbia, Canada
- Genres: Punk rock; indie rock; riot grrrl
- Years active: 2006–2022
- Labels: Deranged; Domino; Hockey Dad; Sabotage
- Past members: Mish Barber-Way; Kenneth William; Caroline Doyle; Anne-Marie Vassiliou; Natasha Reich; Grady Mackintosh; Hether Fortune; Lindsey Troy
- Website: whitelung.ca

White Lung was a Canadian punk rock band. The band consisted of Mish Barber-Way (vocals), Kenneth William (guitars), and Anne-Marie Vassiliou (drums). They have released two albums on Deranged Records and their latest two on Domino Recording Company. Exclaim! named the band's first full-length album It's the Evil as 2010's punk album of the year. The band was nominated for Punk/Hardcore Artist/Group of the Year at the 2011 Canadian Music Week Indie Awards.

== History ==
White Lung was formed in Vancouver, British Columbia, Canada in 2006. They first attained recognition as one of the standout acts involved with the Vancouver Emergency Room scene. Exclaim! named the band's first full-length album It's the Evil as 2010's punk album of the year. Anne-Marie Vassiliou is an ex-member of the band The Riff Randells.

The band was nominated for Punk/Hardcore Artist/Group of the Year at the 2011 Canadian Music Week Indie Awards. Their second album, Sorry, was released 29 May 2012 to critical acclaim from Spin, Pitchfork, Magnet, Exclaim! and Rolling Stone.

White Lung released their third studio album, Deep Fantasy, on 16 June 2014 through Domino Recording Company. It resulted in increased exposure and the band began to play larger venues. In 2015, the band announced that Lindsey Troy of Deap Vally had joined as a touring bass-player.

The band's fourth album, Paradise, was released on 6 May 2016. In contrast to previous records, the album had "more story-centric songs while Barber-Way find that live the older songs "have taken on a new meaning when I'm onstage. I conjure up a new kind of anger".

The band announced in September 2022 they will be breaking up following the release of their fifth and final album, Premonition, in December 2022.

== Band members ==
Former members

- Mish Barber-Way – vocals (2006–2022)
- Anne-Marie Vassiliou – drums (2006–2022)
- Kenneth William – guitars (2009–2022)
- Natasha Reich – guitars (2006–2008)
- Grady Mackintosh – bass (2006–2013)

Former touring members

- Caroline Doyle – bass (2016–2021)
- Hether Fortune – bass (2013–2015)
- Lindsey Troy – bass (2015–2017)

Timeline

== Discography ==
=== Studio albums ===
- It's the Evil (2010)
- Sorry (2012)
- Deep Fantasy (2014)
- Paradise (2016)
- Premonition (2022)

=== Singles ===
"Local Garbage" (HDR 18)

- Released: September 2007
- Format: 7" Vinyl 45 RPM
- Label: Hockey Dad Records
- Tracks: "Local Garbage", "Breaking Boxes", "Amy White Out"

"Magazines" (DY 131)

- Released: 18 May 2008
- Format: 7" Vinyl 45 RPM/DD
- Label: Deranged
- Tracks: "Magazines", "Therapy", "Backhouse"

"Atlanta" (DY 163) from the album It's the Evil

- Released: 21 May 2010
- Format: 7" Vinyl 45 RPM/DD
- Label: Deranged
- Tracks: "Atlanta", "D.O.I.", "80,000 Times"

S/T

- Released: 6 September 2012
- Format: 7" Vinyl 45 RPM/DD
- Label: Sabotage Records
- Tracks: "Two of You", "Hunting Holiday"

Songs About The South

- Released: 6 September 2013
- Format: 7" Vinyl 45 RPM/DD
- Label: Deranged Records
- Tracks: "Blow it South", "Down With You"

"Drown With the Monster" from the album Deep Fantasy

- Released: 28 April 2014
- Format: 7" Vinyl 45 RPM/DD
- Label: Domino Records
- Tracks: "Drown With the Monster", "Snake Jaw"

=== Various artists compilations ===
"Therapy" (GROSSMOD07 / NOMI002) from the album The Emergency Room Vol. 1

- Released: 24 June 2008
- Format: LP/DD
- Label: Grotesque, Modern/Nominal
- Tracks: "Therapy"

=== Music videos ===
Year	Song	Director(s)
2010	"Loose Heels"	Ryan Anderson
2010	"Atlanta"	Ryan Anderson
2010	"Sleep Creep"	Kenneth William
2012	"Take the Mirror"	Kenneth William
2012	"Bag"	Liam Mitchell
2012	"Glue"	Pierce McGary
2012	"Deadbeat"	Kenneth William
2014	"Drown With the Monster"	Steven Andrew Garcia
2014	"Face Down"	Pierce McGary
2016	"Hungry"	Justin Gradin
2016	"Below"	Richard Bates, Jr.
2016	"Dead Weight"	John Stavas
2016	"Sister"	Justin Gradin
2022	"Date Night"	Justin Gradin
2022	"Tomorrow"	Justin Gradin
2022	"Bird"	Kenneth William
