= Tenement (band) =

American rock band

- Origin: Appleton, Wisconsin, United States
- Genres: Punk rock; pop punk; noise pop
- Years active: 2006–present
- Labels: Don Giovanni; Mandible; Cowabunga
- Members: Amos Pitsch; Jesse Ponkamo; Eric Mayer
- Past members: Max Suechting; Hart Miller; Tyler Ditter; Troy Hackbarth

Tenement is an American three piece rock band from Appleton, Wisconsin, United States, formed in 2006. They are often associated with the American hardcore punk scene. Their recorded output has been described as everything from "noise pop" to "fuzz punk", while in a live setting, they are often known for experimentation, improvisation, and high-energy performance. The visual art of singer/guitarist Amos Pitsch is associated with most of their records, as well as several records by other notable punk and hardcore bands. In January 2013, NME included Tenement in their "rising stars of 2013". CMJ called Tenement a "breakout artist to watch" in 2014. In 2015, Tenement was included in Spin 's "The 50 Best Rock Bands Right Now". In 2016, they were included in Rolling Stone 's "10 Great Modern Punk Bands".

Tenement and their relation to contemporary punk, hardcore, and DIY was the subject of The New York Times ' June 2015 Popcast; which was hosted by author Ben Ratliff and featured special guests Maria Sherman and Liz Pelly. In reference to Tenement and the DIY scene in which they operate out of, Pelly noted, "It's pretty clear that for these musicians punk is more something they relate to on an ideological level."

In 2016, Tenement was invited to play Eaux Claires, an outdoor music festival curated by Justin Vernon of Bon Iver and Aaron Dessner of The National. "A Frightening Place For Normal People," from their 2015 double album Predatory Headlights, was included on the festival's teaser mixtape as a remix called "A Frightening Place For Normal People And Farmers" and credited to Tenement and radio host Jack Raymond. Rock Of The Arts said of their festival appearance, "(...) Pitsch and Tenement really exhibit the independent qualities that Eaux Claires holds so dearly. An underground basement band from Appleton, Wisconsin, that continues to proudly fly the DIY flag, never forgetting where they came from no matter how much attention they receive." Speaking on the eclectic nature of the festival's lineup, Justin Vernon told Billboard: "For me it's so interesting, and it's part of the uniqueness of our situation at Eaux Claires, that Erykah Badu and Tenement -- there might be an equal amount of fans for Erykah Badu and Tenement at this thing. And while Erykah is an extremely important part of the landscape of this year, everything plays into that. For me it's just interesting to watch those worlds interact and also coexist simultaneously."

Actor and comedian Chris Gethard curated a playlist for Brooklyn, New York club Shea Stadium in 2016, compiling his favorite performances at the venue. He included Tenement's 2013 performance of "Spit In The Wind" with the note, "Simply put, they don't make 'em better than Tenement. My wife is significantly cooler than I am and was the one who made it clear to me that Tenement would be one of my favorite bands, and she was totally correct."

== Style and reputation ==
For most of their formative years, members of Tenement lived in and operated the BFG punk house in Appleton, Wisconsin- which hosted hundreds of bands over the course of eight years and served as a recording space for portions of each of their studio albums from 2011 to 2015. Their connection to the house and the relationships they developed with national touring artists that played there cemented their reputation as disciples of DIY culture. Despite national acclaim, the house (and the band) remained an underground fixture within the confines of the city of Appleton. Pitsch told The Post-Crescent in 2015, "We've been an enigma to people and in our own little world". The same year, he told Ghettoblaster Magazine, "In a town like Appleton, Wisconsin, a place like BFG was a lawless jungle. I’d always thought that it was meant to be bulldozed and not to be handed over to new tenants. The energy that place held after we’d been there for eight years wasn’t meant to linger in a normal family environment." For many, setting foot in The BFG was an experience that brought them to a closer understanding of what drove Tenement as a group and how they fit- personally and creatively- into the greater scheme of music and art in America. Some saw them as off-the-grid, insular, outlying personas, and others saw them as music savants, students of their record collections, and eccentrics with nearly singular-interest personalities. RVA Mag visited the house in 2010 and wrote: "[Amos'] room, located on the top floor of the BFG House, Appleton’s main house show venue, is indicative of his lifestyle. Some recording equipment is set up on a desk, with a computer that doesn’t connect to the internet. There are several tape players and a record player connected to a stereo, and the only other real furniture in the room are some shelves which provide haven for Pitsch’s vast record collection. When I enter the room, he’s listening to the Four Tops. He doesn’t have a bed, but there are some sleeping mats folded in the corner." Heartbreaking Bravery 's Steven Spoerl commented in 2015 on how the environment of The BFG hinted at Tenement's eclectic taste in music and how it came to define them as a band: "It was impossible to spend thirty seconds flipping through any one of the thousands of [records] that littered that house and not jump from 80’s hardcore to free jazz session recordings to sludge to the golden era of soul, all of which would be directly underneath an unending murderer’s row of killer flyers for (increasingly strong) bills that the house hosted. It evoked the ideal of the American melting pot more than just a little and, in a way, furthered the band’s identity." As of 2015, The BFG was condemned and demolished.

Bassist Jesse Ponkamo commented on Tenement's commitment to stubborn individualism and self-preservation in a 2015 interview with Tone Madison, stating: "I’ve kind of come to feel like Tenement is sort of an extension of all of our creativity, all the facets of our creativity. It’s the embodiment of us wanting to be creative people and actualizing our creativity, in a way. For instance, the photos and the art that are on a lot of our records, we do that ourselves, and Amos does all of the collage work. It all just is an expression of us. Images have sounds too, and I feel like there are certain images that I’m sure all three of us may want to evoke when we’re playing or making sounds together."

As a live unit, Tenement have been both lauded and criticized for their high-volume, high-intensity, and often-brief performances. In her Down is Up column for Pitchfork, Jenn Pelly wrote of a 2014 performance at Brooklyn, New York's Death By Audio that Tenement made the venue feel like a "lawless, off-the-grid basement" and adding, "During an intensely peculiar interlude, Tenement frontman Amos Pitsch rang church bells until they began to fall apart; later, the crowd demanded an encore." On a string of sold-out shows with soul singer Charles Bradley in 2016, Tenement was confronted with split audiences engaging in both booing and cheering. Not to be outdone, the band decided to turn up the volume. Amos Pitsch remarked in an interview with Vice, "You could say that at some of the shows we were louder than ever. Even almost too loud for myself on stage." In a live review for La Crosse Tribune in 2017, Randy Erickson sympathized with Tenement's short set lengths, calling each song an "energy-sapping eruption". He described the band lunging into action "in unison without any apparent sign between the trio to trigger it. It was like a fuse was lit, and they exploded into each song, with Pitsch moving with the lethal confidence of a bullfighter," and elaborated, "The soundman at the Cavalier said he didn't even run the guitar amps through the sound board because they were loud enough to fill the theater on their own. And I was standing right in front of the stage."

In August 2012, Jonathan Garrett from NME attended a house show in St. Paul, Minnesota and wrote, "On the first night of their absurdly long tour, Tenement don't seem the least bit fazed- by the lack of a stage, the terrible acoustics, or the swarming crowd. By way of introduction, frontman Amos Pitsch simply drops his already busted glasses onto the top of the amplifier, plugs in, and unleashes a hissing peal of feedback. The crowd lunges forward, and then, as if on command, pulls back to reveal the trio in full. (...) By the time they reach the climactic midpoint, the entire basement is pure chaos, a ricocheting mass of limbs, some occasionally clipping the exposed air ducts overhead. Four songs and roughly ten minutes later, it's all over. The crowd, still whipped into a frenzy, implore Tenement for an encore and Pitsch doesn't miss a beat: 'No. Go fuck yourselves.'" Garrett went on to differentiate between Tenement's recorded work and the live experience, saying everything is played "faster, looser, and louder".

In a live review for PopMatters of a performance at Manhattan's Bowery Ballroom, Corey Beasley described Tenement as "nothing more than a few dudes with serious chops going through the noise-pop motions", later admitting, "there were highs: when Pitsch finished the set with a smoldering, screeching guitar solo, the improvisation brought a life to his band’s set unseen in its workmanlike beginnings." The review goes on to complain of the crowd's "routinized punk behavior" such as "pogoing" and "shoving".

CLRVYNT reviewed Tenement's 2016 performance at the New Alternative Music Festival in Asbury Park, New Jersey- punctuating their penchant for "making weird every performance they're allowed to make weird".

== Discography ==
=== Studio albums ===
- Napalm Dream (2011, Mandible Records)
- The Blind Wink (2011, Cowabunga Records)
- Predatory Headlights (2015, Don Giovanni Records)
- The Self-Titled Album (2016, Deranged Records, Forward Records)
- Music Composed for the Motion Picture PROXY (2017, Malokul Records)
- Music Composed for the Motion Picture 'Smother Me in Hugs' (2018, Malokul Records)

=== Collection albums ===
- Bruised Music, Volume 1 (2015, Grave Mistake Records, Toxic Pop Records)
- Bruised Music, Volume 2 (2016, Grave Mistake Records, Toxic Pop Records)

=== EPs and singles ===
- Daytrotter Session (2016, Daytrotter)
- No Friends Flexi No. 4 Split Record w/ Dyke Drama, Endless Column, Jamie and the Debt (2016, No Friends Magazine)
- Split Record w/ Screaming Females (2013, Recess Records)
- Sick Club Series Volume 3 (2013, Cowabunga Records)
- Split Record w/ Cheeky (2012, Let's Pretend Records, No Breaks Records)
- Split Record w/ Culo (2011, Cowabunga Records)
- Taking Everything b/w Daylight World (2011, Toxic Pop Records)
- False Teeth EP (2010, Rock Bottom Records)
- Split Record w/ Friendly Fire (2009, Forcefield Records)
- Split Record w/ Used Kids (2009, 608 Kisses Records)
- Icepick b/w Summer Street (2009, 608 Kisses Records)

=== Compilation appearances ===
- Year Of The Monkey Rooster (2018, Dead Broke Rekerds)
- Local Hits Compilation (2016, Don Giovanni Records)
- Deux Mixtape (2016, Eaux Claires)
- MKE Artists and Friends 2016 (2016, Goodland Records)
- Bughouse Volume One Mixtape (2015, Not Normal Tapes)
- 2015 Farm/Art Dtour Soundtrack (2015, Fermentation Fest)
- Level Up Compilation (2015, CJSW-FM)
- Parasongs: A Parasites Tribute (2015, Kid Tested Records)
- Skeletal Lightning Charity Cassette Compilation Volume One (2014, Skeletal Lightning Records)
- Summer Of Clatter Mixtape (2014, Acid Kat Records)
- Drawn A Blank Mixtape (2013, No Breaks Records)
- Something To Du: A Tribute to Hüsker Dü 7" Compilation (2013, Dead Broke Rekerds/Drunken Sailor Records)
- Puke and Destroy No. 2 7" Compilation (2013, Snuffy Smile)
- Welcome to 2013 12" Compilation (2013, Not Normal Records)
- The Wiener Dog Comp Cassette Compilation (2012, Burger Records)
- Dead Broke Tape Comp Volume 3 (2009, Dead Broke Rekerds)
- Dirt Cult Mix Tape Volume II (2009, Dirt Cult Records)
- Now That's What I Call Dip (2009, No Label)
