= The Mormons (band) =

- Origin: Los Angeles, California, USA
- Genres: Punk rock
- Years active: 1998–present
- Labels: Nickel & Dime Records
- Members: Patrick Jones; Vince O'campo; Johnny Ramirez; Pete Tintle; Tim Neumann
- Past members: Jimmy Castillo; Tucker Robinson; Dan Buccat; Louie Rodriguez; Ryan Weik; Mike Lopez; Johnny Mesa
- Website: Official website

The Mormons are an American punk rock band formed in 1998 in Los Angeles. The band's influences include Devo, Minor Threat, Screeching Weasel, Bad Brains and Talking Heads. Although no band members are members of the LDS Church, they wear outfits inspired by Mormon missionaries: bicycle helmets, backpacks, stud belts, Dickies, scatterings of facial hair and thrift store ties.

The Mormons have been featured in The Salt Lake Tribune and L.A. Alternative. They have received a write-up in BYU NewsNet.

The current band lineup consists of Patrick Jones (vocals), Vince O'Campo (guitar, vocals), Pete Tintle (guitar), Johnny Ramirez (Bass), and Tim Neumann (Drums).

== Band members ==
=== Current line-up ===
- Patrick Jones- vocals (1998–present)
- Vince O'Campo - guitar, bass (1998–present)
- Johnny Ramirez - bass (2022–present)
- Pete Tintle - rhythm guitar (2008, 2013–present)
- Tim Neumann - drums (2022–present)

=== Past members ===
- Jimmy Castillo - Bass, Guitar (2001-2010 2012-2020)
- Tucker Robinson - Drums, Guitar (2013-2022)
- Louie Rodriguez - rhythm guitar (1999-2007)
- Johnny Mesa - drums (2003-2007)
- Drew Gale - bass (1999-2000)
- Dan Buccat - drums, guitar (2007-2013)
- Kelly Kusumoto - drums (2007-2010)
- Ryan Weik - Drums, Guitar (1998-2003)

== Discography ==
=== Albums ===
- Statement of No Statement (2004, Nickel & Dime Records)
- ’’Rock Out Correctly’’ (2016, Self Released)

=== EPs ===
- Forge Ahead EP (2010, MorMusic)
