= Kenneth Higney =

American outsider musician

Kenneth Higney is a rock musician. His first album, Attic Demonstration, became popular for record collectors and was recorded in 1976 due to selling other musicians his songwriting services. It was released as a commercial prospect.

== Attic Demonstration ==
Attic Demonstration featured Higney on vocals and electric and acoustic guitars, with an ad hoc band consisting of Higney's personal friends Gordon Gaines (guitars, drums), John Duva (bass guitar), and Mark Volpe (guitar, percussion). It had a limited release of 500 copies in September 1976, despite 1000 copies being made. It had not been intended to be an actual album, but became popular because of its uniqueness and song view. It had earned a favourable review in Trouser Press magazine, but was not a commercial success. Nonetheless, it became a cult item amongst record collectors over subsequent years. It was re-mastered and re-released on CD by Higney's own label, Kebrutney Records, in 2003 and on vinyl by One Kind Favor in 2012.

The remaster also included Higney's 1980 7-inch single “I Wanna Be The King”, b/w “Funky Kinky”. The former song was a tribute to New York Dolls guitarist and punk legend Johnny Thunders, and contained the line “I’m gonna be a star / I hate the sissy music of John Denver”, whilst the latter was a foray into the world of disco. Both songs were written by Higney, and featured Gordon Gaines and Mark Volpe, plus John Lynch (bass guitar). Gaines died in 1997.

=== Track listing ===
1. Night Rider
2. Children of Sound
3. Rock Star
4. Can't Love That Woman
5. Look at the River
6. Quietly Leave Me
7. Let Us Pray
8. I'll Cry Tomorrow
9. No Heavy Trucking
10. Funky Kinky *CD only bonus track
11. I Wanna Be the King *CD only bonus track

== American Dirt ==
In 2009, Higney released the 'follow-up' (30 years later) to Attic Demonstration - it is titled American Dirt and contains fourteen songs, many of which were written about the same time as those on Attic Demonstration. As this album was recorded with the intention of being released as an actual recording (as opposed to Attic Demonstration which was originally conceived as demo versions of songs), Higney enlisted the help of hired guns - Jack Pearson (formerly of The Allman Brothers Band), Elizabeth Pearson, William Howse, Richard Carter and others - to produce a more professional recording. American Dirt was described by one radio DJ as if a record label had heard Attic Demonstration and given Higney money to record a 'proper album'.

== Ambulance Driver ==
2011 saw the release of Higney's third album - Ambulance Driver - which contained ten new recordings with one song, “Nonsense”, coming from the days of Attic Demonstration and the remaining nine songs being, pretty much, newly written. This release contains Higney's most recently written songs, among them “Angels Touched The Ground”, “Jet Party” and, the newest of them all, “Broken By a Whore”.

Higney continues to write and record and is expected to release a new album sometime this decade.
