= Terminal A =

American synth punk duo

Terminal A is an American synth punk musical duo based in San Pedro, California that formed in 2012.

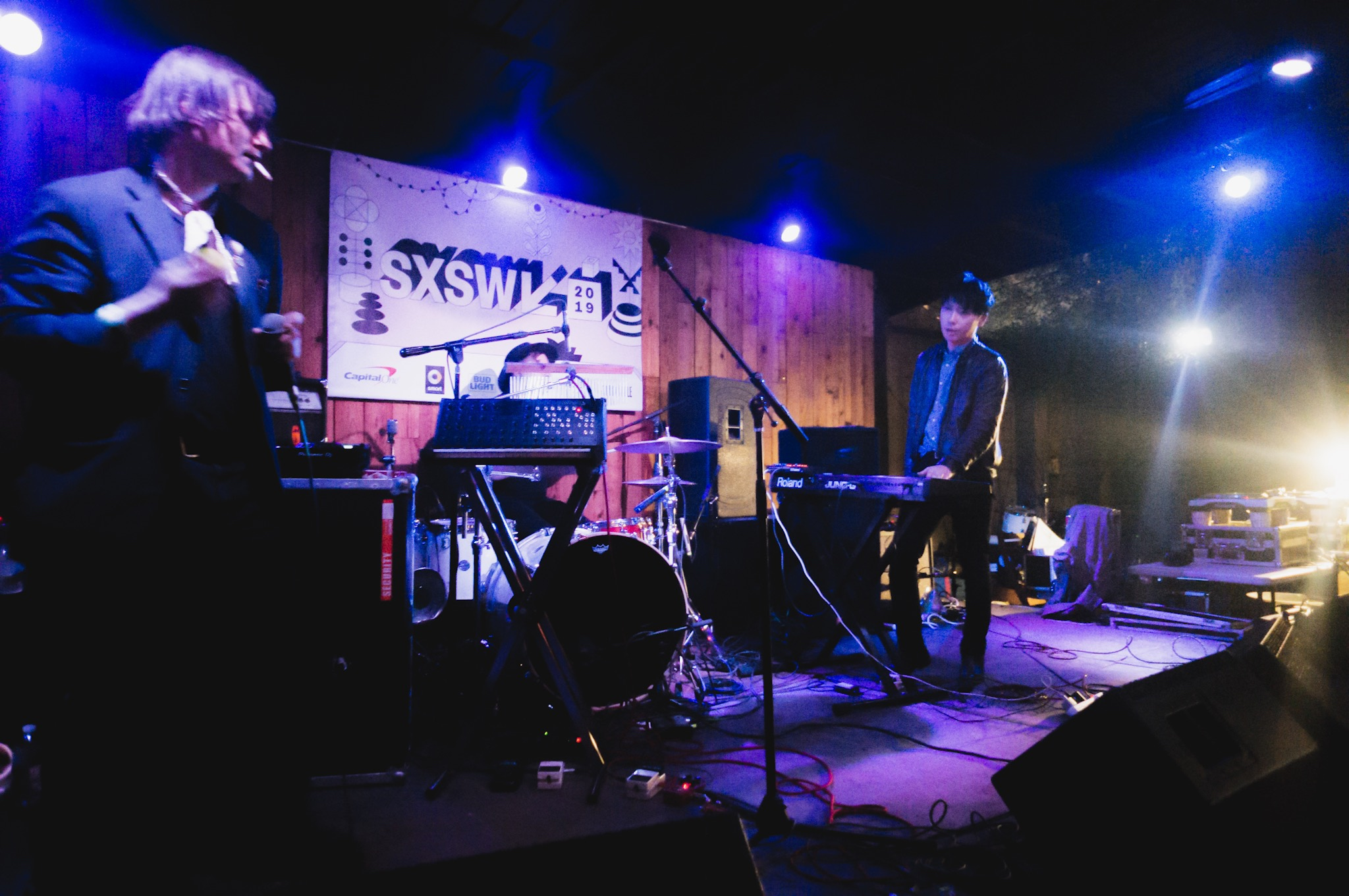

They have toured nationally, including performances at SXSW and Tulsa Overground Festival and have opened for Sleaford Mods, Chrome, Modern English, and Adult.

Their debut EP, entitled Pacific Water & Power, was released in 2014 on Records Ad Nauseam. In 2015 they released a four-way split on Resurrection Records, and a collaboration with poet/performance artist Sheree Rose. The band has been the subject of features in publications such as Flaunt Magazine and The Fader, as well as being listed by LA Weekly as one of the top 15 bands of 2015.

The Fader has described their sound as "minimal electronic beats with gritty guitar riffs and bellowing vocals. The result is a style that lands somewhere between anarcho-punks Flux of Pink Indians and avant-dance legends Kraftwerk."
