= Predatory Headlights =

Studio album by Tenement
- Released: June 2, 2015
- Recorded: 2012–2014
- Genres: Punk rock, pop, pop-punk
- Length: 78:00
- Label: Don Giovanni
- Producers: Amos Pitsch, Justin Perkins

Tenement chronology
Bruised Music, Volume 1 (2015)	Predatory Headlights (2015)

Predatory Headlights is a double album by Appleton, Wisconsin-based rock group Tenement. It was released in June 2015 by New York-based record label Don Giovanni Records. Perhaps due to its length and frequent genre cross-over, it was initially ignored by many established music publications but eventually ended up on Rolling Stone's "15 Great Albums You Didn't Hear In 2015" list and Spin magazine's "2015 Overlooked Albums Report". According to The New Yorker, the album "Highlights the strongest aspects of the group's songwriting". It was ranked No. 100 by The Village Voice on their 2015 Pazz & Jop critics poll.

The album's lyrical themes were largely influenced by Amos Pitsch's observations, musings, and experiences as he traversed America in the summer of 2012, playing drums for a reunion tour of 1970s power pop group the Nerves. The song lyrics and accompanying album art draw on prominent motifs of Americana in an effort to reflect the darker aspects of America and its political and social climates.

Iggy Pop played three songs from Predatory Headlights on the March 4th, 2016 episode of his BBC radio show and proclaimed, "Hats off Tenement, You got big balls."

An 8th grade English class in Nablus, Palestine were tasked with the assignment to individually review Predatory Headlights in the spring of 2016. The reviews were sent to Amos Pitsch with a warning from their teacher, Mr. Alex: "The kids who wrote the reviews are really great kids, but have some very strange musical taste, most listen to Palestinian Dubkeh, or Egyptian and Lebanese Pop, so your music was a bit strange and foreign to some of them.” Many of the children focused on "creepy" and "nightmare" elements of the music and spoke of concrete ideas that abstract or instrumental passages in the songs made them think of, such as the sounds of bells representing a "ghost city" and the buzzing string sections in "Hive of Hives" sounding like the buzzing of bees. Pitsch commented to 88Nine Radio Milwaukee that it was interesting to observe how the children picked up on deeper themes in the music and how dynamics in the music emotionally affect the listener, while many professional music critics utilize reviews to home in on what other groups or musicians they can compare a record to.

In August 2018, Tenement released the Mark Borchardt-directed music video for "Garden Of Secrecy", which was filmed over the course of three years in the countrysides of Appleton, Madison, and Milwaukee, Wisconsin. In an essay for Talkhouse, Borchardt stated that the basic concept for the video was to "capture the Wisconsin landscape" and elaborated, " Wisconsin has always been a silent influence on my work. Wherever you’re born in the world, that’s what you’re familiar with; that’s what you work with, and that’s what inspires you. To say that this, that, or the other thing is because of Wisconsin… It’s like, look man, there’s a whole world out there. There are thousands of cities and everyone believes that their special place is unique. In shooting in this part of Wisconsin, I don’t have to create a fantasy—it’s the area I’m familiar with. It’s a place I dearly love".

In Episode 4, Season 2 of Netflix series 13 Reasons Why, a poster depicting the cover artwork for Predatory Headlights is seen hanging on protagonist Clay Jensen 's bedroom wall. Speaking to Screen Rant, production designer Diane Lederman explained, " Brian Yorkey has a lot to do with Clay’s bedroom; that was a very personal journey for him. We worked closely with Dylan Minnette to choose all of the music posters on his walls. It had to feel right for the character."

Upon release of Predatory Headlights, Tenement toured the United States several times both on their own and with peers such as Indiana hardcore punk band Big Zit, soul singer Charles Bradley, Philadelphia rock group Sheer Mag, Direct Hit!, Dusk, Florida's Golden Pelicans, and Black Thumb. They also spent time on the road in Canada, Scandinavia, and Mexico. Mexican metal magazine Clinic Diafragma wrote of their show in Mexico City: "Last night we slipped into one of the most extravagant punk sanctuaries in Mexico City to experience the Tenement experience. Acclaimed by Iggy Pop and many other global rock stars. [...] A guy I met at the entrance to the forum was so excited to see this band. For him and many others present, it was really a dream come true. The emotional moment of seeing Tenement live was all a multi-dimensional experience [...] Unfortunately, not everything was healthy fun, as a public loquillo headed for Amos and verbally assaulted him while the group was in action. The frontman was annoyed, kicked away that leech, and even if you do not believe it, they stopped playing abruptly and disconnected all their equipment."

== Reception ==
Professional ratings
Review scores
Source	Rating
AllMusic	3.5/5 stars
Pitchfork	7.1/10 stars
Punknews	4/5 stars
Spin	8/10 stars
Sputnikmusic	3.7/5

The New York Times: "Mr. Pitsch will write half of a song that could have been a modern-rock radio hit 20 years ago, then break through the three-minute barrier and move the ABA form toward C, D, and E sections, minimalism, drones and process music. About a third of the album uses a compositional palette of strings, out-of-tune pianos, household percussion instruments and outdoor recordings. None of it is haphazard; every song is a puzzle, an attempt to connect varied impulses, shaped with a beginning and an end."

AllMusic: "With some judicious trimming, Predatory Headlights could have been a creative breakthrough and a great listen from front to back; as it is, this is a good album whose occasional nosedives into pretentiousness keep it from being great, though despite its flaws, it's well worth a listen and confirms Tenement are a band with remarkable promise."

Punknews: " A strange dichotomy is achieved on this album between that which is melodic and poppy, and that which is dark and atmospheric. It is jarring, and for the most part it works to lend Tenement a certain depth of artistry that many contemporaries are unable to bring to the table. It ultimately serves to make Tenement a more interesting, complex musical entity."

Shortly after release, The Washington Post ranked Predatory Headlights No. 1 on their Month's Best Music list, stating "Here's a rock album that's instantly pleasurable, but demands commitment." Sahan Jayasuria stated in Milwaukee Magazine that he believed Predatory Headlights to be "the most impressive album to come out of Wisconsin in the last decade". In a 2015 profile piece on Tenement for ESPN's Grantland, Steven Hyden maintained that perhaps Big Star's Third was a more fitting influence for Predatory Headlights than The New York Times' comparisons to The Rolling Stones' Exile On Main Street, Husker Du's Zen Arcade, and The Minutemen's Double Nickels On The Dime. Predatory Headlights was mentioned in an August 2015 piece on NPR entitled, "Does Anybody Even Have Time For An 80-minute Album?". Pitchfork proved indecisive in its assessment of Predatory Headlights; ranking it favorably but waxing critically about its length and focus while adding, "Depending on whether you think of 'punk rock' as a sonic descriptor or a philosophy, records like Predatory Headlights are either the least or most punk-rock move possible."

In Cretins Of Distortion 's multi-page review of Predatory Headlights, Tenement is painted as a band which defies the prioritization of commercial appeal in pop music in favor of free expression. They note that "it's a record that from the second you peel back the shrink wrap, confusion begins" and claim that "Tenement's most admirable feat is not accepting a crowd's taste as their sound; not writing songs to propel their career as musicians".

Predatory Headlights found its way onto many 2015 best-of lists, including but not limited to: The A.V. Club 's "Best Music Of 2015", New York Magazine 's "The 10 Best Albums Of 2015", The Newspaper 's "Albums Of the Year 2015", The New York Times ' "The Best Albums Of 2015", Noise rock group Perfect Pussy 's "Albums Of The Year" for The Village Voice with the note, "The whole album is so powerful. The record is so powerful that it creates its own vibe. Which is kinda a hard thing to do in modern day music, especially when you're three white guys living in Wisconsin. It's incredible.", Slate 's "Top Ten Albums", Wisconsin Public Radio 's "The Best Wisconsin Music Of 2015", Milwaukee Magazine 's "Top 15 of 2015: The Best Albums Of The Year", Impose 's "The Best Albums Of 2015", FREEwilliamsburg 's "Top 25 Albums Of 2015", Now 's "Top Albums Of 2015" and Affinity Magazine 's "13 Sweet Albums of Summer '15".

In August 2022, Creem called Predatory Headlights "nothing short of one of the most unsung records of the 2010s"

== Track listing ==
All compositions by Amos Pitsch.

1. "Theme of the Cuckoo"
2. "Crop Circle Nation"
3. "Dull Joy"
4. "Feral Cat Tribe"
5. "The Shriveled Finger"
6. "Harvest Time (Has Come)"
7. "Under the Storm Clouds"
8. "Ants & Flies"
9. "Garden of Secrecy"
10. "The Butcher"
11. "Whispering Kids"
12. "Curtains Closed"
13. "Why Are We Where We Are"
14. "You Keep Me Cool"
15. "Cold the Pavement Is"
16. "Heavy Odor"
17. "A Frightening Place for Normal People"
18. "Licking a Wound"
19. "I'm Your Super Glue"
20. "Hive of Hives"
21. "The Dishwasher's Meal"
22. "Keep Your Mouth Shut"
23. "Foreign Phrase"
24. "Near You"
25. "Afraid of the Unknown"
