= Career Suicide (band) =

Canadian hardcore punk band

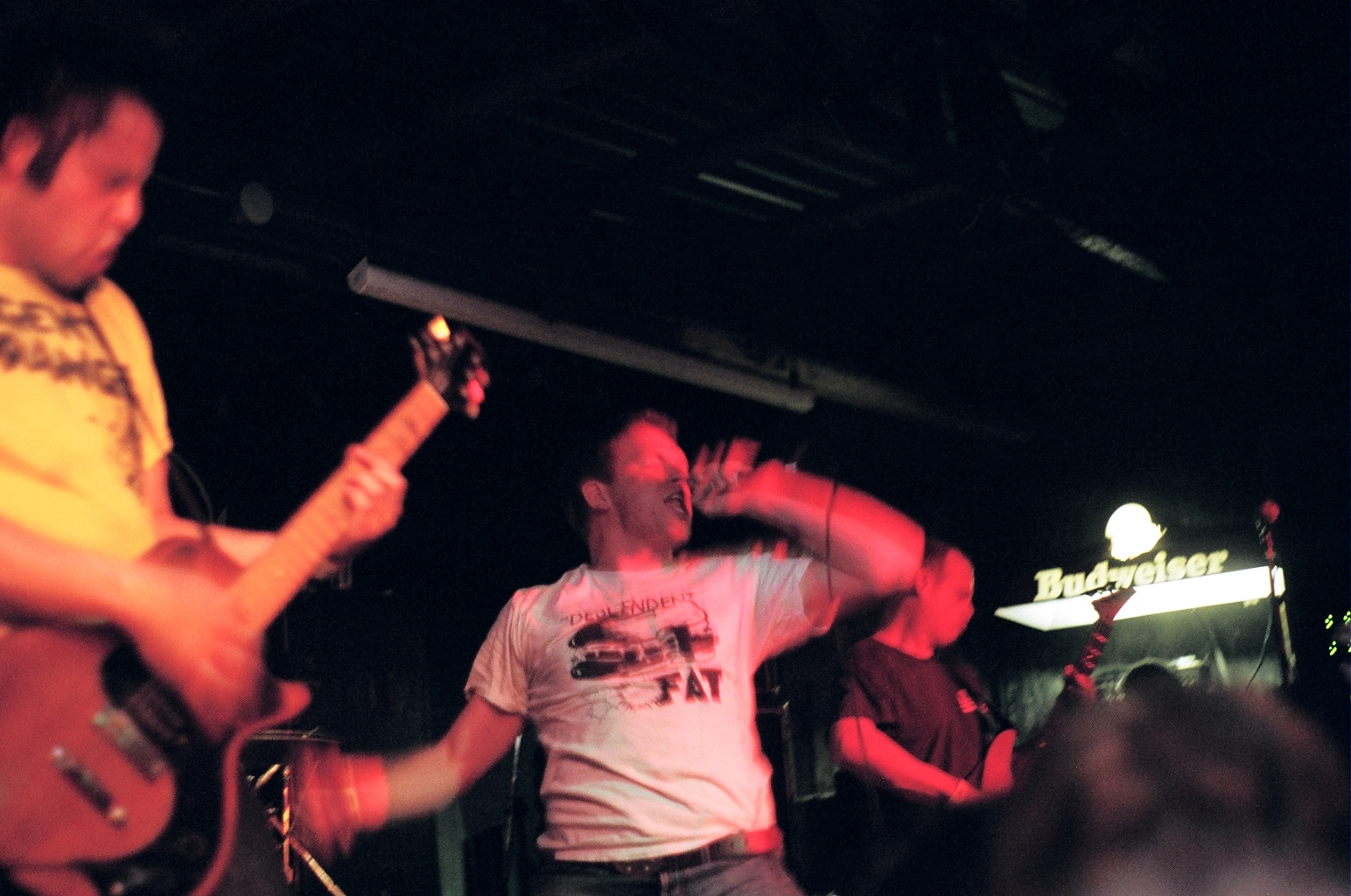
- live at 6th Street in Austin, Texas

Background information
- Also known as: Punitive Damage's
- Origin: Toronto, Ontario
- Genres: Hardcore punk
- Years active: 2001–present
- Labels: Sewercide, Deranged, Feral Ward, Even Worse, Ugly Pop
- Members: Jonah Falco; Jon Sharron; Dallas Good; Martin Farkas
- Past members: Eric Smith; Noah Gadke; Jesse Parker; Bennett Jones-Phillips; Chis Colohan; Mike Haliechuk; Mark Hurst; Matt Hammmond; Polish Neal; Mark Rodenheizer; Brandon Ferrell; Matthew Miller; Dave Brown
- Website: careersuicide.net

Career Suicide is a Canadian hardcore punk band formed in 2001 in Toronto. The band's first live performance took place in January 2002, with first recorded output soon to follow. The band has gone on to record several full-length albums and singles on various international labels. The band has completed multiple tours of North America, Europe and Japan and continues to record and tour actively. Guitarist Jonah Falco and former bassist Mike Haliechuk also play drums and guitar, respectively, in the band Fucked Up. Career Suicide are known for having an authentic 1980s hardcore sound.

== Discography ==
=== Albums, EPs/Singles and Tapes ===
- 1st demo tape (2002, self-released)
- 2nd demo tape (2002, self-released)
- Career Suicide 7-inch EP (2002, Kangaroo Records)
- Career Suicide LP (2002, Ugly Pop Records)
- SARS 7-inch EP (2003, Deranged Records)
- Invisible Eyes 12-inch EP (2005, Feral Ward Records)
- Signals 7-inch EP (2004, Slasher Records)
- Signals 7-inch EP (European picture disk) (2004, Even Worse Records)
- Split LP w/ Jed Whitey (2004, Deranged Records)
- Attempted Suicide LP & CD (2006/2007, Deranged Records)
- Cherry Beach 7-inch EP (UK tour edition) (2008, Sewercide Records)
- Cherry Beach 7-inch EP (2010, Dirtnap Records)
- Machine Response 12-inch LP (2017, Static Shock Records)

=== Anthologies ===
- Anthology of Releases, 2001–2003 CD (2004, Kangaroo Records / Deranged Records)
- Anthology of Releases Vol. 2, 2003–2005 CD (2006, Deranged Records)

== Members ==
=== Current members ===
- Jonah Falco – guitar
- Martin Farkas – vocals
- Jon Sharron – bass
- Ian Romano – drums

=== Past members ===
- Eric Smith – drums
- Noah Gadke – bass
- Jesse Parker – drums
- Bennett Jones-Phillips – bass
- Chris Colohan – drums
- Mike Haliechuk – bass
- Mark Hurst – drums
- Neal (of Poland) – bass
- Mark Rodenheizer – bass
- Brandon Ferrell – drums (on Attempted Suicide LP) and 2nd guitar (live)
- David Brown - drums
- Matthew Miller - bass
- Matthew Hammond - guitar
- Dallas Good - guitar
