= Deranged Records =

Canadian punk record label

- Founded: 1999
- Founder: Gordon Dufresne
- Genre: Hardcore punk
- Country of origin: Canada
- Location: Roberts Creek, British Columbia
- Official website: www.derangedrecords.com

Deranged Records is a Canadian punk record label based in Roberts Creek, British Columbia. It was founded in 1999 by Gordon Dufresne. Notable bands who have had releases with the label are Fucked Up, Career Suicide and Brutal Knights. The label is known for releasing hardcore punk; however, more recently they have been releasing albums that are more pop punk.

== Discography ==
- 86 Mentality - Final Exit 7-inch
- Agna Moraine's Autobiography - 7-inch
- Anomie - Mrta Benefit LP
- The Bayonettes - Stuck in this Rut 7-inch
- The Bayonettes - We're Doomed EP
- Born Dead Icons - Part Of Something... 7-inch
- Brain Killer - Demo 7-inch
- Brain Killer - s/t 7-inch
- Brain Killer - Every Actual State is Corrupt LP
- Brutal Knights - Not Fun EP
- Brutal Knights - Living by Yourself
- Career Suicide - 2001 to 2003 CD
- Career Suicide - Sars 7-inch
- Career Suicide/Jed Whitey - split 12-inch
- Casanovas In Heat - Ruins 7-inch
- Countdown to Oblivion - Brain Surgery... 7-inch
- Crude - Immortality LP/CD
- Dead Stop - Done With You LP / CD
- Demon System 13 - For The Kids... 7-inch
- Demon System 13 - No One Will Thank You... CD
- Demon System 13 - Vad Vet Vi om Kriget? CD/LP
- Dumbstruck - If It Ain't Broke... 7-inch
- Drift/Jonah - split 7-inch
- D.S.B. - No Fight No Get 7-inch
- E.T.A. - No Faith LP/CD
- E.T.A. - We Are The Attack 7-inch
- Exclaim - Keep Things Evolving Positively 7-inch
- Flowers of Evil - Self Titled LP
- Fucked Up - Baiting The Public 7-inch
- Fucked Up - Dance of Death 7-inch
- Fucked Up - Epics In Minutes CD
- Fucked Up - No Pasaran 7-inch
- Fucked Up- Police 7-inch
- Fucked Up - Hidden World
- Hacksaw - Turned Up Turned Down CD/LP
- Hammer - できるもんならやってみな LP
- Hammer- Raw Tracks 2000 7-inch
- Haymaker - Fuck America 7-inch
- Haymaker - Love The Music, Hate The Kids 7-inch
- Haymaker - It Only Gets Worse LP/CD
- Haymaker - Lost Tribe 7-inch
- Highscore- New Fuel LP
- Holier than Thou? - High On Barbecue LP
- Holier than Thou? - Riviera Sessions CD
- Intensity - The Ruins of Our Future LP
- Jonah - 7-inch
- Last in Line - Crosswalk 7-inch
- Leatherface - Discography Part 2: Rare & Unreleased LP
- Look Back and Laugh - Street Terrorism - 7-inch
- Male Nurses - s/t 7-inch
- Minnow - 7-inch
- Neo Cons - S/T 7-inch
- Neo Cons - Idiot Circus 7-inch
- NK 6 - Keep On Keeping On LP/CD
- No Class - S/T 12-inch LP
- Nomos - Demo 7-inch
- Nomos- Notes From The Acheron 12-inch
- The Observers - Lead Pill 7-inch
- Our War - If You're Not Now... CD/10"
- Out Cold - Will Attack If Provoked LP
- Out Cold/Voorhees - split LP
- Rammer - 7-inch
- Red Dons - Escaping Amman 7-inch
- Siege - Drop Dead
- Smalltown - The Music LP/CD
- Smalltown - Years, Months 7-inch
- Smalltown - The First Three Years CD
- The Stakeout - On The Run LP/CD
- Statues - Same Bodies, Same Faces 7-inch
- Tear it Up - Just Can't Stand It LP
- Tear it Up- The First Four Months CD
- Tenement - The Blind Wink LP
- Tenement - The Self-Titled Album
- United Super Villains - Choke Slammed... LP
- Vacant State - Internal Conflict E.P.
- Vicious Cycle - Pale Blue Dot
- Violent Minds - We Are Nothing
- Wastoids - S/T 7-inch
- White Lung - Magazine 7-inch
- White Lung - It's the Evil
- White Lung - Sorry
- Food not Bombs - comp LP
- Wolfbrigade - Comalive

== See also ==
- List of record labels
- Canadian hardcore punk
