= Mish Barber-Way =

Canadian singer/songwriter and journalist

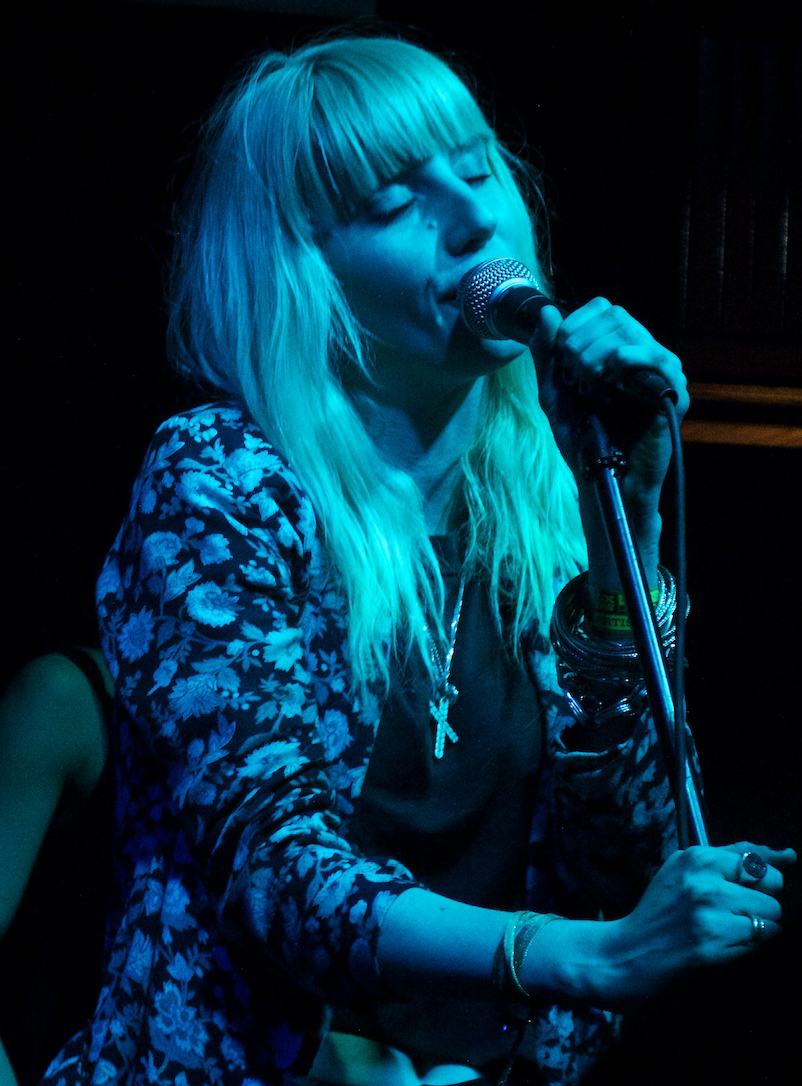
- Barber-Way performing with White Lung in South by Southwest, 2013

Background information
- Born: Mish Way; 15 July 1985 (age 40); Vancouver, British Columbia, Canada
- Occupations: Singer; songwriter; writer; journalist; editor
- Years active: 2006–present
- Spouse: Austin Barber (m. 2015)
- Website: mishway.com

Mish Barber-Way (born 15 July 1985) is a Canadian singer, songwriter and writer. She founded the band White Lung in 2006 and served as its vocalist until the band's breakup in 2022.

== Early life ==
Barber-Way was born on 15 July 1985 in Vancouver, British Columbia. As a child, she competed in figure skating before focusing on music and writing. In university, Barber-Way originally studied writing before switching to programs in philosophy and gender studies. During her post-secondary education, she worked as an intern for Vancouver Magazine and Hearty. During her teens, she worked as a dry cleaner.

== Career ==
Barber-Way started playing music in her former boyfriend's band before co-forming White Lung in 2006. While singing in White Lung, Barber-Way wrote articles for various media sources including Vice Media, Talkhouse, Hustler, The Guardian, i-D, Dazed, Los Angeles Times, V, among others. She is also the executive editor at Penthouse, as well as the music editor for BriteLite magazine. In 2016, Barber-Way performed a cover of "Used to Love Her" by Guns N' Roses. In 2021, she sang on The Bloody Beetroots's song "Radium Girls".

== Personal life ==
Barber-Way is married to Austin Barber of American rock band Saviours, and they live in the suburbs of Los Angeles, California with their children. In prior albums with White Lung, Barber-Way incorporated songs about her personal experience with body dysmorphia and addiction.
