= Bernard Ray =

Bernard Ray may refer to:

- Bernard J. Ray (1921–1944), United States Army officer and Medal of Honor recipient
- Bernard B. Ray (1895–1964), Russian-born American film producer and director
