= Baldwin Senior High School (New York) =

High school in Nassau County, New York, US

Baldwin High School
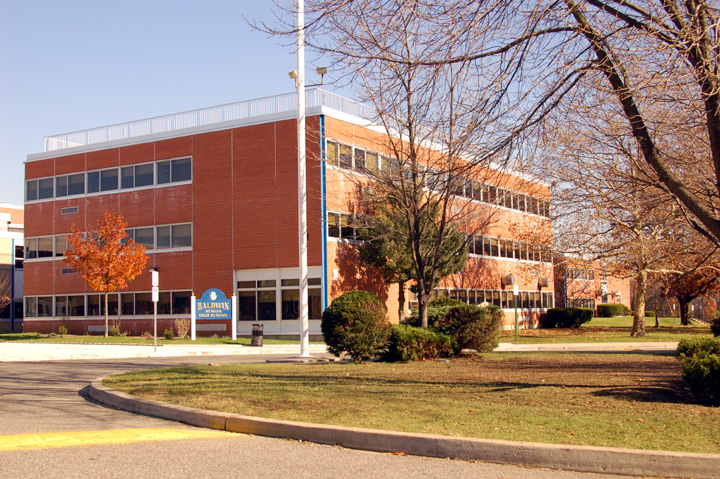

Location
- 841 Ethel T. Kloberg Drive; Baldwin, New York 11510; Nassau County; United States
- Coordinates: 40°40′02″N 73°36′18″W

Information
- Type: Public high school
- School district: Baldwin Union Free School District
- NCES School ID: 360384000128
- Principal: Neil Testa
- Teaching staff: 132.37 FTEs
- Grades: 9 to 12
- Enrollment: 1,505 (as of 2023–2024)
- Student to teacher ratio: 11.37
- Colors: Blue and gold
- Nickname: Bruins
- Accreditation: Blue Ribbon
- Website: School website

Baldwin High School is a public high school located in Baldwin, Nassau County, New York. This school serves students in grades 9 to 12 in the Baldwin Union Free School District. As of the 2023-24 school year, the school enrolled 1505 students.

In 1991, the U.S. Department of Education named the school a National Blue Ribbon School in recognition of its students' overall high academic achievement. Baldwin High School offers numerous opportunities in academics, athletics, the arts, and career development.

== Notable alumni ==
- Mandy Cohen (born 1978, class of 1996), physician and director of the U.S. Centers for Disease Control and Prevention
- Margaret Colin (born 1958, class of 1976), actress.
- Taylor Dayne (Leslie Wunderman) (born 1962, class of 1980), singer
- Scott Israel (born 1956/1957), sheriff of Broward County, Florida
- John J. Kedenburg (1946–1968), Vietnam War Medal of Honor recipient
- Joel Kovel (1936–2018), scholar and author known as a founder of eco-socialism
- Melanie Martinez (born 1995, class of 2013), singer/songwriter
- James McLurkin (born 1972, class of 1990), engineer
- Jasmin Moghbeli (born 1983), US Marine Corps test pilot and NASA astronaut
- Matthew Pittinsky
- Bernard J. Ray (1921–1944), World War II Medal of Honor recipient
- Jeff Rosenstock (born 1982, class of 1999), singer/songwriter
- Scott Rudin (born 1958, class of 1976), film producer and theatrical producer
- Dee Snider (born 1955, class of 1973), singer-songwriter, screenwriter, radio personality, and actor
- Brian Teta, television producer
- Chris Weidman (born 1984, class of 2002), wrestler
- Karen M. Williams (born 1963, class of 1981), district judge
