= Helen McClelland =

Helen McClelland may refer to:

- Helen Grace McClelland (1887–1984), American army nurse
- Margaret Moncrieff (1921–2008), Scottish writer using pseudonym "Helen McClelland"
