= Von Ancken =

Von Ancken is a surname. Notable people with the surname include:

- David Von Ancken (1964–2021), American film and television director and screenwriter
- Robert Von Ancken, American real estate appraiser
