= Long Island National Cemetery =

Historic veterans cemetery in Suffolk County, New York

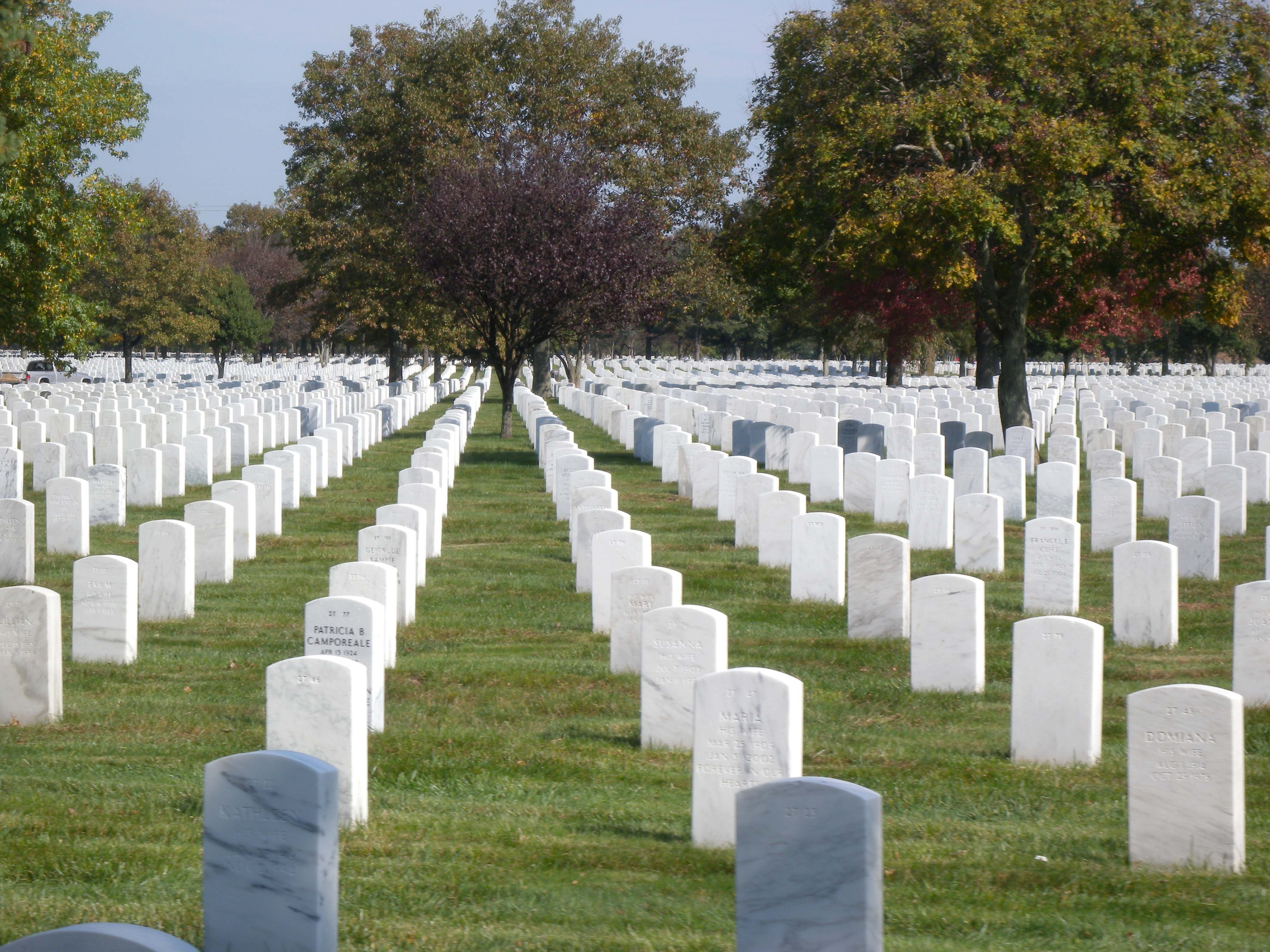
- Long Island National Cemetery
- Interactive map of Long Island National Cemetery

Details
- Established: 1936
- Location: Suffolk County, New York
- Country: United States
- Type: United States National Cemetery
- Owned by: U.S. Department of Veterans' Affairs
- Size: 364.7 acres (147.6 ha)
- No. of graves: 357,000+
- Website: Official
- Find a Grave: Long Island National Cemetery
- Long Island National Cemetery
- U.S. National Register of Historic Places
- Location within New York Location within the United States
- Location: Wyandanch and Melville, NY
- Coordinates: 40°45′23″N 73°23′45″W
- NRHP reference No.: 16000113
- Added to NRHP: March 22, 2016

Long Island National Cemetery is a United States National Cemetery located in Suffolk County, New York. It is surrounded by a group of other separate cemeteries and memorial parks situated along Wellwood Avenue (County Road 3) – these include Pinelawn Memorial Park, St. Charles / Resurrection Cemeteries, Beth Moses, New Montefiore and Mt. Ararat Cemeteries. Its mailing address is Farmingdale (postal code 11735). It borders East Farmingdale along its western edge and is located within the CDPS of Wyandanch (to the east), in the Town of Babylon, and Melville (to the north) in the Town of Huntington. Administered by the United States Department of Veterans Affairs, it encompasses 364.7 acres (147.6 ha), and as of 2021, had more than 357,000 interments.

In 2016 it was listed on the National Register of Historic Places.

== History ==
Long Island National Cemetery was established in 1936 with a purchase of 175 acres (71 ha) of land from Pinelawn Cemetery (a neighboring cemetery) to answer a need after World War I of a large number of veterans, and not enough burial space in the urban cemeteries in New York City. At the time the only National Cemetery in the area was Cypress Hills National Cemetery in Brooklyn, and it had very limited area available. The land was developed and burials began in March 1937. Within its first 8 years, it saw over 10,000 interments from World War II.

A section of the cemetery has the interments of World War II prisoners of war, including 37 Germans and 54 Italians. There are also 36 British Commonwealth servicemen buried here from the same war.

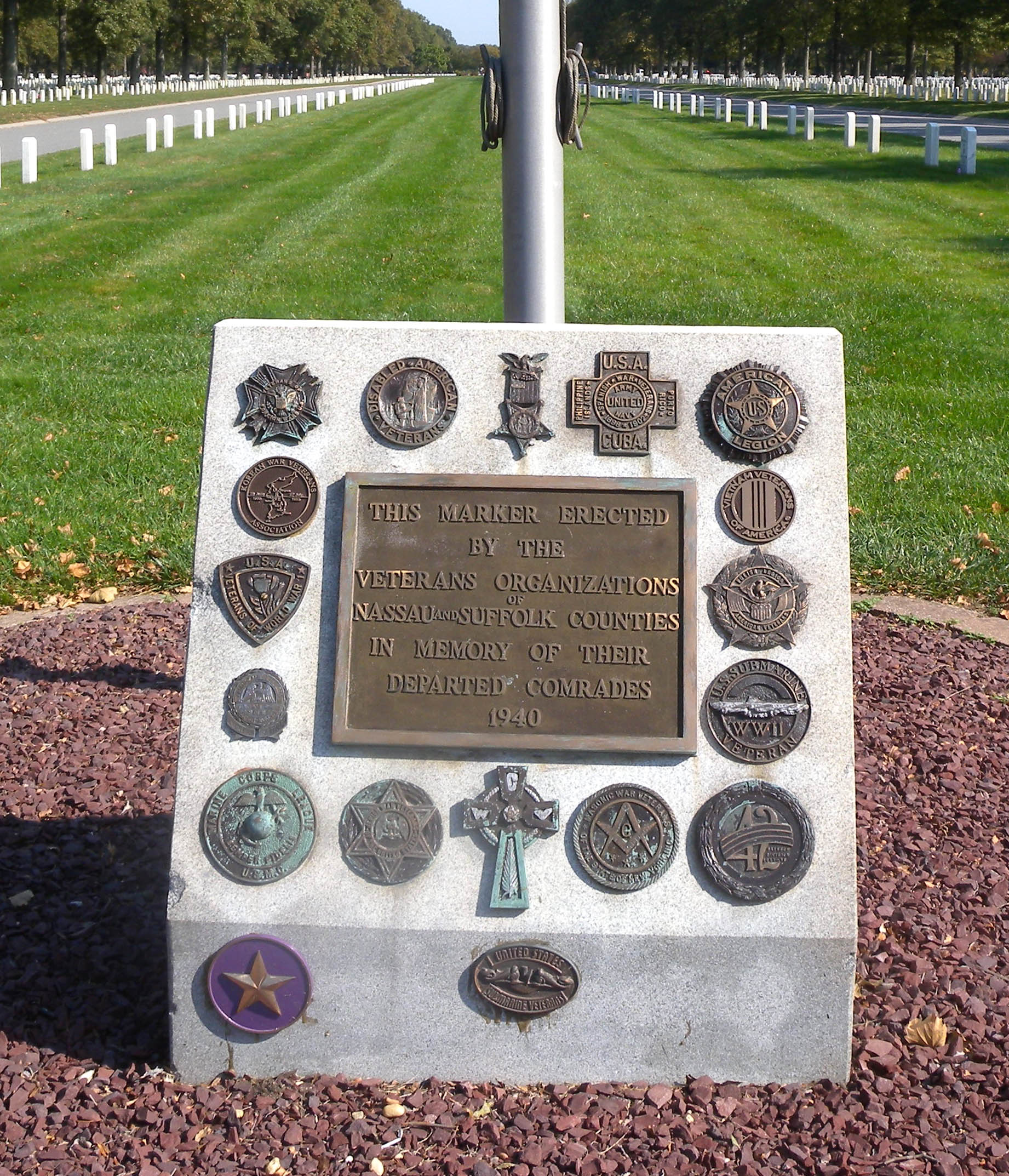
1940 marker

== Notable monuments ==
- A granite memorial to "Fallen Comrades of Nassau & Suffolk Counties" was erected in 1940.

== Notable interments ==
- Medal of Honor recipients
  - Seaman First Class Heinrich Behnke (1882–1952), for peacetime service aboard USS Iowa
  - Corporal Anthony Casamento (1920–1987), for action at the Battle of Guadalcanal during World War II
  - Gunner's Mate Third Class John Everetts (1877–1956), for peacetime service aboard USS Cushing
  - Gunner's Mate Third Class Robert Galbraith (1878–1949), for action in the Philippine–American War
  - Boatswain's Mate William Henry Gowan (1884–1957), for peacetime service in Coquimbo, Chile
  - First Sergeant Sydney G. Gumpertz (1879–1971), for action in World War I
  - Chief Watertender August Holtz (1871–1938), for peacetime service aboard USS North Dakota
  - Platoon Sergeant Joseph R. Julian (1918–1945 †), for action on Iwo Jima
  - First Lieutenant Stephen Edward Karopczyc (1944–1967 †), for action in the Vietnam War
  - Specialist Five John James Kedenburg (1946–1968 †), for action in the Vietnam War
  - Private First Class Carlos James Lozada (1946–1967 †), for action at the Battle of Dak To during the Vietnam War
  - Landsman Thomas Mitchell (1857–1942), for peacetime service aboard USS Richmond
  - Chief Boatswain's Mate Lauritz Nelson (1860–1941), for action aboard USS Nashville during the Spanish–American War
  - Sergeant Alfred B. Nietzel (1921–1944 †), for action in World War II
  - First Lieutenant Bernard James Ray (1921–1944 †), for action in World War II
  - Staff Sergeant Joseph Edward Schaefer (1921–1994), for action in World War II
  - Second Lieutenant Charles William Shea (1921–1994), for action in World War II
  - Private First Class William Henry Thompson (1927–1950 †), for action in the Korean War
  - Private Michael Valente (1895–1976), for action in World War I
  - Seaman James Aloysius Walsh (1897–1960), for action aboard USS Florida during the US occupation of Veracruz, Mexico
  - First Lieutenant John Earl Warren (1946–1969 †), for action in the Vietnam War
- Others
  - Major Jack A. Bade, test pilot, World War II fighter ace
  - Frank John Becker, US Congressman, World War I veteran
  - William Breitenbach, New York assemblyman, World War I veteran
  - Captain Lewis Broadus, Buffalo Soldier, veteran of the Spanish–American War, Philippean–American War, and World War I
  - Albert W. Brosch, professional golfer and World War II veteran
  - James Tim Brymn, jazz composer and conductor
  - T. Frederick Candlyn, organist, church musician and composer, World War I veteran
  - Samuel A. Countee, painter and sculptor
  - Captain Leon Dabo, artist, World War I veteran
  - Henry Dumas, writer and poet
  - Mignon G. Eberhart, author
  - James Fay, US Congressman, World War I veteran
  - Major Edmund Joseph 'Pat' Flaherty, professional athlete and actor
  - Max Gerlach, bootlegger who inspired the character of Jay Gatsby in The Great Gatsby
  - Enya Gonzalez, singer
  - Maurice Gosfield, comic actor and voice of Benny the Ball in Top Cat
  - Helen Kane, singer and model for Betty Boop
  - Alfred J. Kennedy, New York state politician, Spanish–American War veteran
  - Beatrice Mary MacDonald, nurse, World War I veteran
  - Granville 'Stick' McGhee, musician
  - Lionel Monagas, actor, World War I veteran
  - Jules Munshin, comedian, actor
  - Major George A. Murphy, New York Supreme Court justice, World War II veteran
  - Herbert Horatio 'Herbie' Nichols, jazz pianist and composer
  - William Redfield, actor, WWII infantryman
  - Major George K. Shuler, New York State Treasurer, World War I veteran
  - Frank Silvera, actor
  - Joe Simon, comic book writer and artist, co-creator of Captain America
  - Zutty Singleton, jazz musician
  - Richard J. Tonry, US Congressman, World War I veteran
  - Roy J. Waldron, racehorse trainer who won the 1940 Kentucky Derby

== See also ==
- List of cemeteries in New York
- National Register of Historic Places listings in Babylon (town), New York
- National Register of Historic Places listings in Huntington (town), New York
