= Robert Galbraith =

Robert Galbraith may refer to:

- Robert Galbraith (judge) (died 1543), Scottish Lord of Session
- Robert Galbraith (1483−1544), Scottish logician who taught with Juan de Celaya
- Robert Leslie Thomas Galbraith (1841–1924), Irish-born merchant and political figure in British Columbia
- Robert Sharpe Galbraith (1857–1890), Mayor of Tauranga, New Zealand (1889–1890)
- Robert Galbraith (Medal of Honor) (1878–1949), United States Navy Gunner's Mate, 3rd class
- Robert Galbraith, a pen name of J. K. Rowling

== See also ==
- Rob Galbraith, photographer and photojournalism teacher
- Robert Galbraith Heath (1915–1999), American psychiatrist
