= Bernard J. Ray =

United States Army Medal of Honor recipient

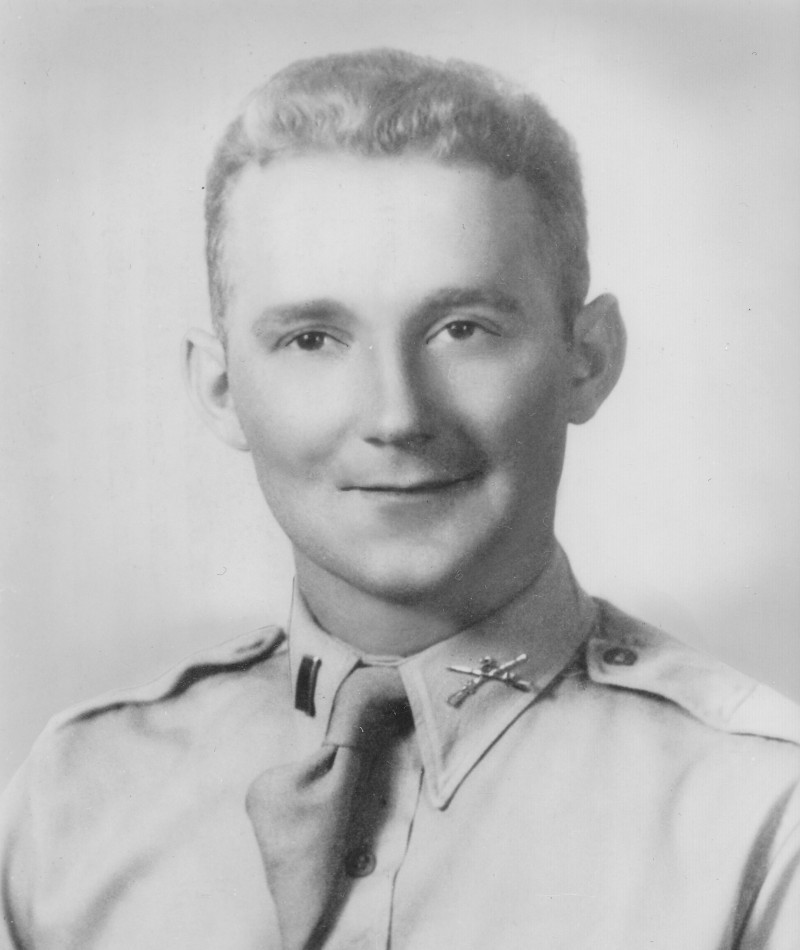
- Born: June 9, 1921; Brooklyn, New York, US
- Died: November 17, 1944 (aged 23) near Schevenhütte, Hurtgen Forest, Germany
- Burial place: Long Island National Cemetery, Farmingdale, New York
- Military career
- Allegiance: United States
- Branch: United States Army
- Service years: 1943–1944
- Rank: First Lieutenant
- Units: Company F, 8th Infantry Regiment, 4th Infantry Division
- Conflicts: World War II; *Battle of Hurtgen Forest †
- Awards: Medal of Honor; Bronze Star Medal; Purple Heart

Bernard James Ray (June 9, 1921 – November 17, 1944) was a United States Army officer and a recipient of the United States military's highest decoration—the Medal of Honor—for his actions in World War II during the Battle of Hurtgen Forest.

== Biography ==
Ray was born in Brooklyn, New York City and raised in Baldwin, New York. After graduating from Baldwin High School, he went to work at the Sperry Gyroscope Company manufacturing plant in Brooklyn. Ray volunteered for military service in June 1942.

Ray joined the Army in 1943, and by November 17, 1944 was serving as a First Lieutenant in Company F, 8th Infantry Regiment, 4th Infantry Division. On that day, in the Hurtgen Forest near Schevenhütte, Germany, Ray exposed himself to intense enemy fire in an attempt to destroy a wire obstacle that was blocking his unit's path. Seriously wounded while setting up an explosive charge to blow up the obstacle, he realized that he would not be able to accomplish his mission if he did not detonate the charge immediately. Ray set off the explosives, killing himself but successfully destroying the wire barricade. He was posthumously awarded the Medal of Honor a year later, on December 8, 1945.

Ray, aged 23 at his death, was buried at the Henri-Chapelle American Cemetery in Belgium. In 1947, his remains were returned to the United States and reburied at Long Island National Cemetery, Farmingdale, New York.

== Medal of Honor citation ==
First Lieutenant Ray's official Medal of Honor citation reads:

He was platoon leader with Company F, 8th Infantry, on November 17, 1944, during the drive through the Hurtgen Forest near Schevenhutte, Germany. The American forces attacked in wet, bitterly cold weather over rough, wooded terrain, meeting brutal resistance from positions spaced throughout the forest behind minefields and wire obstacles. Small arms, machinegun, mortar, and artillery fire caused heavy casualties in the ranks when Company F was halted by a concertina-type wire barrier. Under heavy fire, 1st Lt. Ray reorganized his men and prepared to blow a path through the entanglement, a task which appeared impossible of accomplishment and from which others tried to dissuade him. With implacable determination to clear the way, he placed explosive caps in his pockets, obtained several bangalore torpedoes, and then wrapped a length of highly explosive primer cord about his body. He dashed forward under direct fire, reached the barbed wire and prepared his demolition charge as mortar shells, which were being aimed at him alone, came steadily nearer his completely exposed position. He had placed a torpedo under the wire and was connecting it to a charge he carried when he was severely wounded by a bursting mortar shell. Apparently realizing that he would fail in his self-imposed mission unless he completed it in a few moments he made a supremely gallant decision. With the primer cord still wound about his body and the explosive caps in his pocket, he completed a hasty wiring system and unhesitatingly thrust down on the handle of the charger, destroying himself with the wire barricade in the resulting blast. By the deliberate sacrifice of his life, 1st Lt. Ray enabled his company to continue its attack, resumption of which was of positive significance in gaining the approaches to the Cologne Plain.

== Awards and decorations ==
Lieutenant Ray received the following awards for his service

Badge	Combat Infantryman Badge		
1st row	Medal of Honor	Bronze Star Medal Retroactively Awarded, 1947	Purple Heart
2nd row	American Campaign Medal	European–African–Middle Eastern Campaign Medal with Arrowhead Device and 1 Campaign star	World War II Victory Medal
Unit awards	Presidential Unit Citation		

== Legacy ==
In 1947, the Victory ship SS Lehigh Victory was renamed USAT Lt. Bernard J. Ray in his honor. On November 11, 1947, a memorial park in his hometown of Baldwin, New York was dedicated in his honor. The park now also commemorates Vietnam War Medal of Honor recipient John J. Kedenburg and other military veterans. Ray's remains were returned to the United States in 1947 and reburied at Long Island National Cemetery on December 8, 1947.

== See also ==
- List of Medal of Honor recipients
- List of Medal of Honor recipients for World War II
