= Jack A. Bade =

American flying ace (1920–1963)

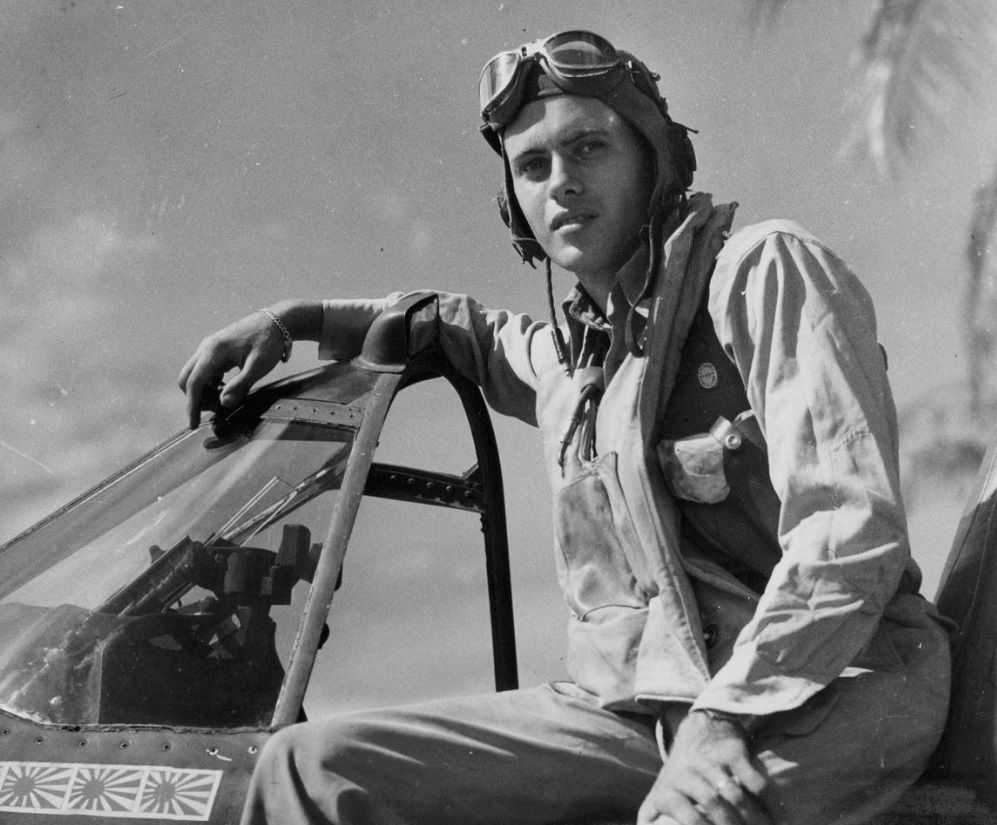
- Bade in 1943
- Born: October 9, 1920; Minneapolis, Minnesota, U.S.
- Died: May 2, 1963 (aged 42) over Catskill Mountains, New York, U.S.
- Burial place: Long Island National Cemetery
- Military career
- Allegiance: United States
- Branch: United States Army Air Forces
- Service years: 1942–1945
- Rank: Major
- Service number: O-727378
- Units: 44th Fighter Squadron, 18th Fighter Group
- Conflicts: World War II
- Awards: Distinguished Service Cross; Distinguished Flying Cross; Purple Heart; Air Medal (10)

Jack Albrecht Bade (October 9, 1920 – May 2, 1963) was an American flying ace in the 18th Fighter Group during World War II.

== Early life ==
Bade was born on October 9, 1920, in Minneapolis, the only child of Charles and Gladys Bade. Following his birth, his family moved to Elk River, Minnesota, where he grew up. After graduating from high school in 1938, he attended the University of Minnesota where he majored in engineering. For a brief time, he worked with Honeywell Corporation.

== Military career ==
On January 5, 1942, Bade enlisted in the Aviation Cadet Program of the United States Army Air Forces and on July 26, 1942, he was commissioned a second lieutenant and awarded pilot wings at Luke Field in Arizona. During this time, he made a cameo in the 1942 film Thunderbirds.

=== World War II ===
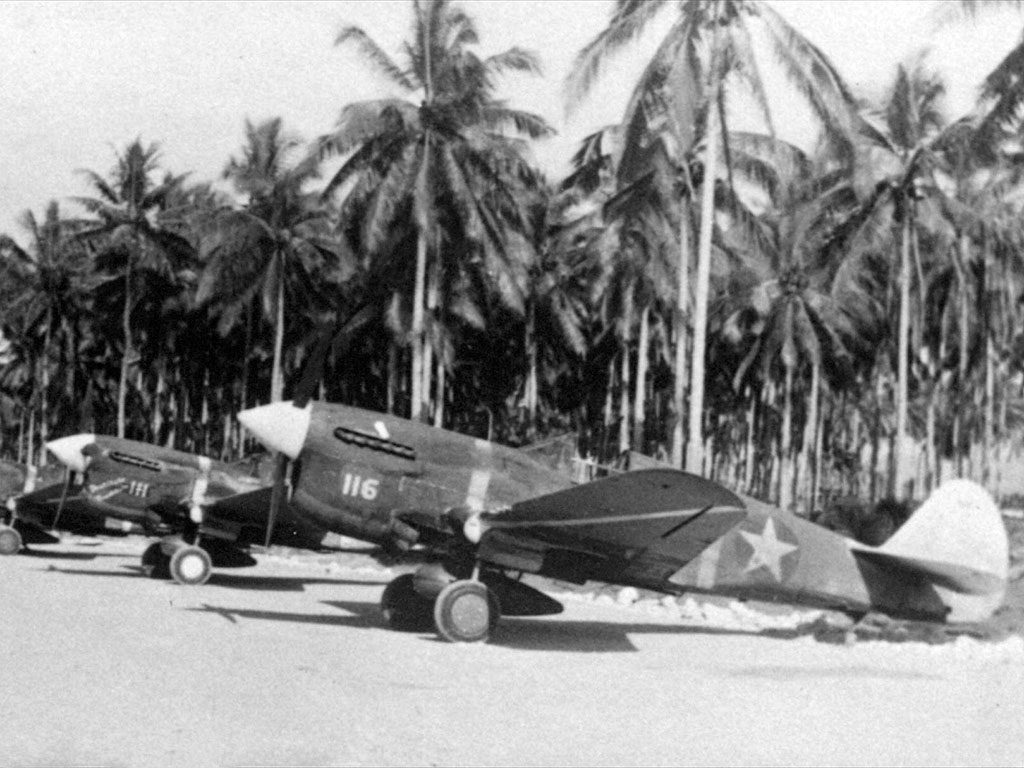
P-40s "White 116" and "White 111" were flown by the aces 1Lt Henry E. Matson and 1Lt Jack Bade, 44th FS, at the time part of AirSols, on Guadalcanal

In December 1942, following the completion of advanced fighter training, Bade was assigned as a P-40 Warhawk pilot with the 44th Fighter Squadron of the 18th Fighter Group in Solomon Islands. The 18th FG was part of the AirSols, which was a combined, joint command of Allied air units in the Solomon Islands campaign of the war. On February 4, 1943, he scored his first aerial victory. On February 13, while taking part in the escort of Navy and Marine Corps bombers attacking enemy shipping near Shortland-Kahili area, he shot down a A6M Zero that was attempting to attack the bomber formation. However, he was quickly attacked by four Zeros, resulting in damage to his P-40 including the guns being jammed and Bade himself suffering a head injury. Despite this, after seeing ten Zeros chasing four unescorted SBD Dauntlesses over Guadalcanal, he flew directly towards the Zeros and engaged in several aerial maneuvers in an attempt to distract the Zeros from chasing the SBDs. Bade's actions resulted in the Zeros running low on fuel and returning to the base, hence preventing them from chasing the SBDs. For his heroism in the mission, Bade was awarded the Distinguished Service Cross.

After his recovery and promotion to first lieutenant, Bade continued to fly more missions. On June 7 and 16, 1943, he shot down his third and fourth enemy aircraft. On June 30, while protecting Allied ships near Rendova Island, he shot down a Nakajima E8N "Dave" floatplane, his fifth aerial victory and earned the title of flying ace.

During the war, Bade was credited in destroying five enemy aircraft and one probable while flying a total of 85 missions and 210 hours. His exploits were featured in True Comics and Heroic Comics.

In late 1943, Bade was promoted to captain and returned to the United States where he served as an instructor pilot and later was assigned by Republic Aviation to coordinate the P-47 Thunderbolt inspection and flight test program in Evansville, Indiana. Following the end of World War II, he was discharged from military service in 1946, at the rank of major.

== Later life ==
On February 9, 1945, Bade married Geraldine Davis, later Ferguson (1924–2013). The couple had three sons and one daughter.

After his discharge from the military, Bade worked as a civilian test pilot with Republic Aviation. In 1949, while flying a F-84 Thunderjet, he survived a 500-mile-per-hour (800 km/h) crash by bailing out at 12,000 feet (3,700 m). In 1956 and 1962, he was featured in the advertisements of Camel cigarettes and Chase Manhattan Bank.

On May 2, 1963, while test flying a F-105 Thunderchief at the speed of sound, he collided with another F-105 flown by test pilot Don Seaver, over the Catskill Mountains in New York, killing both of them. Bade was buried at Long Island National Cemetery.

== Awards and decorations ==

United States Army Air Forces pilot badge
Distinguished Service Cross
Distinguished Flying Cross	Purple Heart	Air Medal with one silver and three bronze oak leaf clusters and one gold star
American Campaign Medal	Asiatic-Pacific Campaign Medal with four bronze campaign stars	World War II Victory Medal

=== Distinguished Service Cross citation ===
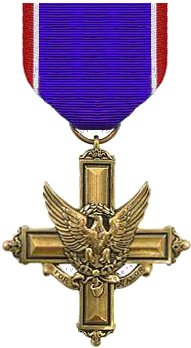

Bade, Jack A.
Second Lieutenant, U.S. Army Air Forces
44th Fighter Squadron, 18th Fighter Group, Thirteenth Air Force
Date of Action: February 13, 1943

Citation:

The President of the United States of America, authorized by Act of Congress, July 9, 1918, takes pleasure in presenting the Distinguished Service Cross to Second Lieutenant (Air Corps) Jack Albrecht Bade, United States Army Air Forces, for extraordinary heroism in connection with military operations against an armed enemy while serving as Pilot of a P-40 Fighter Airplane in the 44th Fighter Squadron, 18th Fighter Group, Thirteenth Air Force, in aerial combat against enemy forces on 13 February 1943, in the Southwest Pacific Theater of Operations. While leading part of a fighter sweep preceding a bombing raid on hostile shipping in the Shortland-Kahili area, First Lieutenant Bade fought back desperately against intercepting Zeros which struck from behind and below. When his crippled wingman fell off in a smoking dive, he followed him down until his own plane was tailed by four Japanese fighters whose disintegrating fire riddled his wings and fuselage and jammed his guns. Immediately afterward, although bleeding profusely from a deep head wound, he flew to the defense of several of our bombers which had been stripped of fighter cover and were being attacked by a swarm of Zeros. Undeterred by complete lack of fire power and suffering great pain, he put his damaged plane through a series of headlong passes with such formidable aggressiveness that the Japanese airmen broke off their fight and fled. His heroic perseverance and superb flying skill were in keeping with the highest traditions of the United States Naval Service.

== Aerial victory credits ==
Date	Credits
February 4, 1943	1
February 13, 1943	1
June 7, 1943	1
June 16, 1943	1
June 30, 1943	1
