= Daniel Atkins =

United States Navy sailor

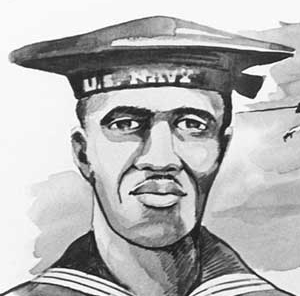
- U.S. Navy poster featuring Daniel Atkins.
- Born: November 18, 1866; Brunswick County, Virginia, US
- Died: May 11, 1923 (aged 56); Portsmouth, Virginia, US
- Burial place: Captain Ted Conaway Memorial Naval Cemetery
- Military career
- Allegiance: United States of America
- Branch: United States Navy
- Service years: 1888 - 1921
- Rank: Chief Commissary Steward
- Unit: USS Cushing (TB-1)
- Awards: Medal of Honor

Daniel Atkins (November 18, 1866 – May 11, 1923) was a United States Navy sailor and a recipient of America's highest military decoration, the Medal of Honor.

== Biography ==
Atkins was born on November 18, 1866, in Brunswick, Virginia. He enlisted in the U.S. Navy from the same state in January 1888. While serving as Ship's Cook First Class on the USS Cushing, at sea on February 11, 1898, he and Gunner's Mate Third Class John Everetts attempted to save the drowning officer Ensign Joseph Breckinridge, who had fallen overboard. For their conduct on this occasion, both Atkins and Everetts were recipients of the Medal of Honor. Atkins later obtained the rank of Chief Commissary Steward and retired in October 1921.

Atkins died on May 11, 1923, in Portsmouth, Virginia, and was buried in Captain Ted Conaway Memorial Naval Cemetery located in Portsmouth.

== Medal of Honor citation ==
Rank and organization: Ship's Cook, First Class, U.S. Navy. Born: 1867, Brunswick, Va. Accredited to: Virginia. G.O. No.: 489, May 20, 1898.

Citation:

On board the U.S.S. Cushing, 11 February 1898. Showing gallant conduct, Atkins attempted to save the life of the late Ens. Joseph C. Breckenridge, U.S. Navy, who fell overboard at sea from that vessel on this date.

== See also ==
- List of Medal of Honor recipients
- List of Medal of Honor recipients in non-combat incidents
