= Bob Beckwith =

American firefighter in New York City (1932–2024)

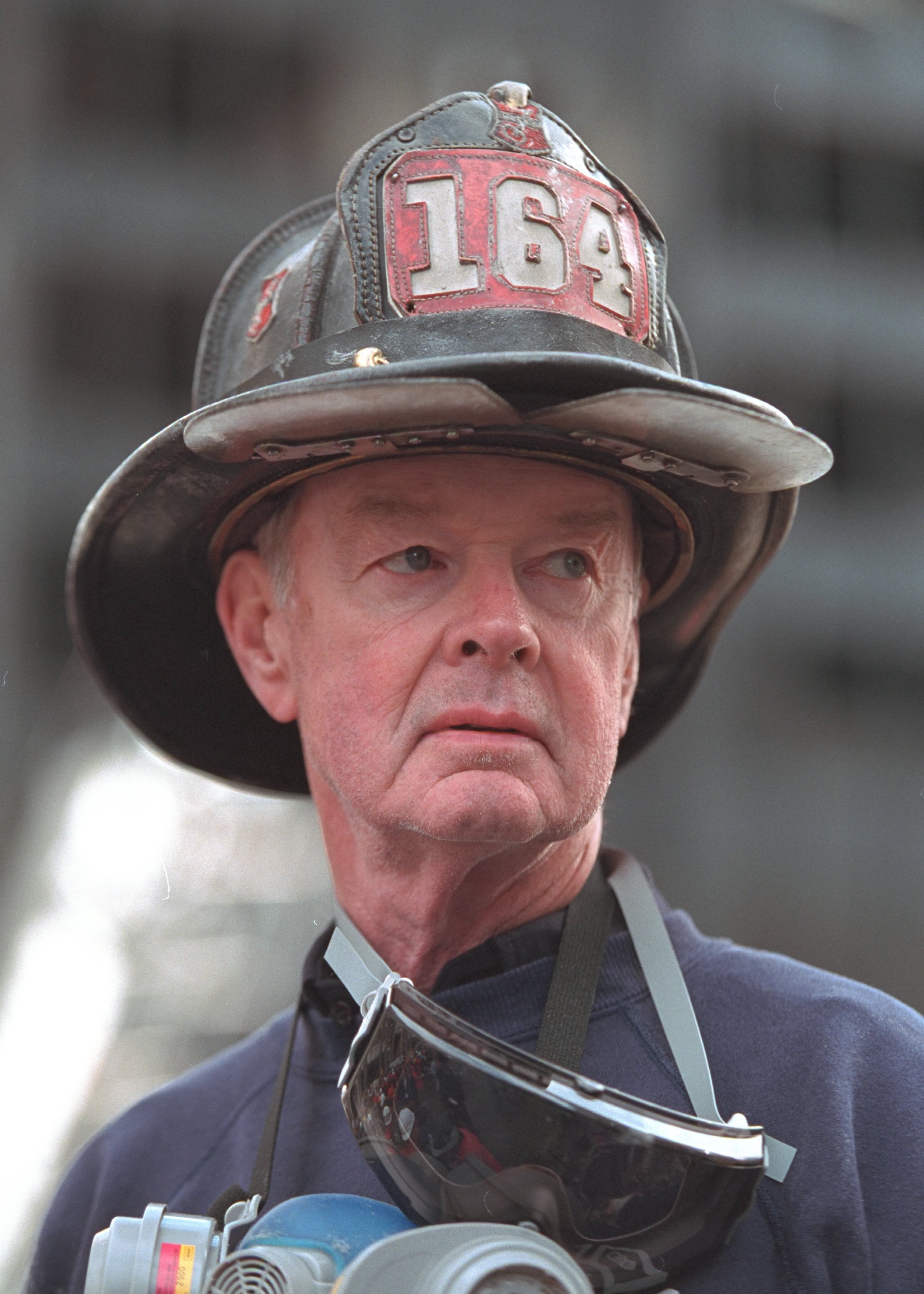
- Beckwith on September 14, 2001
- Born: Robert Beckwith; April 16, 1932; New York City, U.S.
- Died: February 4, 2024 (aged 91); Rockville Centre, New York, U.S.
- Occupation: Firefighter
- Children: 6

Robert Beckwith (April 16, 1932 – February 4, 2024) was an American firefighter. As a member of the New York City Fire Department, he became well known to the American public after he stood next to President George W. Bush as Bush gave a speech at the ruins of the World Trade Center after the attacks of September 11, 2001.

Photos of Beckwith and the president appeared on the front page of the New York Daily News and the cover of Time magazine. This exposure launched him into the national spotlight and led to press attention and interviews. Beckwith later met several times with President Bush, spoke extensively in public, and acted as a fundraiser for charities.

== Career ==
Born in Astoria, Queens, New York City, on April 16, 1932, Beckwith was a veteran of the New York City Fire Department with 30 years of service from 1964 to 1994.

=== Actions at Ground Zero ===
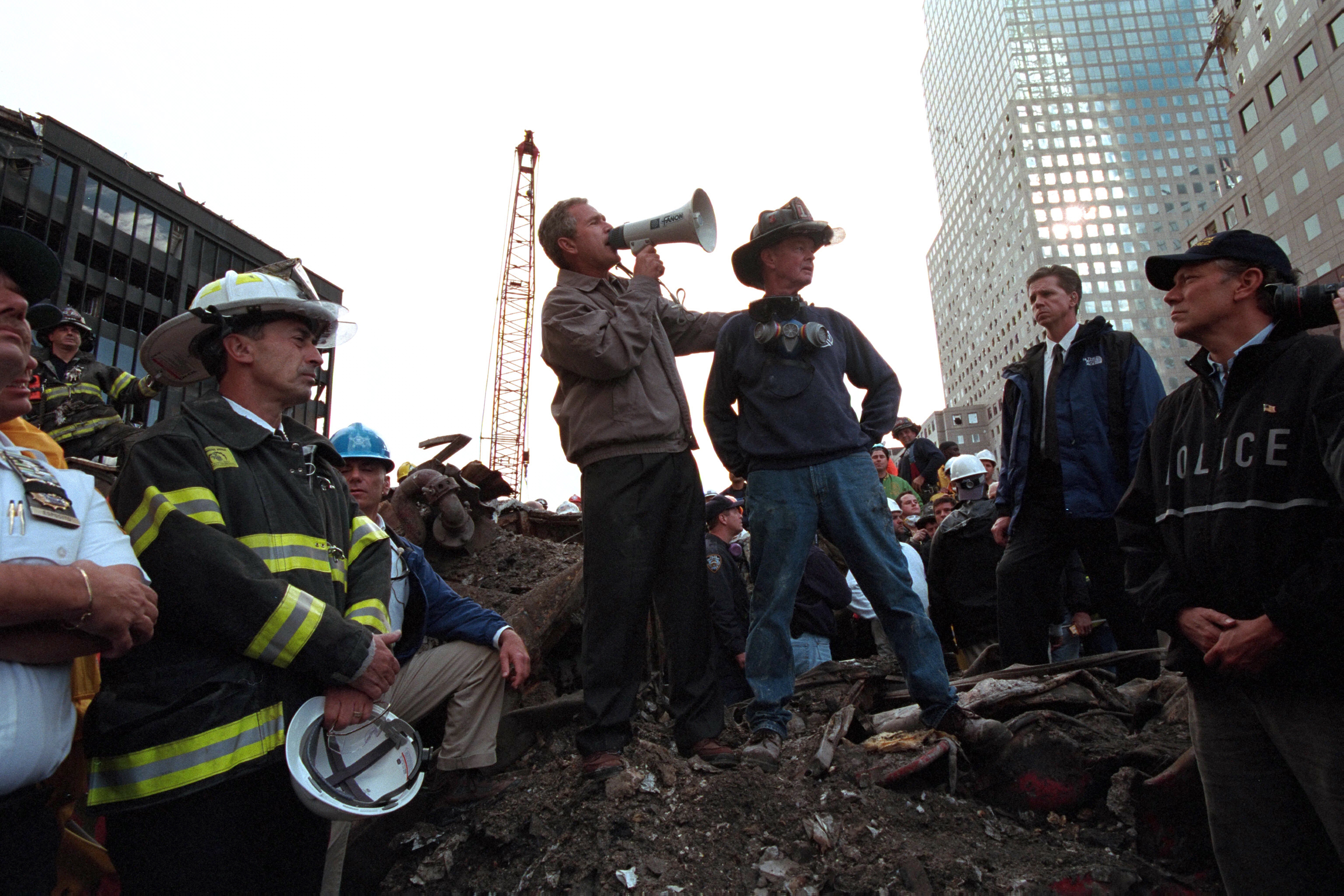
U.S. President George W. Bush speaking at Ground Zero with Beckwith beside him

On the morning of September 11, 2001, Beckwith was tending to his grandson, who had been hit by a car while biking to school. Before he arrived at the hospital with his grandson, Beckwith was aware that a plane had struck the World Trade Center. When the boy appeared to be in stable condition, Beckwith left the hospital and went to the World Trade Center site after he saw the South Tower collapse on television. Even though he had been retired for seven years from the New York City Fire Department, he grabbed his old gear and bluffed his way past the blockades and barricades that had been set up and began helping with bucket brigades and missing person searches.

President George W. Bush speaking at Ground Zero with Beckwith beside him

On September 14, after Beckwith and some others had unearthed a fire engine buried in rubble from the fallen buildings, they tested its stability as a stand from which to speak; a Secret Service agent ordered Beckwith to help President Bush onto the platform. Beckwith handed Bush a megaphone with which to address the crowd of responders and workers and was told to climb down by the Secret Service and Karl Rove, but Bush insisted that Beckwith stay with him. An image of Bush with Beckwith was featured the next day on the front page of the New York Daily News.

=== National fame and activities after 9/11 ===
A photo of Bush with Beckwith standing together was published two weeks later on the cover of Time magazine, catapulting Beckwith to the national spotlight. Rejecting his new-found fame, he initially refused to speak to various news personalities and shows—Diane Sawyer, the Today Show, and Rosie O'Donnell—though he eventually appeared on MSNBC and other news channels and programs.

Beckwith was always bashful about his fame, though an enlarged version of the Time magazine cover that made him famous hung in his den. Regarding the cover, Beckwith said that "[a]ll these guys that come over to interview me, they all have to have a picture of it." Beckwith also had a first edition print of the cover, which was encased in a display box together with a flag that waved at Ground Zero, given to him by President Bush. Beckwith volunteered his items to go to the 9/11 Memorial after he died. He had already donated the clothes and helmet that he wore that day to the memorial before his death.

Beckwith visited 11 times with President Bush, traveled and spoke extensively, and dedicated much of his activity to fundraising for the New York Firefighters Burn Center Foundation.

On February 25, 2002, in a White House ceremony together with Governor George Pataki of New York state, Beckwith presented to Bush the bullhorn the president had used to address workers at the World Trade Center site just days after the attacks.

In the wake of the killing of Osama bin Laden in 2011 by a team of U.S. Navy SEALs, Beckwith was asked his opinion. He stated: "I would have liked it to be on George Bush's watch, but it wasn't, so OK." He also said: "But I'm glad we got him. He's burning in hell and he's going to rot there."

== Personal life and death ==
Beckwith lived for more than 50 years with his wife Barbara in the same house in Baldwin, Nassau County, New York. The couple had six adult children.

Beckwith died from cancer in Rockville Centre, New York, on February 4, 2024, at the age of 91. He had been in hospice care after receiving cancer treatments, according to Beckwith's grandson.
