= William Henry Gowan =

- Born: June 2, 1884; Rye, New York, US
- Died: May 22, 1957 (aged 72); New York City, US
- Burial place: Long Island National Cemetery, Farmingdale, New York
- Military career
- Allegiance: United States
- Branch: United States Navy
- Service years: c. 1907–1942
- Rank: Boatswain
- Unit: USS New York (BB-34)
- Awards: Medal of Honor

William Henry Gowan (June 2, 1884 – May 22, 1957) was a United States Navy sailor and a recipient of the United States military's highest decoration, the Medal of Honor. He was awarded the medal for his fire-fighting efforts during a blaze in Coquimbo, Chile. Gowan went on to have a 35-year Navy career, eventually becoming a warrant officer before his retirement.

== Biography ==
Gowan was born in Rye, New York, on June 2, 1884, and joined the Navy from that state in about 1907. By January 20, 1909, he was serving as a boatswain's mate on a ship in the 2nd Division of the United States Pacific Fleet. On that evening, while the division was anchored off Coquimbo, Chile, a fire broke out at a hotel in the city. Gowan was among a group of U.S. sailors, led by Captain Bradley A. Fiske, who went ashore and attempted to extinguish the blaze. The group was unable to save the hotel, but successfully kept the fire from spreading to nearby buildings. For their actions during the incident, Gowan and another man, Shipfitter First Class George Huber Wheeler, were awarded the Medal of Honor two months later, on March 19.

Gowan's official Medal of Honor citation reads:

For bravery and extraordinary heroism displayed by him during a conflagration in Coquimbo, Chile, 20 January 1909.

While serving on the USS New York (BB-34) in 1916, Gowan was promoted to chief boatswain's mate. He was promoted to the warrant officer rank of boatswain on September 20, 1918. He retired from the Navy in 1942, after 35 years of service.

As a civilian, Gowan worked for the Waterbury Rope Sales Corporation in Brooklyn. He died at work of a heart attack on May 22, 1957, at age 72. His body lay unclaimed for a week before his only remaining close relative, a sister named Ella Wickwire, could be located. In the meantime, the Navy made funeral arrangements for Gowan, who left behind no money for a burial. With his sister's permission, the Navy held a funeral service at the Universal Funeral Chapel in Manhattan on May 29 and buried Gowan at Long Island National Cemetery later that day.

== See also ==
- List of Medal of Honor recipients
