= Beatrice Mary MacDonald =

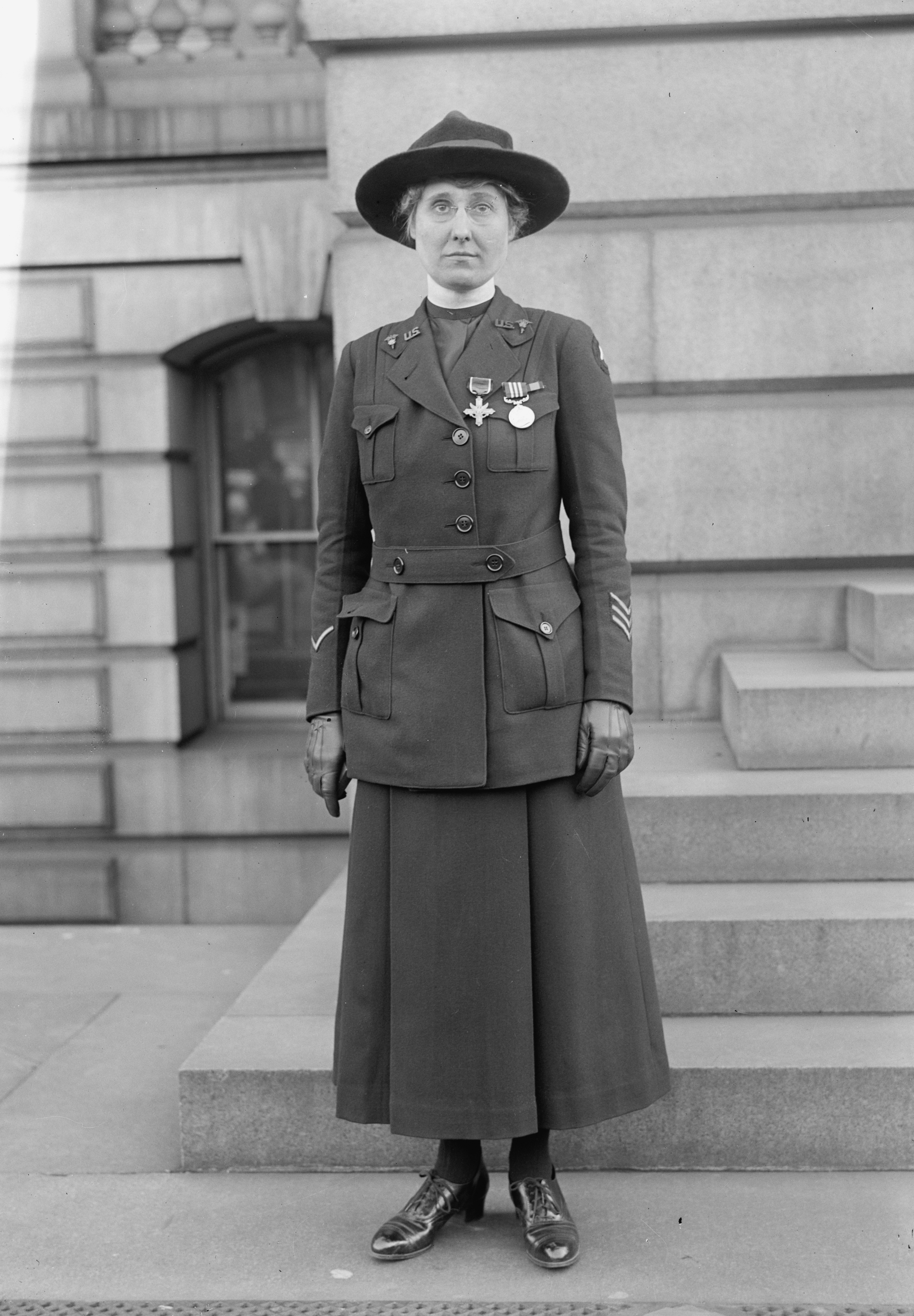
MacDonald in 1919

Beatrice Mary MacDonald, ARRC (September 27, 1881 – September 4, 1969) was a Canadian-born American nurse who served in the United States Army Nurse Corps during World War I. On January 4, 1936, she received a Purple Heart for combat wounds during World War I, making her (retroactively) the first woman to receive the award. MacDonald was also one of four women to receive the United States Distinguished Service Cross for her heroism during World War I. Other awards for her heroism included the French Croix de Guerre (Bronze), the British Military Medal for gallantry, the British Royal Red Cross (Second Class) medal, and the United States Distinguished Service Medal.

== Early life and education ==
MacDonald was born in the North Bedeque community on Prince Edward Island in Canada. She relocated to New York City to further her education and graduated from New York City Hospital Nursing School.

== World War I ==
MacDonald was living in New York City during the outbreak of World War I. In 1915, she volunteered for the American Ambulance Service and went to the American Hospital of Paris for a short stint. After returning to the United States, she went to work for the New York surgeon George Emerson Brewer as an office manager.

MacDonald enlisted in the United States Army Nurse Corps in 1917 with a unit from Presbyterian Hospital. She served in France at the British Casualty Clearing Station No. 61. On August 17, 1917, MacDonald was injured during a German air raid on the front line during the Third Battle of Ypres.

Despite the continued German bombardment, MacDonald's colleague Helen Grace McClelland stopped the bleeding on her face, permitting her to be evacuated to the American Expeditionary Forces ophthalmic center at Boulogne, France. The doctors there were unfortunately unable to prevent the loss of one of her eyes, but she insisted on resuming duty six weeks later. In May 1918, MacDonald returned to service at the front lines as chief nurse of Evacuation Hospital No. 2, serving there until January 1919.

== Recognition and awards ==
MacDonald received the Distinguished Service Cross from the United States Congress on February 27, 1919, making her the first woman to receive the award and one of only three women during World War I. Other awards at the time for her heroism included the French Croix de Guerre (Bronze), the British Military Medal for gallantry, the British Royal Red Cross (Second Class) medal, and the United States Distinguished Service Medal.

=== Distinguished Service Cross ===
The President of the United States of America, authorized by Act of Congress, July 9, 1918, takes pleasure in presenting the Distinguished Service Cross to Reserve Nurse Beatrice Mary MacDonald, United States Army Nurse Corps, for extraordinary heroism while serving with Nurse Corps, A.E.F. (Attached), while on duty with the surgical team at the British Casualty Clearing Station No. 61, British Area, 17 August 1917. During a German night air raid Nurse MacDonald continued at her post of duty, caring for the sick and wounded until seriously wounded by a German bomb, thereby losing one eye.

=== Purple Heart ===
After General Douglas MacArthur created the Purple Heart for combat wounds, MacDonald applied for and received the first Purple Heart awarded to a woman, on January 4, 1936. By both her date of injury and her award date, she is the first woman to be awarded a Purple Heart.

== Later life ==
In her later years, MacDonald lived in Manhattan. She died on September 4, 1969 and was interred with full military honors at Long Island National Cemetery.
