= Lauritz Nelson =

United States Navy Medal of Honor recipient (1860–1941)

- Born: March 26, 1860; Norway
- Died: September 16, 1941 (aged 81); Farmingdale, New York, US
- Burial place: Long Island National Cemetery, Farmingdale, New York
- Military career
- Allegiance: United States
- Branch: United States Navy
- Service years: 1885–1905
- Rank: Chief Boatswain's Mate
- Unit: USS Nashville
- Conflicts: Spanish–American War
- Awards: Medal of Honor

Lauritz Nelson (March 26, 1860 – September 16, 1941) was a sailor serving in the United States Navy during the Spanish–American War who received the Medal of Honor for bravery.

== Biography ==
Nelson was born March 26, 1860, in Norway and entered the US Navy in 1885. Later he was sent to fight in the Spanish–American War aboard the torpedo boat USS Nashville as a sailmaker's mate.

Lauritz retired from the navy in 1905 with the rank of Chief Boatswain's Mate. He died September 16, 1941, and is buried at Long Island National Cemetery in Farmingdale, New York.

== Medal of Honor citation ==
Rank and organization: Sailmaker's Mate, U.S. Navy. Born: 26 March 1860, Norway. G.O. No.: 521, 7 July 1899.

Citation:

On board the U.S.S. Nashville during the operation of cutting the cable leading from Cienfuegos, Cuba, 11 May 1898. Facing the heavy fire of the enemy, Nelson displayed extraordinary bravery and coolness throughout this action.

== See also ==
- List of Medal of Honor recipients for the Spanish–American War
