= Bullhorn Address =

2001 speech by George W. Bush

- Part of September 11 attacks
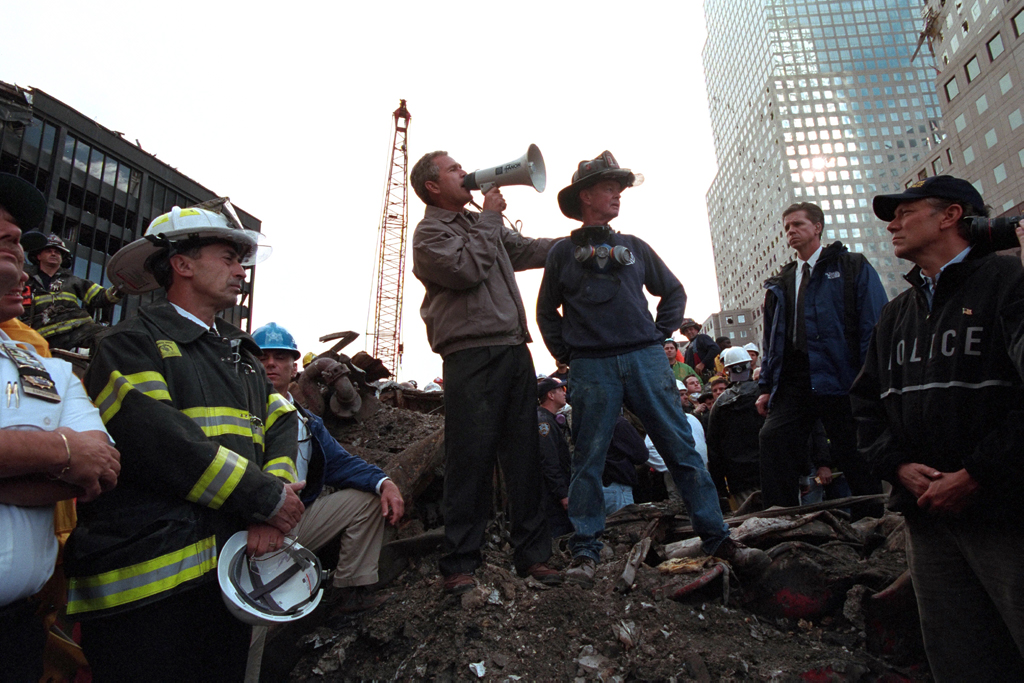
- Date: September 14, 2001
- Type: Speech
- Theme: Remembrance and resolve following the September 11 attacks
- Cause: September 11 attacks on the World Trade Center
- Motive: Consoling rescue and recovery workers at Ground Zero; pledging that those responsible for the attacks would be held accountable
- Participants: President George W. Bush; retired FDNY firefighter Bob Beckwith; rescue and recovery workers at Ground Zero

The Bullhorn Address, also known as the Bullhorn Speech, was a brief, largely impromptu speech delivered by President George W. Bush on September 14, 2001, at Ground Zero, the site of the collapsed World Trade Center Twin Towers in Lower Manhattan, New York City. Speaking through a bullhorn while standing atop a wrecked fire truck alongside retired firefighter Bob Beckwith, Bush thanked rescue and recovery workers for their efforts in the aftermath of the September 11 attacks and pledged that those responsible would be brought to justice.

The address became one of the most widely remembered moments of Bush's presidency, in part due to an unscripted exchange in which a worker in the crowd shouted "I can't hear you," and Bush responded, "I can hear you! I can hear you! The rest of the world hears you! And the people who knocked these buildings down will hear all of us soon!" The remark was met with sustained chants of "U.S.A.! U.S.A.!" from the assembled workers. The moment is frequently cited by political commentators and public-speaking analysts as an example of effective, spontaneous rhetoric, and contributed to a significant, if temporary, rise in Bush's public approval ratings.

== Background ==
On the morning of September 11, 2001, two hijacked passenger aircraft were flown into the Twin Towers of the World Trade Center in Lower Manhattan, causing both towers to collapse. The attacks, part of a coordinated series that also struck the Pentagon and resulted in the crash of United Airlines Flight 93 in Pennsylvania, killed nearly 3,000 people. In the days that followed, thousands of firefighters, police officers, and construction and recovery workers searched the rubble of the World Trade Center site, which became known as Ground Zero, for survivors and remains.

On September 13, 2001, President Bush signed a proclamation declaring September 14 a "National Day of Prayer and Remembrance" and spoke at a memorial service at Washington National Cathedral that morning. Later that day, he traveled to New York City to visit Ground Zero, meet with rescue workers, and console victims' families.

== The address ==
U.S. President George W. Bush's bullhorn address at Ground Zero in New York City on September 14, 2001

While touring the wreckage, Bush climbed atop a crumpled fire truck to be seen by the crowd of rescue workers. Because he was having difficulty being heard, retired FDNY firefighter Bob Beckwith helped steady him and a bullhorn was produced. Standing with his arm around Beckwith, Bush addressed the crowd:

Thank you all. I want you all to know—it [bullhorn] can't go any louder—I want you all to know that America today, America today is on bended knee, in prayer for the people whose lives were lost here, for the workers who work here, for the families who mourn. The nation stands with the good people of New York City and New Jersey and Connecticut as we mourn the loss of thousands of our citizens.

At this point, a worker in the crowd called out, "I can't hear you!" Bush responded:

I can hear you! I can hear you! The rest of the world hears you! And the people—and the people who knocked these buildings down will hear all of us soon!

The crowd responded with repeated chants of "U.S.A.! U.S.A.! U.S.A.!" Bush continued once the chanting subsided:

The nation—the nation sends its love and compassion to everybody who is here. Thank you for your hard work. Thank you for making the nation proud, and may God bless America.

The crowd again broke into chants of "U.S.A.!" as Bush stepped down.

The bullhorn used by Bush, a Fanon MP-5 model, was retained as an artifact and is held by the George W. Bush Presidential Library and Museum, along with photographs of the moment.

== Reception and legacy ==
The address is widely regarded as a defining moment of Bush's presidency and of the immediate national response to the September 11 attacks. Commentators have pointed to the exchange over the bullhorn's volume as a turning point in the speech, arguing that Bush's improvised response to the heckler transformed a logistically troubled appearance into a moment of national unity and resolve. Public-speaking analysts have similarly noted that the moment, though unplanned, is frequently studied as an example of effective crisis communication and audience connection.

Bush's approval ratings rose sharply in the weeks following the September 11 attacks and his visit to Ground Zero, reaching some of the highest levels recorded for a U.S. president at the time. The image of Bush atop the fire truck with Beckwith, and the phrase "I can hear you," became closely associated with the early response to the attacks and were widely reproduced in retrospectives on the anniversary of September 11 in subsequent years.
