= Enya Gonzalez =

Filipina singer

- Enya Gonzalez, from a 1940 newspaper.
- Born: February 26, 1915; Baliuag, Bulacan
- Died: December 16, 1982 (aged 67); New York
- Other names: Enya Beabout (after marriage)
- Occupation: Singer
- Years active: 1930s-1950s

Enya Gonzalez (February 26, 1915 – December 16, 1982) was an opera singer from the Philippines.

== Early life ==
Enya Gonzalez was from Baliuag, Bulacan, the daughter of Luis González and Pilar Garcia. Her father was a tenor singer. She studied at the Philippine Women's University. Her brother Edgardo González was executed as a guerrilla leader during the Japanese occupation of the Philippines.

== Career ==
Gonzalez made her New York debut in 1938, starring in Madama Butterfly with the San Carlo Opera Company, after Hizi Koyke. Later that year she toured giving concerts in the United States and Mexico, and was featured on the cover of Newsweek magazine with the tagline "Enya Gonzalez: A Cio-Cio-San from Manila". She sang at the White House for Franklin Roosevelt and Eleanor Roosevelt, sang on radio in 1939, and toured in the United States and Canada during the 1940–1941 season. She sang at the Hollywood Bowl in 1941.

During World War II, Gonzalez continued singing in concerts, and joined the USO and toured American army bases in Latin America, Greenland, and Iceland to entertain the troops. In 1944, she sang "Ave Maria" at the Washington, D.C. funeral of Manuel L. Quezon. She resumed her opera career after the war, starring in Madama Butterfly again in New York in 1946. She sang the part of the last time in 1954.

== Personal life ==
Enya Gonzalez married Wendell Beabout. They had two children, Charles and Wendy. She became an American citizen in 1949. She died in 1982, in New York. Her grave is with her husband's, in Long Island National Cemetery.
