= George Huber Wheeler =

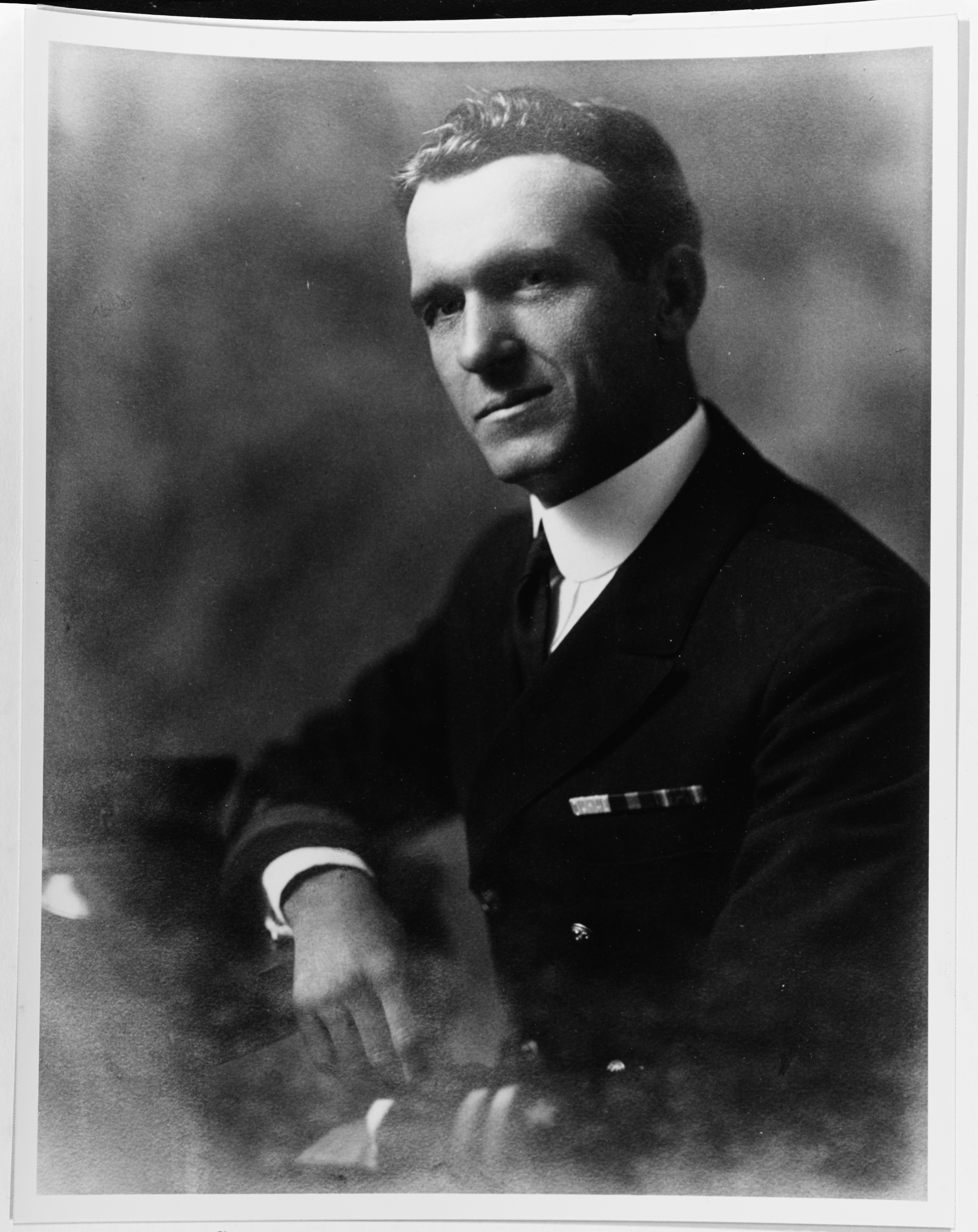
- Born: September 26, 1881; Charleston, South Carolina, US
- Died: January 20, 1957 (aged 75); Bethesda, Maryland, US
- Burial place: Arlington National Cemetery
- Military career
- Allegiance: United States
- Branch: United States Navy
- Service years: 1905–1937
- Rank: Lieutenant
- Units: USS Vermont (BB-20); USS Quail (AM-15); USS Altair (AD-11); USS Concord (CL-10); USS Oklahoma (BB-37); USS Vestal (AR-4)
- Awards: Medal of Honor

George Huber Wheeler (September 26, 1881 – January 20, 1957) was a United States Navy sailor and a recipient of the United States military's highest decoration, the Medal of Honor. He was awarded the medal for his fire-fighting efforts during a blaze in Coquimbo, Chile. Wheeler went on to have a 32-year Navy career, being temporarily promoted to lieutenant during World War I and achieving the permanent rank of chief warrant officer before his retirement.

== Biography ==
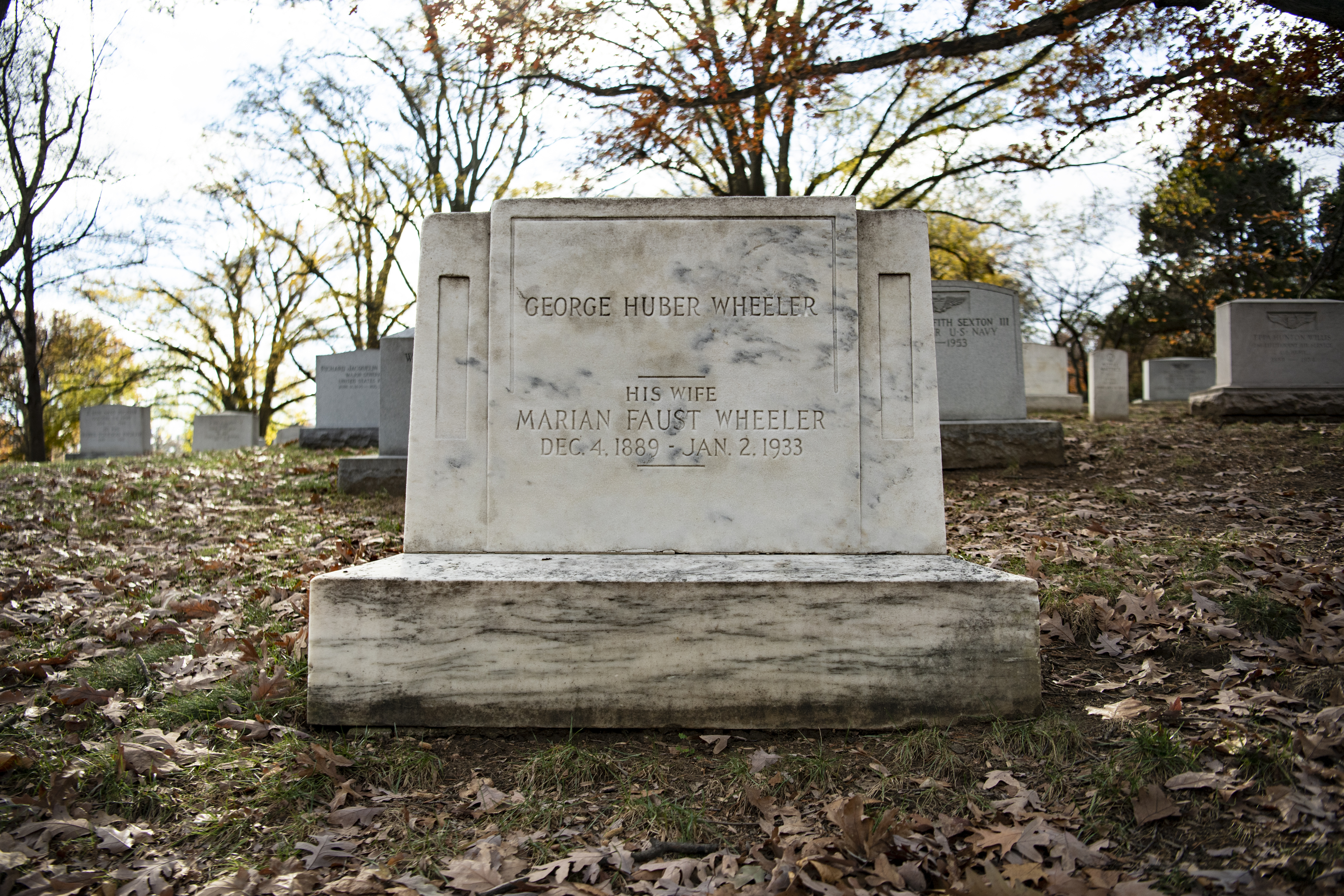
Grave at Arlington National Cemetery

Wheeler was born on September 26, 1881, in Charleston, South Carolina, and enlisted in the Navy from that state in August 1905. By January 20, 1909, he was serving as a shipfitter first class on a ship in the 2nd Division of the United States Pacific Fleet. On that evening, while the division was anchored off Coquimbo, Chile, a fire broke out at a hotel in the city. Wheeler was among a group of U.S. sailors, led by Captain Bradley A. Fiske, who went ashore and attempted to extinguish the blaze. The group was unable to save the hotel, but successfully kept the fire from spreading to nearby buildings. For their actions during the incident, Wheeler and another man, Boatswain's Mate William Henry Gowan, were awarded the Medal of Honor two months later, on March 19.

Wheeler's official Medal of Honor citation reads:

For bravery and extraordinary heroism displayed by him during a conflagration in Coquimbo, Chile, 20 January 1909.

In October 1914, Wheeler was appointed from Washington D.C. to the warrant officer rank of carpenter, serving on the battleship USS Vermont (BB-20) during the next three years. He was temporarily promoted to the commissioned officer rank of ensign in October 1917, some months after the United States entered World War I. In May 1918, he was assigned to the Washington Navy Yard, Washington, D.C., and received a temporary promotion that July to lieutenant (junior grade). A year later, he was advanced to lieutenant. In October 1920, nearly two years after the end of the war, Wheeler reverted to the warrant rank of chief carpenter and was later ordered to the Coco Solo Naval Submarine Base in the Panama Canal Zone.

Wheeler returned to sea duty in October 1922 on board the minesweeper USS Quail (AM-15) and transferred two years later to the destroyer tender USS Altair (AD-11). In August 1926, he was assigned to Naval Training Center San Diego, California, later serving in the San Diego offices of the Eleventh Naval District. Early December 1928, Wheeler began duty on board the light cruiser USS Concord (CL-10), which was followed by a shore assignment at the Philadelphia Naval Shipyard in Pennsylvania. He served from 1934 to 1937 on the battleship USS Oklahoma (BB-37) and the repair ship USS Vestal (AR-4). Transferred in June 1937 to the Naval Hospital in Portsmouth, Virginia, in November he was placed on the retired list with his earlier rank of lieutenant. Wheeler died in Bethesda, Maryland, on January 20, 1957, and is buried at Arlington National Cemetery in Arlington County, Virginia.

== See also ==
- List of Medal of Honor recipients during peacetime
