= Charles W. Shea =

United States Army Medal of Honor recipient

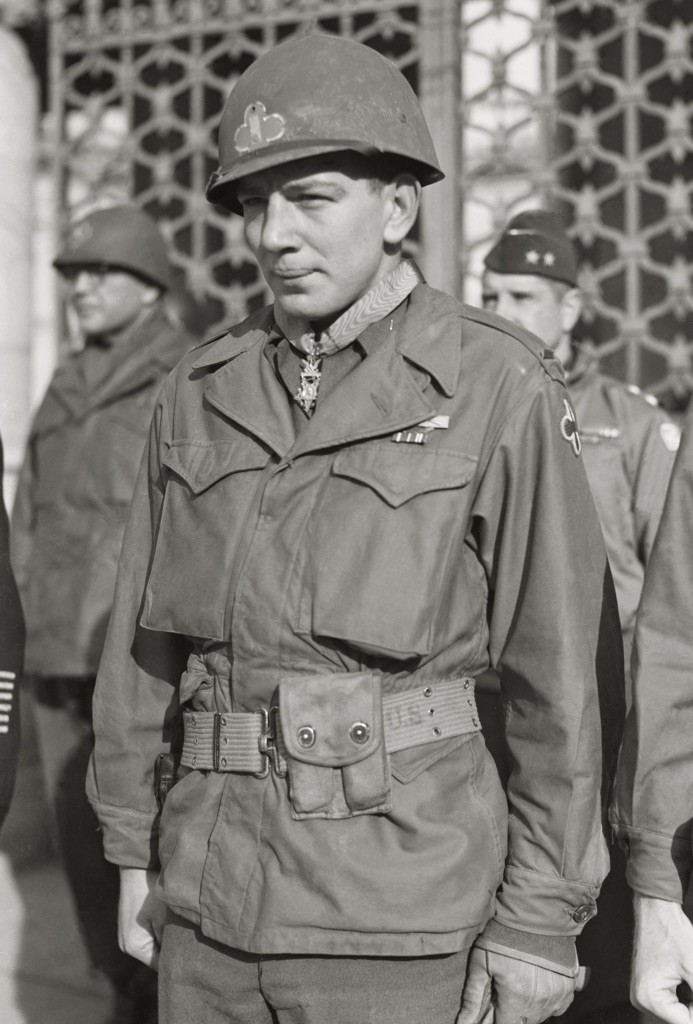
- 2nd Lt. Shea after receiving his medal
- Born: August 24, 1921; New York City, US
- Died: April 7, 1994 (aged 72); Plainview, New York, US
- Burial place: Long Island National Cemetery, Farmingdale, New York
- Military career
- Allegiance: United States of America
- Branch: United States Army
- Service years: 1942–1945, 1949–1972
- Rank: Colonel
- Units: 2nd Battalion, 350th Infantry Regiment, 88th Infantry Division
- Commands: 1st Battalion, 69th Infantry Regiment
- Conflicts: World War II
- Awards: Medal of Honor; Bronze Star Medal

Charles William Shea (August 24, 1921 – April 7, 1994) was a United States Army officer and a recipient of the United States military's highest decoration—the Medal of Honor–for his actions in World War II.

== Biography ==
Shea was raised in the Bronx, New York City. While still attending high school, he worked at Yankee Stadium selling cold drinks and peanuts. After graduation, he worked as a mechanic at a refrigeration plant.

Shea joined the Army from his birthplace of New York City in July 1942, and by May 12, 1944, he was serving as a staff sergeant in Company F, 2nd Battalion, 350th Infantry Regiment, 88th Infantry Division. On that day, near Mount Damiano, Italy, he single-handedly disabled three German machine-gun nests. Soon afterward, he received a battlefield commission as a second lieutenant. Shea was awarded the Medal of Honor eight months later, on January 12, 1945. The medal was presented to him by Lt. Gen. Mark W. Clark on January 17, 1945 during an 88th Infantry Division awards ceremony in Montecatini, Italy.

Shea remained on active duty until July 20, 1945. After the war, he worked for the New York City Division of Veterans Affairs. Shea joined the New York National Guard as a first lieutenant in 1949 and retired with the rank of colonel in 1972. As a captain, he graduated from an advanced course at the Army Infantry School in 1957. As a lieutenant colonel, he assumed command of the 1st Battalion, 69th Infantry in 1966.

Shea moved to Plainview, New York, and died at the Central General Hospital there at age 72 after suffering a heart attack. He was buried next to his wife Kathleen in Long Island National Cemetery, Farmingdale, New York, on April 11, 1994.

== Medal of Honor citation ==
Shea's official Medal of Honor citation reads:

"For conspicuous gallantry and intrepidity at risk of life above and beyond the call of duty, on 12 May 1944, near Mount Damiano, Italy. As 2d Lt. Shea and his company were advancing toward a hill occupied by the enemy, three enemy machine guns suddenly opened fire, inflicting heavy casualties upon the company and halting its advance. 2d Lt. Shea immediately moved forward to eliminate these machine-gun nests in order to enable his company to continue its attack. The deadly hail of machine-gun fire at first pinned him down, but boldly continuing his advance, 2d Lt. Shea crept up to the first nest. Throwing several hand grenades, he forced the four enemy soldiers manning this position to surrender, and disarming them, he sent them to the rear. He then crawled to the second machine-gun position, and after a short firefight forced two more German soldiers to surrender. At this time, the third machine gun fired at him, and while deadly small-arms fire pitted the earth around him, 2d Lt. Shea crawled toward the nest. Suddenly he stood up and rushed the emplacement and with well-directed fire from his rifle, he killed all three of the enemy machine gunners. Second Lt. Shea's display of personal valor was an inspiration to the officers and men of his company."

== See also ==
- List of Medal of Honor recipients
- List of Medal of Honor recipients for World War II
