= John Everetts =

John Everett U.S Navy sailor and Medal of Honor recipient

- Born: August 25, 1873; Thorold, Ontario
- Died: September 12, 1956 (aged 83)
- Military career
- Allegiance: United States
- Branch: United States Navy
- Rank: Chief Gunner's Mate
- Unit: USS Cushing
- Awards: Medal of Honor

John Everetts (August 25, 1873 – September 12, 1956) was a United States Navy sailor and a recipient of the United States military's highest decoration, the Medal of Honor.

== Biography ==
Born on August 25, 1873, in Thorold, Ontario, Everetts immigrated to the United States and was living in New York City when he joined the Navy. By February 11, 1898, he was serving as a gunner's mate third class on the USS Cushing. On that day, he and Ship's Cook First Class Daniel Atkins attempted unsuccessfully to rescue Ensign Joseph Breckinridge, who had fallen overboard. For this action, both Everetts and Atkins were awarded the Medal of Honor three months later, on May 20, 1898.

Everetts's official Medal of Honor citation reads:

Serving on board the U.S.S. Cushing, 11 February 1898, Everetts displayed gallant conduct in attempting to save the life of the late Ens. Joseph C. Breckinridge, U.S. Navy, who fell overboard at sea from that vessel.

After his medal of honor action, Everetts participated in the Spanish–American War. He reached the rank of chief petty officer before leaving the Navy.

Everetts died on September 12, 1956, at age 83. He was interred at Long Island National Cemetery.

== See also ==
- List of Medal of Honor recipients during peacetime
