= James McLurkin =

American engineer

- Education: Massachusetts Institute of Technology; University of California at Berkeley
- Known for: Inventing the world's smallest self-contained autonomous robots
- Scientific career
- Workplaces: Google, Rice University
- Thesis: Analysis and Implementation of Distributed Algorithms for Multi-Robot Systems (2008)

James McLurkin (born 1972) is a Senior Hardware Engineer at Google. Previously, he was an engineering assistant professor at Rice University specializing in swarm robotics. In 2005, he appeared on an episode of PBS' Nova and is a winner of the 2003 Lemelson-MIT Prize.

== Early life ==
McLurkin was born in 1972 in Baldwin, New York and graduated from Baldwin Senior High School in 1990. He built his first robot, Rover, in 1988.

== Education and career ==
McLurkin completed his PhD in computer science in May 2008 at the Massachusetts Institute of Technology Computer Science and Artificial Intelligence Laboratory. Previously, he earned his master's degree in electrical engineering from the University of California at Berkeley and B.S. from MIT.

As part of his doctoral research, McLurkin developed algorithms and techniques for programming "swarms" of autonomous robots to mimic the behavior of bees, including their abilities to cluster, disperse, follow, and orbit.

In 1995, McLurkin was invited by the Smithsonian Institution to speak about his life and career in a presentation for schoolchildren sponsored by the Smithsonian's Lemelson Center for the Study of Invention and Innovation.
