= Robert Von Ancken =

American businessman

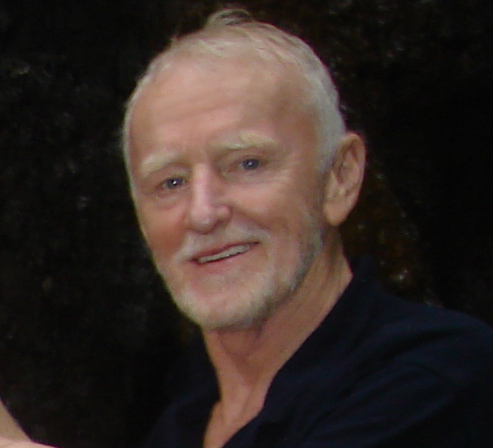
- Born: Baldwin, Nassau County, New York, United States
- Occupation: Real estate appraiser
- Known for: Appraisals of the World Trade Center, Grand Central Terminal

Robert Von Ancken is a prominent New York City real estate appraiser, who has appraised more than 8,000 properties in and around New York City, including the Empire State Building, the Chrysler Building, Rockefeller Center and Columbia University. He has testified in front of the Supreme Court to deter the construction of a building over Grand Central Terminal and establishing the value of the World Trade Center prior to the terrorist attacks on behalf of the insurance companies. He has also been referred to as one of the "nation's busiest experts on air rights", and has spoken and been quoted extensively on the topic.

Until February 2019, he was Chairman of Landauer Valuation & Advisory, a division of Newmark Grubb Knight Frank. He is currently retired.

== Background ==
Robert Von Ancken was born in Baldwin, Nassau County, New York and raised in Astoria, Queens. After a stint in the engineering program at CUNY, he received his degree from Baruch College in Real Estate and Business Administration. He attended graduate school at Baruch College with a specialization in Real Estate. He has subsequently received his MAI and CRE, and has become a member of England's Royal Institute of Chartered Surveyors.

He is the father of four children and currently resides in Briarcliff Manor, NY. He is a self-proclaimed avid sailor.
