= Joseph E. Schaefer =

United States Army soldier

- Born: December 27, 1918; Queens, New York, US
- Died: March 16, 1987 (aged 68); Richmond Hill, Queens, New York
- Burial place: Long Island National Cemetery, Farmingdale, New York
- Military career
- Allegiance: United States of America
- Branch: United States Army
- Rank: Staff Sergeant
- Units: 18th Infantry Regiment, 1st Infantry Division
- Conflicts: World War II; Korean War
- Awards: Medal of Honor

Joseph Edward Schaefer (December 27, 1918 – March 16, 1987) was a United States Army soldier and a recipient of the United States military's highest decoration, the Medal of Honor, for his actions in World War II.

Schaefer joined the Army from Long Island, New York in January 1942, and by September 24, 1944, was serving as a staff sergeant in Company I, 18th Infantry Regiment, 1st Infantry Division. On that day, near Stolberg, Germany, Schaefer led his squad in their defense against a German attack. He voluntarily took the most dangerous defensive position, killed many of the attacking soldiers, and single-handedly captured ten. He then participated in the American counter-attack and freed a group of American soldiers captured earlier. For his actions during the battle, he was awarded the Medal of Honor eleven months later, on August 22, 1945.

Schaefer later served in the Korean War. He died at age 68 and was buried at Long Island National Cemetery, Farmingdale, New York.

== Medal of Honor citation ==
Schaefer's official Medal of Honor citation reads:

He was in charge of a squad of the 2d Platoon in the vicinity of Stolberg, Germany, early in the morning of 24 September 1944, when 2 enemy companies supported by machineguns launched an attack to seize control of an important crossroads which was defended by his platoon. One American squad was forced back, another captured, leaving only SSG Schaefer's men to defend the position. To shift his squad into a house which would afford better protection, he crawled about under heavy small-arms and machinegun fire, instructed each individual, and moved to the building. A heavy concentration of enemy artillery fire scored hits on his strong point. S/Sgt. Schaefer assigned his men to positions and selected for himself the most dangerous one at the door. With his M1 rifle, he broke the first wave of infantry thrown toward the house. The Germans attacked again with grenades and flame throwers but were thrown back a second time, S/Sgt. Schaefer killing and wounding several. Regrouped for a final assault, the Germans approached from 2 directions. One force drove at the house from the front, while a second group advanced stealthily along a hedgerow. Recognizing the threat, S/Sgt. Schaefer fired rapidly at the enemy before him, killing or wounding all 6; then, with no cover whatever, dashed to the hedgerow and poured deadly accurate shots into the second group, killing 5, wounding 2 others, and forcing the enemy to withdraw. He scoured the area near his battered stronghold and captured 10 prisoners. By this time the rest of his company had begun a counterattack; he moved forward to assist another platoon to regain its position. Remaining in the lead, crawling and running in the face of heavy fire, he overtook the enemy, and liberated the American squad captured earlier in the battle. In all, single-handed and armed only with his rifle, he killed between 15 and 20 Germans, wounded at least as many more, and took 10 prisoners. S/Sgt. Schaefer's indomitable courage and his determination to hold his position at all costs were responsible for stopping an enemy break-through.

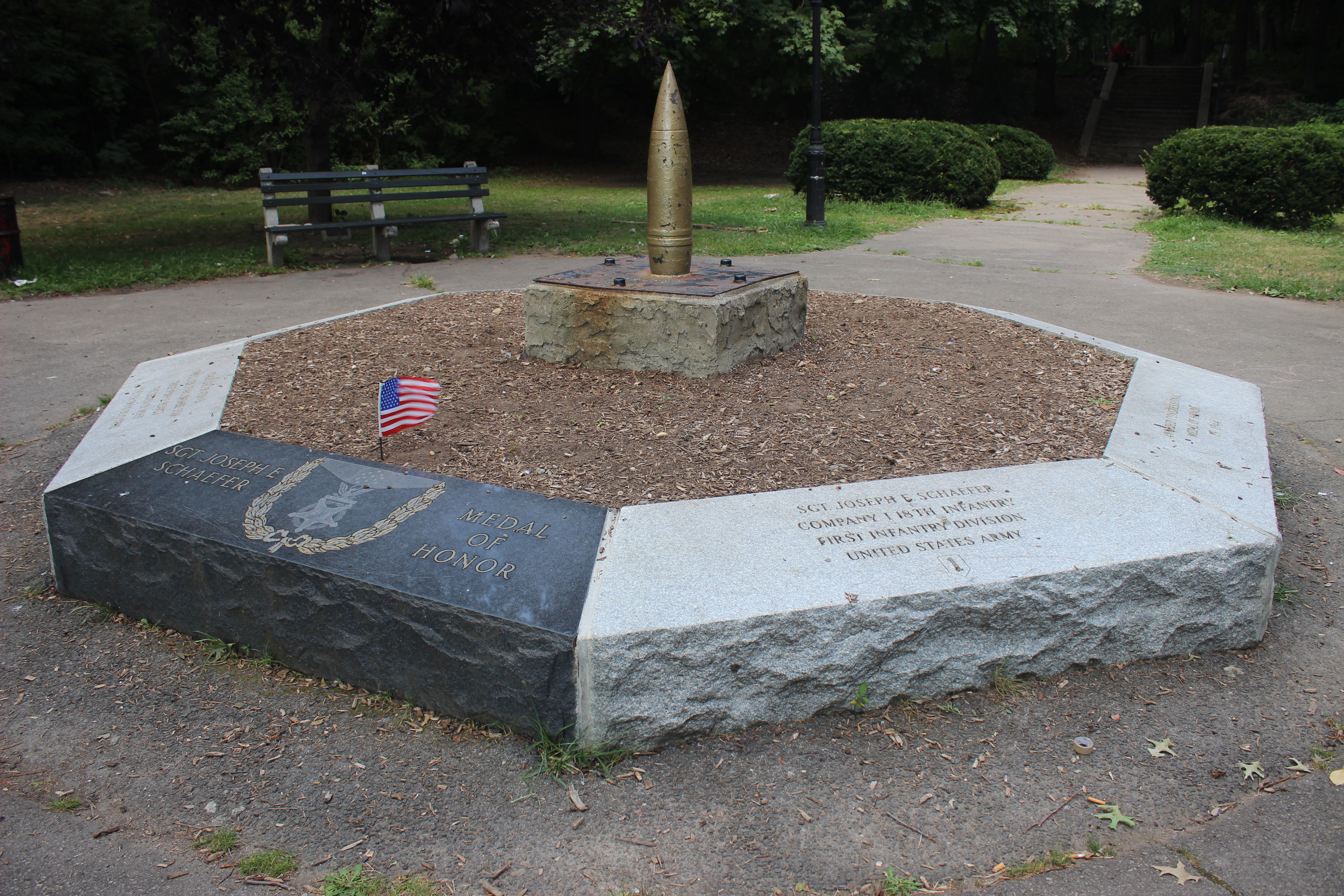
Medal Of Honor Memorial. Srgt Joseph E. Schaefer. Located in Forest Park, Queens, New York.

== See also ==
- List of Medal of Honor recipients
- List of Medal of Honor recipients for World War II
