= Heinrich Behnke (Medal of Honor) =

- Born: April 10, 1882; Germany
- Died: June 19, 1952 (aged 70)
- Burial place: Long Island National Cemetery, Farmingdale, New York
- Military career
- Allegiance: United States of America
- Branch: United States Navy
- Service years: 1902 - 1925
- Rank: Chief Watertender
- Unit: USS Iowa (BB-4)
- Awards: Medal of Honor

Heinrich Behnke (April 10, 1882 – June 19, 1952) was a seaman first class serving in the United States Navy who received the Medal of Honor for bravery.

== Biography ==
Behnke was born April 10, 1882, in Germany and after immigrating to the United States he joined the navy in 1902. He was stationed aboard the USS Iowa (BB-4) as a seaman first class when, on January 25, 1905, a manhole plate blew out of boiler D. For his actions, received the Medal of Honor March 20, 1905.

He died June 19, 1952.

== Medal of Honor citation ==
Rank and organization: Seaman First Class, U.S. Navy. Born: 10 April 1882, Germany. Accredited to: Washington, D.C. G.O. No.: 182, 20 March 1905.

Citation:

While serving aboard the U.S.S. Iowa, Behnke displayed extraordinary heroism at the time of the blowing out of the manhole plate of boiler D on board that vessel, 25 January 1905.

== See also ==
- List of Medal of Honor recipients in non-combat incidents
