= Baldwin (hamlet), New York =

Settlement in New York

Baldwin, New York
- Hamlet and census-designated place
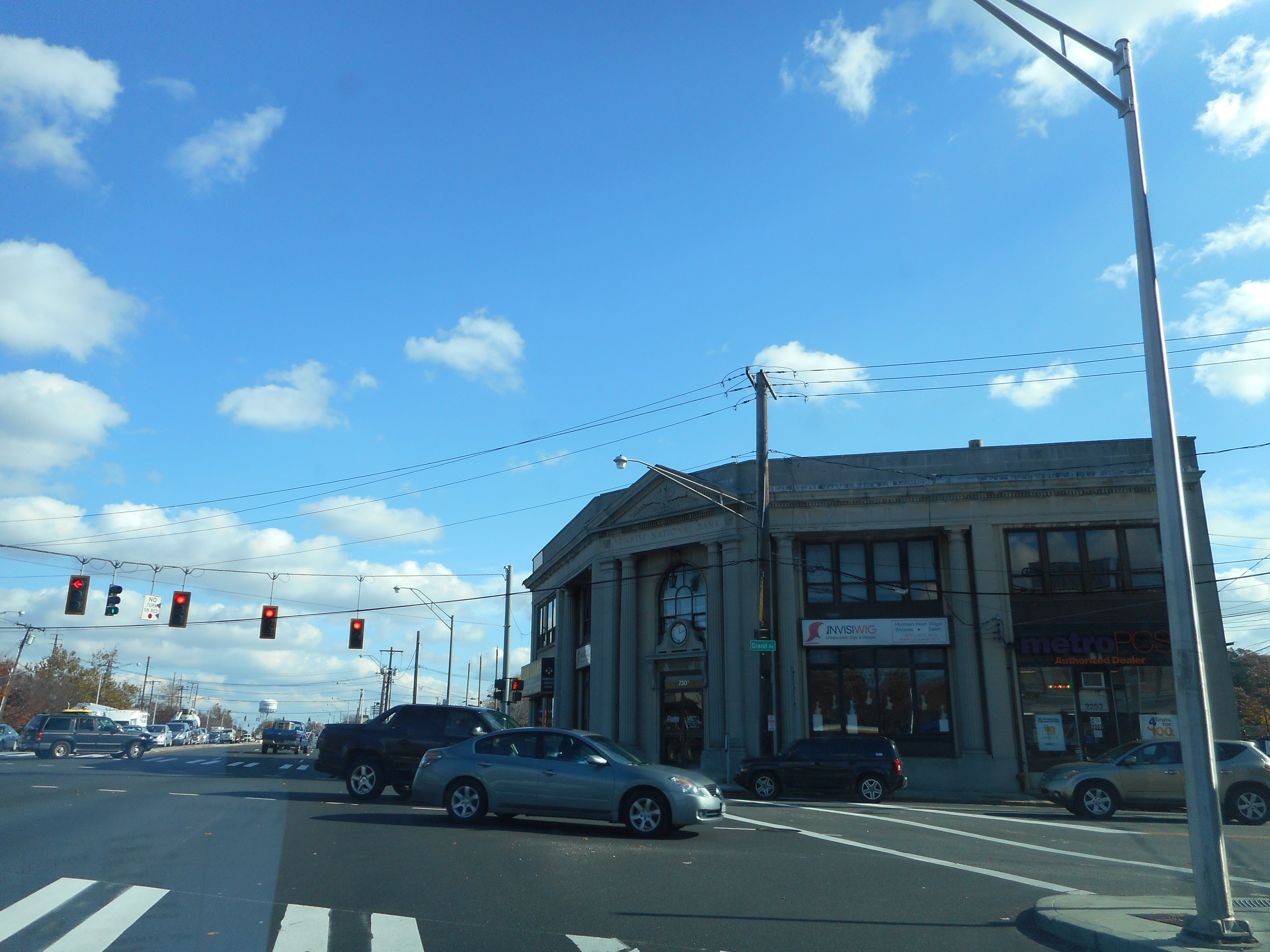
- The Sunrise National Bank Building in Baldwin

- Location in Nassau County and the state of New York

- Location within New York
- Coordinates: 40°40′12.8″N 73°36′45″W
- Country: United States
- State: New York
- County: Nassau
- Town: Hempstead
- Established: 1855
- Elevation: 23.000 ft (7.0104 m)

Population (2010)
  - Total: 24,033
- Time zone: UTC-5 (Eastern (EST))
  - Summer (DST): UTC-4 (EDT)
- ZIP Codes: 11510 (Baldwin); 11570 (Rockville Centre); 11575 (Roosevelt)
- Area code: 516
- GNIS feature ID: 942888
- Website: baldwinchamber.com

Baldwin is a hamlet located in the Town of Hempstead in Nassau County, in Long Island, New York, United States. It had a population of 33,919 in 2020.

== History ==
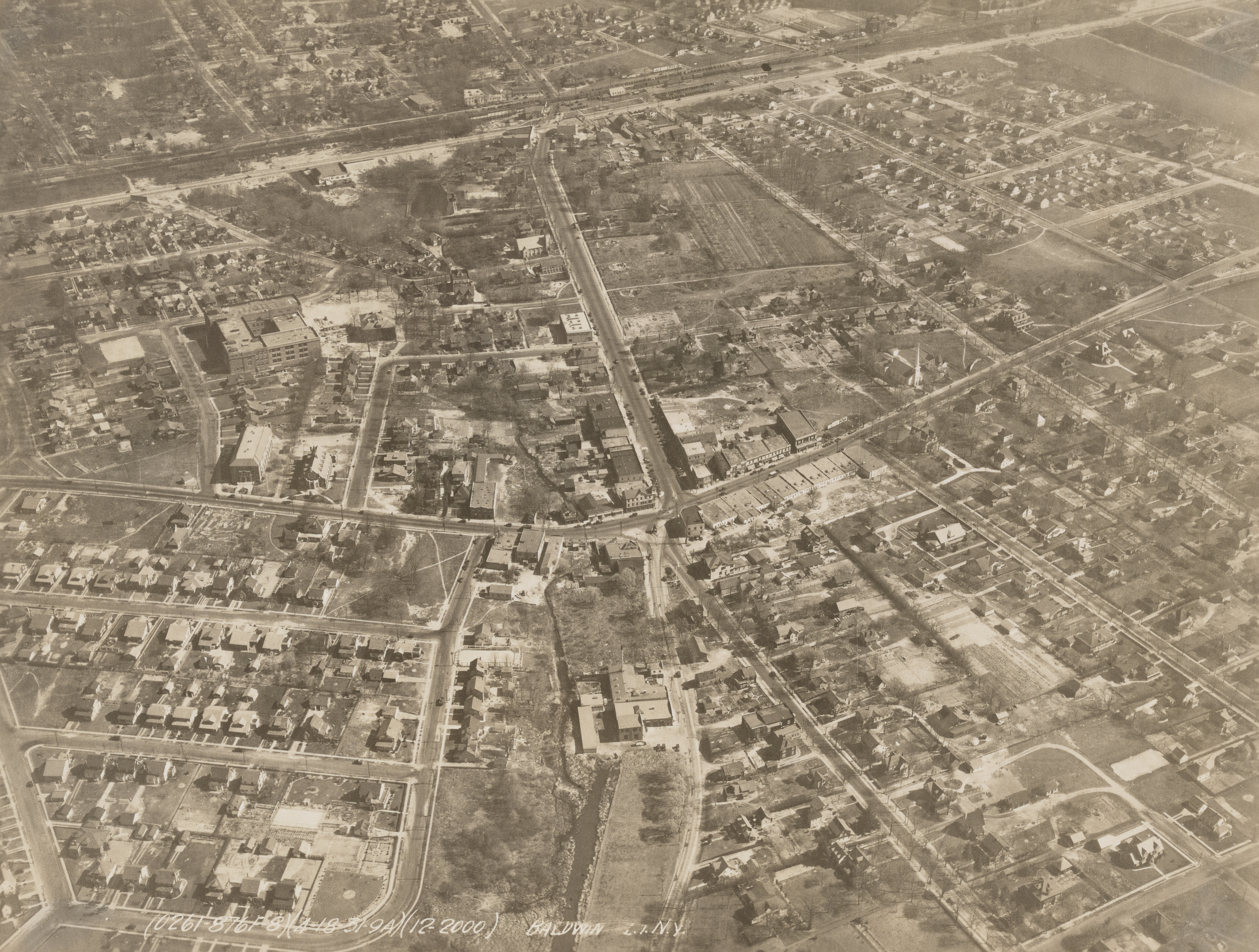
Baldwin in 1931

The original inhabitants of this area between Parsonage Creek near Oceanside and Milburn Creek near Freeport were Native Americans known as the Meroke, or Merrick, a band of Lenape people who were indigenous to most of the South Shore of Long Island. They spoke an Algonquian language and lived in two villages along Milburn Creek.

In 1643, English colonists began to call this area Hick's Neck, after one of two of Hempstead's early settlers, John Spragg from England and John Hicks from Flushing, New York. They extended the Hempstead village south to the salt meadows. The grist mill built by John Pine in 1686 on Milburn Creek attracted more English settlers. They engaged in fishing, farming, marshing, raising longwood, and breeding and raising sheep. Between the American Revolutionary War and the War of 1812, Hick's Neck continued to grow, becoming a prosperous agricultural area.

The first churches were built in the area in 1810 and 1872, and the first school was built in 1813.

Sometime around the early 19th century Hick's Neck began to be called Milburn. The first documented use of the name Milburn was in 1839. In 1855, the village was officially founded as Baldwinsville, named in honor of Thomas Baldwin (1795–1872), a sixth-generation member of the Baldwin family of Hempstead and the leading merchant of Milburn at the time. Baldwin owned a general store named T. Baldwin and Sons. He also had a hotel at what would now be considered the northwest corner of Merrick Road and Grand Avenue.

In 1867, the South Side Railroad began operating at a station in Baldwinsville. In 1870, one of Thomas Baldwin's sons, Francis Baldwin, became a member of the New York State Assembly representing Queens County's 2nd District; he later served as the Queens County treasurer. During this time, Baldwinsville was part of Queens County. A year later, the name of the village was changed from Baldwinsville to Baldwins by the U.S. Postal Service so as to not confuse it with the village of Baldwinsville in upstate New York. By 1892, by an act of local government, the village was officially named Baldwin.

Shortly after Hempstead separated from Queens County in 1899, people began to move to "Beautiful Baldwin", as it was called by Charles Luerssen, a village realtor. The village had boating (sailboats), bathing, and fishing. By 1939, ten years after the opening of Sunrise Highway, Baldwin became the largest unincorporated village in New York State—a title that was lost to Levittown by 1960.

In the 1990 US Census, the area south of Atlantic Avenue was designated as Baldwin Harbor, a hamlet and census-designated place. Baldwin Harbor remains a part of Baldwin's ZIP code, school district, and library system.

In May 1910, a breakthrough in American aviation history was made in Baldwin. The first all-American monoplane was designed, built, and successfully flown at this location by brothers Arthur and Albert Heinrich. The project was developed at the site now occupied by the Plaza Elementary School on Seaman Avenue and Rockville Drive. In the plane's initial and subsequent models, its unique designs featured controls that were combined into one stick, which allowed the pilot to fly the plane using one hand.

== Geography ==
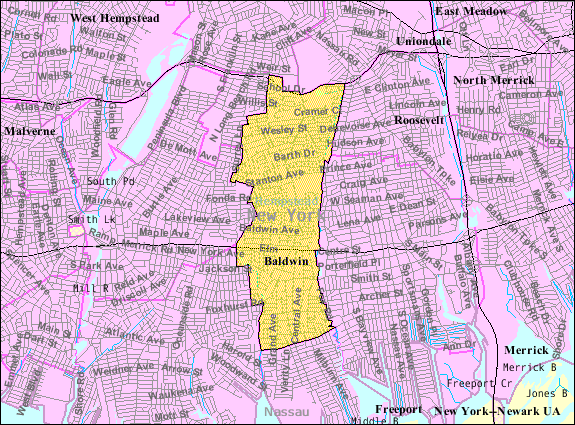
U.S. Census map

The community is located in the southwestern section of Nassau County, on Long Island's South Shore of Long Island.

According to the United States Census Bureau, the hamlet has a total area of 3.0 square miles (7.8 km^{2}), of which 0.34% is water.

=== Climate ===
The climate is borderline between a hot summer humid continental climate (Dfa) and a humid subtropical climate (Cfa). Average monthly temperatures in the village center range from 31.9 °F in January to 74.8 °F in July. The local hardiness zone is 7b.

== Demographics ==
There were 1,200 people in the community of Baldwin in 1882, 1,500 in 1890, 5,000 in 1920, 12,000 in 1930, 15,000 in 1940, and 31,630 in 1980.

=== Racial and ethnic composition ===
Baldwin CDP, New York – Racial and ethnic composition Note: the US Census treats Hispanic/Latino as an ethnic category. This table excludes Latinos from the racial categories and assigns them to a separate category. Hispanics/Latinos may be of any race.
Race / Ethnicity (NH = Non-Hispanic)	Pop 2000	Pop 2010	Pop 2020	% 2000	% 2010	% 2020
White alone (NH)	14,143	9,555	9,831	60.30%	39.76%	28.98%
Black or African American alone (NH)	5,226	7,886	12,989	22.28%	32.81%	38.29%
Native American or Alaska Native alone (NH)	43	47	55	0.18%	0.20%	0.16%
Asian alone (NH)	761	979	1,576	3.24%	4.07%	4.65%
Native Hawaiian or Pacific Islander alone (NH)	3	5	8	0.01%	0.02%	0.02%
Other race alone (NH)	96	177	535	0.41%	0.74%	1.58%
Mixed race or Multiracial (NH)	462	522	1,337	1.97%	2.17%	3.94%
Hispanic or Latino (any race)	2,721	4,862	7,588	11.60%	20.23%	22.37%
Total	23,455	24,033	33,919	100.00%	100.00%	100.00%

=== 2000 Census ===
As of the census of 2000, there were 23,455 people, 7,868 households, and 6,081 families residing in the village. The population density was 7,954.4 inhabitants per square mile (3,071.2/km^{2}). There were 7,999 housing units at an average density of 2,712.8 per square mile (1,047.4/km^{2}). The racial makeup of the CDP was 67.3% White, 17.9% African American, 10.6% Hispanic or Latino, 1.1% Asian, 0.8% Native American, 0.3% Pacific Islander, 4.60% from other races, and 3.03% from two or more races.

There were 7,868 households, out of which 38.3% had children under the age of 18 living with them, 61.0% were married couples living together, 12.7% had a female householder with no husband present, and 22.7% were non-families. Of all households, 18.5% were made up of individuals, and 9.3% had someone living alone who was 65 years of age or older. The average household size was 2.98 and the average family size was 3.40.

In the community, the population was spread out, with 26.1% under the age of 18, 7.2% from 18 to 24, 30.5% from 25 to 44, 24.1% from 45 to 64, and 12.0% who were 65 years of age or older. The median age was 37 years. For every 100 females, there were 89.9 males. For every 100 females age 18 and over, there were 85.2 males.

The median income for a household in the community was $71,456, and the median income for a family was $78,400. Males had a median income of $51,069 versus $40,496 for females. The per capita income for the CDP was $28,114. About 3.3% of families and 5.4% of the population were below the poverty line, including 5.5% of those under the age of 18, and 7.1% of those aged 65 or over.

== Parks and recreation ==
Baldwin is home to many public parks, including Coes Neck Park, Lofts Pond Park, Milburn Pond Park, and Silver Lake Park (which is also in Oceanside).

== Education ==
=== Schools ===
==== Public ====
Baldwin is served primarily by the Baldwin Union Free School District. However, small parts are also served by the Oceanside UFSD, Rockville Centre UFSD, Roosevelt UFSD, and Uniondale UFSD. Additionally, a portion of the Freeport UFSD crosses into the hamlet, but the area only includes Milburn Pond Park. Children who reside within Baldwin and attend public schools go to school in one of these districts depending on where in the hamlet they live. The names of the schools are Lenox Elementary, Plaza Elementary, Meadow Elementary, Brookside Elementary, Steele Elementary, Baldwin Middle School, and Baldwin High School.

==== Private ====
Baldwin was also home to one Catholic school: St. Christopher's. The school closed on July 24, 2021.

=== Library district ===
Baldwin is located within the boundaries of the Baldwin, Freeport, Oceanside, Rockville Centre, Roosevelt, and Uniondale Library Districts. The borders of each district within the hamlet roughly correspond with those of each school district.

== Infrastructure ==
=== Transportation ===
==== Rail ====
The Baldwin Long Island Railroad station is located in the hamlet. It is on the LIRR's Babylon Branch.

==== Road ====
Major roads which pass through the hamlet include:

- Merrick Road (Nassau County Route 27)
- Sunrise Highway (New York State Route 27)

=== Utilities ===
==== Natural gas ====
National Grid USA provides natural gas to homes and businesses that are hooked up to natural gas lines in Baldwin.

==== Power ====
PSEG Long Island provides power to all homes and businesses within Baldwin.

== Notable people ==
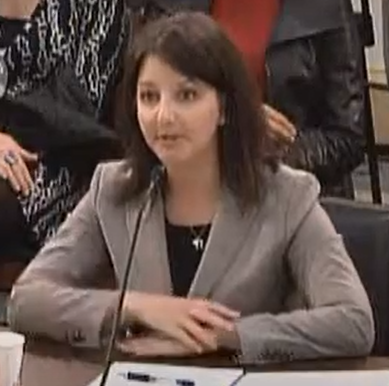
Mandy Cohen

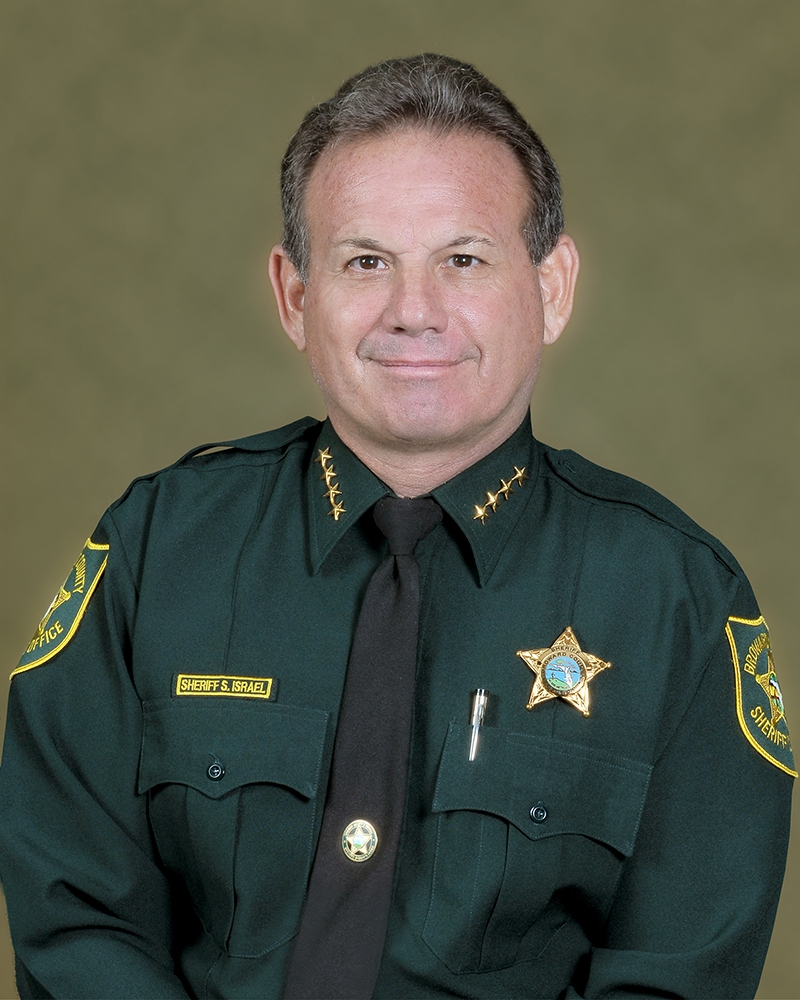
Scott Israel

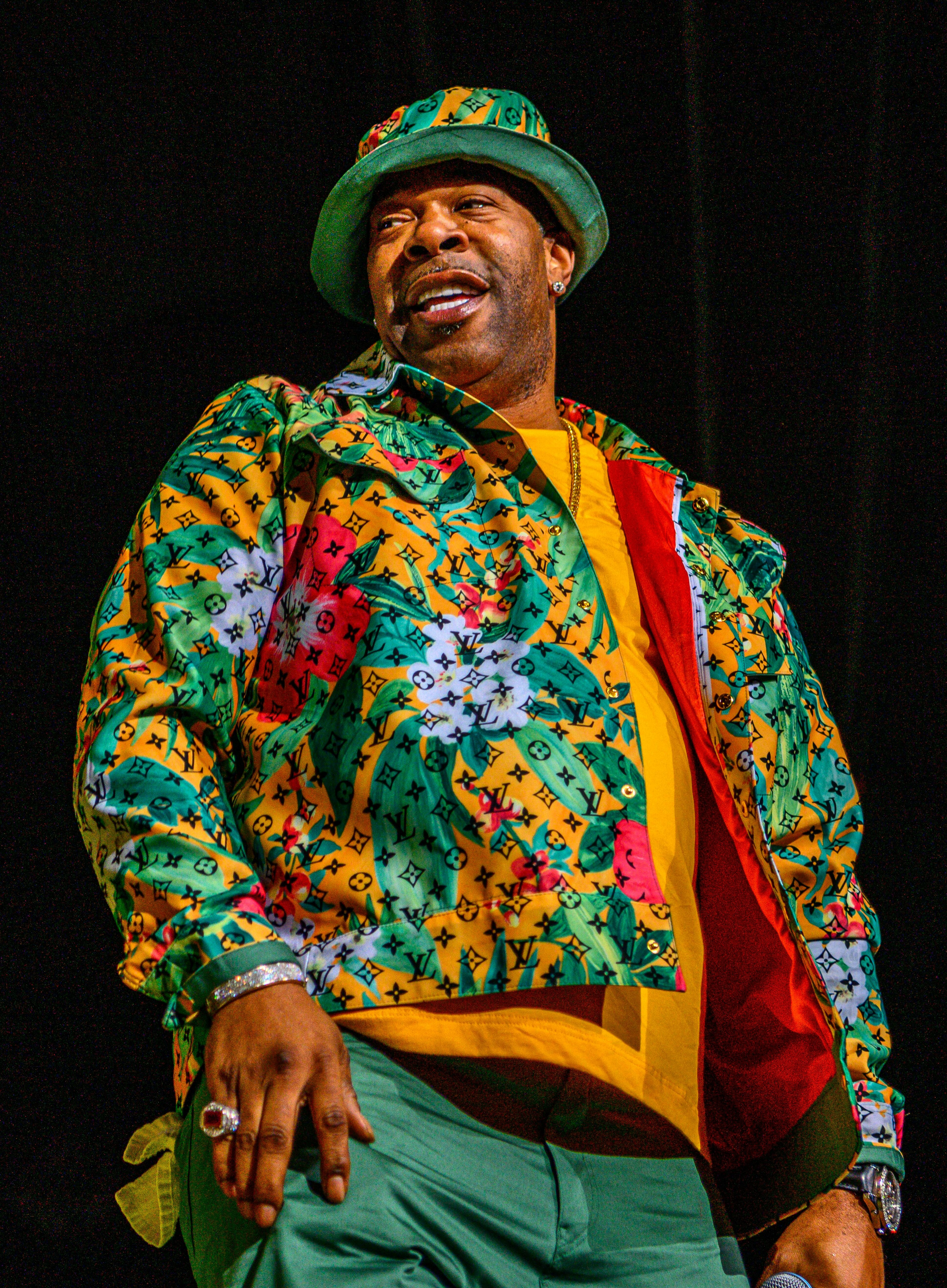
Busta Rhymes

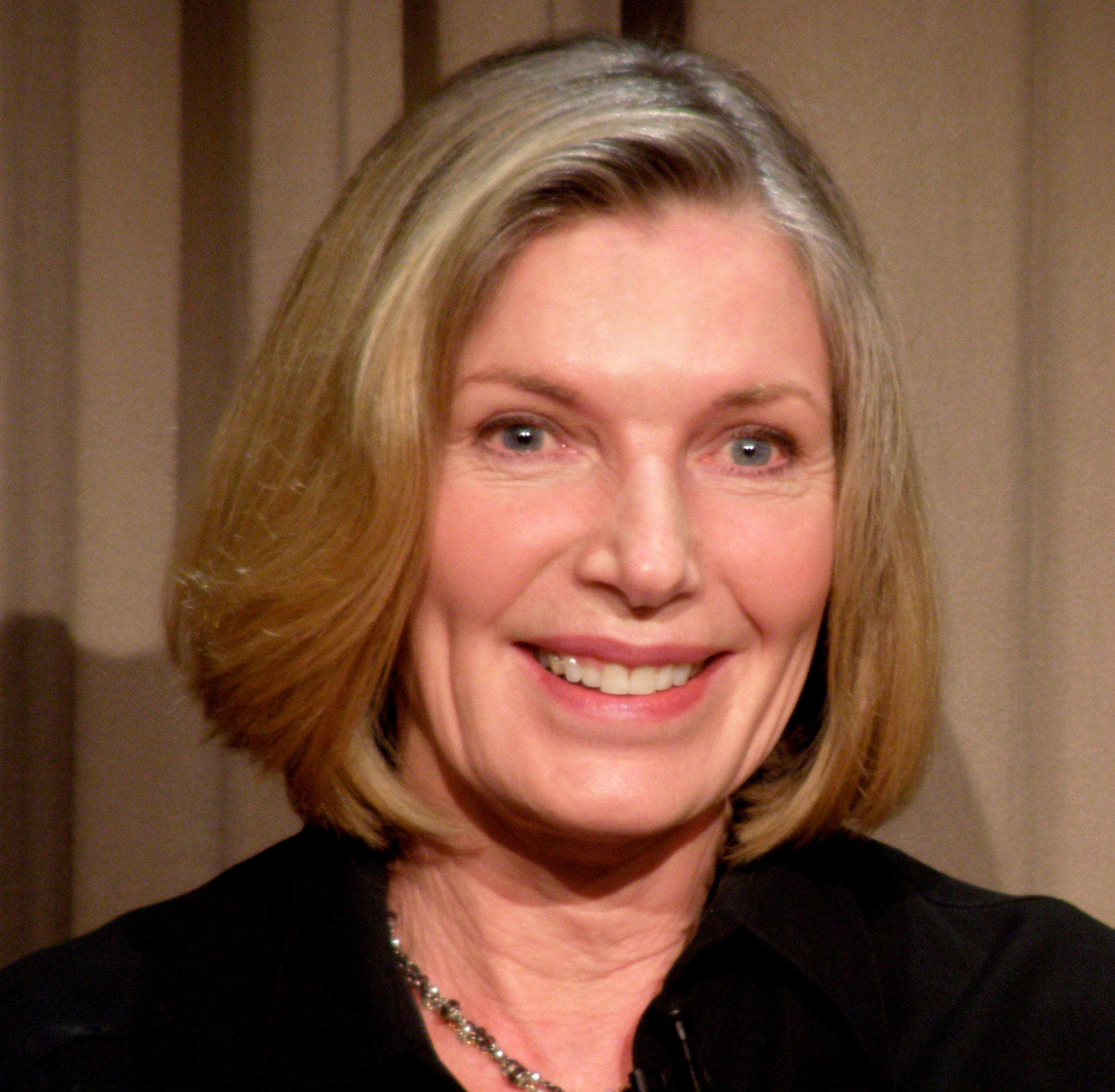
Susan Sullivan

- Bob Beckwith, FDNY veteran, stood next to President George W. Bush during a speech at the World Trade Center after 9/11
- Granville Carter, sculptor of numerous monuments in the United States and worldwide
- Danny Cepero, soccer player and coach
- Mandy Cohen, physician and Director of the U.S. Centers for Disease Control and Prevention
- Taylor Dayne, singer who has seven Billboard Top Ten hits: also known as Leslie Wunderman (Baldwin class of 1980)
- Jonathan Demme, Oscar-winning director, Silence of the Lambs
- Robert Earle, host of the G.E. College Bowl on CBS and NBC, and media lecturer at Ithaca College
- Alice Feiring, author and award-winning wine writer
- Maida Heatter (1916–2019), pastry chef and cookbook author
- Gabby Hayes, radio, film, and television actor
- Denis Reagan Hurley, federal judge (1991–2006) for the United States District Court for the Eastern District of New York
- Scott Israel, former sheriff of Broward County, Florida, current police chief of Opa-locka, Florida
- Melanie Martinez, singer/songwriter known for her albums Cry Baby and K-12. Appeared on singing reality competition “The Voice” on NBC. (Baldwin class of 2013)
- James McLurkin, professor of Robotics and Electrical Engineering at Rice University. Earned SB (EE) and PhD (CS) at MIT, MS (EE) UC Berkeley (Baldwin class of 1990)
- Busta Rhymes, rap artist
- Jeff Rosenstock, punk musician; member of Bomb the Music Industry!, The Bruce Lee Band, Kudrow, Antarctigo Vespucci, and The Arrogant Sons of Bitches
- Scott Rudin, film producer and theatrical producer; in 2012, became one of the few people who have won an Emmy, Grammy, Oscar and Tony Award, and the first producer to do so (Baldwin class of 1976)
- Bob Sheppard, long-time announcer for the New York Yankees and formerly, the New York Giants; he is honored as a Yankee Stadium legend
- Elix Skipper, retired professional wrestler
- Moneta Sleet Jr., civil rights era photographer for Ebony magazine and first African-American man to win the Pulitzer Prize in photojournalism
- Dee Snider, singer-songwriter, screenwriter, radio personality, and actor; most famous for his role as the front man of the heavy metal band Twisted Sister (Baldwin class of 1973)
- Jake Steinfeld (born 1958), actor, fitness personality, entrepreneur, and producer
- Susan Sullivan, actress known for Falcon Crest and Dharma & Greg
- Frank Tinney, vaudeville and Broadway comedian
- Jack Tramiel, founder of Commodore International
- Chris Weidman, NY state wrestling champion; two-time D-1 All-American wrestler at Hofstra; professional mixed martial artist; former UFC Middleweight Champion (Baldwin class of 2002)
- Martha Wash, singer-songwriter, actress, and producer
- Rob Weiss, director/producer Amongst Friends, Entourage
- Irad Young (born 1971), American-Israeli soccer player
- Jasmin Moghbeli A U.S. Marine Corps test pilot and NASA astronaut. ( Baldwin Senior High class of 2001 )

The soldiers who were posthumously awarded the Medal of Honor:

First Lieutenant Bernard J. Ray deliberately gave his life to spare his men of Company F, 8th Infantry, 4th Infantry Division on November 17, 1944, in the Hurtgen Forest.

Specialist Five John J. Kedenburg (BHS '64) was serving with a long-range reconnaissance team of South Vietnamese irregular troops while a member of the U.S. Army 5th Special Forces Group (Airborne). When his group came under attack and was encircled by a battalion-size North Vietnamese Army force, Kedenberg conducted a rear-guard action which allowed his group to break out of their encirclement and move to a landing zone. While in the landing zone, Kedenberg directed the defense of the L-Z and ultimately gave up the last chance of evacuation to one of his Vietnamese comrades.
