= Helen Grace McClelland =

American army nurse (1887–1984)

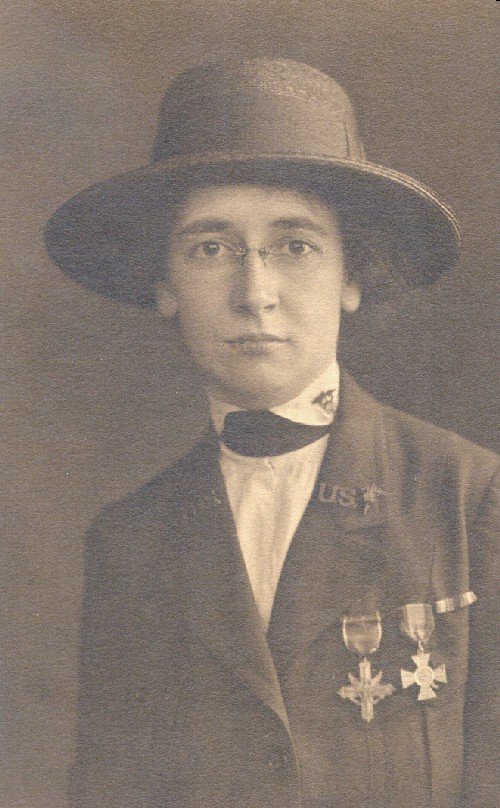
- United States Army Nursing Corp World War I, 1919
- Born: July 25, 1887; Austinburg, Ohio
- Died: December 20, 1984 (aged 97); Fredericktown, Ohio
- Education: Pennsylvania Hospital's School of Nursing
- Occupation: Nurse
- Military career
- Allegiance: United States of America
- Branch: United States Army
- Service years: 1915—1919
- Awards: Distinguished Service Cross; Distinguished Service Medal; British Royal Red Cross

Helen Grace McClelland (July 25, 1887 – December 20, 1984), a United States Army nurse, was awarded the United States Distinguished Service Cross and the British Royal Red Cross Medal (First Class) for heroic actions during World War I while serving at a British Base Hospital in France. McClelland was one of only four women to receive the Distinguished Service Cross award during World War I. After returning to the United States, McClelland spent twenty-three years as Director of Pennsylvania Hospital's School of Nursing. In her role, McClelland advocated for the professionalization and modernization of nursing. McClelland was inducted into the Ohio Women's Hall of Fame in 1978.

== Early life and education ==
Helen Grace McClelland was born on July 25, 1887, in Austinburg, Ohio. McClelland was the middle child in the family with two older sisters, Mary and Florence, and two younger brothers, Raymond and Stewart. She moved with her father, Raymond McClelland, a pastor, and her mother, Harriett (Cooper) McClelland, and her four siblings to Fredericktown, Ohio, in 1897.

McClelland enrolled in Pennsylvania Hospital's School of Nursing in 1908 and graduated in 1912. After graduation, she relocated to Weiser, Idaho to take a position as head nurse. In 1913, she moved to Norfolk, Virginia to take a job at Norfolk Protestant Hospital.

== World War I ==
McClelland joined the American Ambulance Service in France in 1915.

During World War I, McClelland joined the United States Army Nurse Corps and was assigned to British Casualty Clearing Station Number 61 near the border between Belgium and France as a surgical nurse. During an air raid bombing in August 1917, McClelland cared for injured nurse Beatrice Mary MacDonald, who lost the sight in her right eye. McClelland was awarded the Distinguished Service Cross, a citation from General Sir Douglas Haig, and the Royal Red Cross First Class from Britain for her heroic actions during World War One. She was also awarded the Distinguished Service Medal.

McClelland left the Army Nurse Corps. May 25, 1919, as one of the most decorated women during World War I.

=== Distinguished Service Cross ===
The President of the United States of America, authorized by Act of Congress, July 9, 1918, takes pleasure in presenting the Distinguished Service Cross to Reserve Nurse Helen Grace McClelland, United States Army, for extraordinary heroism in action while serving with Nurse Corps, A.E.F. (Attached), while on duty with the surgical team at British Casualty Clearing Station No. 61, British area, France, 17 August 1917. Nurse McClelland occupied the same tent with Miss Beatrice MacDonald, another reserve nurse, cared for her when wounded, stopped the hemorrhage from her wounds under fire caused by bombs from German aeroplanes.

== Pennsylvania Hospital ==
McClelland returned to Pennsylvania Hospital in 1926 as assistant to the head of the school of nursing. In 1933, McClelland took the position of head of the Pennsylvania Hospital's Nursing Department. She obtained national accreditation for the hospital's nursing education program. She designed training programs for nurses two-year training program for bedside nurse, and a four-year program to train nurses for management positions. Stacy Peeples, lead historian and curator at Pennsylvania Hospital, said, “Helen Grace McClelland perhaps more than any other single person, shaped the nursing school and nursing services at Pennsylvania Hospital.” McClelland retired in 1956.

== Other contributions to nursing ==
At the onset of World War II, McClelland assisted with the planning and operational organization of the nursing services of the 52nd Evacuation Hospital. She recruited 43 nurses, many from Pennsylvania Hospital, to serve at this Evacuation Hospital in New Caledonia.

== Later life, death and legacy ==
In 1978, McClelland was inducted into the Ohio Women's Hall of Fame.

McClelland died on December 20, 1984, in Fredericktown, Ohio, and was buried in Wayne Baptist cemetery.

Awards named for McClelland to honor her include: The Helen McClelland Award for Research and Innovation, and The Helen McClelland Award for Clinical Scholarship.
