= USS Cushing (TB-1) =

Torpedo boat of the United States Navy

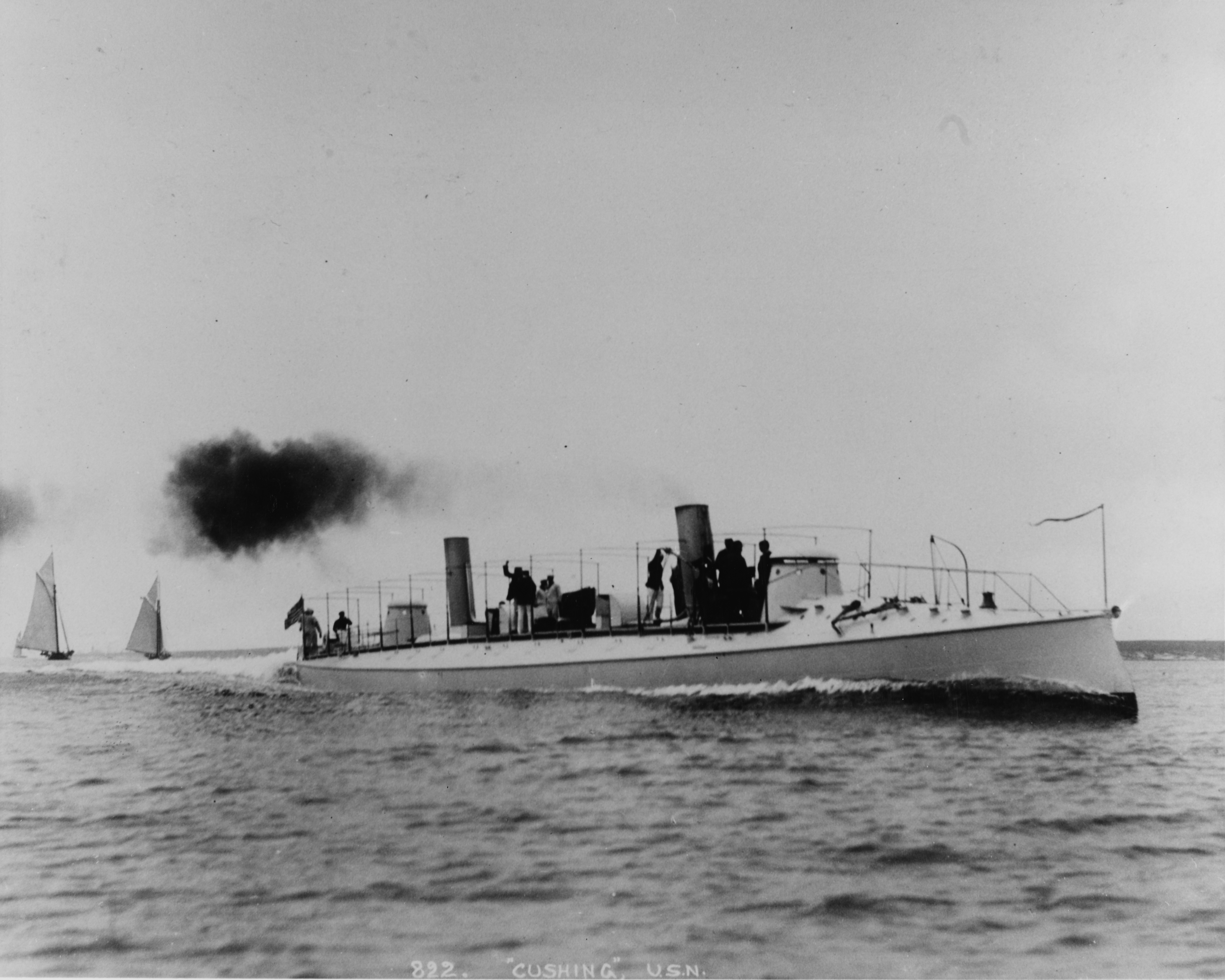
- USS Cushing (TB-1), underway during the 1890s.

History

United States
- Name: Cushing
- Namesake: Commander William B. Cushing
- Ordered: 3 August 1886 (authorised)
- Builder: Herreshoff Manufacturing Company, Bristol, Rhode Island
- Laid down: April 1888
- Launched: 23 January 1890
- Sponsored by: Miss K. B. Herreshoff
- Commissioned: 22 April 1890
- Decommissioned: 11 November 1891
- Recommissioned: 11 January 1892
- Decommissioned: 8 November 1898
- Identification: TB-1
- Fate: Sunk as target 24 September 1920

General characteristics
- Class & type: Cushing-class torpedo boat
- Displacement: 105 long tons (107 t)
- Length: 140 ft (43 m)
- Beam: 15 ft 1 in (4.60 m)
- Draft: 4 ft 10 in (1.47 m) (mean)
- Installed power: 2 × Thornycroft boilers; 1,600 ihp (1,200 kW)
- Propulsion: 2 × vertical quadruple-expansion reciprocating steam engines; 2 × screw propellers
- Speed: 23 kn (26 mph; 43 km/h); 22.5 kn (25.9 mph; 41.7 km/h) (Speed on Trial)
- Complement: 22 officers and enlisted
- Armament: 3 × 6-pounder (57 mm (2.24 in)) guns; 3 × 18 inch (450 mm) torpedo tubes (3x1)

USS Cushing (Torpedo Boat #1/TB-1) was a torpedo boat in the United States Navy during the Spanish–American War. She was named for William B. Cushing.

Cushing was launched on 23 January 1890 by the Herreshoff Manufacturing Company, Bristol, Rhode Island; sponsored by Miss K. B. Herreshoff; and commissioned on 22 April 1890, Lieutenant C. M. Winslow in command.

== Service history ==
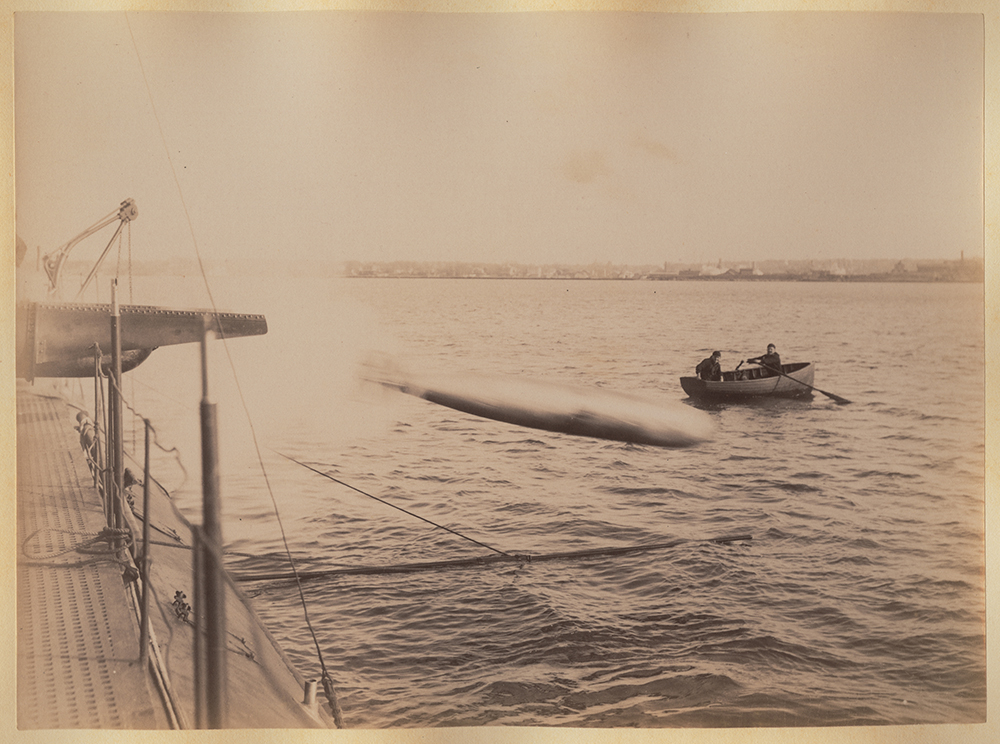
USS Cushing torpedo boat experiments, ca. 1890

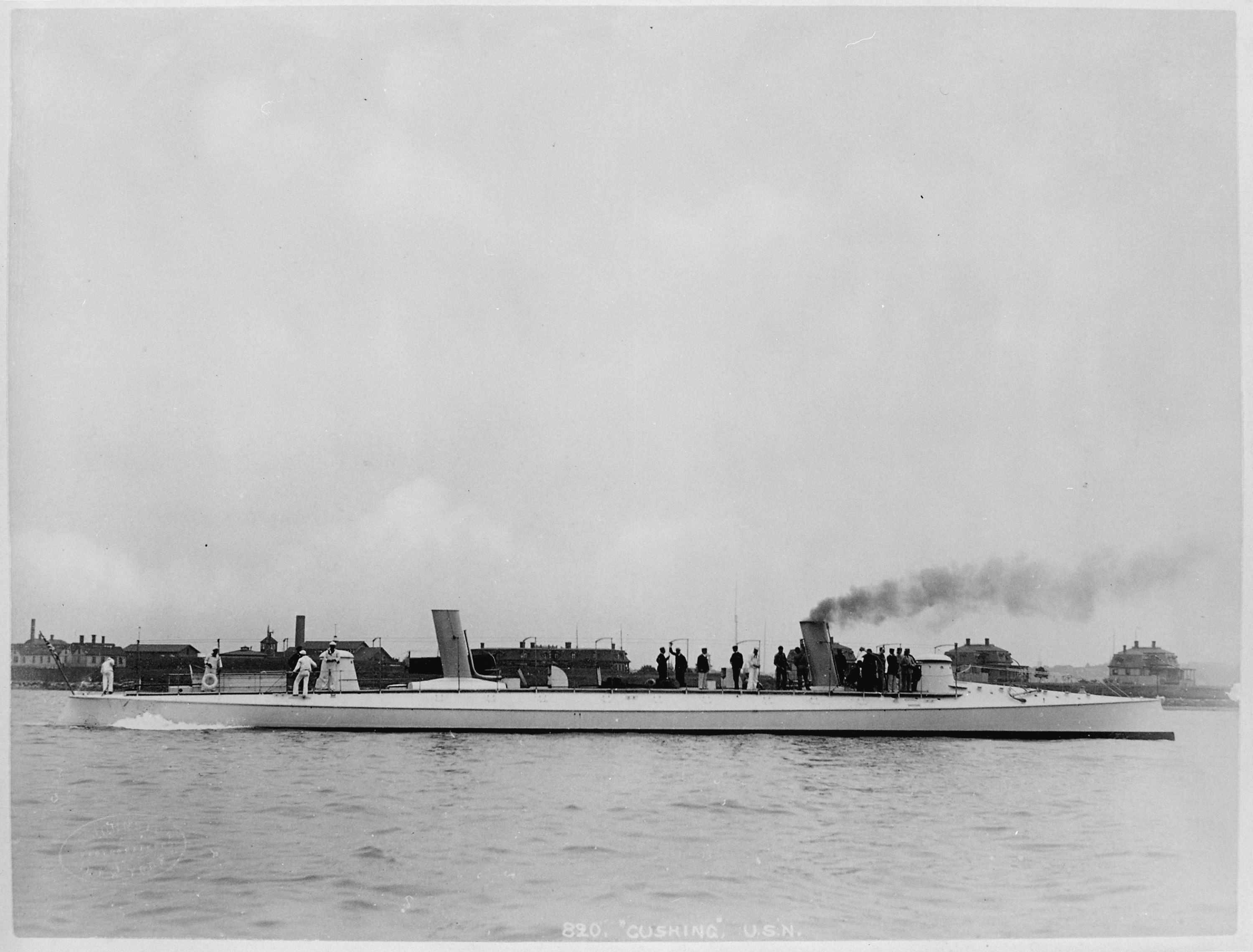
Starboard side, Cushing, 1891

The first torpedo boat built for the Navy, Cushing was attached to the Squadron of Evolution and equipped for experimental work to complete the development of torpedo outfits and to gather data for the service. On 8 September 1891, she reported to Newport, Rhode Island for duty at the Naval Torpedo Station, and except for a brief period out of commission—from 11 November 1891 – 11 January 1892—Cushing continued her torpedo experiments in this area until 1893.

Cushing arrived at Hampton Roads on 31 March 1893 for temporary duty with the Naval Review Fleet, and in April she escorted the British cruisers HMS Blake and HMS Caravels to New York. Cushing returned to duty at Newport on 6 May, working with the Whitehead torpedo. Based on Key West from 31 December 1897, Cushing reported to the North Atlantic Fleet's Blockading Force for picket patrol in the Florida Straits and courier duty for the Force. On 11 February 1898, while making a passage to Havana, Cushing lost Ensign Joseph C. Breckinridge overboard in heavy seas. For their heroic efforts to save him, Gunner's Mate Third Class John Everetts and Ship's Cook First Class Daniel Atkins were awarded the Medal of Honor. The destroyer USS Breckinridge was named after him in 1918.

Upon the declaration of war between the U.S. and Spain, Cushing was assigned to patrol the Cays, and on 7 August captured four small vessels and towed them to her anchorage at Piedras Cay. Four days later, armed boats from Cushing and Gwin captured and burned a 20 long tons (20 t) schooner. Returning north in August 1898, Cushing resumed her operations at the Newport Torpedo Station from 14 September until decommissioned on 8 November 1898. From 1901 to 1911, she was attached to the Reserve Torpedo Flotilla at Norfolk, and was sunk on 24 September 1920 after use as a target.
