= Robert Galbraith (Medal of Honor) =

US Medal-of-Honor recipient (1878–1949)

- Born: 18 February 1878; Brooklyn, New York
- Died: 13 May 1949 (aged 71); Queens, New York
- Resting place: Long Island Nat. Cemetery; 40.7530°N 73.3993°W
- Military career
- Branch: United States Navy
- Rank: Petty officer third class
- Conflicts: Spanish–American War; Philippine–American War; World War I
- Awards: Medal of Honor

Robert Galbraith (18 February 1878 – 13 May 1949) was a United States Navy recipient of the Medal of Honor for his actions in the Philippine–American War.

== Personal life ==
Galbraith was born in Brooklyn, New York on 18 February 1878, the third child of John and Mary Galbraith (born 1857/1858), immigrants from Scotland. On 5 June 1904, Galbraith married Dora Kemmerer in Brooklyn. They had one daughter named Ruth. In 1920, they were living in Brooklyn and Ruth was twelve years old. Galbraith was working as a civilian clothing inspector at the New York Navy Yard.

By 1930, Ruth was married and her parents had divorced. Dora Galbraith was living with her mother and sister in Brooklyn. Robert Galbraith was living on a farm in Brooklyn and working as an inspector with "Cloth U.S. Goom". By 1942, he had moved to Oceanside, New York and told the Selective Service System that he was retired. Galbraith died on 13 May 1949 in Queens, and is buried at Long Island National Cemetery in Section DSS, Site 17. After Dora Galbraith died in 1965, she was interred next to her former husband.

== US Navy ==
Galbraith enlisted in the US Navy prior to his service during the Spanish–American War. In 1899, Galbraith received the Medal of Honor for his service while deployed during the Philippine–American War; Gunner's Mate Third Class Galbraith displayed "extraordinary heroism and gallantry while under fire of the enemy at El Pardo, Cebu, Philippine Islands, 12 and 13 September 1899." Galbraith's medal was issued by the United States Department of War's "General Orders No. 531, November 21, 1899". Prior to leaving the Navy as a quartermaster third class, Galbraith served during World War I.

== See also ==
- List of Philippine–American War Medal of Honor recipients
