= John J. Kedenburg =

United States Army Medal of Honor recipient (1946–1968)

John James Kedenburg
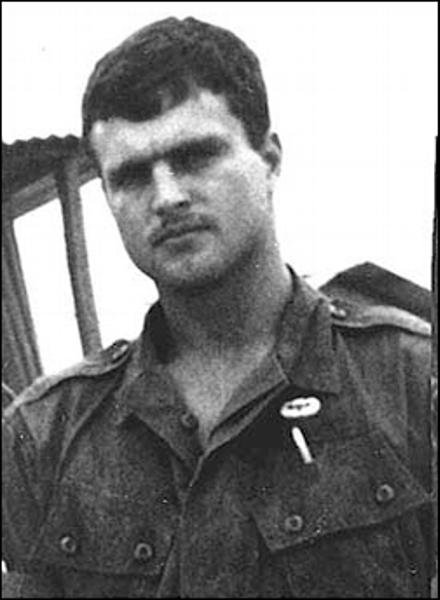
- Kedenburg in Vietnam
- Born: July 31, 1946; Brooklyn, New York, US
- Died: June 14, 1968 (aged 21); Laos
- Burial place: Long Island National Cemetery, Farmingdale, New York
- Military career
- Allegiance: United States
- Branch: United States Army
- Service years: 1965–1968
- Rank: Specialist Five
- Units: 5th Special Forces Group; MACV-SOG
- Conflicts: Vietnam War †
- Awards: Medal of Honor; Bronze Star Medal; Purple Heart

John James Kedenburg (July 31, 1946 – June 14, 1968) was a United States Army soldier and a recipient of the United States military's highest decoration—the Medal of Honor—for his actions in the Vietnam War.

== Biography ==
Kedenburg joined the Army from his birthplace of Brooklyn, New York in 1965, and by June 13, 1968, was serving as a Specialist Five in the 5th Special Forces Group (Airborne), 1st Special Forces. During a fierce firefight on that day, in the Republic of Vietnam/Laos, Kedenburg voluntarily gave the last spot on an extraction helicopter to a South Vietnamese soldier. Ordering the full helicopter to leave, he then continued to engage the enemy alone until being overrun.

A road at Fort Bragg, NC is named in his honor.

Kedenburg, aged 21 at his death, was buried in Long Island National Cemetery, Farmingdale, New York.

== Medal of Honor citation ==
Specialist Kedenburg's official Medal of Honor citation reads:

For conspicuous gallantry and intrepidity in action at the risk of his life above and beyond the call of duty. Sp5 Kedenburg, U.S. Army, Command and Control Detachment North, Forward Operating Base 2, 5th Special Forces Group (Airborne), distinguished himself while serving as advisor to a long-range reconnaissance team of South Vietnamese irregular troops. The team's mission was to conduct counter-guerrilla operations deep within enemy-held territory. Prior to reaching the day's objective, the team was attacked and encircled by a battalion-size North Vietnamese Army force. Sp5 Kedenburg assumed immediate command of the team which succeeded, after a fierce fight, in breaking out of the encirclement. As the team moved through thick jungle to a position from which it could be extracted by helicopter, Sp5 Kedenburg conducted a gallant rear guard fight against the pursuing enemy and called for tactical air support and rescue helicopters. His withering fire against the enemy permitted the team to reach a preselected landing zone with the loss of only 1 man, who was unaccounted for. Once in the landing zone, Sp5 Kedenburg deployed the team into a perimeter defense against the numerically superior enemy force. When tactical air support arrived, he skillfully directed air strikes against the enemy, suppressing their fire so that helicopters could hover over the area and drop slings to be used in the extraction of the team. After half of the team was extracted by helicopter, Sp5 Kedenburg and the remaining 3 members of the team harnessed themselves to the sling on a second hovering helicopter. Just as the helicopter was to lift them out of the area, the South Vietnamese team member who had been unaccounted for after the initial encounter with the enemy appeared in the landing zone. Sp5c. Kedenburg unhesitatingly gave up his place in the sling to the man and directed the helicopter pilot to leave the area. He then continued to engage the enemy who were swarming into the landing zone, killing 6 enemy soldiers before he was overpowered. Sp5 Kedenburg's inspiring leadership, consummate courage and willing self-sacrifice permitted his small team to inflict heavy casualties on the enemy and escape almost certain annihilation. His actions reflect great credit upon himself and the U.S. Army.

== See also ==
- List of Medal of Honor recipients
- List of Medal of Honor recipients for the Vietnam War
