= Raspberry Cough =

Studio album by Petal Head
- Released: September 1, 2015
- Recorded: 2015
- Studio: Hobo House
- Genre: Shoegaze; Stoner Rock; Indie Rock
- Length: 35:28
- Label: Dead Broke Rekerds
- Producer: Phil Douglas, Michael Guidice

Raspberry Cough is the debut studio album by Long Island Shoegaze band Petal Head. The album was recorded and produced by Latterman and Iron Chic guitarist Phil Douglas at his studio in Long Island called The Hobo House. The album was released on Dead Broke Rekerds on September 1, 2015.

== Reception ==
The album received generally favorable reviews upon release. New Noise Magazine wrote “The band strips every dynamic and traditional sense out of conventional Alt Rock and build it up in their own loud and abrasive yet both parts dreamy and droning. Petal Head’s debut album Raspberry Cough takes you on a sonic journey through thick walls of sound into dreamscapes and then back into a dynamic onslaught of riffs without ever compromising the ride.“

== Track listing ==
All music and lyrics written by Michael Guidice.

No.	Title	Length
1.	"Zodiac"	5:12
2.	"Daisy"	3:31
3.	"HeavySoft"	2:28
4.	"Bleach Kiss"	3:36
5.	"Palewinds"	1:55
6.	"Spooky Something"	4:44
7.	"X"	3:36
8.	"Heaven Grinder"	3:36
9.	"Sonic Nowhere"	3:42

== Personnel ==
- Michael Guidice - Vocals, Guitars, Keyboards
- Andy Laurino - Bass
- Bradley Cordaro - Drums
- Phil Douglas, Michael Guidice - Production
- Carl Saff - Mastering
- Bráulio Amado - Artwork
