= You Can't Stay Here =

Studio album by Iron Chic
- Released: October 13, 2017
- Recorded: 2016–2017
- Studio: Hobo House
- Genre: Pop-punk; punk rock
- Length: 36:32
- Label: SideOneDummy
- Producer: Phil Douglas

Iron Chic chronology
| The Constant One (2013) | You Can't Stay Here (2017) |

You Can't Stay Here is the third studio album by Long Island punk rock band Iron Chic. Like the band's previous work, the album was recorded in guitarist Phil Douglas' studio, The Hobo House. This was the first album with former Broadcaster guitarist Jesse Litwa replacing the late Rob McAllister on guitar.

== Background ==
Following the touring for The Constant One in 2015, the band parted ways with guitarist Rob McAllister. Mattie Jo Canino of Latterman, RVIVR and Tender Defender filled in temporarily before Broadcaster guitarist Jesse Litwa assumed the role permanently shortly thereafter. Upon reconvening to begin writing sessions for the album- the band was informed that former guitarist Rob McAllister had died. This, coupled with singer Jason Lubrano's divorce informed the writing for the album. On the writing of the album, Lubrano explained, "When we write music, it takes a little while for us to congeal our songs and ideas into a record. It wasn’t really until we were almost done with the record that that was really super apparent to us, but I think we just felt like it was right to be that way. It would have been too much if it was super dark musically or heavy or whatever. It might be a little bit too much to take in. This was sort of like the honey with the medicine." The band released a music video for "My Best Friend (Is A Nihilist)" On October 10, 2017, the band premiered "Planes, Chest Pains & Automobiles" via NPR.

== Reception ==
The album received critical acclaim upon release. New Noise Magazine gave the album a glowing review citing that "the themes of You Can’t Stay Here are undoubtedly dark, yes, but the externalization of them — casting them into light and setting them to a fierce, determined melody — is a cry for survival and perseverance. This album is a tribute to fortitude, not weakness. Iron Chic has been through one hell of a fucking year, but they’re still standing, and they made this record together." Bad Copy wrote of the album, "From beginning to end, every second of this album kept my attention in the same way a roller coaster might. There were natural feelings of euphoria that quickly dipped into realizations of my own mortality. When it was all said and done, however, I couldn’t believe it was over." Exclaim! acknowledged the existentialism on the album stating "There's not a ton of hope to be found on You Can't Stay Here; with any sort of personal tragedy, it takes time to make sense of it. But what does emerge is a strong sense of togetherness; the hurt hasn't changed them, but it has strengthened their will."

== Track listing ==
All music written by Iron Chic.

| No. | Title | Length |
|---|---|---|
| 1. | "A Headache With Pictures" | 3:49 |
| 2. | "My Best Friend (Is A Nihilist) (feat. Carly Commando of Slingshot Dakota)" | 3:32 |
| 3. | "You Can't Stay Safe" | 2:27 |
| 4. | "Let's. Get. Dangerous." | 3:56 |
| 5. | "Thunderbolts!" | 3:33 |
| 6. | "Planes, Chest Pains & Automobiles" | 3:11 |
| 7. | "Golgotha" | 3:04 |
| 8. | "Profane Geometry" | 3:17 |
| 9. | "Invisible Ink" | 3:18 |
| 10. | "Ruinous Calamity" | 3:13 |
| 11. | "To Shreds, You Say?" | 4:41 |

== Personnel ==
- Jason Lubrano – vocals, artwork
- Phil Douglas – guitars, vocals, production
- Jesse Litwa – guitar
- Mike Bruno – Bass
- Gordon Lafler – drums
