= Tender Defender =

American punk rock band

- Origin: Huntington Station, New York, United States
- Genres: Punk rock, pop punk
- Years active: 2015–present
- Labels: Dead Broke Rekerds, Yo-Yo Records
- Spinoff of: Latterman
- Members: Mattie Jo Canino; Phil Douglas; Pat Schramm

Tender Defender is an American three-piece punk rock band from Huntington, New York, United States. All three members of the band (bassist/vocalist Mattie Jo Canino, guitarist/vocalist Phil Douglas and drummer Pat Schramm) are ex-members of Latterman. Tender Defender is considered by many to be a continuation of Latterman. The band released their self-titled debut on Dead Broke Rekerds on March 3, 2016.

== Background ==
Following the break-up of Latterman, the members of the band went on to start several new projects- most notably Iron Chic, RVIVR, Laura Stevenson & The Cans and Bridge and Tunnel. Following the break up, the band stayed in touch and saw each other regularly between touring and Douglas producing several projects for both Canino and Schramm. In 2011, Latterman began playing occasional reunion shows which instigated the conversation of new music. Instead of releasing new music under the Latterman name and reform into a 4-piece, the band chose to record and perform as a 3-piece instead taking on the name Tender Defender with the core Latterman lineup of Douglas, Canino and Schramm. On the topic of not continuing as Latterman and forming a new band altogether, bassist/vocalist Mattie Jo Canino explained "Pat, Phil and I were the three most consistent members of Latterman anyways, the only people who are on every record and every tour besides our very first one. But actually it's Tender Defender, not Latterman. Kind of like how Jesus is 100% man and 100% God, except gayer and dirtier. I mean, we could have just called it Latterman but since we're not fucking poseurs we came up with a new band and some kick ass new jams. Also, of course it's fair to compare the two bands. It's the same people writing the same type of songs; we're just older, prettier and smarter now. Or maybe stupider, who knows."

On July 30, 2015, the band released their first single, "Hello Dirt", off of a tentative upcoming album. To coincide with the release of the single, the band played their first show at Saint Vitus in Brooklyn with Shellshag on August 16, 2015. The self-titled Mini-LP was recorded in Douglas' Hobo House studio with the artwork being done by Schramm. The album was released on March 3, 2016 on Dead Broke Rekerds to rave reviews. The band embarked on an international month long tour in April 2016 in support of the album.

In 2018 Tender Defender announced new tour dates.

== Discography ==
- Tender Defender (2015, Dead Broke Rekerds, Yo-Yo Records)

== Members ==
- Mattie Jo Canino - Vocals/Bass
- Phil Douglas - Vocals/Guitar
- Pat Schramm - Drums
