= Blood on the Silver Screen =

2025 studio album by Sasami

Studio album by Sasami
- Released: March 7, 2025
- Recorded: 2022
- Genre: Pop
- Length: 41:08
- Label: Domino
- Producers: Sasami; Jennifer Decilveo; Rostam Batmanglij

Sasami chronology
Squeeze (2022)	Blood on the Silver Screen (2025)

Singles from Blood on the Silver Screen
- 1. "Honeycrash" Released: May 29, 2024; 2. "Slugger" Released: September 23, 2024; 3. "Just Be Friends" Released: November 13, 2024; 4. "In Love with a Memory" Released: January 28, 2025

Blood on the Silver Screen is the third studio album by the American musician Sasami. A pop record, it follows her 2022 hard rock and industrial metal album Squeeze and her eponymous 2019 indie rock debut. In 2022, Sasami alternated between writing from her home in rural northern California and recording with the pop producers Jennifer Decilveo and Rostam Batmanglij in Los Angeles; the album was mostly completed by the end of that year. Before writing the album, she used her classical training to study pop as a genre, listening to artists like Britney Spears, Adele, Rihanna, and Lady Gaga. The album is structured around a core protagonist created by Sasami moving between a different film genre or setting in each track. Critics have stated that it covers themes of love, lust, and emotions. The album was released on March 7, 2025, by Domino to generally positive reviews, with critics citing Sasami's songwriting and production.

== Background and recording ==
After graduating from the Eastman School of Music, where she studied French horn performance and music education, Sasami began her music career teaching in Los Angeles. From 2015 to 2018, she played synths for the indie rock band Cherry Glazerr. In 2019, she released her first solo album, an eponymous indie rock record. Sasami shifted toward hard rock and industrial metal for her 2022 album Squeeze, and changed her sound again for her third album—Blood on the Silver Screen—embracing pop.

Sasami began writing Blood on the Silver Screen in January 2022 after she moved from Los Angeles to rural northern California. She recorded the album in LA with the pop producers Jennifer Decilveo and Rostam Batmanglij. The album was almost completed within one year. In an interview with The Line of Best Fit, Sasami said that she had originally wanted to quickly release the album and move on to a different project; however, the album's release was delayed because Sasami's label, Domino, wanted to build up its promotion. The album was preceded by four singles: "Honeycrash" (2024), "Slugger" (2024), "Just Be Friends" (2024), and "In Love with a Memory" (2025).

== Composition and themes ==
Sasami said that the process of composing Blood on the Silver Screen involved "learning and respecting the craft of pop songwriting", which she compared to learning a new language. While touring around the release of Squeeze, Sasami "got very immersed" in pop music, listening to artists like Britney Spears, Adele, Rihanna, and Lady Gaga, and using her classical training to analyze the genre. She told NME that writing pop songs required her to be "earnest", which felt "edgy" to her, and that she tried to add humor to her songs. Sasami and Rostam also drew on their classical training in composing the album's tracks. Critics have generally described the album's genre as pop.

Sasami was also influenced by film when writing the songs. In an interview with Exclaim!, Sasami said that "the thing that makes it pop ... is that it makes the listener feel like a main character". According to Exclaim!, Sasami described the main character of the album as an "Asian femme protagonist: a wild-haired alien gunslinger clad in Bruce Springsteen's Americana denim, who must face the shapeshifting personified character of love". Sasami has described each song as depicting that character in a different genre film. Laura David in The Line of Best Fit wrote that each track represents "its own cinematic genre", and evaluated together they create a narrative of "big love, expansive experiences, and big feelings". Likewise, Clare Martin in Paste said that the album "fixates" on pop's "favorite subjects: love and lust". Sasami stated that the album is "about relenting to illogical passion, obsession, and guiltless pleasure" and "leaning into the chaos of romance and sweeping devotion—romanticism to the point of self-destruction".

== Critical reception ==
Professional ratings
Aggregate scores
Source	Rating
AnyDecentMusic?	7.1/10
Metacritic	74/100
Review scores
Source	Rating
AllMusic	3/5 stars
Clash	7/10
DIY	4/5 stars
The Line of Best Fit	7/10
New Noise Magazine	4.5/5 stars
The Observer	3/5 stars
Paste	7.0/10
Pitchfork	6.8/10
PopMatters	9/10
The Skinny	3/5 stars
Uncut	8/10
Under the Radar	7.5/10 stars

According to the review aggregator Metacritic, Blood on the Silver Screen received "generally favorable reviews" based on a weighted average score of 74 out of 100 from 11 critic scores. Sarah Jamieson gave the album 4 out of 5 stars in DIY, highlighting the album's channeling of pop music's "gutsy, confidence-boosting spirit". Amy Perdoni, rating the album 7 out of 10, wrote in The Line of Best Fit that the album "understands power and grandeur", citing its "firm hooks and epic guitar solos". Damien Morris for The Observer gave the album 3 out of 5 stars, writing that it contains "sprightly, shiny pop" through which Sasami "pick[s] over matters of the heart". For New Noise Magazine, Ray Romanski awarded the album 4.5 out of 5 stars, calling it a "catharsis album for Sasami". Likewise, Carlo Thomas in Under the Radar said that the album is "rewarding for listeners precisely because it was a rewarding experience for the artist herself". He gave the album 7.5 out of 10 stars. Lisa-Marie Ferla gave the album 8 out of 10 for Uncut, writing that Sasami channeled "madness, obsession[,] and desire ... into big, bold pop songs". She compared the album to Robyn's 2010 single "Dancing on My Own"—but "with added sports metaphors".

Erin Bashford, rating the album 7 out of 10 in Clash, wrote that although the album had "fewer standout moments" than Sasami's previous records, it had "moments of beauty" and "something to love in every track". Clare Martin in Paste also gave the album 7 out of 10. She praised the album's opening track, "Slugger", comparing it to the indie pop band Muna and stating that it invites the listener to dance along. However, she said that while most of the tracks had her "bopping along" in the moment, she had forgotten the choruses.

Editors at AllMusic rated the album 3 out of 5 stars, with critic Tim Sendra writing that the "dramatic and slightly gritty songs are the ones that work the best". Sendra also praised "In Love with a Memory", particularly its "classical-meets-metal guitar solo". However, he wrote that most of the tracks, such as "Slugger", "Lose It All", and "Just Be Friends", had a "cookie-cutter sameness" and were "too desperate for mass success". Similarly, Vrinda Jagota for Pitchfork said that the music was "aimless", somewhere in between Sasami's prior genre-bending albums and pop's energy, and Sasami's performance was "distant", writing "she sings about heartache, one of life's most evocative experiences, as if she's on the end of a game of telephone, recounting someone else's experiences fourth-hand". Mark Richardson in The Wall Street Journal stated that the album is "frustratingly inconsistent, with a handful of great tracks that don't quite offset the dull patches". Rho Chung awarded the album 3 out of 5 stars for The Skinny, criticizing it for "lacking the raw edge of intuition" of Sasami's previous albums.

== Track listing ==
No.	Title	Writer(s)	Producer(s)	Length
1.	"Slugger"	Sasami Ashworth; Jennifer Decilveo	Ashworth; Decilveo	3:00
2.	"Just Be Friends"	Ashworth; Decilveo	Ashworth; Decilveo	3:37
3.	"I'll Be Gone"	Ashworth	Ashworth; Decilveo	3:28
4.	"Love Makes You Do Crazy Things"	Ashworth; Decilveo	Ashworth; Decilveo	3:45
5.	"In Love with a Memory" (featuring Clairo)	Ashworth; Rostam Batmanglij	Ashworth; Batmanglij	4:03
6.	"Possessed"	Ashworth; Decilveo	Ashworth; Decilveo	3:49
7.	"Figure It Out"	Ashworth; Decilveo	Ashworth; Decilveo	2:53
8.	"For the Weekend"	Ashworth; Decilveo	Ashworth; Decilveo	2:48
9.	"Honeycrash"	Ashworth; Decilveo	Ashworth; Decilveo	3:08
10.	"Smoke (Banished from Eden)"	Ashworth	Ashworth	0:37
11.	"Nothing but a Sad Face On"	Ashworth	Ashworth; Decilveo	3:26
12.	"Lose It All"	Ashworth; Decilveo	Ashworth; Decilveo	2:52
13.	"The Seed"	Ashworth; Batmanglij	Ashworth; Batmanglij	3:36
Total length:				41:08

== Personnel ==
Credits are from the album jacket.

- Sasami Ashworth – writer, executive producer, engineer, mixing (track 10), vocals, and guitar
- Jennifer Decilveo – producer and engineer (tracks 1–4, 6–12)
- Rostam Batmanglij – producer and engineer (tracks 5, 13)
- Sean Cook – engineer (tracks 1–4, 6–12)
- Danielle Goldsmith – engineer (tracks 1–4, 6–12)
- Nick Squillante – engineer (tracks 1–4, 6–12)
- Joey Messina-Doerning – engineer (tracks 5, 13)
- Daniel Aged – bass
- Graham Brooks – guitar
- Claire Cottrill – featured vocals on "In Love with a Memory"
- Meg Duffy – guitar
- Sam KS – drums and percussion
- Kenneth Steiger – guitar
- Andrew Tachine – drums and percussion
- Kyle Thomas – guitar
- Geoff Swan – mixing (tracks 1–4, 6–12)
- Matt Cahill – mixing (tracks 1–4, 6–12)
- Dave Fridmann – mixing (tracks 5, 13)
- Michael Fridmann – mixing (tracks 5, 13)
- Chris Gehringer – mastering

== Charts ==
Chart performance for Blood on the Silver Screen
Chart (2025)	Peak position
UK Album Downloads (Official Charts)	98
UK Independent Albums (Official Charts)	20
