= Michael Campbell (American musician, born 1985) =

Mike Campbell
- Born: August 7, 1985 (age 40)
- Origin: Huntington Station, New York
- Genres: Punk, rock, folk
- Instruments: Guitar, bass, Omnichord, chord organ
- Years active: 2000–present

Michael "Mike" Campbell (born August 7, 1985) is an American guitarist and bassist, from Huntington Station, New York, best known for his work with Laura Stevenson, and Latterman.

== Professional background ==
Latterman

While attending Walt Whitman High School in Huntington Station, New York, Campbell joined Long Island punk band Latterman, led by classmates Phil Douglas and Matt Canino. He recorded and performed as a guitarist in Latterman until shortly before they disbanded in 2007.

After almost four years apart, Latterman briefly reunited with Campbell on guitar, for a series of New York-area concerts in December 2011, followed by a full European tour in the summer of 2012, and an appearance at The Fest in Gainesville, Florida in October 2012.

Laura Stevenson

In the summer of 2007, just after leaving Latterman, Campbell met Laura Stevenson, and began performing as the bass player for Laura Stevenson and the Cans. Stevenson has credited Campbell as the inspiration for one of her earliest songs, "A Shine to It", and also has cited him as the one who encouraged her to record her first album, A Record. They got married in 2016 and have one child together.

== Discography ==
| Year | Title | Label |
|---|---|---|
| 2002 | Latterman – Turn Up The Punk, We'll Be Singing | Deep Elm Records |
| 2005 | Latterman – No Matter Where We Go... | Deep Elm Records |
| 2008 | Laura Stevenson – A Record | Asian Man Records/Quote Unquote Records |
| 2008 | The Brass – Homosapien (EP) | Dead Broke Records |
| 2009 | Laura Stevenson and the Cans/Bomb The Music Industry! (split 7-inch) | Kiss Of Death Records |
| 2009 | Laura Stevenson and the Cans – Holy Ghost! (EP) | Mandible Records |
| 2009 | Kudrow – Lando (EP) | Ernest Jennings Records |
| 2011 | Laura Stevenson and the Cans – Sit Resist | Don Giovanni Records |
| 2013 | Laura Stevenson – Wheel | Don Giovanni Records |
| 2015 | Laura Stevenson – Cocksure | Don Giovanni Records |
| 2019 | Laura Stevenson – The Big Freeze | Don Giovanni Records |
