= Phil Douglas =

Phil Douglas may refer to:

- Phil Douglas (baseball) (1890–1952), American baseball player
- Phil Douglas (musician), American musician and producer
