= Stuffed & Ready =

Studio album by Cherry Glazerr
- Released: February 1, 2019
- Genre: Indie rock
- Length: 31:58
- Label: Secretly Canadian
- Producer: Carlos de la Garza

Cherry Glazerr chronology
Houses of the Holy, Vol. 1 (2018)	Stuffed & Ready (2019)	I Don't Want You Anymore (2023)

Singles from Stuffed & Ready
- 1. "Juicy Socks" Released: April 12, 2018; 2. "Daddi" Released: November 8, 2018; 3. "Wasted Nun" Released: January 10, 2019

Stuffed & Ready is the third studio album by American rock band Cherry Glazerr, released on February 1, 2019, through Secretly Canadian.

== Release and recording ==
On April 12, 2018, Cherry Glazerr released a new song titled "Juicy Socks" as the first single from the album. On November 8, the band announced Stuffed & Ready, which serves as the follow-up to their 2017 record Apocalipstick. The announcement was accompanied by the release of the second single, "Daddi", and its music video. On January 10, 2019, the band released "Wasted Nun" as the third single alongside a music video.

Stuffed & Ready is the band's first record since the departure of former synth player Sasami Ashworth and with the addition of bassist Devin O'Brien. The album was originally recorded in early 2018 with musician and engineer John Vanderslice, but was eventually redone with Carlos de la Garza (who co-produced Apocalipstick) in the span of six months.

In a press release, lead singer and guitarist Clementine Creevy stated, "With Apocalipstick, I was an over-confident teenager trying to solve the world's problems. With Stuffed & Ready, I'm a much more weary and perhaps cynical woman who believes you need to figure your own self out first", further elaborating: "I've been feeling the need to explain my feelings … not just state them, but search for why I feel the way I do in the most honest way possible. This is what separates this album from its predecessor. I'm trying to stop myself from obfuscation, which I used to hide behind, but not anymore. I'm writing with intent."

== Critical reception ==
Professional ratings
Aggregate scores
Source	Rating
Metacritic	75/100
Review scores
Source	Rating
The 405	8.5/10
DIY	3/5 stars
Drowned in Sound	7/10
The Line of Best Fit	8/10
NME	4/5 stars
PopMatters	4/5 stars
The Skinny	3/5 stars
Slant Magazine	4/5 stars
Uncut	8/10
Under the Radar	3.5/5 stars

At Metacritic, which assigns a normalized rating out of 100 to reviews from mainstream publications, Stuffed & Ready received an average score of 75, based on 13 reviews, indicating "generally favorable reviews". Waterman Cole of PopMatters wrote, "Stuffed & Ready is their finest accomplishment yet of such a daunting endeavor. And with its personal perspectives on the effects of the current cultural zeitgeist, it is not simply a great rock record, but an important document in the early days of 2019." The 405's Todd Dedman called Stuffed & Ready "a slick, polished rock album with a clear lineage from bands such as L7, Sleater-Kinney and Celebrity Skin-era Hole to more contemporary acts such as Du Blonde, Dream Wife and Pip Blom." NME writer Thomas Smith called it the band's "most mature and measured album, both lyrically and musically." Similarly, Slant Magazine's Gabriel Fine called it "Cherry Glazerr's most mature and complex album to date."

The Line of Best Fit critic Steve Lampiris stated, "While Stuffed & Ready shares the glossy sheen (thanks to Carlos de la Garza), who returns for a second go-round as producer) and excellent songwriting of its predecessor, 2017's Apocalipstick, the former is darker and more insular both musically and lyrically." Lee Adcock of Under the Radar wrote, "Without any doubt, the Cherry Glazerr gang has never been stronger. But while that ten-ton force can bring you to your knees (especially the hair-metal-heavy "Stupid Fish"), the weight often crushes out the devil-may-care humor that made Apocalipstick such a blast." Lisa Wright of DIY said, "While not a record that's likely to raise their star, Stuffed & Ready is one that shows a band resolutely ploughing their own furrow without compromise."

== Track listing ==
All tracks are written by Clementine Creevy.

No.	Title	Length
1.	"Ohio"	2:51
2.	"Daddi"	3:11
3.	"Wasted Nun"	3:18
4.	"That's Not My Real Life" (featuring Delicate Steve)	2:57
5.	"Self Explained"	3:36
6.	"Isolation"	3:03
7.	"Juicy Socks"	3:13
8.	"Pieces"	2:14
9.	"Stupid Fish"	4:13
10.	"Distressor"	3:22
Total length:		31:58

== Personnel ==
- Clementine Creevy – vocals, guitar
- Devin O'Brien – bass
- Tabor Allen – drums
- Carlos de la Garza – production
