= Clementine Creevy =

American musician (born 1996)

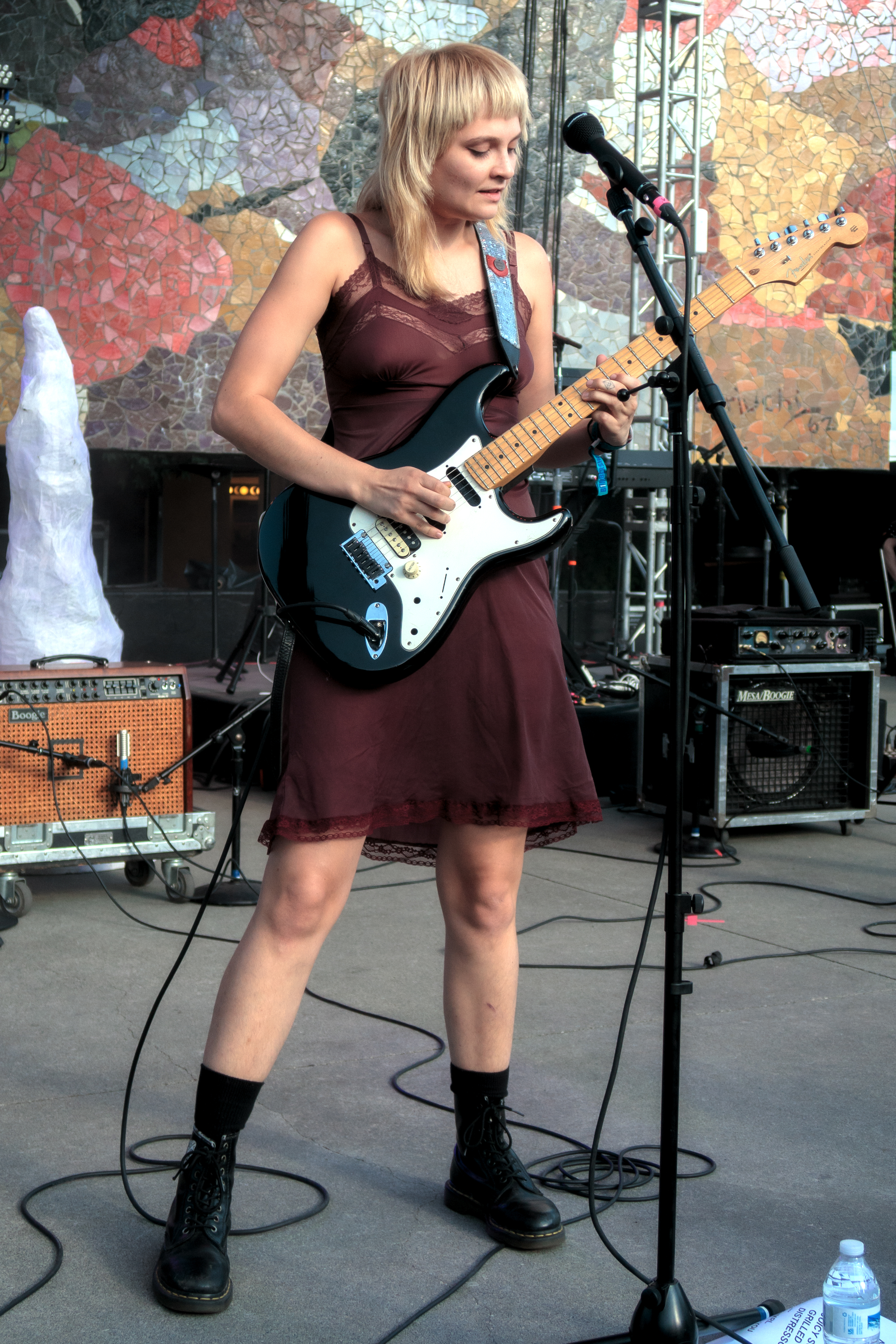
- Creevy in 2018

Background information
- Born: December 11, 1996 (age 29); Los Angeles, California, U.S.
- Genres: Noise pop, garage rock, indie rock, grunge
- Occupations: Singer; songwriter; musician
- Instruments: Vocals; guitar
- Years active: 2012–present
- Labels: Burger Records, Secretly Canadian

Clementine Creevy (born December 11, 1996) is an American singer-songwriter. She is best known as a founding member of the rock band Cherry Glazerr.

== Early life ==
Clementine Creevy was born on December 11, 1996, in Los Angeles. Her mother is a novelist. Her father is the American TV writer and producer Nicholas Wootton.

== Career ==
Clementine Creevy started her musical career as a high school student with the solo project Clembutt in 2012, uploading a number of tracks onto SoundCloud. The tracks were discovered by Sean Bohrman at Burger Records who released the tracks in 2013 under the title Papa Cremp. In 2013, Creevy formed the band Cherry Glazerr. The band have released four albums including Haxel Princess, Apocalipstick, Stuffed & Ready and I Don't Want You Anymore.

From 2014 to 2015, Creevy appeared as the recurring character Margaux in the TV series Transparent. In the series, her character leads the fictional rock band Glitterish.

In 2017, VICE magazine produced a short autobiographical documentary about Creevy titled Clementine Creevy: The Millenial [sic] Punk Feminist Icon. Creevy is featured on Tyler, The Creator's album Cherry Bomb, on the song "Okaga, CA", and supplied guest vocals for the Death Grips song "Giving Bad People Good Ideas", on the album Bottomless Pit.

Creevy has modelled for the Australian designer Emma Mulholland.

== Personal life ==
In an Instagram post in July 2020, Creevy accused former Cherry Glazerr bandmate, and bassist of The Buttertones, Sean Redman of statutory rape. In response, Innovative Leisure, the record label for The Buttertones, announced they would be dropping the band immediately.
