= Not Like This =

Studio album by Iron Chic
- Released: September 1, 2010
- Recorded: 2009–2010
- Studio: Hobo House
- Genre: Pop punk; punk rock
- Length: 30:58
- Label: Dead Broke Rekerds
- Producer: Phil Douglas

Iron Chic chronology
Not Like This (2010)	The Constant One (2013)

Not Like This is the debut studio album by Long Island punk rock band Iron Chic. The album was recorded in guitarist Phil Douglas' studio, The Hobo House and released on bassist Mike Bruno's Dead Broke Rekerds.

== Background ==
In 2008 and 2009 respectively, the band released Demo 2008 and the Shitty Rambo EP amassing a sizable underground following and critical buzz. During this time the band almost broke up with guitarist Brian Crozier having to step down from the band due to illness and bassist John Mee being ejected due to tensions within the band. Rob McAllister of Capital and Mike Bruno of Down In The Dumps, Jonesin' and Get Bent were chosen to replace Crozier and Mee respectively. This lineup began writing their first full-length immediately following the inclusion of McAllister and Bruno into the band with "In One Ear" and "Timecop"- originally released on the band's 2008 Demo- being re-recorded for the album. This album is notable for featuring "Cutesy Monster Man" and "Time Keeps On Slipping Into The (Cosmic) Future", 2 songs that would go on to be fan favorites and permanent fixtures of the band's set list. The album was initially released on Bruno's Dead Broke Rekerds on September 1, 2010.

== Reception ==
The album was well received upon release and helped win the band a larger audience. Punknews.org gave the album 4.5 out of 5 stars and stating, "Iron Chic's songs are each very anthemic with a lot of vocal harmonies backed by '90s emo guitars, along with those very distorted bass tones that always have a heavy presence in my favorite songs on the album; the drums range from keeping a solid mid-tempo presence to the full punk rock gallop in a few places. All of these elements are met with lyrics that demand to be sung along to." Exclaim! gave the album a glowing review stating "An essential aspect of Iron Chic's success on Not Like This is vocalist Jason Lubrano's oft-poetic lyrics...it's extremely listenable while still possessing the charming air of being recorded in a Long Island basement. These songs are designed for sing-alongs in dive bars and at basement shows, but the lyrics make it deserving of a focused listen. It's easy to get behind something so sincere, genuine and legitimately inspiring. Rate Your Music has the album rated at 3.51 stars out of 5 based on 140 ratings indicating favorable reviews.

== Track listing ==
All music written by Iron Chic.

No.	Title	Length
1.	"Cutesy Monster Man"	3:56
2.	"Time Keeps on Slipping Into the (Cosmic) Future"	3:21
3.	"Timecop"	2:23
4.	"I Always Never Said That"	2:21
5.	"Black Friday"	2:06
6.	"Know What I Mean, Jellybean?"	3:11
7.	"Awes-nificent"	2:51
8.	"In One Ear"	3:35
9.	"Bustin' (Makes Me Feel Good)"	3:26
10.	"Every Town Has An Elm Street"	3:31

== Personnel ==
- Jason Lubrano - Vocals
- Phil Douglas- Guitars, Vocals, Production
- Rob McAllister - Guitar
- Mike Bruno- Bass
- Gordon Lafler- Drums
