= Iron Chic =

American musical group

Background information
- Origin: Long Island, New York, United States
- Genres: Punk rock, pop punk, emo, alternative rock
- Years active: 2008–present
- Labels: Bridge Nine Records, Dead Broke Rekerds and Side One Dummy.
- Members: Jason Lubrano - Vocals; Phil Douglas - Guitar; Jesse Litwa - Guitar; Mike Bruno - Bass; Gordon Lafler - Drums
- Past members: Rob McAllister; Brian Crozier; John Mee
- Website: Official Website

Iron Chic is an American rock band from Long Island, New York, United States. The band consists of Phil Douglas, Jason Lubrano, Gordon Lafler, Mike Bruno, and Jesse Litwa. The band has released 3 records to date. All three of their albums have received positive reviews on websites such as Pitchfork, Noisey and PunkNews.org. The band released their third album and first for SideOneDummy Records, titled You Can't Stay Here, on October 13, 2017.

== History ==
Iron Chic was formed in 2008 after the dissolution of Phil Douglas' and Brian Crozier's former band Latterman. Following Latterman's break up, Douglas initially joined Small Arms Dealer as a drummer which featured vocalist Jason Lubrano. Small Arms Dealer broke up shortly thereafter with Lubrano and Douglas deciding to start a new band altogether, recruiting Crozier, as well as drummer Gordon Lafler and bassist John Mee. This band released the Demo 2008 and Shitty Rambo under this line up. The band almost broke up the following year when Crozier had to leave the band due to health issues and Mee was asked to leave due to tension within the band. The band immediately chose to continue with Rob McAllister of Capital, and Mike Bruno of Down In The Dumps, Get Bent and Jonesin' as well as owner/operator of Dead Broke Rekerds replacing Crozier and Mee respectively. The new lineup released the debut album, Not Like This, to critical acclaim. The band toured steadily through the year in support of Not Like This and released their 3rd EP, Split N' Shit in 2011.

In 2013, the band released the Spooky Action EP in anticipation for their Bridge Nine Records debut The Constant One, which followed later in the year to once again critical acclaim. In 2015 the band replaced Rob McAllister with Broadcaster guitarist Jesse Litwa and released 2 EP's over the course the year: A split with New Mexico's Low Culture and the Y's single. Rob McAllister unexpectedly died on January 9, 2016, at the age of 36.

In 2017 the band released their third album overall and first for SideOneDummy Records titled You Can't Stay Here. Written in response to singer Jason Lubrano's divorce and McAllister's death, the album showcased more darker themes and experimentation in contrast to their previous work. They released their first music video for the album's second track, "My Best Friend (Is A Nihilist)". The band toured with Propaghandi, Hot Water Music and Heartsounds in support of the album.

On November 16, 2018, the band released a split with Toys That Kill composed of songs from the You Can't Stay Here sessions. It was released via Recess Records and the band's own Dead Broke Rekerds.

== DIY ethic ==
The band has earned recognition and respect for being an entirely self-sustaining band. All the band's recordings are handled by guitarist Phil Douglas at his studio: The Hobo House (Douglas has also produced music by Latterman, RVIVR, Petal Head, Crash The Calm and Tender Defender), all the band's artwork is done by singer Jason Lubrano who also runs graphic design company Righteous Indignation with additional designs provided by drummer Gordon Lafler and all the band's merch, EP's and albums (except for 2013's The Constant One and 2017's You Can't Stay Here) is handled and distributed though bassist Mike Bruno's Dead Broke Rekerds (who has also released albums from Samiam and Fifteen).

== Discography ==
=== Albums ===
- 2010: Not Like This (Dead Broke Rekerds)
- 2013: The Constant One (Bridge Nine Records)
- 2017: You Can't Stay Here (SideOneDummy Records)

=== EPs and singles ===
- 2008: Demo 2008 (Dead Broke Rekerds)
- 2009: Shitty Rambo (Dead Broke Rekerds)
- 2011: Split N' Shit (Dead Broke Rekerds)
- 2013: Spooky Action (Bridge Nine Records)
- 2015: Split w/ Low Culture (Dead Broke Rekerds)
- 2015: Y's (Poison City Records)
- 2017: My Best Friend (Is A Nihilist) (SideOneDummy)
- 2018: Split with Toys That Kill (Recess Records/Dead Broke Rekerds)
- 2021: Catgut (Dead Broke Rekerds)
- 2023: Ancient Pistol (Iron Chic)
