= Punknews.org =

Canadian music website

- Website type: Music journalism, online music community
- Available in: English
- Founded: October 1999; 27 years ago
- Country of origin: Canada
- Creator: Aubin Paul
- Website: www.punknews.org
- Commercial: Yes
- Registration: Optional
- Current status: Active

Punknews.org, or Punknews, is a Canadian music journalism website and online music community focused on punk music and the subculture. It was founded in October 1999 by Aubin Paul in Ontario, Canada, and comprises news and reviews. The site is regarded as one of the most influential punk music websites.

== History ==
Aubin Paul founded Punknews.org in Ontario, Canada, in October 1999. The site focuses on music news regarding the punk subculture, including hardcore, ska, emo and indie. Described as "community-based", it allows registered users to submit content to the site under editorial discretion, such as news, album reviews and comments. The site features a review system of five stars, with half a star as the lowest rating. During the 2000s, the site's positive album reviews included Against Me!'s Reinventing Axl Rose (2002) and As the Eternal Cowboy (2003). Negative reviews of albums from the time period included My Chemical Romance's Three Cheers for Sweet Revenge (2004), and Silverstein's When Broken Is Easily Fixed (2003).

In 2005, Punknews formed its own record label, Punknews Records, partnering with Epitaph Records for distribution. The site launched a weekly podcast in 2010. In 2012, the now-defunct BuzzMedia acquired Punknews alongside AbsolutePunk.net, Property of Zack and Under the Gun Review; all four sites were under the AbsoluteVoices collective for punk-related news. In 2016, Punknews posted a soon-taken down April Fools joke article about Latterman reuniting, which coincided with the band's plans to perform several shows later that October; the band previously announced their breakup in Punknews. One year later, Punknews organized the annual Summer Soiree event in Philadelphia on August 12.

== Impact ==
Punknews is considered one of the most influential punk websites, and a pioneer of online music discussion. Journalist Matt Diehl asserted that it was "the world-wide-webbed CNN of neo-punk" in his 2007 book My So-Called Punk. The 2025 book In Too Deep called Punknews "the premier web forum for punk rock". Writer G'Ra Asim, who contributed interviews to Punknews, regarded it as an iconic punk site in his 2021 book Boyz n the Void: a mixtape to my brother.

Bands such as Matchbook Romance and Motion City Soundtrack garnered an audience from Punknews. The former signed to Epitaph Records following the label's owner Brett Gurewitz discovering their song "Ex Marks the Spot" on the site. Among other music websites, Punknews was credited for pioneering the "Orgcore" subgenre of punk. It comprises bands recommended among Punknews and Pitchfork users, most prominently Alkaline Trio, Dillinger Four, and Hot Water Music.
