= Haxel Princess =

Studio album by Cherry Glazerr
- Released: January 14, 2014
- Recorded: 2013
- Studio: Abbey Road West
- Genre: Indie rock
- Length: 24:58
- Language: English
- Label: Burger

Cherry Glazerr chronology
Papa Cremp (2013)	Haxel Princess (2014)	Apocalipstick (2017)

Haxel Princess is the first full-length studio album from American indie rock band Cherry Glazerr.

== Reception ==
Editors of AllMusic Guide scored this album 3.5 out of five stars, with critic Tim Sendra noting the band's "very laid-back and relaxed approach to their noisy, poppy, almost ramshackle garage punk" paired with how "Creevy has a wonderfully bored way of singing where she sounds like she's idly passing by a mike as she nonchalantly tells tales", recommending to listeners that the album is "definitely worth checking out if you like your guitar pop delivered in a decidedly off-kilter fashion". A staff review by John Gentile of Punknews also rated this release 3.5 out of five, opining that Creevy's vocals create "a cold, intriguing character that throughout the rest of the album, never really lets you inside, but keeps you interested". Writing for Consequence of Sound, Michael Madden rated this album a C+, noting the uneveness of the band's music: "When everything is operating smoothly, it works out great. When it’s not, their music is vague and a little presumptuous."

Reviews for the band's follow-up Apocalipstick have noted how the group's sound matured in the interim, with Pitchfork Media's Quinn Moreland characterizing this release as "full of goofy and relatable teenage dispatches".

== Track listing ==
1. "Cry Baby" – 3:03
2. "Grilled Cheese" – 2:09
3. "Haxel Princess" – 2:42
4. "Glenn the Dawgg" – 1:39
5. "All My Friends" – 2:07
6. "Bloody Bandaid" – 3:54
7. "Sweaty Faces" – 2:22
8. "Teenage Girl" – 1:45
9. "White's Not My Color This Evening" – 3:09
10. "Trick or Treat Dancefloor" – 2:15

== Personnel ==
Cherry Glazerr

- Clementine Creevy – guitar, vocals, organ
- Sophia Muller – vocals
- Sean Redman – bass guitar
- Hannah Uribe – drums, percussion

Additional personnel

- Joel Jerome – percussion, recording engineering
- Lucy Miyaki – drums, percussion

== See also ==
- List of 2014 albums
