= Crash The Calm =

American post-hardcore band

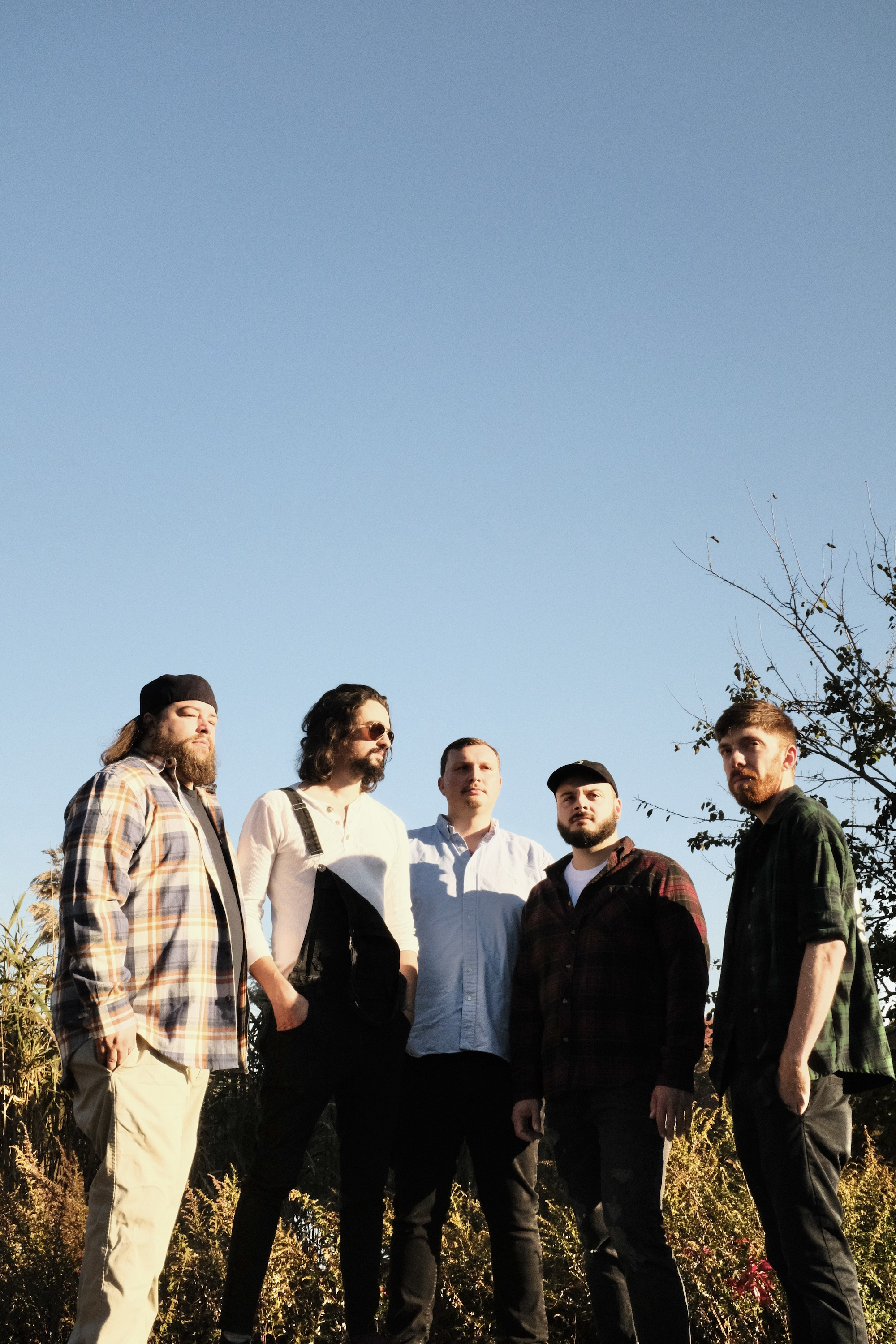
- From Left to Right: Pat Smith, James Cadolino, Dan LeBrun, Dave Van Nostrand, John Potocnik

Background information
- Origin: Long Island, New York, United States
- Genres: Emo, Alternative Rock, Post-Hardcore, Indie Rock, Grunge
- Years active: 2014-present
- Label: Unsigned
- Members: Pat Smith; John Potocnik; Dave Van Nostrand; Dan LeBrun; James Cadolino
- Past members: Brian Dowling; Ryan Sweeney; Connor Holzmann; Matt Bodt

Crash The Calm is an American post-hardcore band from Long Island, New York, United States.

== Background and debut release ==
Crash The Calm was formed in late 2014. After releasing their debut single "Holes"- produced by Phil Douglas of Iron Chic and Latterman in 2015- the band steadily performed and toured throughout the year before catching the eye of Long Island-based Downport Records. The band began recording their debut full length at VuDu Studios with Mike Watts, Nick Starrantino and Dom Nastasi. How've You Been? was released on May 19, 2017. The band then released a split with Long Island Post-Hardcore band Staleworth on August 10, 2018, also on Downport Records.

== A Town Named Nowhere (LP) ==
The band entered the studio again in May 2019 at Westfall Recordings with Anthony Lopardo and Ray Marte for their follow up release. In October 2020, they released the single "Devils" and announced the upcoming LP A Town Named Nowhere, a concept record about a town during the dust bowl era in the United States. Brooklyn Vegan premiered the music video for the lead single, 'My Nowhere', directed by James Morano, on July 21, 2021, calling it "...a cross between the heavier Manchester Orchestra songs and Balance and Composure." The band says that it is "a song about being addicted to your own tragedy". The first EP, Volume I of A Town Named Nowhere was released on digital streaming platforms July 23, 2021, containing the tracks 'Spring '31', 'Dust & Dirt', 'Devils', and 'My Nowhere'.

== Lifeless Sounds (EP) ==
After parting ways with their original vocalist, the band returned to the studio in 2023 with a new singer, this time self-recording and producing. The EP is due early 2025, featuring the singles “Rope” and “Sleep on the Floor”.

== Discography ==
- 2017: How've You Been? (LP)
- 2018: Split EP with Staleworth
- 2020: Devils (Single)
- 2021: A Town Named Nowhere: Volume I (EP)
- 2021: A Town Named Nowhere: Volume II (EP)
- 2021: A Town Named Nowhere: Volume III (EP)
- 2022: A Town Named Nowhere (LP)
- 2024: Rope (Single)
- 2024: Sleep On The Floor (Single)

== Band Members ==
Current members

- Pat Smith - Guitar (2014–present)
- John Potocnik - Drums (2019–present)
- Dan LeBrun - Guitar, Vocals (2019–present)
- Dave Van Nostrand - Bass (2020–present)
- James Cadolino- Vocals (2023–present)

Former members

- Brian Dowling - Vocals, Guitar (2014–2023)
- Connor Holzmann - Guitar (2014–2019)
- Ryan Sweeney - Bass (2014–2019)
- Matt Bodt - Drums (2014–2019)
