= Sasami (album) =

Studio album by Sasami
- Released: March 8, 2019
- Studio: Studio 22 (Los Angeles)
- Genre: Shoegazing
- Length: 40:08
- Label: Domino
- Producers: Sasami; Thomas Dolas; JooJoo Ashworth

Sasami chronology
Sasami (2019)	Squeeze (2022)

Singles from Sasami
- 1. "Not the Time" / "Callous" Released: October 9, 2018; 2. "Jealousy" Released: January 9, 2019; 3. "Free" Released: February 14, 2019

Sasami is the debut studio album by American singer-songwriter and musician Sasami, released on March 8, 2019, through Domino.

== Background and release ==
On April 3, 2018, Sasami shared her first solo track "Callous" on SoundCloud. On October 9, Domino Recording Company announced that Sasami had signed to their label, and officially released "Callous" alongside a new song titled "Not the Time", premiered by The Fader. The songs were released on a 7" vinyl on October 26. On January 9, Sasami released the third single, "Jealousy", and its music video, alongside an announcement of the album and a pre-order. A fourth single, "Free" featuring Devendra Banhart, was released on February 14, before the album was released on March 8 on Domino.

== Writing and recording ==
Sasami wrote the album while playing keyboards and guitar on tour with Cherry Glazerr, and shortly recorded it as a string of demos to her iPad. They were later recorded for the album in Studio 22, Los Angeles with Thomas Dolas and her brother JooJoo Ashworth. After the release of the first two singles, "Not the Time" and "Callous", Sasami stated, "I wrote both of these songs on tour on a guitar on my iPad with GarageBand plugins and Moog 15 app sounds and then re-recorded them in the studio onto tape with really great tones. So it's kind of like emotionally scribbling a letter on a tear and snot-stained napkin and then re-writing it on fancy papyrus paper to make it look like you have your shit together."

Sasami describes the album as "a mix of a diary and a collection of letters, written but never sent, to people I've been intimately involved with in one way or another."

== Reception ==
Professional ratings
Aggregate scores
Source	Rating
Metacritic	75/100
Review scores
Source	Rating
AllMusic	4/5 stars
DIY Mag	4/5 stars
Drowned in Sound	7/10
Exclaim	8/10
Pitchfork	7.0/10
The Line of Best Fit	8/10

Sasami was generally well received by professional critics upon its initial release. At Metacritic, which assigns a normalised score out of 100 to ratings from publications, the album received an average score of 75 based on 13 reviews, indicating "generally favorable reviews".

Reviewing the album for AllMusic, Tim Sendra concluded that "Sasami is really Ashworth's show and she proves more than up to the challenge, in the process making an album that while displaying clear influences adds enough of her own idiosyncratic skills and insights to make the record stand out from the crowd. Plus, it's full of great songs -- the kind that hit the poppy, hooky buttons hard while still getting in deep and touching the heart, too. It's a brilliant debut and immediately vaults Ashworth and Sasami to the head of the class of 2019." In the review for DIY Mag, Rachel Finn proclaimed that "As a body of work, it sounds eerie and complex while still remaining delicate and cohesive and it’s a bold and well-rounded debut." Jasper Williems review for Drowned in Sound gave a more lukewarm opinion of the album, stating that "Because of its barren lyricism and jarring sonic contrasts SASAMI often a daunting, impenetrable listen, and any attempt to understand feels like an intrusion of a hermetically sealed space."

Pitchfork contributor Sophie Kemp had some reservations about the album, despite providing an overall positive assessment of it; "Listening to Ashworth unpack her relationships can verge on voyeurism. Writing about sadness and suffering is difficult to do, especially in the space of a debut album, when you are still figuring out what to say and how to say it. But dig beneath the surface of her songs, and the bitter secrets she has buried there bloom. Sometimes Ashworth sounds like she’s yearning to startle her own music’s hypnotically pleasant surface, and there are times you wonder if the gauziness of shoegaze is doing her a disservice, hiding her in plain sight."

== Track listing ==
All tracks are written by Sasami Ashworth.

No.	Title	Length
1.	"I Was a Window" (featuring Dustin Payseur)	3:34
2.	"Not the Time"	2:50
3.	"Morning Comes"	4:23
4.	"Free" (featuring Devendra Banhart)	4:30
5.	"Pacify My Heart"	4:49
6.	"At Hollywood"	2:32
7.	"Jealousy"	3:36
8.	"Callous"	5:04
9.	"Adult Contemporary" (featuring Soko)	3:51
10.	"Turned Out I Was Everyone"	4:59
Total length:		40:08

== Release history ==
Region	Date	Label	Format	Ref.
Various	March 8, 2019	Domino	LP; CD; digital download	
