= Apocalipstick (album) =

Studio album by Cherry Glazerr
- Released: January 20, 2017
- Genre: Indie rock; hard rock
- Length: 34:34
- Label: Secretly Canadian
- Producer: Joe Chiccarelli; Carlos de la Garza

Cherry Glazerr chronology
Haxel Princess (2014)	Apocalipstick (2017)	Houses of the Holy, Vol. 1 (2018)

Apocalipstick is the second studio album by American indie rock band Cherry Glazerr, released on January 20, 2017. The band worked on the album with producers Joe Chiccarelli and Carlos de la Garza, making their garage sound more polished. This album was said by AllMusic to have a '90s vibe and a sound influenced by indie bands. Frontwoman Clem Creevy joined up with keyboardist Sasami Ashworth and drummer Tabor Allen for the making of their major label debut.

== Accolades ==
Publication	Accolade	Year	Rank	Ref.
Drowned in Sound	Favourite Albums of 2017	2017	80	

Apocalipstick was released to overall critical approval: it was described by Pitchfork as the band's "fiercest recording yet, full of shredding jams, furious howls, and self-aware swagger", and its lead single "I Told You I'd Be With The Guys" as a "tremendous indie rock tune powerful enough to restore your faith in the genre' by The Guardian. Tom Ewing of Freaky Trigger called it "[s]waggering teenage hard rock".

At Metacritic, which assigns a normalized rating out of 100 to reviews from mainstream publications, Apocalipstick received an average score of 76, indicating "generally favorable reviews".

== Track listing ==
All tracks are written by Clementine Creevy; "Trash People" and "Sip O' Poison" co-written by Sean Redman.

No.	Title	Length
1.	"Told You I'd Be with the Guys"	4:35
2.	"Trash People"	3:09
3.	"Moon Dust"	2:36
4.	"Humble Pro"	2:44
5.	"Nuclear Bomb"	3:46
6.	"Only Kid On the Block"	3:45
7.	"Lucid Dreams"	3:42
8.	"Sip O' Poison"	2:22
9.	"Nurse Ratched"	3:02
10.	"Instagratification"	2:45
11.	"Apocalipstick"	2:05
Total length:		34:34

== Personnel ==
Cherry Glazerr

- Tabor Allen – drums, percussion
- Sasami Ashworth – keyboards, vocals, guitar
- Clementine Creevy – guitar, vocals
- Sean Redman – bass

Additional contributors

- Joe Chiccarelli – production
- Carlos de la Garza – production
- Malachi Ward – album art
