= I Don't Want You Anymore =

Studio album by Cherry Glazerr
- Released: September 29, 2023
- Genre: Indie rock
- Length: 36:29
- Label: Secretly Canadian
- Producer: Clementine Creevy; Jonny Pierce; Yves Rothman; Sammy Witte

Cherry Glazerr chronology
Stuffed & Ready (2019)	I Don't Want You Anymore (2023)

You know, I don't really think about that stuff that much, honestly. I'm excited that it made the rounds and that it's being heard by more people who can connect to it. And who it can touch. All I want, as an artist, is to make things that mean something to other people. So as many people as it can reach is good for me.

—Clementine Creevy on positive critical reception for I Don't Want You Anymore

I Don't Want You Anymore is the fourth studio album by American indie rock band Cherry Glazerr, released on September 29, 2023 through Secretly Canadian.

== Recording and release ==
The album was preceded by the singles "Soft Like a Flower", "Ready for You", and "Sugar".

== Reception ==
Alternative Press' Anna Zanes wrote that this album "leans further into rock than ever before, without losing touch with Creevy's emotional candidness — rather, on this album, she easily embraces the wonderfully unsettling depths of the human psyche, in real time". Critics at All Songs Considered chose this as one of the five best albums of the week. In Paste, Victoria Wasylak scored this album 8.3 out of 10, writing that it "successfully embodies the private suffering that precedes any semblance of healing". Sophia June of Pitchfork scored this work a 7.1 out of 10, praising the lyrics and production, but stating that some of genre exploration fails and song in the first half "fall... flat when Creevy opts for bubbly, optimistic indie pop". Prior to release, the single "Ready for You" was chosen as a Song of the Week at Under the Radar and "Golden" was picked as one of the songs of the week. The publication published a review by Matt the Raven scoring the album an 8.5 out of 10, summing up that it "is destined to be your new guilty pleasure as the superb vocals and ultra-cool textures of these robust and vibrant tunes creep into your consciousness and stay playing in your head long after the album is over".

PopMatters ranked this the 19th best rock album of 2023. At Under the Radar, this was rated the 66th best album of 2023.

== Track listing ==
All tracks are written by Clementine Creevy and Yves Rothman, except where noted.

1. "Addicted to Your Love" – 1:44
2. "Bad Habit" (Creevy, Rothman, Jacques Greene, Jerome Potter) – 2:48
3. "Ready for You" (Creevy, Rothman, Sammy Witte) – 3:01
4. "Touched You with My Chaos" – 4:23
5. "Soft Like a Flower" – 3:16
6. "Sugar" (Creevy, Rothman, Jonathan Pierce, Suzy Shinn) – 3:20
7. "Golden" (Creevy, Rothman, Spencer Hartling, Kieran Hebden, Sami Perez) – 3:14
8. "Wild Times" (Creevy, Rothman, Joe Kennedy) – 4:18
9. "Eat You Like a Pill" (Creevy, Rothman, Tabor Allen) – 3:39
10. "Shattered" – 3:16
11. "I Don't Want You Anymore" – 3:29

== Personnel ==
Cherry Glazerr

- Clementine Creevy – bass guitar, guitar, synthesizer, vocals (all tracks); production (tracks 2, 4–7)
- Sami Perez – bass guitar, backing vocals

Additional personnel

- Mike Bozzi – mastering
- Jonny Chais – trumpet
- Omeka E.O. – strings
- Ross Garfield – technician
- Joe Kennedy – synthesizer
- Jesse Newport – engineering
- Jonny Pierce – production (6)
- Jesse Quebbeman-Turley – drums
- Lawrence Rothman – mixing
- Yves Rothman – bass guitar, synthesizer, programming, production, engineering
- Jake Supple – engineering
- Clint Welander – assistance
- Sammy Witte – production (3)

== See also ==
- 2023 in American music
- List of 2023 albums
