= Jabari Asim =

American professor and writer (born 1962)

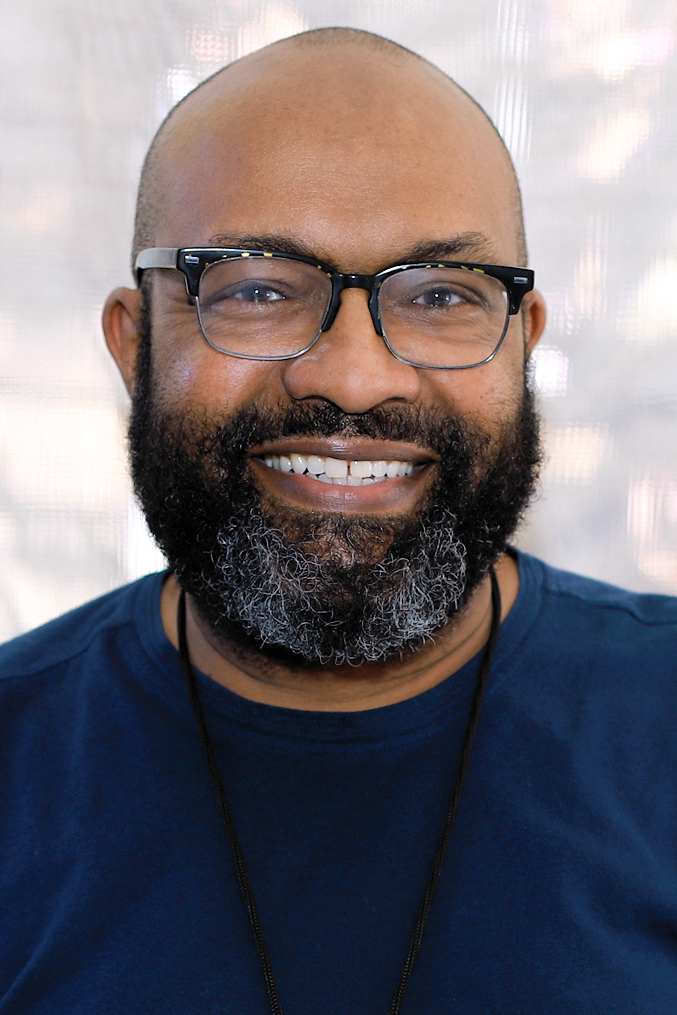
- Asim at the 2022 Texas Book Festival.
- Born: August 11, 1962 (age 64); St. Louis, Missouri, U.S.
- Education: Northwestern University
- Occupations: Professor; editor; author; poet; playwright
- Employer: Emerson College
- Children: G'Ra Asim
- Writing career
- Genre: African-American literature
- Notable works: The N Word: Who Can Say It, Who Shouldn't, and Why (2007); What Obama Means (2009)

Jabari Asim (born August 11, 1962) is an American author, poet, playwright, and professor of writing, literature and publishing at Emerson College in Boston, Massachusetts. He is the former editor-in-chief of The Crisis magazine, a journal of politics, ideas and culture published by the NAACP and founded by historian and social activist W. E. B. Du Bois in 1910.

In February 2019, Asim was named Emerson College's inaugural Elma Lewis '43 Distinguished Fellow in the Social Justice Center. In September 2022, he was named Emerson College Distinguished Professor of Multidisciplinary Letters.

== Life and career ==
Asim was born in St. Louis, Missouri, in 1962. He attended public schools there before studying at Northwestern University.

In welcoming Asim to The Crisis in August 2007, then-publisher Roger Wilkins said: "Mr. Asim is a seasoned editor, a fine writer and author of a new best selling book. He is a gentleman devoted to the cause of racial justice, is excited about his new role with the NAACP and we are energized by his joining our ranks."

Asim was chosen by the National Book Foundation to serve on the nonfiction panel for the 2013 National Book Awards. Harold Augenbraum, executive director of the foundation, "lauded Asim's ability to approach difficult topics with humility".

In April 2009, the John Simon Guggenheim Memorial Foundation awarded Asim a fellowship in nonfiction, one of 180 awarded to artists, scientists and scholars selected from a group of almost 3,000 applicants.

From 2008 to 2010, Asim was scholar-in-residence in African-American Studies and in the Department of Journalism at the University of Illinois at Urbana–Champaign.

Asim spent eleven years (1996–2007) at The Washington Post as deputy editor of the book review section, children's book editor, poetry editor, and editor of the Washington Post's Education Review. For three years, he also wrote a Washington Post Writers Group syndicated column on political and social issues for the Post. Asim is a former vice president of the National Book Critics Circle.

Prior to his stint at The Washington Post Book World, Asim was book editor of the St. Louis Post-Dispatch, during which time he was the only Africanbeing copy editor of the daily editorial and commentary pages, and arts editor of the weekend section.

In June 2026, he was awarded an honorary Doctor of Letters degree by Wheaton College in Massachusetts.

=== Personal life ===
Asim lives near Boston, Massachusetts, with his wife and children. He is the father of G'Ra Asim, a writer, musician, and assistant professor of Creative Writing at Washington University in St. Louis.

== Literary career ==
=== Nonfiction ===
Jabari Asim is the author of several nonfiction books. We Can't Breathe: On Black Lives, White Lies and the Art of Survival (2018), a collection of essays, was named a finalist for the PEN/Diamonstein-Spielvogel Award for the Art of the Essay in 2018.

The N Word: Who Can Say It, Who Shouldn't, and Why was short-listed for the Hurston/Wright Legacy Award in 2008.

=== Fiction ===
Asim's debut work of fiction, A Taste of Honey (2009), is a collection of 16 connected stories told from multiple perspectives, which take place in a fictional Midwestern town called Gateway in 1968. The book was featured in the March 2010 issue of Essence magazine. Go On Girl! Book Club selected A Taste of Honey for its 2011 Reading List for May. In January 2011, A Taste of Honey was nominated for Outstanding Literary Work – Fiction, 42nd NAACP Image Awards.

Asim's debut novel, Only the Strong, was published May 12, 2015. His second novel, Yonder, was published January 11, 2022. The New York Times included it in its list of the 100 Notable Books of the Year. Yonder was designated an Honor Book by the Black Caucus of the American Library Association.

=== Poetry ===
Asim's poetry has been published in African American Writers: A Literary Reader, as well as in the anthologies Role Call: A Generational Anthology of Social & Political Black Literature & Art (eds Tony Medina, Samiya Bashir and Quraysh Ali Lansana, 2002), Beyond The Frontier: African-American Poetry for the 21st Century (ed. E. Ethelbert Miller, 2002), Herb Boyd's The Harlem Reader: A Celebration of New York's Most Famous Neighborhood from the Renaissance Years to the 21st Century (2003), From the Black Arts Movement to Furious Flower: A Collection of Contemporary African American Poetry (ed. Joanne V. Gabbin, 2004), Resisting Arrest: Poems to Stretch the Sky (ed. Tony Medina, 2015), Best American Poetry 2021 (eds. David Lehman and Tracy K. Smith, 2021), The Pushcart Prize XLVI: Best of the Small Presses 2022 (ed. Bill Henderson, 2022), This Is The Honey: An Anthology of Contemporary Black Poets (ed. Kwame Alexander, 2024), and Poemhood: Our Black Revival (ed. Amber McBride, et al., 2024).

His first collection, Stop and Frisk, was published June 15, 2020.

=== Children's books ===
The Road To Freedom, Asim's first novel for young readers, was published in 2000.

Fifty Cents and a Dream: Young Booker T. Washington (2012) was on the School Library Journal 2012 Editor's Choice List, a Kirkus Best Children's Books List Selection, the Fall 2012 Parent's Choice Silver Award Winner, and an NAACP Image Award nominee. It won the Carter G. Woodson Book Award in 2013.

Preaching to the Chickens: The Story of Young John Lewis (2016) was named a New York Times Best Illustrated Children's Book of 2016.

== Bibliography ==
=== Nonfiction ===
- Not Guilty: Twelve Black Men Speak Out on the Law, Justice and Life (editor, HarperCollins, 2001)
- The N Word: Who Can Say It, Who Shouldn't, and Why (Houghton Mifflin Harcourt, 2007)
- What Obama Means: ...For Our Culture, Our Politics, Our Future (William Morrow, 2009)
- We Can't Breathe: On Black Lives, White Lies, and the Art of Survival (Picador, 2018)

==== In collections ====
- "What Is This New Thing?" The Furious Flowering of African-American Poetry (ed. Joanne V. Gabbin, University of Virginia Press, 1999)
- "Angles of Vision", Step Into A World: A Global Anthology of The New Black Literature (ed. Kevin Powell, Wiley, 2000)
- "Don't Shy Away from Books about Tough Issues", Can I Teach That? Negotiating Taboo Language and Controversial Topics in the Classroom (ed. Suzanne Linder and Elizabeth Majerus, Rowman & Littlefield, 2016)
- "You Can Do It", We Rise, We Resist, We Raise Our Voices, ed. Wade Hudson and Cheryl Willis Hudson (Crown Books for Young Readers, 2018)
- "Getting it Twisted", Best American Essays 2019, ed. Rebecca Solnit (Mariner Press, 2019)
- "Some Call It God", Best American Poetry 2021, ed. Tracy K. Smith (Scribner, 2021)

=== Fiction ===
- A Taste of Honey: Stories (Broadway Books, 2009)
- Only the Strong (Agate Bolden, 2015)
- Yonder (Simon & Schuster, 2022)

=== Poetry ===
- Stop and Frisk: American Poems (Bloomsday, 2020)

=== Children's ===
- The Road to Freedom: A Story of the Reconstruction (Jamestown Publishers, 2000)
- Jamestown's American Portraits: The Road to Freedom (McGraw-Hill, 2001)
- Daddy Goes to Work (Little Brown, 2006)
- Whose Knees Are These? (LittleBrown Kids, 2006)
- Whose Toes Are Those? (Little Brown Kids, 2006)
- Boy of Mine (Little Brown Kids, 2009)
- Girl of Mine (Little Brown Kids, 2009)
- Fifty Cents and a Dream: Young Booker T. Washington (Little Brown Books for Young Readers, 2012)
- Preaching to the Chickens: The Story of Young John Lewis (Nancy Paulsen Books, 2016)
- A Child's Introduction to African American History: The Experience, People, and Events That Shaped Our Country (Black Dog & Leventhal, 2018)
- My Baby Loves Christmas (HarperFestival, 2019)
- My Baby Loves Valentine's Day (HarperFestival, 2020)
- My Baby Loves Halloween (HarperFestival, 2020)
- Mighty Justice (Young Readers' Edition): The Untold Story of Civil Rights Trailblazer Dovey Johnson Roundtree; by Dovey Johnson Roundtree and Katie McCabe, adapted by Jabari Asim (Roaring Brook Press, 2020)
- Me And Muhammad Ali(Nancy Paulsen Books, 2022)
- A Child's Introduction to Jazz: The Musicians, Culture, and Roots of the World's Coolest Music (Black Dog & Leventhal, 2022)

=== Translations ===
- Em Algum Lugar La Fora, translated by Rogerio W. Galindo 2023

=== Critical studies and reviews of Asim's work ===
Yonder

- Lawson, Evangeline (February 4, 2022), "'Yonder' is a vital addition to our literature about slavery". The Washington Post.
- Riley, Vanessa (January 30, 2022), "In 'Yonder,' Escape From Slavery Comes With a Magical Twist". Sunday Book Review. The New York Times.

The N Word

- Bernard, Emily (Summer 2007), "Hard Word". The Wilson Quarterly.
- Kaplan, Erin Aubry (April 1, 2007), "Six Letters That Provoke". Los Angeles Times.
- Wellington, Darryl Lorenzo (Winter 2008), "History, Amnesia, and the N Word". Dissent.

=== Television appearances ===
In 2007, Asim appeared on Tavis Smiley to discuss The N Word: Who Can Say It, Who Shouldn't, and Why.

In 2007, Asim appeared on The Colbert Report to discuss The N Word: Who Can Say It, Who Shouldn't, and Why.

In 2009, Asim appeared on The Colbert Report to discuss What Obama Means.

In 2019, Asim appeared on Greater Boston to discuss We Can’t Breathe.

In 2020, Asim appeared on Greater Boston to discuss the murder of George Floyd.
