= The Constant One =

Studio album by Iron Chic
- Released: November 5, 2013
- Recorded: 2012–2013
- Studio: Hobo House
- Genre: Pop punk, punk rock
- Length: 38:38
- Label: Bridge 9 Records
- Producer: Phil Douglas

Iron Chic chronology
Not Like This (2010)	The Constant One (2013)	You Can't Stay Here (2017)

The Constant One is the second studio album by Long Island, New York punk rock band Iron Chic. This album marks the band's first release on Bridge 9 Records. The band recorded the album in guitarist Phil Douglas' Hobo House studio.

== Background ==
After 3 years of on and off touring in support of Not Like This and releasing the Split 'N Shit and Spooky Action EP's (the title track off the latter was re-recorded for The Constant One), Bridge Nine Records expressed interest in signing the band in which the band decided to officially start writing their follow up. The album is notable in being more optimistic in tone than its predecessor while also featuring slower and mid tempo songs such as the aforementioned "Spooky Action (At A Distance)" and the introspective "(Castle) Numbskull" as well as more observational and personal lyrics. Lubrano explained "This record is a lot more about people's relationships with each other on a personal level. I don't know the word I'm looking for. It was more about the way people relate to each other, rather than my personal past life experiences, or something like that....I guess there were a lot of little things that I wanted to touch upon for my own edification." The band wrote and recorded the album over a span of a year and a half at Douglas' Hobo House and officially released it on November 5, 2013. The album title is a reference to the Hellblazer comic books by Peter Milligan.

== Reception ==
The album was well received upon release. Pitchfork awarded the band a 7.9 out of 10, stating "The Constant One is a rare time where you can say “it leaves nothing to the imagination” as a compliment. Or, to frame it another way, Iron Chic are holding nothing back and do their damnedest to make you feel less alone if you happen to be in the parts of the country they haven't reached yet." Punknews.Org gave the band 4 out of 5 stars while explaining that "Despite the litany of causal advice, a singular message echoes throughout: you are not alone. The Constant One, as a sentiment, is a statement on the cyclical nature of our humanity; as a commentary, it attempts to diffuse the fears and anxieties, the failures and disappointments that perpetually threaten to debilitate us. And the conclusion: it's all bullshit. The human condition is greater than the sum of its experiences. As Lubrano reminds us, "We're here alive/ there's still time to fuck up now." I don't know a more life affirming, reckless and comforting disposition." The album holds a 4.12 out of 5 rating on Rate Your Music.

== Track listing ==
All music written by Iron Chic.

No.	Title	Length
1.	"The End (Intro)?"	1:13
2.	"Bogus Journey"	3:58
3.	"(Castle) Numbskull"	3:40
4.	"Wolf Dix Rd."	3:59
5.	"Prototypes"	2:26
6.	"Spooky Action (At A Distance)"	4:54
7.	"Sounds Like A Pretty Brutal Murder"	3:19
8.	"A Serious House On A Serious Earth"	4:15
9.	"True Miserable Experience"	2:47
10.	"Don't Drive Angry"	3:49
11.	"What Ever Happened To The Man Of Tomorrow?"	4:08

== Personnel ==
- Jason Lubrano - Vocals
- Phil Douglas- Guitars, Vocals, Production
- Rob McAllister - Guitar
- Mike Bruno- Bass
- Gordon Lafler- Drums
