= Squeeze (Sasami album) =

Studio album by Sasami
- Released: February 25, 2022
- Studios: Log Mansion, Los Angeles, CA, USA
- Genres: Indie rock; nu metal; industrial
- Length: 32:02
- Label: Domino
- Producers: Sasami Ashworth, Kyle Thomas

Sasami chronology
Sasami (2019)	Squeeze (2022)	Blood on the Silver Screen (2025)

Squeeze is the second studio album by American musician Sasami, released on February 25, 2022, by Domino Recording Company. The album marks a transition from the singer-songwriter style of Sasami's debut album to a harder rock sound that incorporates heavy metal and industrial influences. Rolling Stone, Consequence of Sound, and The A.V. Club all named Squeeze as one of the best albums of 2022.

== Background ==
In an interview for The New York Times, Sasami described Squeeze as an attempt to "appropriate white, male music... There is room for someone like me to come in and make a mess in it." In an interview for NPR, Sasami described her interest in using nu metal sounds to address the "pent-up frustration and disillusionment" faced by marginalized audiences. The album's mood was inspired by the COVID-19 pandemic, with Sasami stating that she could have reacted to the crisis with uplifting songs, but decided instead to lean "deeper into the element of frustration, anger, and rage."

The album cover was designed Andrew Thomas Huang and Rin Kim. The snake-like imagery was inspired by Nure-onna, a Japanese folk creature. When writing the album, Sasami drew upon a version of the Nure-onna story in which the creature "entices passersby and, depending on whether she judges them to be a good person or not, either lets them go without incident or drains their blood."

Squeeze was written and recorded mostly at the Log Mansion studio in Los Angeles. The album features numerous collaborations, including appearances by Hand Habits and King Tuff, and several drum and percussion performances by Ty Segall, who co-produced five songs. The album also features contributions from heavy metal drummer Dirk Verbeuren, jazz drummer Jay Bellerose, and the experimental artist No Home.

== Critical reception ==
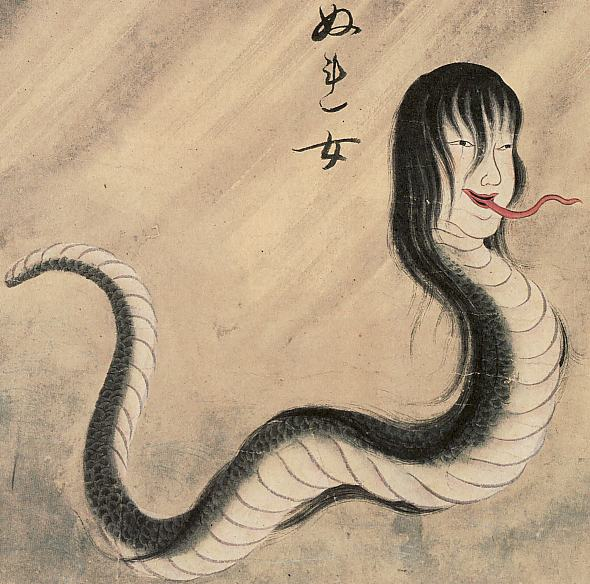
Nure-onna (ぬれ女) from the Hyakkai-Zukan by Sawaki Suushi. Sasami drew inspiration from this Japanese folk legend for Squeeze.

Upon its release, the album received generally positive reviews but with some dissenters. Consequence of Sound called Squeeze "a daunting feat other artists couldn’t even dream of attempting". Stereogum described the album as "an intriguing and invigorating play in contrasts" and a "showcase for Ashworth’s production skills." Pitchfork called the album's unique blend of genres "awfully fun" and noted its mastery of rock genres that were popular in the 1990s.

Paste Magazine focused on the heavy metal-oriented experiments and concluded that the album's slower songs are less exciting, but described the album overall as "the perfect soundtrack for punching a hole in the wall, or at least fantasizing about it." Loud and Quiet described the album as "full of eruptive contrasts and nuances that, for all the fireworks, are always true to [Sasami's] artistic vision."

The album's genre experiments were questioned by some reviewers. Tim Sendra of AllMusic gave the album a much less favorable review, describing its cover of Daniel Johnston's "Sorry Entertainer" as "a joke that never should have been told" and concluding that the album displays Sasami's interest in disparate genres but poor understanding of many of them. Under the Radar noted that the album "no doubt gets your attention, but can also make for a jarring experience." The Line of Best Fit noted that Squeeze demonstrates "Ashworth’s incredible musical talents, which deserve considerably more widespread recognition" but "it sometimes feels as though Ashworth is taking on more than the album can handle." According to Spectrum Culture, the album's "soundscape isn’t entirely original, but her emotions align with the genres’ ethos."

== Track listing ==
All tracks are written by Sasami Ashworth except where indicated.

No.	Title	Writer(s)	Length
1.	"Skin a Rat"		2:41
2.	"The Greatest"		3:20
3.	"Say It"		3:35
4.	"Call Me Home"	Kyle Thomas	3:46
5.	"Need It to Work"		3:15
6.	"Tried to Understand"		2:47
7.	"Make It Right"		2:33
8.	"Sorry Entertainer"	Daniel Johnston	2:51
9.	"Squeeze"	Charlotte Valentine	1:50
10.	"Feminine Water Turmoil"		1:33
11.	"Not a Love Song"	Kyle Thomas	3:54
Total length:			32:02

Japanese edition (bonus track)
No.	Title	Writer(s)	Length
12.	"Toxicity" (Live)	Daron Malakian, Shavo Odadjian, Serj Tankian	3:46
Total length:			36:00
