= Wheel (album) =

Studio album by Laura Stevenson
- Released: April 23, 2013
- Recorded: Fall 2012
- Studios: Marcata Recording, New Paltz, New York
- Genre: Folk
- Length: 46:10
- Label: Don Giovanni
- Producer: Kevin McMahon

Laura Stevenson chronology
Sit Resist (2011)	Wheel (2013)	Cocksure (2015)

Wheel is the third album by American singer-songwriter Laura Stevenson, and the first to be credited solely to her. The album was released through Don Giovanni Records on April 23, 2013.

== Background and recording ==
Stevenson stated that the album's tracks were written in "various states of depression" and that she had a "tormented" time recording the album. She said: "The recording process, I really struggled with it, so I put it away. And then, everybody was like, 'Oh, you’re gonna get a Pitchfork review and this is gonna be so cool.' So I was like, 'Oh, okay.' Then my hopes got really high that things were going to get easier for me, like I was gonna get a little bump and that was going to be helpful. Then that didn’t happen and it was the same slog, which is fine now, in retrospect. But when it came out, I got super disappointed afterwards and then I just tucked that record away. I mean, I still played the songs, but I never really listened to it."

== Critical reception ==
Professional ratings
Aggregate scores
Source	Rating
Metacritic	81/100
Review scores
Source	Rating
Pitchfork	6.2/10
PopMatters	9/10
Punknews.org	4.5/5
Sputnikmusic	5/5

Laura Snapes, for Pitchfork, wrote: "The thick arrangements and too-poignant string interludes often make Stevenson’s lyrics difficult to hear properly, and their tendency toward generic twang and climax gets old quickly. Wheel is accomplished, but does next to nothing you haven’t heard before and offers no original thrills. It's no means an unpleasant record, however, and Stevenson is a winsome presence with a wild voice, and an occasional knack for compellingly weird hybrids."

== Track listing ==
1. Renée
2. Triangle
3. Runner
4. Every Tense
5. Bells & Whistles
6. Sink, Swim
7. The Hole
8. Eleonora
9. The Move
10. Journey to the Center of the Earth
11. Telluride
12. L-Dopa
13. The Wheel
