= Michael Campbell (disambiguation) =

Michael Campbell (born 1969) is a New Zealand golfer.

Michael Campbell may also refer to:

== Music ==
- Michael Campbell (American musician, born 1985), American guitarist and member of bands Latterman, Kudrow, Laura Stevenson and the Cans, and The Brass
- Michael Campbell (musician and actor) (1946–2021), American musician and actor
- Michael Campbell (pianist and author) (born 1945), American pianist, teacher and textbook author
- Mike Campbell (musician) (born 1950), American guitarist for Tom Petty and the Heartbreakers
- Michael Campbell, known as Mikey Dread (1954–2008), Jamaican singer, producer, and broadcaster
- Michael Campbell, member of British band Courteeners

== Sports ==
- Mike Campbell (American football, born 1922) (1922–1998), American football coach
- Mike Campbell (running back) (born 1945), American football player
- Michael Campbell (sprinter) (born 1978), Jamaican track and field sprinter
- Michael Campbell (gridiron football) (born 1989), American football wide receiver
- Mike Campbell (first baseman) (1850–1926), Irish baseball player
- Mike Campbell (pitcher) (1964–2025), American baseball pitcher
- Mike Campbell (Canadian football) (born 1965), Canadian football player
- Mike Campbell-Lamerton (1933–2005), British Army and rugby union official
- Michael Campbell (basketball) (born 1975), American basketball player
- Mike Colin Campbell (born 1943), English high jumper

== Other people ==
- Michael Campbell (bishop) (born 1941), British bishop
- Michael W. Campbell (born 1978), Seventh-day Adventist historian and educator
- Mike Campbell (farmer) (1932–2011), Zimbabwean farmer who sued the government to keep his land
- Michael Che (born 1983) as Michael Che Campbell, American actor and comedian
- Mike Campbell, a character in Hemingway's 1926 novel The Sun Also Rises

== See also ==
- Mike Campbell (Pvt) Ltd v Zimbabwe, a 2008 case brought by white farmers against the Zimbabwean government regarding their land reform policy
