= The Buttertones =

American rock band

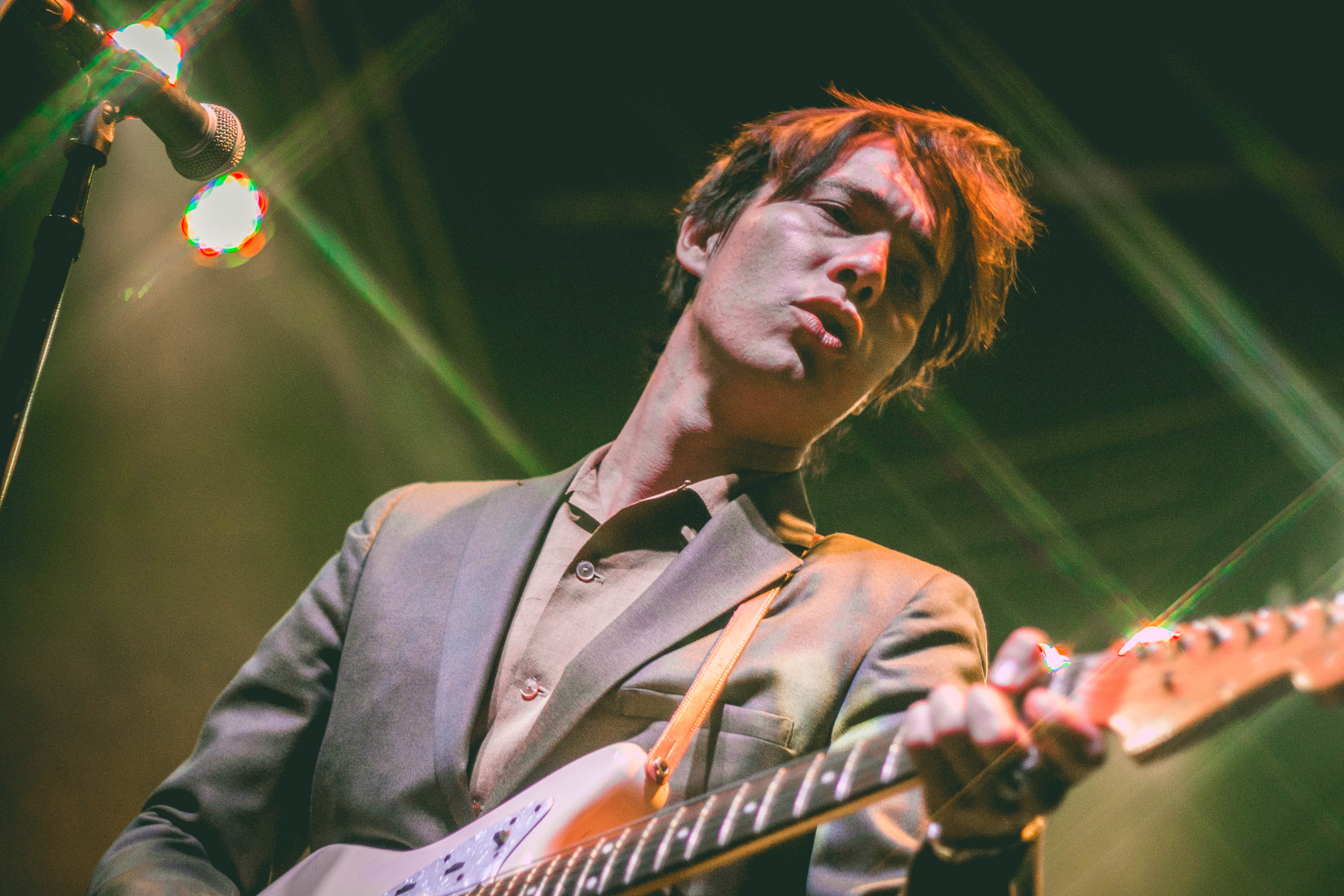

Background information
- Origin: Los Angeles, California, United States
- Genres: Indie rock; garage rock; surf rock; post punk
- Years active: 2012–2020; 2022–present
- Labels: Lolipop; Innovative Leisure; Ineffable
- Members: Richard Araiza; Karly Low; Brandon Gold; Carlos Sánchez
- Past members: Dakota Böttcher; Sean Redman; London Guzmán; Modesto Cobián; Mimi Pretends
- Website: www.thebuttertones.com

The Buttertones are an American rock band from Los Angeles, California. Formed in 2012, the band currently consists of Richard Araiza (lead vocals, guitar), Karly Low (bass), Brandon Gold (drums), and Carlos Sánchez (saxophone). Their music draws upon and straddles multiple genres, including surf rock, garage rock, doo-wop, and post-punk rock, and has been described as 'cinematic rock'.

== History ==
=== Formation and early years ===
The initial band formation consisted of Araiza, Redman and Cobián, who met at Musicians Institute in Hollywood in 2011. Bonding over their interest in mid-twentieth century music, they first began playing music together at Redman's Hollywood apartment. The band's name mirrors that of doo-wop groups such as The Cleftones, and reflects their attempt to seamlessly blend an array of sounds Their self-titled debut was "an eight-track effort steeped in expertly executed surf riffs and rolling percussion", released as a cassette on L.A.'s garage-pop Lolipop label in 2013.

The trio were subsequently joined by guitarist Dakota Böttcher and saxophonist London Guzmán (both from California), after which they self-released their second album, American Brunch, in 2015. Through their first two albums, The Buttertones principally cultivated a musical following in Los Angeles, playing 'practically every venue' and becoming 'a household name in the 20-something Echo Park/Silver Lake/Los Feliz crowd.'

Regarding musical influences on their sound the band have explained that "from the moment a sound speaks to us, we tend to integrate it into our music, as long as it's coherent with a whole. We don't really have sound aesthetics or stable influences. We don't care about labels."

=== Gravedigging (2017) ===
The Buttertones' third album, Gravedigging (and their debut for Innovative Leisure) was released on March 31, 2017. The album was recorded at Jazzcats studio in Long Beach in the spring of 2016, and was produced by Jonny Bell of Crystal Antlers. Gravedigging is the most collaborative of the band's albums, with songwriting and vocals from guitarist Dakota Böttcher on 'I Ran Away'.

The release of Gravedigging garnered the band an increase in publicity: "from a band who has so far threatened without actually nailing a bona fide tail on the donkey...Gravedigging might well be an early contender for soundtrack of the year." The album was met with generally positive reviews upon its release. It has been described as 'refreshing and innovative', 'stylish, dark, and a lot of fun', and as 'more of a series of cinematic vignettes than anything else...As each song has its own micro-theme, Araiza's voice seems to adopt a character to suit each song's story.'

=== Midnight in a Moonless Dream (2018) ===
The Buttertones released their fourth studio album, Midnight in a Moonless Dream, via Innovative Leisure on May 4, 2018. Recorded at Jazzcats Studio with Gravedigging producer Jonny Bell, the album reflects the band's attempt to craft a darker sound, to experiment vocally and instrumentally, and to step outside the surf rock genre. All songs on the album are sung by Richard Araiza, with the exception of "Don't Cry Alone", which is sung by Dakota Böttcher.

The album release was accompanied by an appearance at Coachella Music and Arts Festival, European and North American tours, and the release of a further single, "Madame Supreme", in October 2018.

=== Jazzhound, sexual assault allegations, and hiatus (2020) ===
The Buttertones began the year as opening act for The Reverend Horton Heat, and announced the release of their fifth album, Jazzhound, on April 10, 2020. The album was their first following the departure of guitarist Dakota Böttcher, with drummer Cobi switching instruments to take his place. A "reverb-soaked post-punk gem", Jazzhound was described by Ones to Watch as a "coming-of-age not defined by a particular generational shift...The Buttertones make the rare sort of music that simply does not go out of style."

On July 15, 2020, Clementine Creevy of Cherry Glazerr posted a statement on Instagram in which she accused Sean Redman of statutory rape and sexual misconduct: " I was 14 and he was 20...He also insisted on not using protection and gave me HPV. That was the first time I had sex." Creevy also made reference to having witnessed "a culture of predatory, misogynistic, and abusive behavior towards women by Sean, some of his bandmates in the Buttertones, and other men in their circle."

Creevy's statement became part of a wider movement against the sexual misconduct of artists and staff affiliated with Burger Records, and one which led to the downfall and closure of the record label. In response to Creevy's allegations, the band quickly cut ties with Redman, stating that "We do not condone Sean's behavior and he is no longer a member of The Buttertones". Label Innovative Leisure announced that it would be dropping the band immediately. Saxophonist London Guzman also stated that he was no longer a member of the band, leaving Richard and Cobi as the two remaining members.

=== Return, reformation, and Face to Face With Fantasy (2022–present) ===
The Buttertones returned to making music in 2022, sharing two new singles - 'Nite Time is my Time' and 'Angel Hands' - and announcing live shows in Anaheim, Las Vegas and Texas. Alongside Richard and Cobi, three new musicians had joined the band: Karly Low on bass, Brandon Gold on drums and Miriam Nissan on keyboard/guitar. Additionally, saxophonist Carlos Sánchez would join the band in mid-2023.

Released on October 27, 2024, the Buttertones’ newest album, Face to Face With Fantasy, included each of their previously released singles, along with several new songs.

== Members ==
Current

- Richard Araiza – lead vocals, guitars (2012–2020, 2022–present)
- Karly Low – bass, vocals (2022–present) (2022–present)
- Brandon Gold – drums, backing vocals (2022–present)
- Carlos Sánchez – tenor saxophone (2023–present)

Former

• Modeste Cobián – guitars (2020, 2022–2026), vocals (2012–2020, 2022–2026); drums (2012–2019), alto saxophone (2022)

- Dakota Böttcher – guitars, vocals (2014–2019)
- Sean Redman – bass, backing vocals (2012–2020)
- London Guzmán – tenor saxophone, keyboards (2015–2020)

Touring

- Grant Snyder – drums (2020)

== Discography ==
=== Studio albums ===
- Buttertones (2013)
- American Brunch (2015)
- Gravedigging (2017)
- Midnight in a Moonless Dream (2018)
- Jazzhound (2020)
- Face to Face With Fantasy (2024)

=== EPs ===
- For the Head and for the Feet (2015)

=== Singles ===
- "Stray Dog Strut"/"Shut Up Sugar" (2016)
- "Madame Supreme"/"Shut Out" (2018)
- "Nite Time is My Time" (2022)
- "Angel Hands" (2022)
- "Fingerwoman Found" (2024)
- "You're Gonna Die" (2024)
- "Awesome Monster" (2024)
- "Judy Do a Spin" (2024)
- "Chaos Reigns" (2024)
