= The Big Freeze (album) =

Studio album by Laura Stevenson
- Released: March 29, 2019
- Recorded: January 2018
- Genre: Indie folk
- Length: 33:57
- Label: Don Giovanni
- Producers: Joe Rogers; Laura Stevenson

Laura Stevenson chronology
Cocksure (2015)	The Big Freeze (2019)	Laura Stevenson (2021)

The Big Freeze is the fifth studio album by American singer-songwriter Laura Stevenson, released through Don Giovanni Records on March 29, 2019. It debuted on the Billboard charts at No. 11 Alternative New Artist Albums, No. 35 for Heatseekers Albums, and No. 41 for Current Alternative Albums.

== Music and lyrics ==
The album's music has been characterized as seeing Stevenson "trad[ing] her rougher punk edges for a much slower, smoother, more orchestral production." Paste said: "The Big Freeze trades the raucous guitars and bold hooks of her earlier work for subtler musical textures on songs that open into more expansive interior worlds. She relies more on her voice, which has both warmth and clarity in proportions that vary with the volume of she utilizes." The album's lyrics explore themes such as seclusion, family, codependency, dermatillomania, and loneliness.

== Critical reception ==
Professional ratings
Aggregate scores
Source	Rating
Metacritic	80/100
Review scores
Source	Rating
Exclaim!	7/10
Paste	7.6/10
Pitchfork	7.4/10
Punknews.org	3.5/5 stars
Sputnikmusic	5/5 stars

Hannah Siden of Exclaim! gave the album a score of 7 out of 10 and wrote: "The Big Freeze is an album that invites listeners to 'lay back, arms out' to experience its richness. It will perhaps be a surprising listen to fans expecting more upbeat material, but if you can surrender to the slower, weightier swells of this album, you might just find yourself floating." Nina Corcoran of Pitchfork gave the album a score of 7.4 and wrote: "A decade after making her solo debut, Stevenson has found her sweet spot as a singer-songwriter. The emotionally barbed storytelling, stripped-down delivery, and orchestral flair weave together symbiotically, a testament to how far Stevenson has come as a musical autodidact. Above all, it’s her voice that makes The Big Freeze such a raw, therapeutic listen."

Eric R. Danton of Paste gave the album a score of 7.6 out of 10, calling it "arguably Stevenson’s most adept album."

== Track listing ==
All tracks are written by Laura Stevenson.

No.	Title	Length
1.	"Lay Back, Arms Out"	3:42
2.	"Value Inn"	3:22
3.	"Living Room, NY"	2:36
4.	"Dermatillomania"	2:29
5.	"Hum"	3:32
6.	"Rattle at Will"	3:42
7.	"Hawks"	1:28
8.	"Big Deep"	3:33
9.	"Low Slow"	5:08
10.	"Perfect"	4:16
Total length:		33:57

== Personnel ==
Credits adapted from the album's liner notes.

- Laura Stevenson – guitar, piano, vocals, production
- Joe Rogers – recording, production, additional percussion
- D. James Goodwin – mixing, mastering, additional percussion
- Mike Campbell – bass guitar
- Aidan Koehler – violin
- Eleanor Norton – cello
- Joanna Sternberg – upright bass
- Christian Linsey – drums
- Kelly Pratt – trumpet, French horn
- Rachel Brennecke – photos
- Maxwell Stern – design, layout
