= Laura Stevenson (album) =

Studio album by Laura Stevenson
- Released: August 6, 2021
- Studio: The Building (Marlboro)
- Genre: Indie folk
- Length: 36:59
- Label: Don Giovanni
- Producer: John Agnello

Laura Stevenson chronology
The Big Freeze (2019)	Laura Stevenson (2021)

Professional ratings
Review scores
Source	Rating
Pitchfork	7.3/10

Laura Stevenson is the sixth album by American singer-songwriter Laura Stevenson, released through Don Giovanni Records on August 6, 2021.

== Track listing ==
All tracks are written by Laura Stevenson.

No.	Title	Length
1.	"State"	2:58
2.	"Don't Think About Me"	2:54
3.	"Moving Cars"	4:46
4.	"Continental Divide"	5:09
5.	"Wretch"	4:54
6.	"Sky Blue, Bad News"	4:44
7.	"Mary"	3:43
8.	"Sandstorm"	3:08
9.	"After Those Who Mean It"	2:30
10.	"Children's National Transfer"	2:09
Total length:		36:59

== Personnel ==
- Laura Stevenson – vocals, acoustic guitars, electric guitars, piano, Wurlitzer, Rhodes, full band arrangements
- Shawn Alpay – cello, string arrangements
- John Burdick – electric guitar
- Mike Campbell – bass guitar, full band arrangements, studio photo
- Sammi Niss – drums, percussion, full band arrangements
- Jeff Rosenstock – electric guitar
- John Agnello – production, engineering, mixing
- Greg Calbi – mastering
- Jeremy Delaney – mixing assistance
- Will Bryant – session assistance
- Kaitlin Van Pelt – cover painting
- Jamie Sheriff – photo editing
- John Yates – design
