= Sit Resist =

Studio album by Laura Stevenson & The Cans
- Released: April 26, 2011
- Recorded: Hunt Studio
- Length: 38:50
- Label: Don Giovanni Records

Laura Stevenson & The Cans chronology
A Record (2010)	Sit Resist (2011)	Wheel (2013)

Professional ratings
Review scores
Source	Rating
Punknews.org	4/5 stars

Sit Resist is the second album by American rock band Laura Stevenson & The Cans. The album was released by Don Giovanni Records in 2011.

== Critical reception and legacy ==
As a result of the 2020 reissue, Sit Resist garnered newfound retrospective acclaim. That year, Matt Wallock of American Songwriter praised it as a "superbly scrappy [and] heartfelt" album "that feels more vivid - and determined - with every listen."

Sit Resist was mentioned in BrooklynVegan's 10th anniversary retrospective covering post-hardcore music's "new wave" in 2011. It was recognized alongside various other albums released that year that would shift "from being [the genre's] 'new' wave to being as influential as the bands who inspired them".

== Track listing ==
No.	Title	Length
1.	"Halloween Pts. 1 & 2"	3:29
2.	"Master of Art"	3:57
3.	"Caretaker"	3:15
4.	"The Healthy One"	2:23
5.	"Finish Piece"	1:46
6.	"Peachy"	2:41
7.	"8:08"	3:51
8.	"Red Clay Roots"	1:37
9.	"Barnacles"	3:16
10.	"Montauk Monster"	4:01
11.	"The Wait"	3:32
12.	"The Weight"	1:42
13.	"I See Dark"	3:28
Total length:		38:50

== Personnel ==
Credits adapted from the record's Bandcamp page.

Laura Stevenson & the Cans

- Laura Stevenson - vocals, acoustic and electric guitars, piano, organ
- Peter Naddeo - electric guitar, glockenspiel
- Alex Billig - accordion, trumpet
- Mike Campbell - bass guitar
- Chris Parker - drums, percussion
