= Sputnikmusic =

Music review and news site

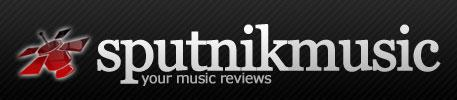
- Website type: Music website
- Available in: English
- Founded: 2005; 21 years ago
- Founder: Jeremy Ferwerda
- Website: sputnikmusic.com

Sputnikmusic (often shortened to simply Sputnik) is a music website that publishes music reviews and news entries. The site hosts both professional and amateur content, covering metal, punk, indie, rock, hip-hop, pop and other styles. Its reviews are used by the review aggregate Metacritic.

== Reception ==
Metacritic incorporates Sputnikmusic's staff reviews into its review aggregate ratings. The site was cited by The Guardian and Neil Daniels. Michael Miller wrote that "you're likely to fine [sic] a wide variety of opinions in the site". A Master's thesis utilized Sputnikmusic's music database for its research, due to its "focus on non-mainstream artists" and its "encompassing database". The ethnomusicologist Jorge Mercado Méndez references Sputnikmusic as an 'acclaimed' review source adjacent to Pitchfork, while musicologist Giuseppe Catani cites Sputnikmusic's Alex Robertson alongside the NME.

== Stratification and rating systems ==
On Sputnikmusic, there are four levels of reviewers, which differentiate professional and amateur content:

- Staff Reviewers: these are the editors who contribute to the professional section by producing analyses and reviews. Their reviews are referenced on Metacritic.
- Contributors: These writers are recognized by the moderators as good enough writers to be featured. Nevertheless, they are not taken into account by Metacritic or Wikipedia.
- Emeritus: Status given to former Staff members who no longer contribute to the site. Their reviews are considered professional.
- User: This category includes all other registered accounts who are not listed at a higher level. They can add new reviews, artists and albums to the database, as well as edit and submit reviews or lists. Their reviews can be upvoted or downvoted based on readers' perception of the review's quality. Reviews from writers in upper tiers do not include this feature.

The Sputnikmusic notation system is based on a 5-point system, starting at 1.0 and ending at 5.0 in 0.5 steps. Each note is associated with a word, ranging from "Awful" for 1.0 to "Classic" for 5.0. Staff members are also allowed to score in 0.1 steps. Each album analysis shows the score given by the reviewer, but also the score given by the other reviewers on an associated page where an average is calculated from all the scores. A bar chart also shows the number of ratings each score has received for each album.

== Album of the Year ==
Year	Artist	Album	Source
2006	Converge	No Heroes	
2007	Burial	Untrue	
2009	Animal Collective	Merriweather Post Pavilion	
2010	The Tallest Man on Earth	The Wild Hunt	
2011	Bon Iver	Bon Iver	
2012	Swans	The Seer	
2013	Julia Holter	Loud City Song	
2014	Flying Lotus	You're Dead!	
2015	Kendrick Lamar	To Pimp a Butterfly	
2016	David Bowie	Blackstar	
2017	The National	Sleep Well Beast	
2018	Kacey Musgraves	Golden Hour	
2019	Laura Stevenson	The Big Freeze	
2020	Charli XCX	How I'm Feeling Now	
2021	Mastodon	Hushed and Grim	
2022	Ethel Cain	Preacher's Daughter	
2023	JPEGMafia and Danny Brown	Scaring the Hoes	
2024	Charli XCX	Brat	
2025	Deafheaven	Lonely People with Power	
