= Phil Douglas (musician) =

American musician and producer

- Also known as: Phillip Winnipeg Douglas, Doug Bag, Dimebag Douglas, Phlub Douglas
- Origin: Huntington, New York, U.S.
- Genres: Rock, post-hardcore, pop punk
- Occupations: Musician, producer
- Instruments: Vocals; Guitar; Bass; Drums

Phil Douglas is an American musician and producer. He is best known for being one of the frontmen and guitarists of Latterman as well as the guitarist of Iron Chic. In 2015 Douglas reunited with his Latterman bandmates and formed Tender Defender.

== Musical career ==
=== Latterman and Tender Defender ===
Douglas formed Latterman with former Five Days Late bandmates Mattie Jo Canino and Dan Sposato as well as friend Pat Schramm. The group self-released two demos and their debut None of These Songs Are About Girls between 1999 and 2000. They released their first official album, Turn Up The Punk, We'll Be Singing on Traffic Violation Records in 2002 before signing with Deep Elm Records and releasing what's largely considered to be Latterman's magnum opus in No Matter Where We Go... in 2005 and releasing their final album We Are Still Alive the following year then breaking up in 2007. Since 2011 Latterman has had several one-off reunions and Douglas has since reunited with Canino and Schramm in Tender Defender, releasing a Mini-LP in 2016 and performing steadily on and off since. Tender Defender is considered to be an extension of Latterman.

=== Iron Chic ===
Following Latterman's breakup in 2007– Douglas briefly joined Small Arms Dealer- also a Long Island band signed to Deep Elm Records- as a drummer before the band's breakup shortly thereafter. Douglas and Jason Lubrano- vocalist of Small Arms Dealer- started a new band with former Latterman bandmate Brian Crozier, Gordon Lafler and John Mee. Following their 2008 Demo and their Shitty Rambo EP, former Capital guitarist Rob McAllister and Dead Broke Records label head and Get Bent bassist Mike Bruno replaced Crozier and Mee respectively. This lineup released Not Like This and The Constant One on Dead Broke and Bridge Nine Records respectively before signing with SideOneDummy and releasing You Can't Stay Here in 2017– written following guitarist Rob McAllister's death at the age of 36. The album received glowing reviews and the band toured in support of the album throughout 2017 and 2018.

=== Other work ===
Douglas operated a recording studio out of his home in Long Island called The Hobo House until its closure in 2020. To date Douglas has produced all of Iron Chic's work, Tender Defender, RVIVR, Slingshot Dakota, Petal Head, Crash The Calm, Latterman and Somerset Thrower amongst many others.
