= Brian Crozier (guitarist) =

American guitarist

Brian Crozier is an American guitarist. Crozier was a member of Bottle Rocket, but after their 2006 breakup, he replaced Mike "MR" Campbell as the new guitarist of Latterman, a four-piece punk rock band from Huntington, New York. Crozier joined the band just before their European tour, and he is featured on the band's last album, "We Are Still Alive". He is an original member of Iron Chic and is on their Demo Tape '08 and the Shitty Rambo E.P. He currently plays in New York City's Pox.
