= G'Ra Asim =

American academic

G’Ra Asim is a writer and musician, and an assistant professor of Creative Writing at Washington University in St. Louis. He is the author of Boyz n the Void: a mixtape to my brother, published by Beacon Press. Asim has served as Writing Director at the African American Policy Forum, a gender and race justice think tank at Columbia Law School and a graduate teaching fellow in Columbia University's Undergraduate Writing Program. He sings, plays bass, and writes lyrics for DIY pop punk quintet, Baby Got Back Talk.

== Early life ==
Asim was born in St. Louis. He is the son of author, poet, playwright, and professor of writing, literature and publishing at Emerson College, Jabari Asim. His mother was involved in The Black Rep (St. Louis). He primarily grew up on the East Coast.

== Education ==
Asim obtained a Master of Fine Arts in Nonfiction Writing from Columbia University in 2018, and a Bachelor of Arts in Writing, Literature, and Publishing from Emerson College in 2014, where he graduated magna cum laude.

== Writing ==
Asim is an assistant professor of Creative Writing at Washington University in St. Louis. Previously, he served as assistant professor of Nonfiction Writing at Ithaca College in New York, and as Writing Director at the African American Policy Forum in New York. His work has appeared in Slate, Guernica, The Baffler, and The New Republic. His Salon essay, Obama Ruins It for Smart Black Guys, was featured in NYT’s Idea of the Day recommended reading section.

Asim has hosted or been in conversation with other writers, including Colson Whitehead and John Darnielle.

Asim is the author of the Kirkus Review-starred book, Boyz n the Void: a mixtape to my brother. Kirkus Reviews named Boyz n the Void one of the best nonfiction books of 2021. The book blends music and cultural criticism and personal essay to explore race, gender, class, and sexuality in relation to punk rock and straight edge culture. According to Santi Elijah Holley of The Washington Post, "Asim presents the book as a compilation of personal letters to his younger brother, Gyasi, supplemented by its own song, usually of the pop-punk variety. Following a similar model as James Baldwin's "My Dungeon Shook" and Ta-Nehisi Coates's "Between the World and Me" — works written, respectively, to Baldwin's nephew and Coates's son — Asim seeks to convey caution and road-weary wisdom to his young charge."

In 2026, Asim published 99 Problems Finding the 1: a love story (sort of) through Beacon Press.

== Music ==
=== A Spike Lee Joint ===
In 2010, four Maryland musicians, including Asim, collaborated to form a punk/pop band called A Spike Lee Joint. The Washington Post called them “budding irrepressibles,” and noted that the band: “arrived at its name by taking a touchstone of black culture and repurposing it.” Days after The Washington Post wrote that story, Spike Lee hit the band with a cease-and-desist.

=== Baby Got Back Talk ===
Asim sings, plays bass, and writes lyrics for Baby Got Back Talk. The band was named one of Alternative Press’ “17 rising Black alternative bands who are leading the next generation.” Formed in 2017, the band signed to Wiretap Records in 2022. Baby Got Back Talk has released a pair of extended plays: Take This The Wrong Way in 2017 and Up In Open Arms in 2018. Their full-length debut, Genre Reveal Party, released in 2020, was mixed by Paul Leavitt (All Time Low, Senses Fail, Yellowcard). The band released Existential Shred, recorded at Nada Recording Studios with John Naclerio (Just Surrender, The Audition), in 2022. PunkNews's Best of 2022 list featured Existential Shred.

Baby Got Back Talk performed at AfroPunk Festival in 2019, Punk Island in 2018, and the 5th Anniversary Remembrance Ceremony of the #SayHerNameCampaign in 2019.
