= Cocksure (album) =

Studio album by Laura Stevenson
- Released: October 30, 2015
- Recorded: May 2015
- Studio: Room 17 (Brooklyn)
- Genres: Indie rock; indie folk
- Length: 35:06
- Label: Don Giovanni
- Producer: Jeff Rosenstock

Laura Stevenson chronology
Wheel (2013)	Cocksure (2015)	The Big Freeze (2019)

Professional ratings
Review scores
Source	Rating
Pitchfork Media	7/10
Spin	7/10

Cocksure is the fourth studio album by American singer-songwriter Laura Stevenson, released through Don Giovanni Records on October 30, 2015. A music video for her song "Jellyfish" was premiered on The A.V. Club website on the album's day of release.

== Track listing ==
All tracks are written by Laura Stevenson.

Cocksure track listing
No.	Title	Length
1.	"Out with a Whimper"	4:37
2.	"Torch Song"	2:57
3.	"Jellyfish"	2:36
4.	"Ticker Tape"	2:56
5.	"Emily in Half"	2:21
6.	"Diet of Worms"	3:04
7.	"Happier, Etc."	2:15
8.	"Fine Print"	1:29
9.	"Claustrophobe"	3:20
10.	"Life Is Long"	3:21
11.	"Tom Sawyer / You Know Where You Can Find Me"	6:10
Total length:		35:06

== Personnel ==
Credits adapted from the album's liner notes.

- Laura Stevenson – arrangements, voice, electric guitars, acoustic guitars, keyboards, piano, glockenspiel
- Jeff Rosenstock – production, arrangements, organs, synthesizer, guitar, glockenspiel, graphic design
- Joe Rogers – engineering
- Jack Shirley – mixing, mastering
- Peter Naddeo – pre-production engineering, additional tracking, arrangements, electric guitars, acoustic guitars, mandolin
- Alex Billig – arrangements, accordion, organs, piano
- Mike Campbell – arrangements, bass guitar
- Samantha Niss – arrangements, drums, percussion
- Brent Arnold – cello
- Chris Farren – claps
- Mark Glick – cello
- Kelly Pratt – trumpet
- Christopher Hainey – photography
