= Sasami =

American singer-songwriter (born 1990)

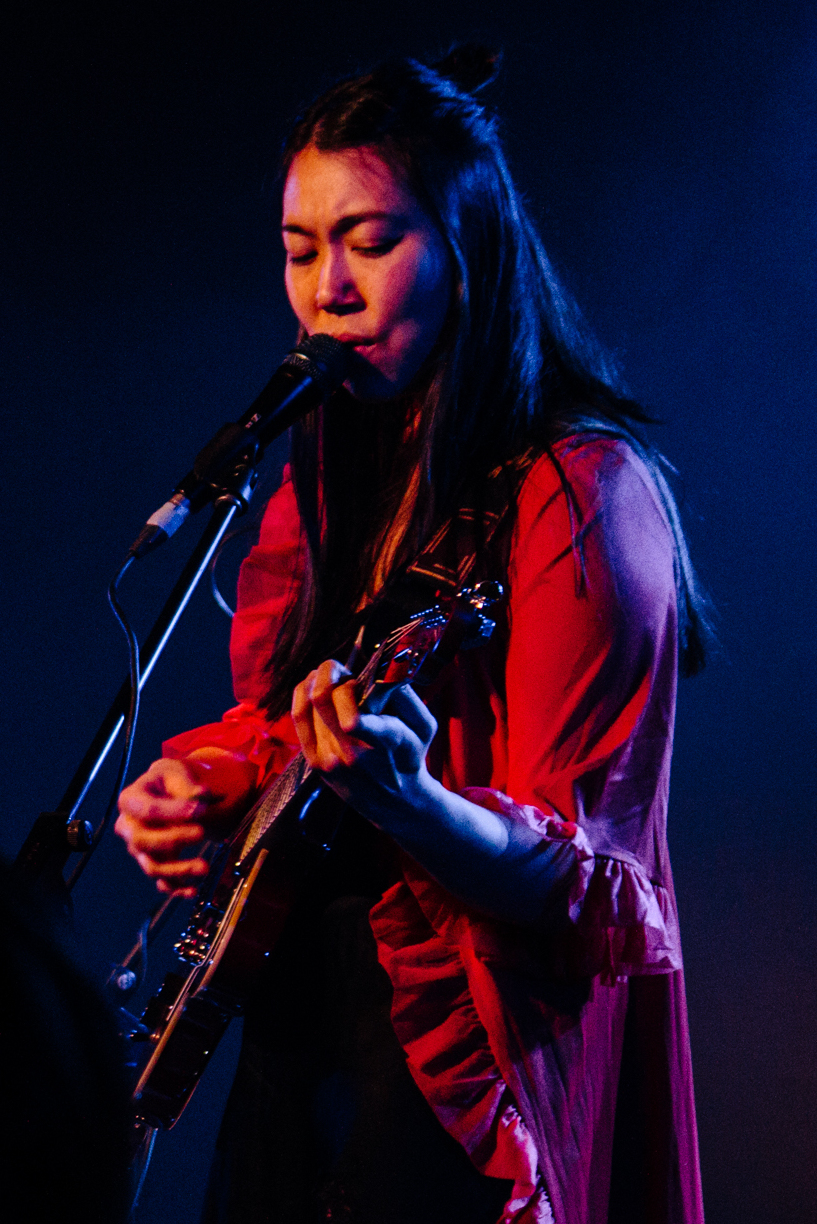
- Sasami performing in 2018

Background information
- Born: Sasami Ashworth; June 23, 1990 (age 36); Bronxville, New York, US
- Origin: Los Angeles, California, US
- Genres: Indie rock; country rock; alternative metal
- Occupations: Singer-songwriter; musician
- Instruments: Vocals; keyboards; bass; guitar; French horn
- Years active: 2012–present
- Label: Domino
- Formerly of: Cherry Glazerr
- Website: sasamiashworth.com

Sasami Ashworth (born June 23, 1990), known mononymously as Sasami (stylized as SASAMI), is an American musician who records music in a variety of styles, from singer-songwriter ballads to heavy metal and industrial. She began her career as a member of Cherry Glazerr but went solo in 2018. Her most recent album, Blood on the Silver Screen, was released on March 7, 2025.

Throughout 2023 and 2024, Sasami toured as a member of ambient pop artist Yeule's backing band.

== Career ==
=== Early life ===
Born in Bronxville, New York, Sasami Ashworth comes from a Zainichi family. Her father is of German descent and her mother was a Korean born in Japan during the Japanese occupation of Korea. Ashworth spoke Korean and Japanese growing up and was part of the Unification Church. She learned the French horn in middle school and attended the Los Angeles County High School for the Arts alongside members of Haim. After she graduated from the Eastman School of Music in 2012, she scored and made orchestral arrangements for films, commercials and studio albums, and worked as a music teacher in Los Angeles, where she is currently based. In 2015, she joined the American rock band Cherry Glazerr with whom she played synths and toured for two and a half years before announcing her departure in January 2018 to pursue her solo musical career.

=== Solo career ===
In April 2018, Sasami shared her first solo track "Callous" on SoundCloud, which Pitchfork awarded with their "Best New Track" label. Later that year Domino Recording Company announced that Sasami had signed to their label, and released the songs "Callous" and "Not the Time". The Fader called Sasami "rock's next big thing." Sasami stated, "I wrote both of these songs on tour on a guitar on my iPad with GarageBand plugins and Moog 15 app sounds and then re-recorded them in the studio onto tape with really great tones. So it's kind of like emotionally scribbling a letter on a tear and snot-stained napkin and then re-writing it on fancy papyrus paper to make it look like you have your shit together." The songs were released on a 7" vinyl in October 2018.

Throughout 2018, Sasami toured with various musicians, including Baths, No Joy, King Tuff, Mitski, Soccer Mommy, Snail Mail and Menace Beach. In early 2019, Sasami announced her eponymous debut studio album, Sasami, and released two more singles. The album was released in March of that year. In February 2022 Sasami released her second album, Squeeze, on Domino. The album received many positive reviews and was named as one of the best albums of the year by Rolling Stone. In 2023, Sasami toured in support of Yeule as a solo performer and guitarist in Yeule’s band.

== Personal life ==
Sasami identifies as queer. As a child, her family brought her up in the Unification Church, which she would later refer to as a cult.

== Discography ==
=== Studio albums ===
Title	Details
Sasami	Released: March 8, 2019; Label: Domino; Formats: LP, CD, digital download
Squeeze	Released: February 25, 2022; Label: Domino; Formats: LP, CD, digital download
Blood on the Silver Screen	Released: March 7, 2025; Label: Domino; Formats: LP, CD, digital download

=== Singles ===
Title	Year	Album
"Callous"	2018	Sasami
"Not the Time"	2018	Sasami
"Jealousy"	2019	Sasami
"Free"	2019	Sasami
"The Greatest"	2021	Squeeze
"Skin a Rat"	2021	Squeeze
"Say It"	2022	Squeeze
"Call Me Home"	2022	Squeeze
"Honeycrash"	2024	Blood on the Silver Screen
"Slugger"	2024	Blood on the Silver Screen
"Just Be Friends"	2024	Blood on the Silver Screen
"In Love with a Memory" (feat. Clairo)	2025	Blood on the Silver Screen

=== Credits ===
Year	Album	Artist	Credit(s)	Ref.
2014	At Best Cuckold	Avi Buffalo	Horns	
2017	Face Your Fear	Curtis Harding	String arrangements	
2018	Indigo	Wild Nothing	Background vocals	
