= Petal Head =

American indie rock band

- Origin: Long Island, New York, United States
- Genres: Shoegaze, Stoner Rock, Indie Rock
- Years active: 2014-present
- Labels: Dead Broke Rekerds
- Members: Michael Guidice; Andy Laurino; Brandan Cox

Petal Head is an American Indie Rock band from Long Island, New York, United States. The band currently consists of Michael Guidice, Andy Laurino, Brandan Cox. The band has released a full-length and 1 EP to date on Dead Broke Rekerds.

== Background ==
Petal Head was formed in 2014 after the dissolution of Singer/Guitarist Michael Guidice's previous band Seawave. Guidice recruited bassist Andy Laurino and drummer Brandan Cox and began performing under the name Vape. Soon after recording a 2-song demo under that name- the band changed their name to Petal Head and began work on their debut full length. The album- titled Raspberry Cough was released September 1, 2015 on Dead Broke Rekerds with a music video filmed for lead single "Spooky Something". The band followed the album in 2016 with the 3 song In My Head Dreams Melt EP- also released by Dead Broke Rekerds.

== Members ==
- Michael Guidice – Guitar, Vocals (2014–Present)
- Andy Laurino – Bass (2014–Present)
- Brandan Cox – Drums (2014–Present)
- Rob Rice – Guitar (2021–Present)

== Discography ==
- 2015: Raspberry Cough

== EP's & Singles ==
- 2014: Demo (As Vape)
- 2016: In My Head Dreams Melt
- 2018: Darkworld
