= Cherry Glazerr =

American rock band

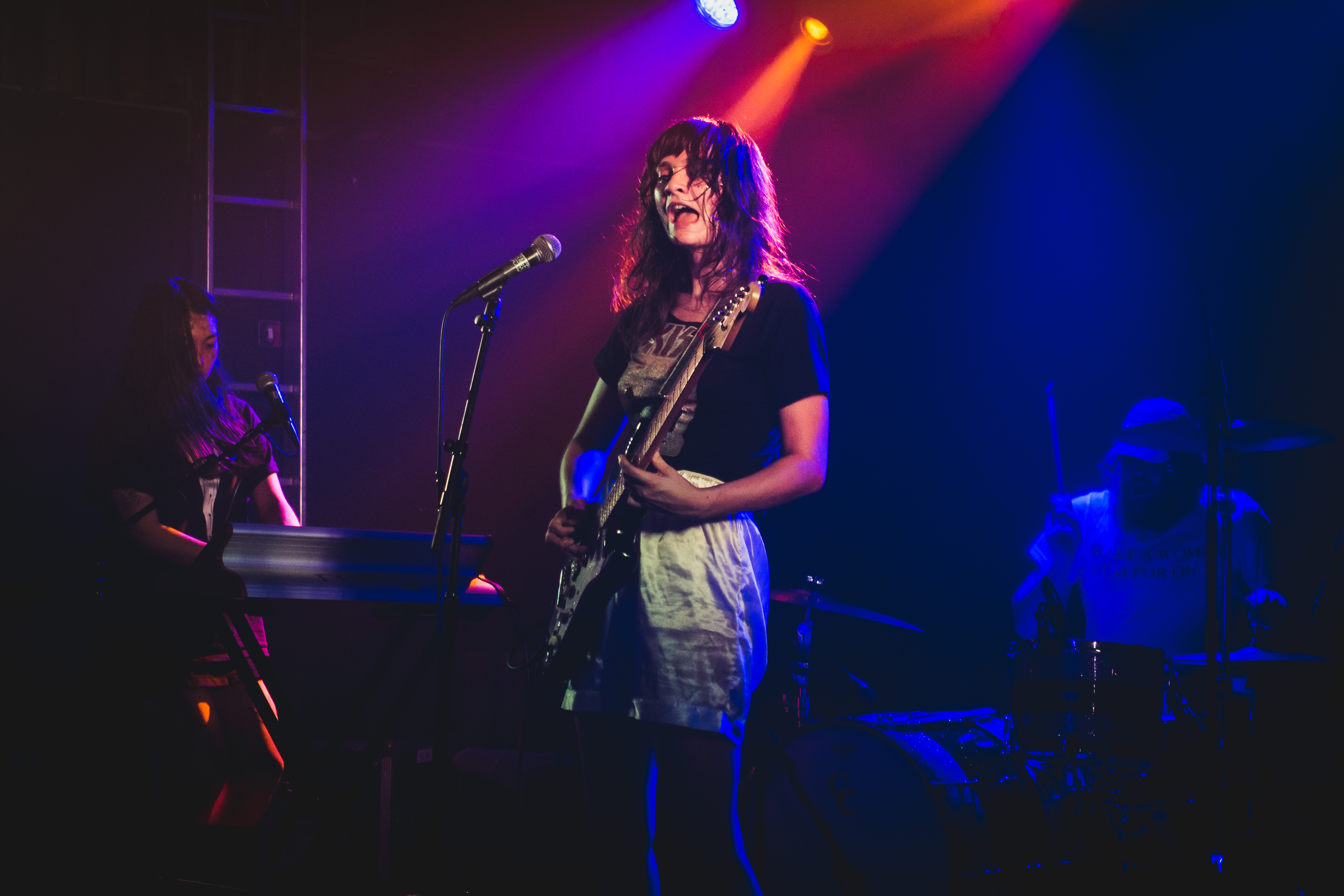
- Cherry Glazerr performing in 2017. Left to right: Sasami Ashworth, Clementine Creevy, Tabor Allen

Background information
- Origin: Los Angeles, California, U.S.
- Genres: Noise pop, garage rock, indie rock, grunge
- Years active: 2013–present
- Labels: Burger Records, Secretly Canadian
- Members: Clementine Creevy; Sami Perez; Luke Macdonald; Nick Pillot
- Past members: Sasami Ashworth; Sean Redman; Hannah Uribe; Sophia Muller; Devin O'Brien; Tabor Allen

Cherry Glazerr is an American rock band from Los Angeles, formed in 2013. The current lineup consists of guitarist and lead vocalist Clementine Creevy, bassist Sami Perez, synth player Luke Macdonald and drummer Nick Pillot. The band's sound has transitioned from lo-fi and garage rock on their debut release Haxel Princess in 2014 to a more polished rock sound, with elements of grunge, punk and new wave on their subsequent releases Apocalipstick and Stuffed & Ready. Their fourth studio album, I Don't Want You Anymore, was released on Secretly Canadian on September 29, 2023.

== History ==
=== Formation and early years (2012–2016) ===
Cherry Glazerr originated as Clembutt, a solo project for then-15-year-old vocalist and guitarist Clementine Creevy, who wrote, performed and uploaded a small catalog of songs onto SoundCloud in 2012. The tracks were discovered by Burger Records co-founder Sean Bohrman, who released them as a tape titled Papa Cremp in 2013. In 2013, Creevy was joined by her high school friends Hannah Uribe and Sophia Muller, on drums and vocals respectively, and Sean Redman on bass. The band takes its name from KCRW reporter Chery Glaser. Glazerr began performing with a number of prominent bands and festival scenes in 2013, including SXSW, Beach Goth, at the El Rey with Mikal Cronin and Redd Kross, and alongside Fidlar at Burger Records' annual Burgerama festival, where they captured the attention of fashion icon Hedi Slimane.

In 2014, the band, now a trio following the departure of vocalist Sophia Muller, released their full-length debut Haxel Princess on Burger Records, featuring percussion by Joel Jerome. The album, described as "concocted from a mix of attitude, silliness and garage-born guitar haze" was praised for Creevy's unique vocals – alternating from dreamy to high-pitched, hostile and unforgiving – and for its cynical, witty lyrics.

=== Apocalipstick and Stuffed & Ready (2017–present) ===
Cherry Glazerr released their sophomore album, Apocalipstick, on January 20, 2017. The band's first album for Secretly Canadian was recorded at Hollywood's Sunset Sound studio in early 2016 with producers Joe Chicarrelli (The Strokes, The White Stripes) and Carlos De La Garza (Paramore), and explores themes of female empowerment, individuality, sexuality and consumerism. Apocalipstick was released to overall critical approval: it was described by Pitchfork as the band's "fiercest recording yet, full of shredding jams, furious howls, and self-aware swagger', and its lead single "Told You I'd Be With The Guys" as a "tremendous indie rock tune powerful enough to restore your faith in the genre" by The Guardian.

Cherry Glazerr toured extensively across Europe and North America throughout 2017, supporting Foster the People and Slowdive on their North American tours, and playing a number of festivals, including FYF Fest, Pitchfork Fest and La Route du Rock.

In 2018, Cherry Glazerr played at Coachella, opened for Portugal. The Man and The Breeders, and released a new single, "Juicy Socks".

In November 2018, Cherry Glazerr announced their new album Stuffed & Ready would be released on February 1, 2019. They released a new single, "Daddi", with the announcement, accompanied by an animated music video directed by Danny Cole. In 2021, the band contributed a cover of the Metallica song "My Friend of Misery" to the charity tribute album The Metallica Blacklist.

On July 12, 2023, the band announced that their fourth studio album, I Don't Want You Anymore, would be released on Secretly Canadian on September 29, 2023.

=== Other appearances ===
Music by Cherry Glazerr has been featured on a number of artistic platforms. After recruiting vocalist Clementine Creevy to model for the Yves Saint Laurent Campaign in 2013, creative director Hedi Slimane commissioned Cherry Glazerr to write a song for his Fall 2014 Saint Laurent's women's show ("Had Ten Dollaz"). In 2014, Cherry Glazerr recorded a new version of the Al Dubin and Joe Burke song "Tiptoe Through the Tulips", which was featured in Insidious: Chapter 3. In 2020, the band was featured in a music video for the song "The End of The Game" by the American rock band Weezer, although they were not featured in the song.

== Musical style and influences ==
Rolling Stone described Cherry Glazerr's music as "sarcasm-heavy, garage-rock" with "hooky choruses and punk stomphas" and likened them to other bands with female singers such as Blondie, Sleater-Kinney and Siouxsie and the Banshees. The band has cited influences such as Patti Smith, Joan Jett, Iggy Pop, Björk, Siouxsie Sioux, Joni Mitchell and the Rolling Stones.

== Members ==
The band has undergone a number of lineup changes since its inception. In 2015, Hannah Uribe left the band in pursuit of other artistic projects. In 2015, Cherry Glazerr saw the addition of two new musicians: multi-instrumentalist Sasami Ashworth on synths, who was invited to join the band by Sean Redman, and drummer Tabor Allen, who was subsequently invited to join the band by Ashworth. In mid-2016, and after participating in the recording of Apocalipstick, Redman departed and became a full-time member of his other band The Buttertones. He was replaced by bassist Devin O'Brien in 2017. In January 2018, Cherry Glazerr announced that Sasami Ashworth had left the band in order to concentrate on her own musical projects.

On the subject of the band's change in personnel, Clementine Creevy described Cherry Glazerr as "a band that I lead, that has had a lot of beautiful additions to it and a lot of people have played in it. I'm proud of that...it feels like the type of exploration of collaborative music that I've always wanted to achieve".

Current members

- Clementine Creevy – lead vocals, guitar (2013–present)
- Nick Pillot – drums (2020–present)
- Sami Perez – bass (2019–present)
- Luke Macdonald – synths & guitar (2024–present)

Former members

- Tabor Allen – drums (2015–2020)
- Devin O'Brien – bass (2017–2019)
- Sasami Ashworth – synths (2015–2018)
- Sean Redman – bass (2013–2016)
- Hannah Uribe – drums (2013–2015)
- Sophia Muller – vocals (2013)

== Discography ==
Studio albums

- Haxel Princess (2014)
- Apocalipstick (2017)
- Stuffed & Ready (2019)
- I Don't Want You Anymore (2023)

EPs

- Papa Cremp (2013)
- Had Ten Dollaz (2014)
