= Laura Stevenson =

American singer-songwriter (born 1984)

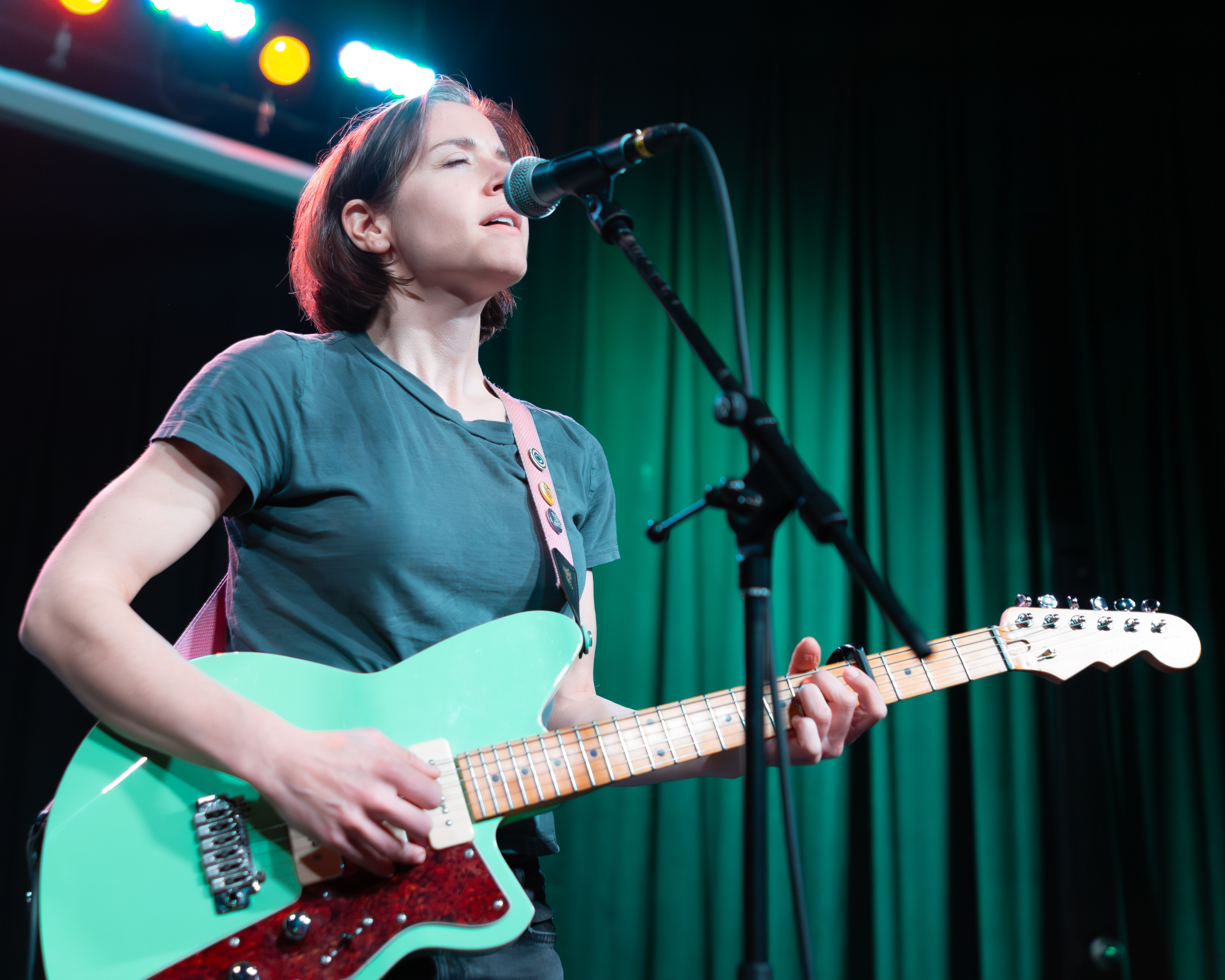
- Stevenson in 2025

Background information
- Born: Laura Anne Stevenson; April 25, 1984 (age 42)
- Genres: Folk rock, indie rock
- Occupation: Musician
- Labels: Quote Unquote; Asian Man; Don Giovanni; Really; Polyvinyl; Mandible; Little Elephant
- Website: http://www.laurastevenson.net

Laura Anne Stevenson (born April 25, 1984) is an American singer-songwriter from Long Island, New York, and formerly a keyboard player for the musical collective Bomb the Music Industry!

== Life and career ==
=== Early life ===
Stevenson was raised in Nassau County, New York. Her grandfather, Harry Simeone, was a successful pianist and composer whose works included "The Little Drummer Boy" and "Do You Hear What I Hear?". His wife, Margaret McCravy, was a singer for the jazz bandleader Benny Goodman. After leaving home for college, Stevenson began both playing guitar and writing songs.

=== Musical career ===
Growing up in Rockville Centre, Stevenson befriended members of the Arrogant Sons of Bitches. After they disbanded in 2005, she was appointed keyboard player for the lead singer Jeff Rosenstock's new project, Bomb the Music Industry!. At this point, she had written a number of songs and was performing solo. While recording and touring with Bomb the Music Industry!, she began to piece together her own band.

Initially, Stevenson's band consisted primarily of members of Bomb the Music Industry!. In summer 2007, Stevenson met Michael Campbell of the Long Island punk band Latterman who began playing bass guitar in her band. Alex Billig was added on trumpet and accordion, and a year later Stevenson began working on her first studio recording.

Asian Man Records released "A Record" on April 13, 2010, on LP and CD. The group spent more than half of that year on tour in the United States, Canada, the United Kingdom and Western Europe in various line-ups with Bomb the Music Industry!, Maps & Atlases, Cults, among others.

The band officially signed to the New Jersey independent label Don Giovanni Records in November 2010, and their second album, Sit Resist, was released on April 26, 2011.

Stevenson's third album, Wheel, was produced and mixed by Kevin S. McMahon at Marcata Recording. It was released on April 23, 2013, on Don Giovanni Records. Pitchfork Media had previously premiered the first single from the album, "Runner". Stevenson toured the U.S. in April and May in support of the album.

On October 30, 2015, Stevenson released her fourth album, Cocksure, on Don Giovanni Records, and the band toured in the United States and Europe in support of the release.

On December 7, 2016, Stevenson released her first live album, recorded at Vera Club and released it via Quote Unquote Records, with 100% of the proceeds being donated to Planned Parenthood.

Stevenson's fifth studio album, The Big Freeze, was released on March 29, 2019, and debuted on the Billboard charts at No. 11 Alternative New Artist Albums, No. 35 for Heatseekers Albums, and No. 41 for Current Alternative Albums. Her sixth album, Laura Stevenson, was released on August 6, 2021.

In 2023, Stevenson embarked on an 11-date tour in celebration of the 10-year anniversary of Wheel, performed reimagined renditions of the album's tracks. Stevenson was accompanied by an orchestral ensemble on the tour.

== Band members ==
- Laura Stevenson: guitar/vocals
- Mike Campbell: bass guitar
- Alex Billig: accordion/trumpet
- Peter Naddeo: guitar
- Samantha Niss: drums

== Discography ==
=== Studio albums ===
Year	Title	Label	Format
2008	A Record	Quote Unquote Records (digital), Asian Man Records (2010 vinyl/CD reissue)	12" vinyl LP, CD
2011	Sit Resist	Don Giovanni Records	12" vinyl LP, CD
2013	Wheel	Don Giovanni Records	12" vinyl LP, CD
2015	Cocksure	Don Giovanni Records	12" vinyl LP, CD
2019	The Big Freeze	Don Giovanni Records	12" vinyl LP, CD
2021	Laura Stevenson	Don Giovanni Records	12" vinyl LP, CD
2025	Late Great	Really Records	12" vinyl LP

=== Jeff and Laura ===
Year	Title	Label	Format
2019	"Still Young"	Polyvinyl Record Co. (Vinyl)	12" vinyl

=== Singles, EPs, live releases ===
Singles, EPs, live releases

Year	Title	Label	Format
2009	Bomb the Music Industry! / Laura Stevenson and the Cans (split)	Quote Unquote Records (digital), Kiss of Death Records (vinyl)	7" vinyl EP
2009	Holy Ghost	Mandible Records	7" vinyl EP
2013	Runner	Don Giovanni Records	7" vinyl EP
2016	Little Elephant Session	Little Elephant	12" vinyl LP (single-sided)
2016	Live at Vera Club	Quote Unquote Records	Digital
