= Bridge and Tunnel (band) =

American punk band

Bridge and Tunnel was an American punk band from Huntington, New York.

== History ==
Bridge and Tunnel began in 2008, releasing a split with the band Young Livers. Bridge and Tunnel also released their first full-length album in 2008 on No Idea Records titled East/West. In 2009, Bridge and Tunnel released a 7" titled Loss Leaders on Yo-Yo Records. In 2010, Bridge and Tunnel released a 10" titled Indoor Voices. In 2011, Bridge and Tunnel released a 7" titled Homecoming. Also in 2011, Bridge and Tunnel released their second and final full-length album on No Idea Records titled Rebuilding Year.

== Band members ==
- Alison Fair
- Jeff Cunningham
- Pat Schramm
- Rachel Rubino
- Tia Meilinger
