= Latterman =

American punk rock band

- Live at Fest Five, October 2006

Background information
- Origin: Huntington Station, New York, United States
- Genres: Punk rock, pop punk, post-hardcore
- Years active: 1999–2007; 2011-2012; 2016; 2018
- Labels: Traffic Violation, Deep Elm, Dead Broke Rekerds, Yo-Yo Records, Ruckus Records
- Members: Phil Douglas; Mattie Canino; Mike "MR" Campbell; Pat Schramm
- Past members: Brian Crozier; Bryce Hackford; Dan Sposato
- Website: Official Site

Latterman is an American semi-active four-piece punk rock band from Huntington, New York, United States.

Phil Douglas and Mattie Jo Canino respectively would go on to form the equally acclaimed Iron Chic and RVIVR. Canino, Douglas and Schramm would go on to form Tender Defender in 2015, considered by many to be an extension of Latterman.

== History ==
The band was formed in 1999 by Matt Canino, Phil Douglas, Dan Sposato and Pat Schramm following the dissolution of Canino's, Douglas' and Sposato's previous band, Five Days Late. In 1999 the band issued their first demo and self released their debut None Of These Songs Are About Girls in 2000. After Sposato's exit and a few replacements, the band finally found a steady guitarist in Mike "MR" Campbell and released their cult classic Turn Up The Punk, We'll Be Singing on Traffic Violation Records.

In 2005 the band struck a deal with Deep Elm Records and released the landmark and highly influential No Matter Where We Go... as well as a re-release of the out-of-print Turn Up The Punk, We'll Be Singing.

Following the release of No Matter Where We Go..., Campbell left the band and was replaced by Brian Crozier. This lineup recorded and released the band's fourth and final studio album, 2006's We Are Still Alive.

On October 18, 2007, music website Punknews.org reported that the band had officially broken up. Canino issued a statement via Punknews where she stated that "I felt like a broken record going on tour and talking about sexism in punk rock every night and then some fucking bro-dudes coming up to me and saying some fucked up shit. I even got to a point where I stopped calling them out on it, and that just felt wrong. I was tired. Basically, it just stopped making sense for everyone in the band to keep on doing the band."

Members have since gone on to play in bands including Iron Chic, Bridge and Tunnel, RVIVR, Laura Stevenson and The Cans, Daytrader, Pox, Shorebirds, Mutoid Men (not to be confused with Mutoid Man) and The Brass.

In December 2011, the band reunited for four shows with the No Matter Where We Go... lineup. To coincide with the reunion shows, the band released "Our Better Halves", an unreleased song that was the final recording the band ever did.

Since 2011, the band has played live sporadically since their break up with having performed a small handful of shows in 2011, 2012, 2016 and 2018. 2016 saw the release of the self-titled debut from Tender Defender, a band formed by 3/4ths of the band (Canino, Douglas and Schramm).

Douglas and Canino currently play in Iron Chic and RVIVR, respectively.

== Musical style and legacy ==
Latterman are described as "pop-punk/post-hardcore hybridists" with a sound characterized by high tempos, "aggressive" instrumentation and "shout-singing" vocals. Corey Apar of AllMusic explains that Latterman "balances out being tough without being harsh, heartfelt without being emo, and uplifting without succumbing to cheese". Their music has been compared to fellow northeast punk rock act Lifetime.

Vocal duties in the band were shared by guitarist Phil Douglas and bassist Mattie Jo Canino, and their songs often contained political and/or socially conscious lyrics that are said to be positive in tone. According to Andrew Sacher of BrooklynVegan, the band's hooks are "built to be shouted by an entire room in unison".

The band is considered highly influential in the pop-punk genre with their album No Matter Where We Go... being considered a staple of the genre. Latterman's apparent influence has been observed in the works of bands such as Spraynard and Timeshares. Paul Blest of VICE said,

"Latterman’s arrival as a young, high speed, politically aware band came at sort of an awkward time in punk; if they had formed ten years earlier, they might have occupied a similar spot in the scene as legendary political punk bands like Propagandhi, Bikini Kill, and Fifteen. If they had started around four or five years ago, they might be seeing a level of success similar to any of the bands that they formed afterwards, like RVIVR or Iron Chic."

The staff of Consequence ranked the band at number 62 on their list of "The 100 Best Pop Punk Bands" in 2019. Staff writer Collin Brennan wrote: "There’s a certain style of pop punk that only truly makes sense in a live setting — the kind where every song is a shout-along, every riff is a ripper, and every moment feels like a life-or-death struggle between the good guys (everyone in the room) and the bad (everyone else). It wouldn’t be accurate to say that New York’s Latterman invented this style, but it wouldn’t be a stretch to say that they perfected it. The group’s seminal album No Matter Where We Go…! married melody and ferocity in a way that hasn’t really been duplicated since, so long as you don’t count all the bands (RVIVR, Iron Chic, Tender Defender) that Latterman’s members eventually went on to form."

== Members ==
- Phil Douglas - vocals, guitar
- Mattie Jo Canino - vocals, bass
- Mike "MR" Campbell- guitar
- Pat Schramm - drums

== Former members ==
- Dan Sposato
- Bryce Hackford
- Brian Crozier
- Ian Campbell
- Jeff Cunningham

== Discography ==
- None of These Songs Are About Girls (self-released, 2000)
- Split 7" with Nakatomi Plaza (Rok Lok Records / BD Records / Sot Records, 2000)
- Turn Up The Punk, We'll Be Singing (Traffic Violation Records, 2002; reissued on Deep Elm Records, 2005. LP vinyl pressing on Yo-Yo Records 2006, LP vinyl pressing on NO IDEA Records 2011.)
- No Matter Where We Go...! (Deep Elm Records, 2005 LP vinyl pressing on Yo-Yo Records 2006, LP vinyl pressing on NO IDEA Records 2011.)
- We Are Still Alive (Deep Elm Records, 2006 LP vinyl pressing on NO IDEA Records 2007)

== Other releases ==
- V/A The Hope Machine compilation CD (Rok Lok Records, 2001)
- V/A Young Til I Die compilation CD (Waggy Records, 2001)
- V/A Commercial: Traffic Violation Records Compilation (Traffic Violation 2002)
- Live At The Milestone - June 2005 DVD (Deep Elm Records, 2005)
- V/A This Was Supposed to be a Celebration compilation CD (Mauled by Tigers, 2007)
- "Our Better Halves" (Single) (Self-Released, 2011)
