= RVIVR =

American punk rock band in Washington

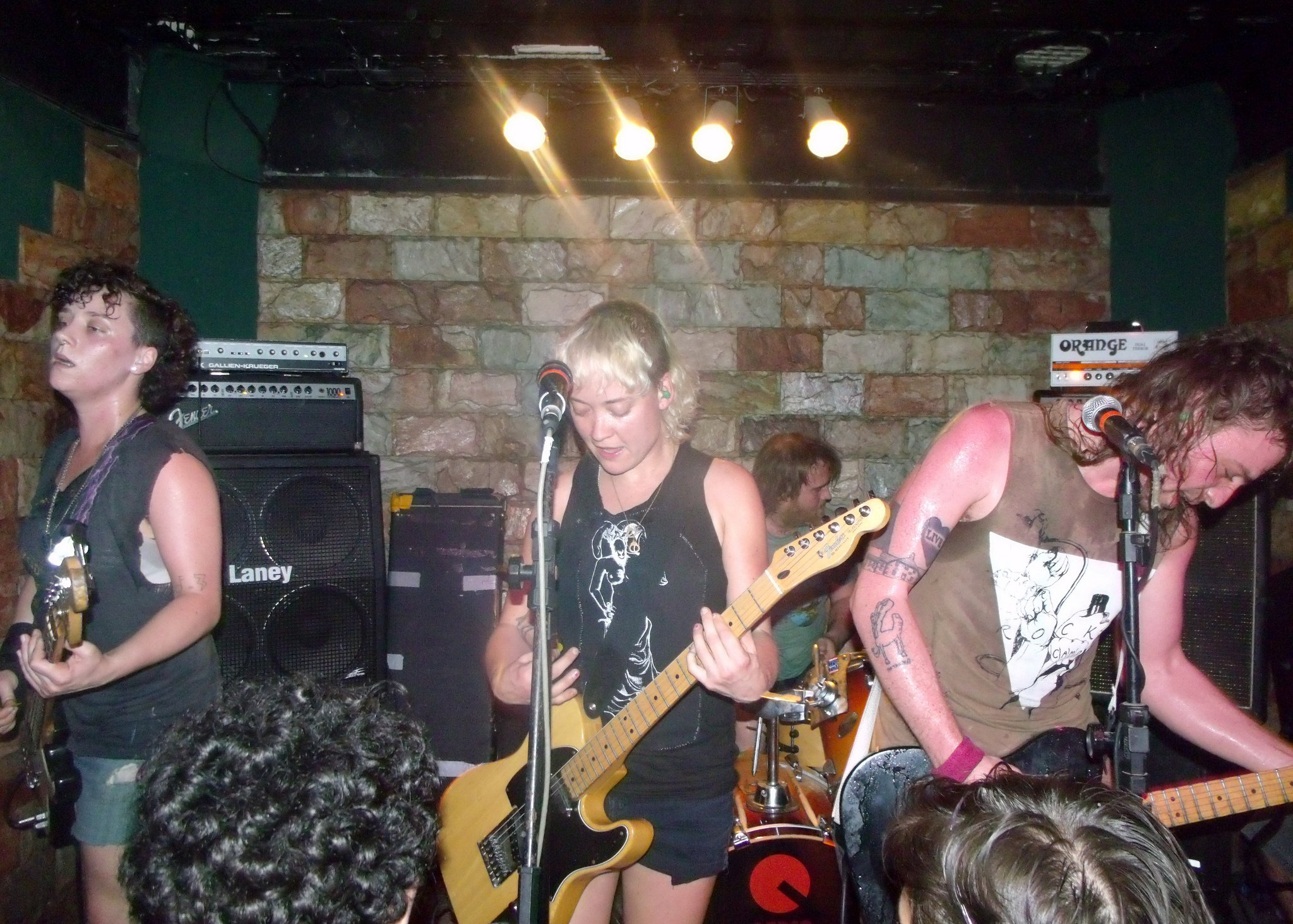
- RVIVR performing in February 2011

Background information
- Origin: Olympia, Washington
- Genres: Punk rock, melodic hardcore, pop punk, Queercore
- Years active: 2008–2018 (Unannounced hiatus)
- Labels: Rumbletowne, Yo-Yo, Don Giovanni
- Members: Erica Freas; Mattie Jo Canino; Kevin Rainsberry; Buddy Neilson
- Past members: Joey Seward; Tammy Martin; Cameron Thaut; Nell Tallos; Al Paoli; Bex Berryhill
- Website: rvivr.net

RVIVR is an American punk rock band from Olympia, Washington. The band tours frequently and their shows are characterised by energetic performances as well as defense of gender equality. They have released their studio albums and EPs as free downloads on Rumbletowne Records' website.

== History ==
After the dissolution of New York band Latterman in 2007, Mattie Jo Canino moved to Olympia, Washington and with Erica Freas (vocals, guitar), Kevin Rainsberry (drums), and Nell Tallos (bass) formed RVIVR.

Canino had felt that Latterman's political lyrics were being ignored by largely male audiences only interested in moshing. For RVIVR; Canino and Freas, in both songwriting and interviews, vocally ensure the message of gender and sociopolitical equality is at the heart of what the band does.

They released 7-inch EP Life Moves at the end of 2008 on Freas's Rumbletowne Records, along with Derailer the next year. Their eponymous debut album was recorded with Canino's former Latterman bandmate Phil Douglas. It was released in April 2010 with the band touring the U.S. and Europe tour in support. German label Yo-Yo Records released 7-inch Dirty Water the same year. Rolling Stone listed the album at No. 49 on their feature "The 50 Greatest Pop Punk Albums".

In 2011 Tallos left the band and was replaced by Al Paoli. The tracks from their first three EPs were compiled as Joester Sessions '08-'11, named after Joey Seward with whom they had recorded everything. After which they released another 7-inch on Yo-Yo, Belebend.

Their second album The Beauty Between, also recorded with Joey Seward, came out in 2013 on Rumbletowne in the U.S. and Yo-Yo in Europe.

For the next couple of years the band toured the U.S., Europe, and Australia with various bassists, including Caves' Lou Hanman. In 2014 the band released the 12-inch EP Bicker and Breathe, again on Rumbletowne and Yo-Yo.

In 2017 the band self released 7-inch "The Tide", and Don Giovanni Records reissued the band's first two albums and the compilation.

== Members ==
Current

- Erica Freas – vocals, guitar (2008–present)
- Mattie Jo Canino – vocals, guitar (2008–present)
- Kevin Rainsberry – drums (2008–present)

Current touring musicians

- Lou Hanman – bass (2014, 2016–present)

Former

- Nell Tallos – bass (2008–2011)
- Al Paoli – bass (2011–2012)
- Bex Berryhill – bass (2013–2014)

Former touring musicians

- Tammy Martin – bass (2011)
- Cameron Thaut – bass (2011, 2014)
- David Combs – bass (2014–2015)
- Sue Werner #10 – bass (2015)

Former studio musicians

- Chris Bauermeister - bass (Bicker and Breather EP, 2014)
- Joey Seward - bass (2010, 2013–2014)

== Discography ==
=== Studio albums ===
- RVIVR (2010)
- The Beauty Between (2013)

=== EPs/singles ===
- Life Moves 7-inch (2008)
- Derailer 7-inch (2009)
- Dirty Water EP (2010)
- Belebend 7-inch (2011)
- Bicker and Breathe EP (2014)
- The Tide (b Shaggy) 7-inch (2017)

=== Compilations ===
- The Joester Sessions Collection (2011)
