= Vacation (Bomb the Music Industry! album) =

Studio album by Bomb the Music Industry!
- Released: July 26, 2011
- Genres: Pop punk, indie rock, power pop
- Length: 42:55
- Labels: Quote Unquote Records, Ernest Jenning, Really Records
- Producer: Jeff Rosenstock

Bomb the Music Industry! chronology
| Adults!!!: Smart!!! Shithammered!!! And Excited by Nothing!!!!!!! (2010) | Vacation (2011) |

Vacation is the seventh and final studio album by American punk rock band Bomb the Music Industry!. It released on July 26, 2011, by Quote Unquote Records, Ernest Jenning, and Really Records. It was announced in September 2010.

Much of the music was written while Jeff Rosenstock was on a free trip to Belize, and unlike the band's previous albums, it is "about trying to build a home."

There are guest contributions from members of Fake Problems, Bayside, Andrew Jackson Jihad, and Good Luck.

In a 2015 interview Rosenstock named Vacation as his favorite Bomb the Music Industry! album. Rosenstock said:

Once I realized that we were orbiting punk in our own weird way, along with bands like Andrew Jackson Jihad and Good Luck and Laura Stevenson and the Cans and The Sidekicks, where we just kind of made records and weren't thinking about if they were punk or indie or whatever, we were just making records. That made this record have a bit of a different tone. I got the courage to say, "Fuck it, I'm going to make the record that I want to make and I know some people are going to not like it no matter what." No matter what, there's going to be reviews that say my voice is shitty. No matter what, the punk kids are going to say, "This is too slow, this used to be better, blah blah blah." So I was just going to keep on keeping on.

On August 2, 2021, Rosenstock released a collection of demos in honor of the album's ten year anniversary. Unlike the previously released Scrambles demos, this collection appears to feature other musicians. Like the Scrambles demos; a short piece of writing, detailing the creation of the album, was included.

Professional ratings
Aggregate scores
| Source | Rating |
|---|---|
| Metacritic | 88/100 |
Review scores
| Source | Rating |
| Punknews.org | 4.5/5 stars |
| Alternative Press | 5/5 stars |
| Consequence of Sound | 4/5 stars |
| Absolutepunk | 85% |
| Rockfreaks.net | 7/10 stars |
| The A.V. Club | 5/5 stars |

== Track listing ==
All songs written by Jeff Rosenstock except where noted.

| No. | Title | Length |
|---|---|---|
| 1. | "Campaign For A Better Next Weekend" | 4:54 |
| 2. | "Vocal Coach" | 2:26 |
| 3. | "Everybody That You Love" | 3:19 |
| 4. | "Sponge Board/Baby Waves" | 0:38 |
| 5. | "The Shit That You Hate" | 5:54 |
| 6. | "Hurricane Waves" | 2:51 |
| 7. | "Sick, Later." | 3:40 |
| 8. | "Why, Oh Why, Oh Why (Oh Oh Oh Oh)" | 4:42 |
| 9. | "Savers" (Mike Campbell, Jeff Rosenstock) | 3:45 |
| 10. | "Can't Complain" | 3:19 |
| 11. | "Everybody That Loves You" | 3:13 |
| 12. | "Sunny Place/Shady People" | 0:45 |
| 13. | "Felt Just Like Vacation" | 3:36 |
| Total length: | | 42:55 |

CD hidden tracks
| No. | Title | Length |
|---|---|---|
| 14. | "Don't Destroy Yourself" (also featured on vinyl after side B locked groove) | 5:47 |
| 15. | "Don't Have Shitty Friends" | 0:57 |

Vacation (Demos)
| No. | Title | Length |
|---|---|---|
| 1. | "Campaign For A Better Next Weekend" | 4:55 |
| 2. | "Vocal Coach" | 2:34 |
| 3. | "Everybody That You Love" | 3:30 |
| 4. | "Sponge Board/Baby Waves" | 0:38 |
| 5. | "The Shit That You Hate" | 5:55 |
| 6. | "Hurricane Waves" | 2:58 |
| 7. | "Siiiiick, Laaaater" | 3:39 |
| 8. | "Savers" (Mike Campbell, Jeff Rosenstock) | 3:37 |
| 9. | "Can't Complain" | 3:10 |
| 10. | "Sleep-Thru Monday" | 2:25 |
| 11. | "Everybody That Loves You (Restructure)" | 3:06 |
| 12. | "YOYOY(OOOO)" ( (Note: Both "Everybody That Loves You (Restructure)" and "YOYOY(OOOO)" are tagged as track 11 in the official download. There is no file officially tagged as track 12. This article uses alphabetical order for these two files for convenience.)) | 4:51 |
| 13. | "Sunny Place/Shady People" | 0:46 |
| 14. | "Felt Just Like Vacation" | 4:43 |
| 15. | "Detailed List Of Faults To Be Read Once And Destroyed (AKA (Don't Destroy Yourself))" | 5:27 |
| Total length: | | 50:36 |

== Details ==
"Everybody That You Love" was originally released in summer 2010 as a single and demo versions of "Hurricane Waves" and "Can't Complain" were previously released in early 2011. All three songs were re-recorded for Vacation.

A clip from the 1993 film Airborne appears at the end of "Can't Complain."

The song "Can't Complain" was featured in episode twelve of the eighth season of The Office, "Pool Party".

Sponge Board / Baby Waves is a reference to a line from the surf movie Blue Crush.

== Personnel ==
=== Main band ===
- Mike Costa - Drums
- John DeDomenici - Bass, Drums
- Matt Keegan - Trombone, Synthesizer, Glockenspiel, Vocals
- Tom Malinowski - Guitar, Vocals
- Jeff Rosenstock - Vocals, Guitars, Saxophone, Keyboards, Programming, Drums

=== Additional personnel ===
- Ginger Alford: Vocals
- Neil Callaghan: Farfisa Organ
- Chris Candy: Trumpet
- Steve Ciolek: Vocals
- Katie Cleary: Bass
- Steven D'Agostino: Banjo
- Chris Farren: Vocals
- Ben Gallatty: Upright Bass
- Chris Guglielmo: Drums
- Mike Huguenor: Vocals
- Aidan Kohler: Violins
- Casey Lee: Pedal Steel
- Sean McCabe: Mandolin, Tannerin
- Lindsay McMullen: Cello
- Dave Renz: Vocals
- Matt Scheuermann: Vocals
- Skylar Suorez: Vibraphone
- Witt Wisebram: Harmonica
