= Adults!!!: Smart!!! Shithammered!!! And Excited by Nothing!!!!!!! =

- The version of the cover used for the vinyl release

Studio album by Bomb the Music Industry!
- Released: February 8, 2010
- Genres: Ska punk, pop punk
- Length: 21:40
- Label: Quote Unquote
- Producers: Bomb the Music Industry!, Jeff Rosenstock

Bomb the Music Industry! chronology
Scrambles (2009)	Adults!!!: Smart!!! Shithammered!!! And Excited by Nothing!!!!!!! (2010)	Vacation (2011)

Adults!!!: Smart!!! Shithammered!!! And Excited by Nothing!!!!!!! is a studio album by Bomb the Music Industry! which was released digitally on February 8, 2010 via Quote Unquote Records. Adults!!! is the only Bomb the Music Industry! album to not contain samples of television shows, movies, phone messages or other songs between tracks.

== Background ==
A version of "Struggler" was previously released as a single on December 29, 2009. The original version was recorded without a full band in Jeff Rosenstock's bedroom as a tribute to "Sweet Home Cananada", released five years before. It was recorded, mixed and released in only five days.

In a 2015 interview Rosenstock recalled:

I was planning on putting out a series of seven-inch singles after Scrambles, but that became overly complicated and I never did anything. So I had all these songs just fucking sitting there and I couldn't get past them. One night, I went out to see Laura [Stevenson] play and a bunch of the [Bomb the Music Industry!] and [The Arrogant Sons of Bitches] guys were there. I told them I had a bunch of songs and was just going to make another bedroom EP, and they were all like, "Why would you do that? Why don’t we just do it?" and I was like, "But then you'll have to learn all these songs, and we'll have to record it." And they were still saying, "Fuck yeah! Let's just do it." Which was the opposite reaction I had received in the past, and it felt great. This more so than any other record, we all contributed, we did it all ourselves, we're all on every song doing things.

== Release ==
Adults!!! was released on February 8, 2010. Initially released as an EP, the band has more recently acknowledged the record as a "mini-album", similar to To Leave or Die in Long Island. Upon release there was no set cover art for the album; instead eight different versions of cover art showed up randomly on the Quote Unquote download page, each featuring a color filtered photograph of someone who appears on the album with the word "ADULTS!" across the cover. When the album was released on vinyl by Really Records, a ninth image in the same style was used as the cover. Throughout February 2010, the band went on an East Coast tour, and performed at Harvest of Hope Fest the following month. In July and August 2010, the band went on a US tour.

== Reception ==
Professional ratings
Review scores
Source	Rating
Exclaim!	positive

Exclaim! named Adults!... No. 10 in their Punk Albums of 2010. Exclaim! writer Ben Conoley said "Listening to the album is like attending a really exciting party where everyone is extremely fun but equally self-aware and well-read. Even with a little melancholy, BTMI! reminds us of how much fun life is."

== Track listing ==
1. "You Still Believe in Me?" – 4:00
2. "Planning My Death" – 1:57
3. "Slumlord" – 2:36
4. "All Ages Shows" – 4:20
5. "Big Ending" – 0:29
6. "The First Time I Met Sanawon" – 3:26
7. "Struggler" – 4:52

== Personnel ==
- Jeff Rosenstock – vocals, guitars, saxophone, keyboards
- John DeDomenici – bass
- Tom Malinowski – guitar
- Matt Keegan – trombone, vocals
- Mike Costa – drums
- Laura Stevenson – vocals
- Neil Callaghan – farfisa organ
- Christine Mackie – glockenspiel, vocals
