= Chris Farren (punk musician) =

American rock musician

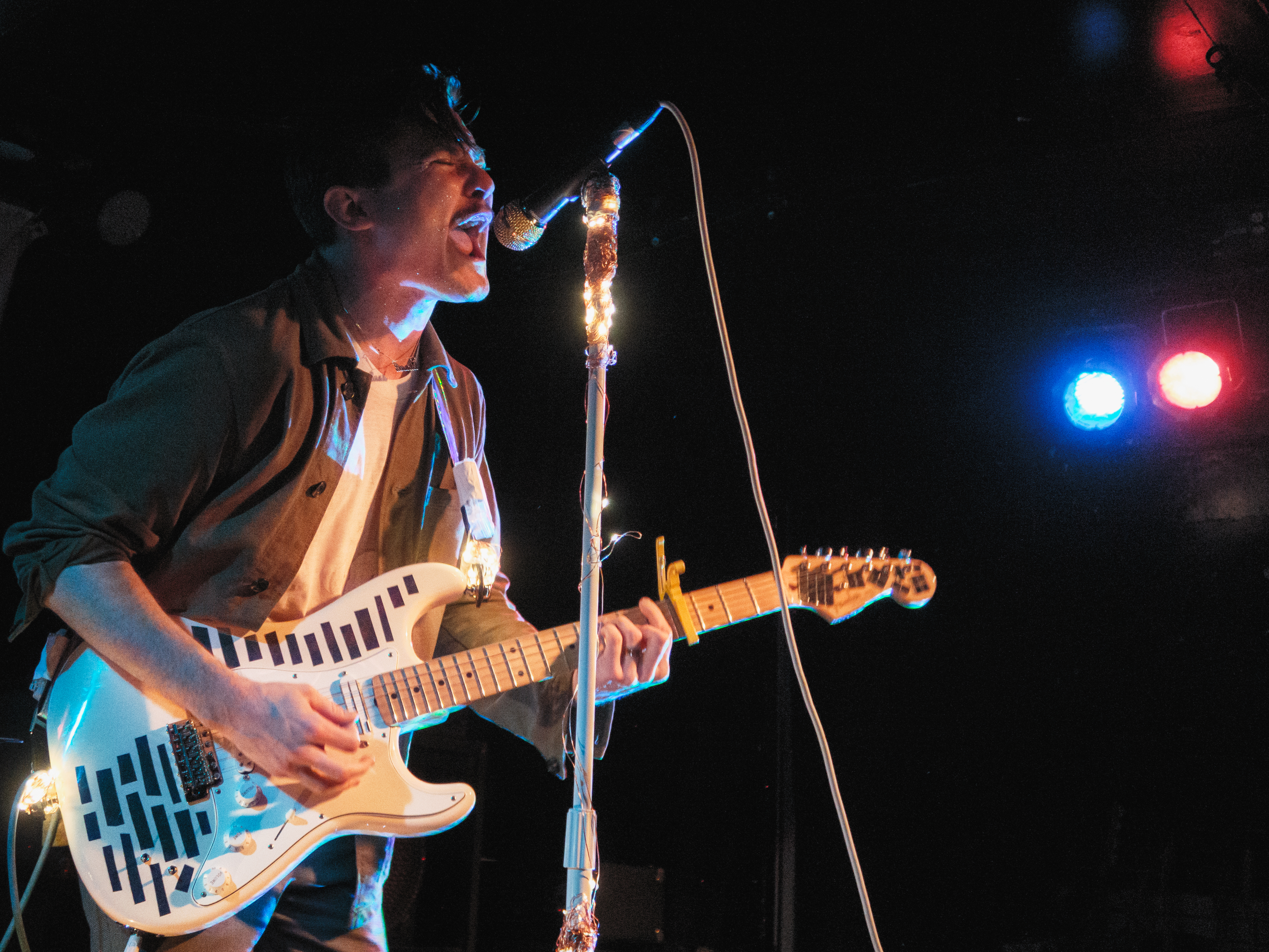
- Chris Farren in 2020

Background information
- Born: Chris Farren; April 29, 1986 (age 40)
- Genres: indie rock, pop punk, punk, indie pop
- Occupations: Singer, songwriter
- Instruments: Vocals, guitar, keyboards, drum machine, piano
- Years active: 2007–present
- Labels: Polyvinyl, Big Scary Monsters
- Member of: Antarctigo Vespucci
- Formerly of: Fake Problems

Christopher Richard Farren (born April 29, 1986) is an American musician originally from Naples, Florida. He was born in Michigan, where he lived until the age of 7, before relocating to Florida with his family. He is known for his work in the bands Fake Problems and Antarctigo Vespucci and as a solo artist.

== Career ==
In 2005, Farren formed the indie rock band Fake Problems with local friends in Naples. The band would release 3 studio albums and several EPs before officially breaking up in 2014, following guitarist Casey Lee's departure from the band in 2012.

In 2014, Farren began selling a The Smiths parody t-shirt that featured a photo of actor Will Smith, actress Jada Pinkett Smith, and their two children Jaden and Willow. Following an appearance on The Tonight Show Starring Jimmy Fallon, in which Fallon gifted Farren's shirt to Will Smith, the shirt became fairly popular online.

After the dissolution of Fake Problems, Farren would go on to release a collaborative EP with Jeff Rosenstock titled Soulmate Stuff as the band Antarctigo Vespucci. Since 2014, Antarctigo Vespucci has released 2 full-length albums and 2 EPs.

Farren released an album of all-original Christmas songs titled Like A Gift From God Or Whatever in 2014, with tracks featuring other artists such as Sean Bonnette, Laura Stevenson, and Mae Whitman.

In 2016, Farren released his debut solo album, Can't Die, through SideOneDummy Records.

In 2018 and again in 2020, Farren would compose music for two episodes of the Cartoon Network cartoon, Craig of the Creek with the show's composer and Farren's frequent collaborator, Jeff Rosenstock.

His second solo album, Born Hot, was released on October 11, 2019 on Polyvinyl Records. In 2019, Farren announced The Born Hot Tour, his first headline tour as a solo musician. The tour began in January 2020 and concluded in February 2020 with a sold out concert in Los Angeles.

== Discography ==
=== Fake Problems ===
==== Studio albums ====
- 2007: How Far Our Bodies Go (Sabot Productions)
- 2009: It's Great to Be Alive (SideOneDummy Records)
- 2010: Real Ghosts Caught on Tape (SideOneDummy Records)

==== EPs ====
- 2001: Too Much Like Home (For Documentation Only Records)
- 2004: From a Fashion Standpoint (For Documentation Only Records)
- 2005: Oh No! (self-released)
- 2006: Spurs & Spokes (Sabot Productions)
- 2006: Spurs & Spokes/Bull Matador (Sabot Productions)
- 2008: Viking Wizard Eyes Wizard Full Of Lies (Good Friends Records)
- 2013: Sugar EP (Fake Problems)

==== 7" Singles ====
- 2009: Dream Team (SideOneDummy Records)
- 2010: Soulless (SideOneDummy Records)
- 2011: Songs For Teenagers (SideOneDummy Records)
- 2015: Strange Emotions: Holy Attitude (self-released)

=== Antarctigo Vespucci ===
==== Studio albums ====
- 2015: Leavin' La Vida Loca (Quote Unquote Records)
- 2018: Love in the Time of E-Mail (Polyvinyl Records)

==== EPs ====
- 2014: Soulmate Stuff (Quote Unquote Records)
- 2014: I'm So Tethered (Quote Unquote Records)

=== Solo ===
==== Studio albums ====
- 2014: Like A Gift From God Or Whatever (self-released)
- 2016: Can't Die (SideOneDummy Records)
- 2019: Born Hot (Polyvinyl Records)
- 2022: Death Don't Wait (Original Motion Picture Soundtrack) (Polyvinyl Records)
- 2023: Doom Singer (Polyvinyl Records)

==== 7" Singles ====
- 2015: Where U Are (Boyfriend Island Records)
- 2020: FALL IN LOVE2NIGHT / PHANTOM FRIEND (Polyvinyl Records)

==== Non-Album Singles ====
- 2014: Ducks Fly Together (Chris Farren+Grey Gordon Split)
- 2017: Be There 4 Ya (self-released)
- 2018: The Way That I Love U Has Changed (self-released)
- 2025: Cause of Death (Polyvinyl Records)
