= Album Minus Band =

Studio album by Bomb the Music Industry!
- Released: February 14, 2005
- Genre: Ska punk; punk rock
- Length: 31:14
- Label: Quote Unquote
- Producer: Bomb the Music Industry!; Jeff Rosenstock

Bomb the Music Industry! chronology
Album Minus Band (2005)	To Leave or Die in Long Island (2005)

Album Minus Band is the debut full-length album from DIY collective Bomb the Music Industry! It was recorded by ex-Arrogant Sons of Bitches frontman, Jeff Rosenstock, in a bedroom. The album contains "Unlicensed cover songs. Unlicensed audio samples. Great times." It is available for free download on the band's website, as well as on Quote Unquote Records’ website. The title of this record would go on to inspire the name of a fan-sourced tribute album entitled "Album Minus Jeff". It was released on vinyl for the first time in 2008 through Asbestos Records.

In a 2015 interview Rosenstock said "This record was kind of terrifying to make, but it was also really honest. It's a really fucked up sounding, pure record from someone who doesn’t know how to use a thing, recording-wise. It got me out of whatever shitty path I was on had I not done this." Rosenstock continued: "I think this record is the spirit of the whole Bomb the Music Industry! thing. If you can't afford something, or there's a bunch of shit in your way, fuck it! Just make a record anyway. Just write songs and do your thing. There's not a record that encapsulates that more than this one."

== Details ==
"Future 86" contains back-up vocals by The Know How and a group of about 100 fans. It was originally written for singer/guitarist Jeff Rosenstock's previous band, The Arrogant Sons of Bitches.

"Big Plans of Sleeping In" contains a sample from the film Shaun of the Dead.

"Sweet Home Cananada" was recorded using only the built-in microphone on Rosenstock's computer. It uses "no electric guitars or bass... just distorted acoustic guitars". It also contains a sample from comedian David Cross’s album, Shut Up You Fucking Baby.

"Funcoland vs. the Southern Electorate" was covered by Rick Johnson Rock and Roll Machine for the President's Day Split.

"I'm Too Cooooool for Music" contains a sample from the TV show Arrested Development.

== Track listing ==
All songs written by Jeff Rosenstock except where noted.

No.	Title	Length
1.	"Blow Your Brains Out on Live TV!!!"	0:45
2.	"Does Your Face Hurt? No? 'Cause It's Killing Me!!!" (Sean Qualls, Jeff Rosenstock)	3:13
3.	"It Ceases to Be 'Whining' If You're Still 'Shitting Blood'"	2:20
4.	"Big Plans of Sleeping In"	2:00
5.	"I'm a Panic Bomb, Baby!"	2:15
6.	"Sweet Home Cananada"	4:28
7.	"Funcoland vs. the Southern Electorate"	0:50
8.	"Ready... Set... No!!!"	2:32
9.	"I'm Too Cooooool for Music"	2:19
10.	"Pike St. – Park Slope" (Harvey Danger cover)	3:27
11.	"Frrrreeeee Biiiiiiirrrrd!!!!!!!!! Frrrrreeeeeeeee Biiiiiiiiiirrrrrddd!!!!" (Jeff Rosenstock, Laura Stevenson)	2:09
12.	"Future 86"	4:54
Total length:		31:12
