= Scrambles =

Studio album by Bomb the Music Industry!
- Released: February 15, 2009
- Recorded: October–December 2008
- Genres: Punk rock, indie rock
- Length: 37:41
- Labels: Quote Unquote, Asian Man
- Producer: Bomb the Music Industry!

Bomb the Music Industry! chronology
Get Warmer (2007)	Scrambles (2009)	Adults!!!: Smart!!! Shithammered!!! And Excited by Nothing!!!!!!! (2010)

Scrambles is the fifth studio album by Bomb the Music Industry!, released on February 15, 2009. The album was released a year and a half after Get Warmer, making it the longest gap between the release of two chronologically adjacent Bomb the Music Industry! albums. Frontman Jeff Rosenstock aimed to record the album on a limited budget of $50; up to that point, the band had never spent that much money on the recording of an album.

In 2019, to celebrate the album's 10th anniversary, a compilation of demos for the album was released by Rosenstock.

== Recording and composition ==
In November 2007, the band announced they were in the demo and writing phase for their next album; alongside this, they posted a demo of "25" on their Myspace profile. A demo for "Fresh Attitude Young Body" was posted online on March 30, 2008, followed by several others for a limited time. In September 2008, the band played a few East Coast shows with the Riot Before. On October 6, 2008, the band entered the studio to start recording. A day prior, the group released the album's track listing and mentioned that the album would be released in early 2009. Frontman Jeff Rosenstock said it would contain "a ton of weird stuff on it." Recording concluded by December 2008 with the completion of gang vocals.

Like most of the band's records, several songs feature samples as transitions between tracks. A clip from Green Day's performance at Woodstock '94 is played at the end of "9/11 Fever!!!" A clip from Ol' Dirty Bastard's song "Dirt Dog" is sampled at the end of "25!" A clip from the movie Milk is played at the end of "It Shits!!!"

== Release ==
Towards the end of October 2008, the band went on an East Coast US tour with Shinobu, prior to a Canadian tour with Mustard Plug, leading up to an appearance at the Skanksgiving ‘08 festival. On January 7, 2009, the album's artwork and track listing were posted online. "Can I Pay My Rent in Fun?" was posted on Asian Man Records' Myspace profile on January 19, 2009. Following this, they embarked on a tour of the United Kingdom through to February 2009. The album originally was due out in January 2009, but it was delayed to issues with programs that were used to help record it. Scrambles was released digitally on February 15, 2009, for free through Quote Unquote Records, as well as being released physically on Asian Man Records. The physical version includes a 32-page zine by friends of the band including Latterman, Mustard Plug, Kaiju Big Battel, Bridge and Tunnel, and Cheeky. In March, the band appeared at the Harvest of Hope Fest. They went on a short tour of Florida in May 2009 with Fake Problems; it was bookended by other shows on the East Coast throughout the month. In June and July 2009, they went on a cross-country US tour with Laura Stevenson and the Cans. During this trek, the band released a split 7-inch with Stevenson and her band. On August 7, 2009, a music video was released for "Wednesday Night Drinkball", which was directed by Bryan Schlam. Shortly after this, they performed at The Fest in October 2009.

=== Demos ===
On February 15, 2019 (the ten year anniversary of the original release of Scrambles); Rosenstock announced the release of a collection of demos on Twitter. Along with a link to the demos and the original album, there was a short piece of writing where he reflected on the creation and release of Scrambles. He concluded with "Thanks for reading, listening, and giving a shit. – Jeff". The demos appear to only feature Rosenstock. Several of the tracks contain musical and lyrical differences from their finished versions; "Cold Chillin' Cold Chillin'" is performed almost entirely on unadorned acoustic guitar and vocals, "It Shits!!!" contains different chords and lyrics, and "Wednesday Night Drinkball" lacks its climactic coda.

== Reception ==
Professional ratings
Review scores
Source	Rating
Alternative Press	5/5 stars
Exclaim!	4.5/5 stars
Punknews.org	4/5 stars

Reviews of the album have praised its perceived cohesiveness and clever lyrics. One reviewer wrote that, "Rosenstock's songwriting, which has always been quirky and introspective, is at its best here, mixing the personal and the humorous, and finding the difficult balance." Another reviewer declared that "Jeff Rosenstock is slowly becoming the only voice in punk that matters."

== Track listing ==
No.	Title	Length
1.	"Cold Chillin' Cold Chillin'"	1:45
2.	"Stuff That I Like"	2:53
3.	"It Shits!!!"	2:42
4.	"Fresh Attitude Young Body"	3:38
5.	"Wednesday Night Drinkball"	2:30
6.	"25!"	2:47
7.	"$2,400,000"	5:58
8.	"Gang of Four Meets the Stooges (but Boring)"	1:11
9.	"9/11 Fever!!!"	1:43
10.	"(Shut) Up the Punx!!!"	2:34
11.	"Can I Pay My Rent in Fun?"	3:01
12.	"Saddr Weirdr"	2:38
13.	"Sort of Like Being Pumped"	4:29
Total length:		37:41

== Personnel ==
- Sean Bonnette – vocals (track 5)
- Neil Callaghan – melodica (track 13)
- Mike Campbell – omnichord (track 1)
- Chris Candy – trumpet (track 10)
- Mike Costa – drums (all tracks except 1)
- John DeDomenici – bass (all tracks except 1, 6, 7, 10)
- Dino – vocals (track 3)
- Kepi Ghoulie – vocals (track 3)
- Joel Hatstat – sleigh bells (track 1)
- Rick Johnson – theremin (track 7), bass (track 10)
- Matt Keegan – trombone (tracks 1, 10, 13)
- Christine Mackie – bells (tracks 1, 13), claps (track 4)
- Tom Malinowski – guitar (tracks 4, 6, 8, 12)
- Sean McCabe – trombone (tracks 1, 10, 13)
- Jeff Rosenstock – vocals (all tracks), guitar (all tracks), piano (tracks 1, 4, 5, 6), saxophone (track 1), tenor saxophone (tracks 10, 13), keyboards (tracks 3, 10, 11, 12), claps (track 4), synthesizer (tracks 4, 6, 11, 12), wurlitzer (tracks 4, 5, 7), mellotron (tracks 5), key bass (tracks 6, 12), fuzz bass (track 7), bells (track 11)
- Laura Stevenson – vocals, banjo (track 13)
