= Kudrow (band) =

American indie rock band

- Origin: Brooklyn, New York, United States
- Genre: Punk rock
- Years active: 2009–present
- Label: Quote Unquote
- Members: Jeff Rosenstock; Mike Campbell; Dave Garwacke
- Website: Official site

Kudrow is an indie rock band based in Brooklyn. Its members are Jeff Rosenstock of Bomb the Music Industry!, Mike Campbell of Latterman, and Dave Garwacke of If You Make It. One show featured Lee Hartney on lead guitar.

The band released their debut EP, Lando, in November 2009. Their next release was a split EP with Hard Girls.

Their sound has been described as "noisy indie rock" and compared to Superchunk and Archers of Loaf.
