= Goodbye Cool World! =

Album by Bomb the Music Industry!

Goodbye Cool World

Studio album by Bomb the Music Industry!
- Released: June 13, 2006
- Genre: Ska punk
- Length: 34:35
- Label: Quote Unquote
- Producer: Bomb the Music Industry!

Bomb the Music Industry! chronology
President's Day Split 7" (2006)	Goodbye Cool World (2006)	Get Warmer (2007)

Professional ratings
Review scores
Source	Rating
Punknews.org	4.5/5 stars

Goodbye Cool World! is the third release by DIY collective Bomb the Music Industry!. It was released on the band's website, as well as on a limited vinyl release. The album's working title was reported to be Clap Your Hands Say Shut the Fuck Up, parodying indie rock band Clap Your Hands Say Yeah, but was changed to the current title because, according to Bomb the Music Industry!, "A band selling 50,000 records without a label, regardless of hype or bad music, is kinda dope."

- "King of Minneapolis" is a four-part song, based on singer/guitarist Jeff Rosenstock spending a night at the Triple Rock Social Club in Minneapolis.
- "King of Minneapolis", "Grudge Report", and a B-side titled "Tell My Boss 'I Hate You'" were originally part of a concept record that was abandoned in favor of this album.
- The album uses several samples, including a clip from the Arrested Development episode "The One Where Michael Leaves" at the beginning of "Old and Unprofessional", a clip from the 1983 movie Valley Girl at the end of "My Response to an Article in Alternative Press", and a clip of the game Galaga at the end of "Anywhere I Lay My Head".
- "Side Projects are Never Successful" makes a reference to Washington, D.C. post-hardcore outfit Fugazi.

== Track listing ==
- All songs written by Jeff Rosenstock except "Anywhere I Lay My Head" by Tom Waits.
1. "Old and Unprofessional" – 0:53
2. "King of Minneapolis, Pts I and II" – 3:26
  - I. "Drank Myself to Death" – 1:29
  - II. "True 'til College" – 1:57
3. "Even Winning Feels Bad" – 3:58
4. "Side Projects Are Never Successful" – 4:13
5. "5 Funerals" – 2:53
6. "My Response to an Article in Alternative Press" – 2:13
7. "Sorry, Brooklyn. Dancing Won't Solve Anything." – 4:56
8. "It’s Official! We're Borrrrring!" – 2:15
9. "From Martyrdom to Star(tyr)dom" – 2:23
10. "All Alone in My Big Empty Apartment" – 2:19
11. "Fuck the Fans" – 0:29
12. "Grudge Report" – 4:12
13. "King of Minneapolis, Pts. III and IV" – 3:14
  - III. "OK Hangover" – 1:38
  - IV. "Cecil Otter Tattoo" – 1:35
14. "Anywhere I Lay My Head" – 2:04
