= Antarctigo Vespucci =

American indie rock band

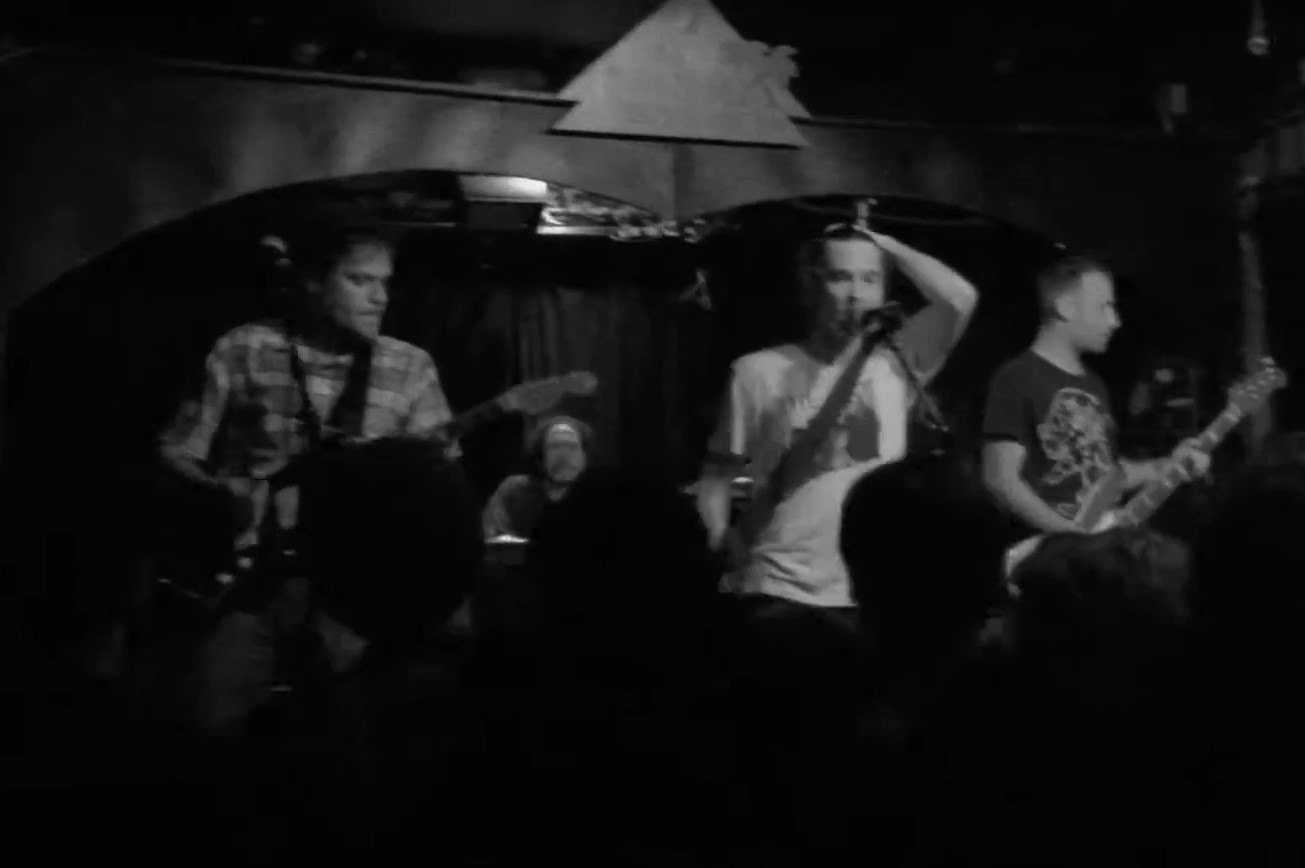
- Antarctigo Vespucci performing in 2014

Background information
- Origin: Florida and New York, United States
- Genres: Power pop, indie rock
- Years active: 2014-Present
- Labels: Quote Unquote, Really Records, Asian Man, Polyvinyl, Big Scary Monsters
- Members: Chris Farren; Jeff Rosenstock

Antarctigo Vespucci is an American indie rock band, formed in 2014. The band is composed of punk musicians Chris Farren and Jeff Rosenstock.

The band explains their name as a joke: "Amerigo Vespucci is the guy who discovered America so it stands to reason that Antarctigo Vespucci would be the guy who discovered Antarctica."

In an interview with Uproxx, the band explained that their creative process when making a new Antarctigo Vespucci album typically begins with demos from Farren. According to the duo, Rosenstock will pick out the demos that stick out to him the most, then the two will collaborate on the finished product. In a 2019 Reddit AMA, Farren explained, "The difference between Chris Farren songs and AV songs is Jeff Rosenstock produces the AV songs. And a lot of the times in AV we will completely deconstruct a song and build it back up for fun."

== History ==
=== Origin and formation ===
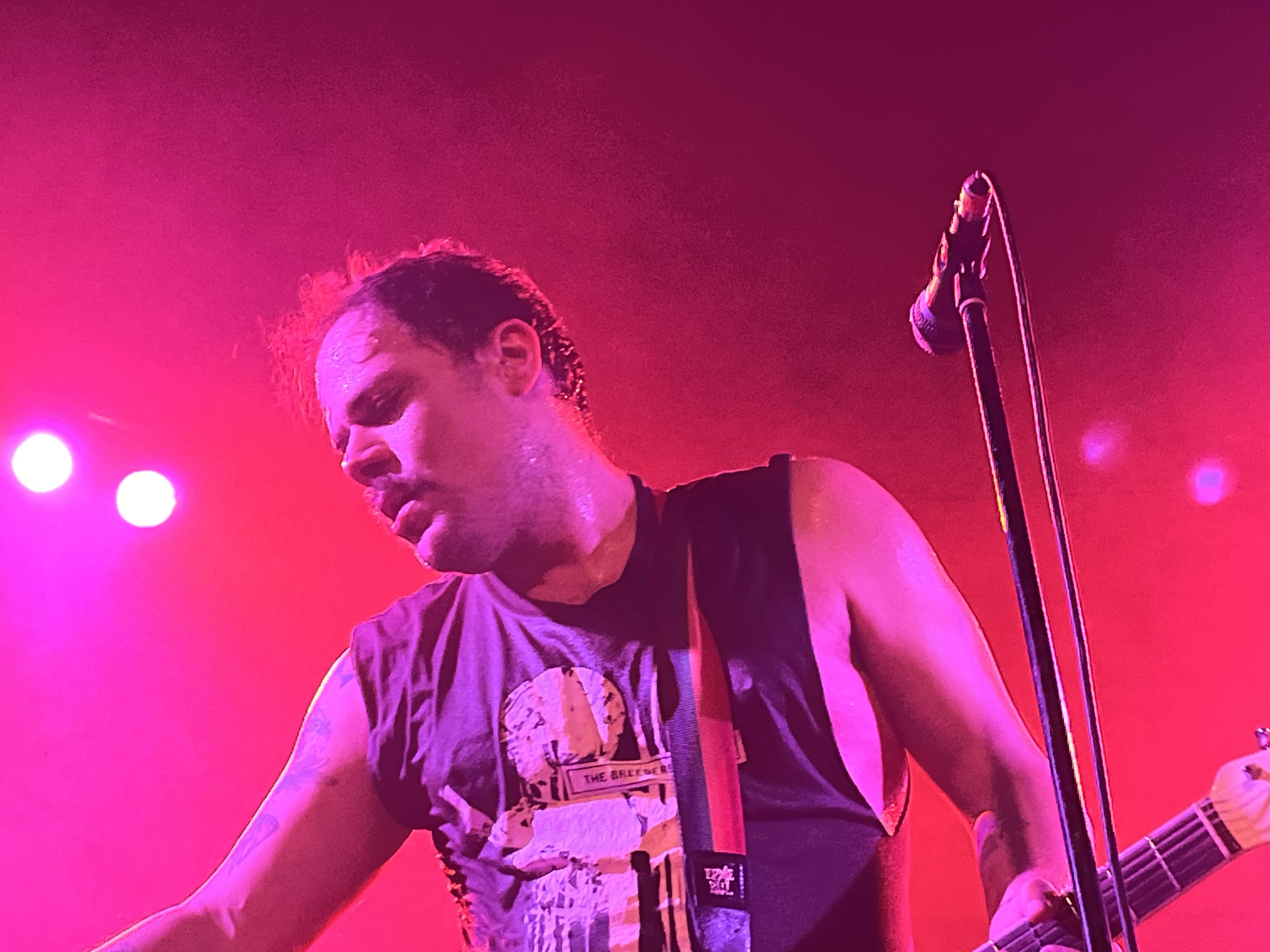
Jeff Rosenstock performing in 2024 at Mr. Smalls Theater in Pittsburgh.

Antarctigo Vespucci was formed in 2013, just as Farren's band Fake Problems was breaking up and Rosenstock's band Bomb the Music Industry! was on a farewell tour. Farren and Rosenstock had crossed paths on tour before, but were barely more than acquaintances at the time that they began collaborating on what would later become the band's debut EP Soulmate Stuff, released in early 2014. The title of the EP was intended to allude to the instant connection both artists felt with one another.

Farren and Rosenstock would write, produce, and play most of the instruments on Soulmate Stuff themselves, with Farren on lead vocals and Benny Horowitz of The Gaslight Anthem on drums. Shortly after the release of Soulmate Stuff, the band released their second EP, I'm So Tethered, in late 2014.

=== Back to the Island ===
While working on Soulmate Stuff and I'm So Tethered, Farren and Rosenstock would begin a podcast in which they re-watched episodes of the 2004 drama television show, LOST, called Back to the Island. One of the main elements of the podcast are "theme songs" created by Farren, Rosenstock, or in collaboration with one another. The songs are often short, typically under a minute long. Combined, the duo have created over 220 songs for the podcast.

The podcast occasionally features other musicians as guests, including members of Antarctigo Vespucci's touring band, Laura Stevenson and John DeDomenici. In 2020, during the COVID-19 pandemic, the duo would re-tool the podcast to be about watching Batman movies and re-name it Bat to the I Man. In February 2021 the podcast was again re-tooled, this time to focus on the 2019 CW television series Batwoman, and was re-named Bat Wo (The I) Man.

=== Leavin' La Vida Loca ===
In 2015, the band released their first full-length album, Leavin' La Vida Loca on Rosenstock's pay what you want label, Quote Unquote Records. The band described their debut album as "dreamy beachy pop-punk with catchy hooks," and "apartment power-pop," likely in reference to the album having been largely recorded and produced in a small bedroom in Rosenstock's Brooklyn apartment.

That year, Antarctigo Vespucci performed at the Gainesville, Florida punk music festival The Fest. Stereogum listed Antarctigo Vespucci one of the top 50 new bands of 2015, and described Leavin' La Vida Loca as marking "a progression toward a more concrete project," in contrast to their previous EP releases.

In 2016, the band released a limited-run compilation vinyl, The Essential Antarctigo Vespucci Vol. 1 with Asian Man Records. The vinyl included tracks from the then-out-of-press EPs, Soulmate Stuff and I'm So Tethered, as well as a few unreleased tracks.

=== Love in the Time of E-Mail ===
In August 2018, it was announced that the band had signed to Polyvinyl Record Co.

In October 2018, the band released their second full-length album, Love in the Time of E-Mail. Stereogum described the album's debut single, "White Noise," as "crunchy and concise" and the album as "bracing, fun, deeply catchy" and "more about love than email." In their 4.5/5 review, New Noise Magazine noted that on Love in the Time of E-Mail, "while the music is poppy and upbeat, the lyrics don’t shy away from heavier subject matter."

Leading up to the release of the album, the band released their first music video for the song "Freakin' U Out." The video depicts Farren and Rosenstock celebrating "100 Years of Antarctigo Vespucci."

Along with the release of Love in the Time of E-Mail, the band announced the Live! In the Time of E-Mail tour with the punk band Katie Ellen in November 2018. In early 2019, the band then toured the west coast of the United States with the band AJJ.

== Discography ==
=== Studio albums ===
- 2015: Leavin' La Vida Loca (Quote Unquote Records)
- 2018: Love in the Time of E-Mail (Polyvinyl Records)

=== EPs ===
- 2014: Soulmate Stuff (Quote Unquote Records)
- 2014: I'm So Tethered (Quote Unquote Records)

=== Compilation albums ===
- 2016: The Essential Antarctigo Vespucci Vol. 1 (Asian Man Records)

== Music videos ==
- 2018: "Freakin' U Out" (dir. Clay Tatum)
