= Chumped =

American band

- Origin: Brooklyn, New York, U.S.
- Genres: Pop punk; emo; indie rock; punk rock
- Years active: 2012–16
- Labels: Anchorless Records
- Spinoffs: Katie Ellen
- Past members: Anika Pyle; Drew Johnson; Doug McKeever; Dan Frelly
- Website: www.chumped.bandcamp.com

Chumped was an American pop punk band based in Brooklyn, New York, United States. The band formed in 2012, and released two extended plays before releasing their sole LP, Teenage Retirement, in 2014 on Anchorless Records. The band announced an "indefinite hiatus" in 2015 and performed their final show in February 2016.

== History ==
Pyle, Johnson and Frelly moved to New York City from Monument, Colorado, where Pyle met New Jersey resident Doug McKeever while working at the Fort Greene farmers market. The band released their debut, self-titled EP in October 2013 on Anchorless Records. Dan Ozzi wrote in Vice that it was "the best pop-punk debut you will hear all year," and Melissa Fossum dubbed it the best album of 2013 in her submission to the Pazz & Jop that year. During this time, Chumped shared the stage with bands such as Iron Chic, Cayetana, Lee Hartney Sex Drive, Benny The Jet Rodriguez, Elway, Modern Baseball, and Saves the Day during a surprise late-night performance of Through Being Cool in September 2013 at Saint Vitus Bar in Brooklyn.

That's the Thing is Like... was released in September 2014, which featured "Hot 97 Summer Jam", the first single from their forthcoming LP Teenage Retirement. It coincided with a performance at the Riot Fest in Chicago alongside Weezer, Slayer, NOFX, The Get Up Kids, Lemuria and many more. Chumped released their debut full-length album Teenage Retirement on November 18, 2014 (Anchorless Records), titled after the band some members played in prior to Chumped's formation. The album's sound has been compared to that of Superchunk, Nirvana, and Slingshot Dakota. A music video for "December is the Longest Month" was released in December 2014. In November the band embarked on a month-long headlining tour.

In February 2015, Chumped toured Europe and the UK. Also in February 2015, Joel Tannenbaum (Plow United, Ex Friends) and Mikey Erg (The Ergs!, The Dopamines) formed a new project called The Rentiers which features Anika Pyle (Chumped) and Tyler Pursel (Goddamnit, Gym Class Heroes). Their debut EP Here Is A List Of Things That Exist will be released on March 24, 2015 via Square of Opposition and Death to False Hope, and can be streamed in its entirety via SoundCloud. Chumped toured with Andrew Jackson Jihad, The Smith Street Band, and Jeff Rosenstock on their full United States tour during Spring 2015, followed by supporting The Menzingers for three weeks in June 2015.

Chumped announced its indefinite hiatus its social media accounts in October 2015, initially choosing to play one last show in Gainesville, Florida, on November 1. Andrew Unterberger at Spin considered the announcement "an unexpectedly abrupt end one of the most promising young careers in DIY punk." The band played their final show on February 6, 2016 in Brooklyn with Jeff Rosenstock, Adult Dude and Chris Gethard's Smiths tribute band.

== Discography ==
=== Albums ===
| Title | Album details |
|---|---|
| Teenage Retirement | Released: November 18, 2014; Label: Anchorless |

=== Extended plays ===
| Title | Album details |
|---|---|
| Chumped | Released: October 8, 2013; Label: Anchorless |
| That's the Thing Is Like... | Released: September 9, 2014; Label: Anchorless |

== Band members ==
Former members

- Anika Pyle – guitar, vocals (2012–2016)
- Dan Frelly – drums (2012–2016)
- Drew Johnson – guitar (2012–2016)
- Doug McKeever – bass guitar (2012–2016)
