= Walter Etc. =

American folk punk band

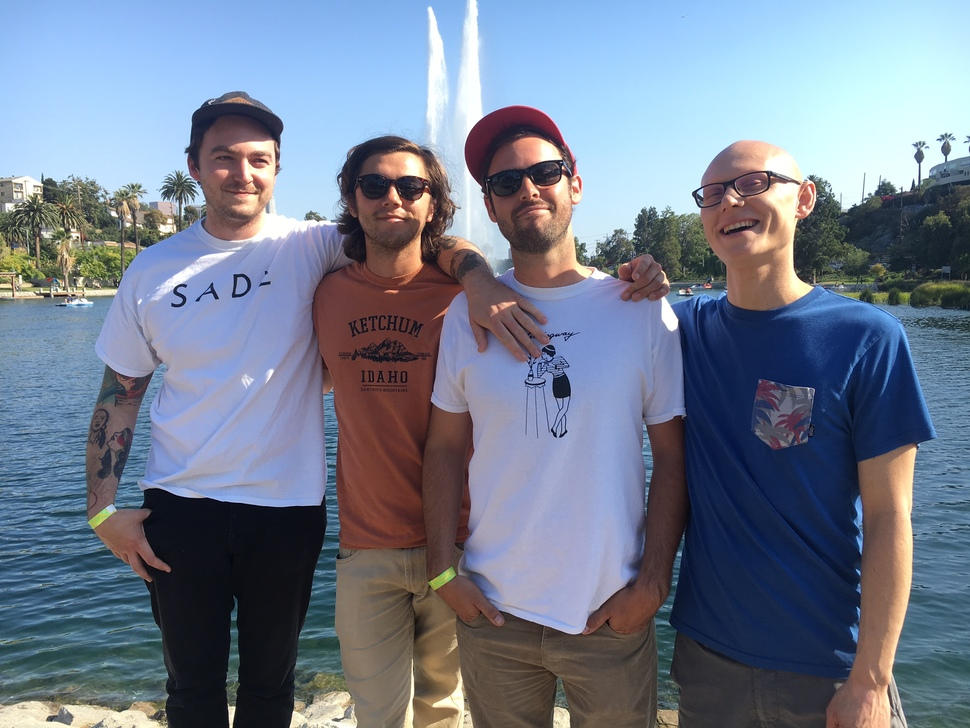
Walter Etc. (2017)

Walter Etc. (alternatively known as Walter Mitty and His Makeshift Orchestra) is an American folk punk band based in Ventura, California.

The band was formed in 2009 by childhood friends Dustin Cole Hayes, Kris Schobert and Jake Lee, though has had multiple varied lineups. Following the release of their fourth album Well Soon, the band took a hiatus, before reforming in 2016 as Walter Etc.

The latest album produced under the name Walter Etc., When The Band Breaks Up Again, was released in 2023 via SideOneDummy Records. In 2025, Hayes announced the end of the hiatus for Walter Mitty and His Makeshift Orchestra, sharing on social media that the group had recorded a new album under their old name and buried a copy in the California desert, only to be released if it could be found. The cassette tape was uncovered by a fan within hours, and the album Yikes Almighty was released on July 18, 2025 via Lauren Records.

The band has provided support for Modern Baseball and Knuckle Puck while on tour in the United States. They also provided support for Jeff Rosenstock on his European tour in 2024.

== Discography ==
Walter Etc.
| Release date | Title | Label |
|---|---|---|
| September 8, 2023 | When The Band Breaks Up Again | SideOneDummy Records |
| May 7, 2021 | There There | Making New Enemies |
| March 27, 2020 | Dark Comedy Performance Piece of My Life | Making New Enemies |
| December 12, 2018 | Chaparral | Counter Intuitive Records |
| August 24, 2017 | Gloom Cruise | Lame-O Records |
| May 13, 2017 | Split (with Diners (music)) | Lauren Records |
| January 4, 2017 | Always Leaving | Making New Enemies |
| May 17, 2013 | Psalms From Rainy Day Land | Making New Enemies |
| October 7, 2012 | Fawned Of Gargoyles | Making New Enemies |
| January 23, 2012 | By Golly | Making New Enemies |
| November 1, 2010 | Grunts and Groans from Reptar's Belly | Making New Enemies |

Walter Mitty and His Makeshift Orchestra
| | Title | Label |
|---|---|---|
| July 18, 2025 | Yikes Almighty | Lauren Records |
| September 6, 2019 | Puddles of Alligators | Making New Enemies |
| July 21, 2014 | Well Soon | Making New Enemies |
| November 20, 2011 | Overwhelmed and Underdressed | Making New Enemies |
| September 29, 2010 | Cliché Definitions of Success | Making New Enemies |
| January 1, 2009 | Every Town Needs A Cowboy | Making New Enemies |
