= Chris Farren =

Chris Farren may refer to:

- Chris Farren (country musician), American country musician
- Chris Farren (punk musician) (born 1986), American punk musician
