= Frown Line =

Canadian indie rock band

- Origin: Ottawa, Canada
- Genres: Indie rock
- Years active: 2020–present
- Label: Lauren Records
- Members: Annika Devlin; Juan Jimenez; Jacob Barton; Jack Moore
- Past members: Owen Viragos; Lucy Grant
- Website: frownline.bandcamp.com

Frown Line is a Canadian indie rock band from Ottawa, now based in Montreal. The band consists of lead singer and rhythm guitarist Annika Devlin, bassist Juan Jimenez, guitarist Jacob Barton and drummer Jack Moore. The band is currently signed to Lauren Records.

== History ==
Frown Line began in 2020 during the COVID-19 pandemic after then 19 year old lead singer Annika Devlin wrote her first song, titled "September", for the project. The band released their first EP in 2023 titled Come Around. The group released a collection of unreleased songs on August 11, 2025. The band will release their debut album in 2027.

== Discography ==
EPs

- Come Around (2023, Lauren Records)

Compilations

- What's Leftover (2025, Lauren Records)
