= Good Luck (band) =

Pop punk band from Bloomington, Indiana

- Origin: Bloomington, Indiana, U.S.
- Genres: Pop-punk, folk-punk, emo, indie rock
- Years active: 2008–2012; 2018; 2024–present
- Labels: No Idea Records, Lauren Records
- Members: Ginger Alford; Mike Harpring; Matt Tobey

Good Luck is a pop-punk band from Bloomington, Indiana. The band is composed of three members: Ginger Alford, Matt Tobey and Mike Harpring. The band released two studio albums, Into Lake Griffy in 2008 and Without Hesitation in 2011, along with an EP in 2010. The band was no longer actively touring or producing new music, although the band's social media pages are maintained and updated with occasional performances and information on other projects worked on by band members.

However, in 2024, they reformed and released their third studio album, Big Dreams, Mister, the following year.

== History ==
=== Formation ===
The band grew out of the folk-punk scene in Bloomington, IN. The band discovered their name on the front steps of a fraternity house in Bloomington, from the phrase 'Good Luck Riders,' in reference to the Little 500, an annual bike race at Indiana University. Band member Ginger Alford has described the name as giving off "a good clear message.”

According to writer David Anthony of The A.V. Club, the Good Luck developed a different sound than many other folk-punk bands in the area:

"While many Bloomington bands were excelling in acoustic guitars and ramshackle recordings, Good Luck felt like a maturation of that movement, bringing in a technical ability that superseded its peers but didn’t take away from its ability to make fans feel at home in its songs."

=== Into Lake Griffy (2008) ===
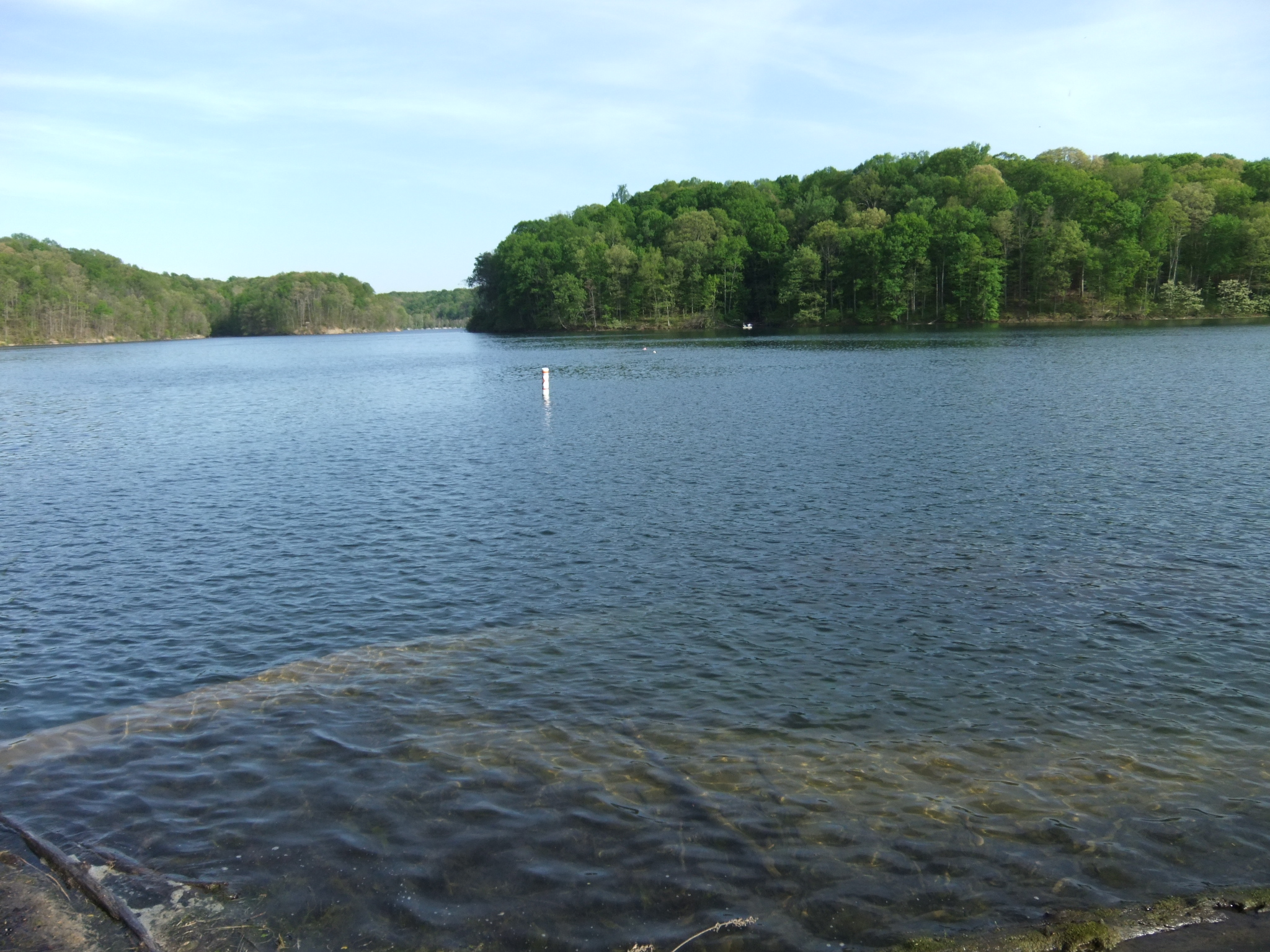
Griffy Lake, the reservoir the album is named after.

The first work done together by the group resulted in their inaugural album, Into Lake Griffy in 2008. The album was recorded between February and April 2008 at Russian Recording in Nashville, IN. The album was recorded, engineered, and mixed by Mike Bridavsky, the owner of celebrity cat Lil Bub. It was self-released on May 18, 2008, by the band online and as a CD. On March 8, 2009, No Idea Records released a digital and LP version of the album.

The album was well-received within folk-punk, pop-punk, emo and indie rock communities, resulting in enough national attention to support multiple US tours and one international tour. Reviewers from Punknews.org called it "the best album [they've] heard this year." Reviewer Ian Sallee from independent publication Mind Equals Blown said of their work:

"Most people associate Good Luck with just being a great punk band, but they will have their socks literally knocked off of them after listening to Into Lake Griffy... Matt Tobey, Ginger Alford, and Mike Harpring were all accomplished musicians prior to the forming of Good Luck. But their balance and collaborative efforts have led them down a path of righteousness, into territory that no pop or punk band has charted before."

Sputnikmusic gave the album an excellent review, saying "Good Luck's influence are too many to count which makes for a beautifully unique and full album."

The album's name is a reference to Griffy Lake, a reservoir in the city of Bloomington, Indiana.

=== Demonstration 2010 and Without Hesitation (2011) ===
On March 13, 2010, the band released a four-song EP entitled Demonstration 2010, for digital download and streaming on Bandcamp. It includes three original songs and a cover of the 1980s Prince song "When You Were Mine".

Following Demonstration 2010, the band released a second studio album, Without Hesitation, in 2011. The album was recorded mixed between March and July 2011 and released on October 26, also for streaming and digital download on Bandcamp. It was also released by No Idea Records as an LP, CD, and for digital download on November 22, 2011.

Unlike Into Lake Griffy, in which nearly all lyrics, vocals, and instrumentation were from the band's three members, Without Hesitation features writing and contributions from a number of other musicians and friends of the band, including Justin Hubler on piano and Toby Foster playing euphonium. It also features cover art by artist Nate Powell in collaboration with photographer Ben Rains. Without Hesitation received positive reviews from critics, including from punk zine Some Will Never Know, PunkRockTheory, and Under The Gun Review.

The members of the band have also produced a number of independent, solo, and collaborative work as members of other musical groups.

=== Big Dreams, Mister (2025) ===
On August 20, 2025, the band announced their third studio album, Big Dreams, Mister, to be released on October 17, 2025, via Lauren Records.

== Tours and live performances ==
Following the success of Into Lake Griffy, the band went on a number of tours, including a West Coast tour, East Coast tour and multiple tours in the Midwestern United States. They also completed a U.K. tour in 2008. The band has said they have a "subdued approach" to touring.

The band opened for Oregon-based indie band The Thermals in October 2010 at Rhino's Youth Media Center in Bloomington, IN.

Following the release of Without Hesitation, the band embarked on a tour throughout the Midwestern and Eastern United States in May, 2011. The tour included shows with Kind Of Like Spitting, Bomb The Music Industry!, Hop Along, and Algernon Cadwallader, among others.

While Good Luck was no longer an active band, they did still occasionally play a few shows. They played at Russian Recording's 15-year anniversary concert on June 30, 2018, in Bloomington, Indiana, in a rare group performance after effectively disbanding. Writing on Facebook and Twitter, "No, this is not a hoax" of the unexpected performance, the band indicated that while they may play more shows together in the future, they had no current plans to do so. In April 2024, Good Luck played their first show since 2018 in Philadelphia, then another in August 2024 in Brooklyn, New York supporting Jeff Rosenstock, followed by a live-streamed show in October 2024 at the Bloomington, Indiana venue Ducks in a Stack's 20th anniversary.

== Band members ==
- Ginger Alford – vocals, bass
- Mike Harpring – drums
- Matt Tobey – vocals, guitar, piano, clarinet, etc.

== Discography ==
Albums
Release date	Title	Label	Format
May 18, 2008	Into Lake Griffy	self-released in 2008; released by No Idea Records in 2009.	CD, digital download, LP
October 26, 2011	Without Hesitations	self-released online, and by No Idea Records	digital release
October 17, 2025	Big Dreams, Mister	released by Lauren Records	CD, digital download, LP

EPs
Release date	Title	Label	Format
March 13, 2010	Demonstration 2010	self-released; Yo Yo Records	digital release, LP
