= Get Warmer =

Studio album by Bomb the Music Industry!
- Released: July 31, 2007
- Genres: Ska punk, indie rock, power pop
- Length: 38:28
- Label: Quote Unquote
- Producer: Bomb the Music Industry!

Bomb the Music Industry! chronology
Goodbye Cool World! (2006)	Get Warmer (2007)	Scrambles (2009)

Professional ratings
Review scores
Source	Rating
AllMusic	(favorable)
NUVO	4/5 stars
Punknews.org	4/5 stars

Get Warmer is the fourth full-length album by DIY collective Bomb the Music Industry!.

== Recording and composition ==
Originally, the band were going to follow up 2006's Goodbye Cool World! with an EP entitled No No New York. This concept was abandoned in favor of recording this album. A song from the abandoned EP, entitled "The Soul Crushing Northeast" can be heard here. This was the first BtMI! album to feature a live band, which was made up of over 20 different musicians.

The title track makes references to both Tom Waits and the Wham! single "Wake Me Up Before You Go-Go". "No Rest for the Whiny" was previously titled "Screamin' for a Wage (a.k.a. 2006 World Series of Craig's List Failure)". Unlike previous Bomb the Music Industry! albums, Get Warmer uses phone messages as samples in between songs rather than quotes from movies and TV shows.

== Release ==
On July 31, 2007, Get Warmer was released as a free download from Quote Unquote Records' website. It was released on CD and vinyl through Asian Man on August 7. It was promoted with a cross-country US tour in September and October 2007, including an appearance at The Fest. They closed out the year with three shows supporting Anti-Flag. In February and March 2008, the band toured with Rosenstock's side project Pegasuses XL, and then embarked on an April 2008 tour with the Slackers. In May and June 2008, the band toured the US as part of the Asian Man Records Tour with various labelmates.

== Track listing ==
1. "Jobs Schmobs" – 1:58
2. "493 Ruth" – 2:44
3. "Bike Test 1 2 3" – 2:37
4. "Unlimited Breadsticks, Soup and Salad Days" – 2:32
5. "No Rest for the Whiny" – 3:26
6. "25 Hour Goddamn Telethon" – 2:20
7. "Depression Is No Fun" – 2:49
8. "I Don't Love You Anymore" – 4:42
9. "Pizza Claus Is Comin' to Town" – 3:11
10. "Never Trust a Man Without a Horribly Embarrassing Secret" – 3:55
11. "Get Warmer" – 6:50
12. "The Last Party (Foul)" – 1:17

== Personnel ==
- Jace Bartet – fuzz bass, vocals (track 2)
- Chuck Bradburn – string bass (track 11)
- Jason Calhoun – violin (track 11)
- Neil Callaghan – Farfisa organ (track 9)
- Michael Clancy – vocals (track 8)
- Al Daglis – vocals (track 2), saxophone (track 5)
- Ben Duncan – vocals (track 4)
- Luke Fields – baritone guitar (tracks 1, 2, 7, 11), banjo (track 4), countdown (track 6), vocals (tracks 8, 11)
- Joel Hastat – giant drum (tracks 1, 11), vocals (tracks 1, 2, 4, 8)
- Rick Johnson – bass (all tracks except 2 and 12)
- Matt Kurz – vocals (track 1), lead guitar (track 2)
- Christine Mackie – vocals (track 4)
- Sean McCabe – trombone (all tracks except 3, 4, 9, 10, 12), mandolin (track 4)
- Lolo Myers – vocals (track 1), cello (track 11)
- Sam Paulsen – countdown (track 6), vocals (tracks 8, 11)
- Andy Pruett – trumpet (tracks 1, 5, 6, 8)
- Jeff Rosenstock – guitar (all tracks), vocals (all tracks), bells (tracks 1, 3, 4), synthesizer (all tracks except 2, 4, 5, 12), saxophone (all tracks except 3, 4, 9, 10, 12), key bass (track 2), organ (tracks 2, 5–8), claps (track 2), piano (tracks 4, 7, 8, 11), ukulele (track 9)
- Brady Smith – drums (all tracks), sleigh bells (track 4)
- Scott Smith – cardboard box full of keys, double drum (track 1)
- Cara Beth Satalito – vocals (tracks 8, 10)
- Rob Thomason – whistle (track 8)
- Jeff Tobias – vocals (tracks 2, 6–8), claps (track 2)
