= Dogbreth =

American punk band

- Origin: Phoenix, Arizona
- Genres: Punk rock; power pop; indie rock
- Years active: 2009–present
- Labels: Asian Man; Lauren; No Idea
- Members: Tristan Jemsek; Raybear; Logan Greene; Ryan Petersavage; Ty Rutkowski
- Past members: Bill Palmer; Cesar Ruiz; Blue Broderick; JJ; Erin Wrench; Malia Seavey; Nathan Leach; Greg Hughes; Elle Murtagh; Col Bauer

Dogbreth is an American power pop band formed originally in Phoenix, Arizona in 2009 by main songwriter Tristan Jemsek. The band consists of Jemsek and an ever-revolving lineup of friends. They have released four full-length albums, the last couple of which were on Asian Man Records.

== History ==
Dogbreth, initially spelled Dogbreath, was formed in Phoenix Arizona in 2009. Initially intended to be a pop-punk trio where Jemsek, along with two friends from the downtown Phoenix punk scene - Austin Jackson and Brandon Scott Lemon - would each contribute songs and rotate instruments. Shortly after their first practice however, Jackson and Lemon moved away from the city. Jemsek chose to continue using the name Dogbreath for his songwriting, and in Winter of 2009 released an acoustic CD-R entitled Sickly Bright From Love. The ‘a’ was later dropped from the band name in an effort to distinguish itself from a Swedish band of the same name, as well as to pay homage to thrash metal pioneers Megadeth.

On 22 July 2011 Dogbreth released their debut album Chookie on Skulltula Records, engineered at Audioconfusion in Mesa, Arizona. It featured initial lineup of Tristan Jemsek on guitar and lead vocals, Blue Broderick on guitar and bass, drums by Alex Cardwell with additional vocals by Brianna Johnson and Erin Wrench (the latter of which would become the band's bassist).

After that lineup dissolved, Jemsek recorded Get Out - a 4-song EP, playing all the instruments, released on 7” by the Anxiety Machine label. Soon after, the band grew to a 4-piece for the first time with the addition of Erin Wrench (bass), Nathan Leach (drums), and Broderick rejoining, this time as lead guitarist.

This lineup went on to record Sentimental Health, the band’s second full-length album, released on 22 November 2013.

On 2 August 2016 the band's third full-length album Second Home was released on Asian Man Records. With members now split between Phoenix and Seattle following a cross-country move by Jemsek earlier that year. It featured additional guitars by new member Cesar Ruiz and drums by Elle Murtagh. The album received acclaim from publications such as SPIN and NPR, the latter of which called Jemsek’s songwriting “the work of punks who write youthful, larger-than-life songs that still wrinkle at the edges.”

By mid 2015 Jemsek started going through some major transitions, living briefly in Flagstaff, Arizona, out of his 1996 Ford Club Wagon van, until finally deciding to relocate to Seattle, Washington, where he would spend the next four years. Jemsek befriended songwriter and musician Bil Palmer at a local Seattle coffee shop where they both were working, and eventually reformed Dogbreth with Palmer playing lead guitar, contributing songs and co-fronting the band.

Together with Malia Seavey (drums), Greg Hughes (bass) and JJ (guitar/bass) they recorded ‘Ever Loving’ at the Unknown in Anacortes, Washington, which was released on 25 October 2019. Palmer wrote three songs for the new album, including lead single "When U Call My Name". The album had a warm critical reception. Martin Douglas at KEXP described the songs as “bountiful with warmth and emotional intelligence.”

Dogbreth's first album Chookie was made available on streaming services in late 2020 after a TikTok of a teenager excitedly listening to it for the first time gained over 270,000 likes on the platform, which brought a renewed interest to the release.

== Discography ==
=== Albums ===
- Chookie - Skulltula Records, CD, MP3 (2011)
- Sentimental Health - No Idea Records, LP, MP3 / Diet Pop Records, CD, MP3 / Lost Sound Tapes, Cassette, MP3 (2013)
- Second Home - Asian Man Records, LP, MP3 / Lauren Records, Cassette, MP3 (2016)
- Ever Loving - Asian Man Records, LP, MP3 (2019)

=== Extended plays ===
- Get Out - Anxiety Machine Records, 7", MP3 (2012)
- How Did You Do That / Morning Moon - Self release, MP3 (2021)
