= Doom Singer =

Studio album by Chris Farren
- Released: August 4, 2023
- Genre: Indie pop
- Length: 33:32
- Label: Polyvinyl
- Producer: Melina Duterte (Jay Som)

Chris Farren chronology
Death Don't Wait (Original Motion Picture Soundtrack) (2022)	Doom Singer (2023)

Professional ratings
Review scores
Source	Rating
Under the Radar	8/10 stars
Paste	8.1/10
The Line of Best Fit	7/10
New Noise Magazine	4/5 stars

Doom Singer is the fifth studio album from American indie pop musician Chris Farren.

== Track listing ==
All tracks are written by Chris Farren and Francesca Impastato

Doom Singer track listing
No.	Title	Length
1.	"Bluish"	3:11
2.	"All We Ever"	3:13
3.	"Get Over U"	2:58
4.	"Only U"	4:01
5.	"Doom Singer"	3:19
6.	"Screensaver"	2:44
7.	"First Place"	2:35
8.	"My Beauty"	2:20
9.	"Cosmic Leash"	4:41
10.	"Statue Song"	4:34
Total length:		33:41
