= Born Hot =

Studio album by Chris Farren
- Released: October 11, 2019
- Genre: Indie pop
- Length: 36:48
- Label: Polyvinyl
- Producer: Jenny Owens Young

Chris Farren chronology
Can't Die (2016)	Born Hot (2019)	Death Don't Wait (Original Motion Picture Soundtrack) (2022)

Born Hot is the third studio album from American indie pop musician Chris Farren, released on October 11, 2019.

== Track listing ==
All tracks are written by Chris Farren.

Born Hot track listing
No.	Title	Length
1.	"Bizzy"	2:39
2.	"Love Theme from "Born Hot""	2:38
3.	"Search 4 Me"	3:03
4.	"Too Dark"	3:41
5.	"Domain Lapse"	3:08
6.	"Does The Good Outweigh The Bad?"	3:10
7.	"I Was Amazing"	3:03
8.	"R U Still There?"	2:34
9.	"Surrender"	3:07
10.	"Space In Yr Love"	2:55
11.	"Floruit De Maga"	3:08
12.	"Credits"	3:37
Total length:		36:48
