= Jeff Rosenstock =

American punk rock musician (born 1982)

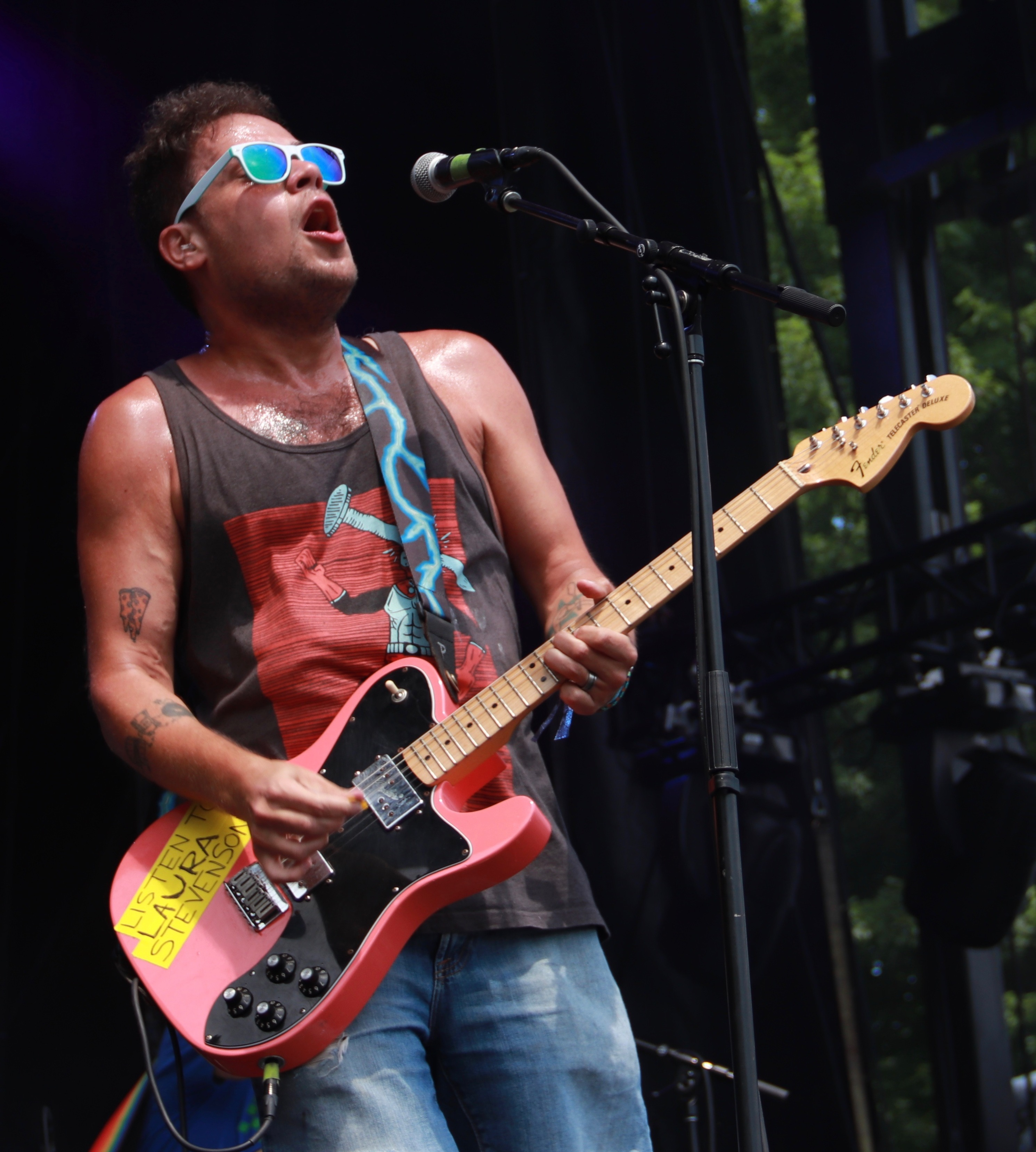
- Rosenstock performing at Pitchfork Music Festival in 2017

Background information
- Born: Jeffrey Ernest Rosenstock; September 7, 1982 (age 43)
- Origin: Long Island, New York, U.S.
- Genres: Punk rock; indie rock; pop punk; ska punk; power pop
- Instruments: Vocals; guitar; keyboard; saxophone
- Years active: 1995–present
- Labels: Quote Unquote; Really; Asbestos; SideOneDummy; Asian Man; Polyvinyl; Specialist Subject
- Member of: Death Rosenstock; Antarctigo Vespucci; The Bruce Lee Band
- Formerly of: The Arrogant Sons of Bitches; Bomb the Music Industry!; Kudrow; Pegasuses-XL
- Website: jeffrosenstock.com

Jeffrey Ernest Rosenstock (born September 7, 1982) is an American musician, multi-instrumentalist, singer and songwriter from Long Island, New York. He is known for his former bands Bomb the Music Industry! and The Arrogant Sons of Bitches, as well as for his work as a solo artist and as a composer for Craig of the Creek. He is the founder of Quote Unquote Records, the first donation-based record label.

== Early life ==
Jeffrey Ernest Rosenstock was raised in Baldwin on New York's Long Island. He was born to a Jewish mother who worked as an art teacher and a German Catholic father who worked as a lawyer. Rosenstock identifies as Jewish. His sister is TV writer and playwright Kim Rosenstock.

== Career ==
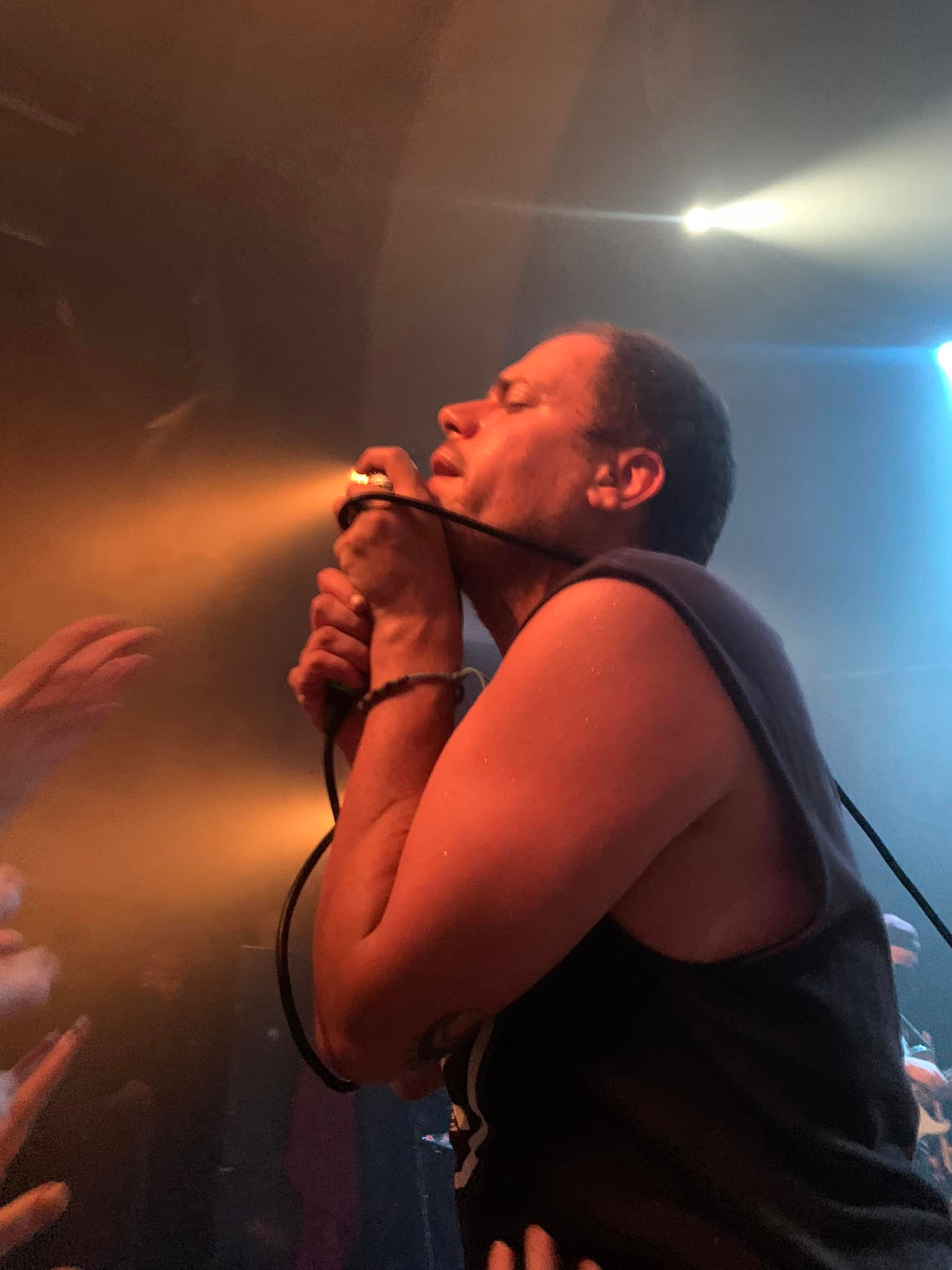
Rosenstock performing in Pittsburgh in 2021

Rosenstock formed his first band, The Arrogant Sons of Bitches (ASOB) in 1995, when he and his friend Joe Werfelman chose not to attend a friend's funeral due to feelings of discomfort, spending the day playing Green Day covers instead. In the midst of ASOB's breakup in 2004, Rosenstock recorded a solo song under the moniker Bomb the Music Industry, which evolved into his next musical project. Bomb the Music Industry became known for their DIY ethic and commitment to accessibility, earning a reputation as "the Fugazi for the internet age of punk." Following the release of Bomb the Music Industry's first full-length record, Album Minus Band, Rosenstock founded Quote Unquote Records, the first donation-based record label, distributing all the label's releases digitally through a pay what you want model.

Rosenstock began his solo career in 2012 by releasing his debut solo "mixtape" I Look Like Shit two months after Bomb the Music Industry! had announced their intention to break up. This was followed by the Summer Seven Club project in 2013, which granted purchasers of Rosenstock's 7-inch single "Summer" exclusive access to new songs periodically released over the following months. All the songs from Summer Seven Club were later collected and made available as the Summer + compilation album. Rosenstock's first studio album as a solo artist, We Cool?, was released in 2015. His second solo album, entitled Worry, was released on October 14, 2016. On New Year's Day 2018, Rosenstock released the ten-track Post-, his third studio album. His fourth studio album, No Dream, was released on May 20, 2020. A ska version of No Dream, titled Ska Dream was released on April 20, 2021. He released his fifth studio album, Hellmode, on August 31, 2023 worldwide - a day earlier than the scheduled September 1. Rosenstock has performed with many other ska and punk rock bands, including Mustard Plug, The Bruce Lee Band, and AJJ. He had also performed with his Bomb the Music Industry! band-mates Laura Stevenson and Lee Hartney. Some of Rosenstock's musical influences include Tom Waits, Pulp and The Beach Boys.

He has worked as a producer for other artists such as Mikey Erg, The Smith Street Band, Laura Stevenson, and Dan Andriano. He is also a member of Antarctigo Vespucci, a collaborative project between himself and Fake Problems frontman Chris Farren. Since 2014, he had also been a member of ska band Bruce Lee Band alongside Asian Man Records founder Mike Park.

Since 2018, Rosenstock has composed music for the Cartoon Network animated series Craig of the Creek. Rosenstock released a cover of the show's theme song on the 2019 live album Thanks, Sorry! performed by his solo band under the moniker Death Rosenstock. In 2020, the first full musical episode of the show was released, for which Rosenstock wrote all the music and lyrics; the soundtrack was released later that year. The soundtrack album for the Craig of the Creek animated film, Craig Before the Creek, released in 2024, with Rosenstock once again credited for writing all the music and lyrics.

In 2024, Jeff Rosenstock had a residency at the Warsaw in Brooklyn, where he played shows until they stopped selling out. He is currently scheduled to have a similar residency in Chicago at the Metro in July 2026.

== Personal life ==
Rosenstock married his longtime girlfriend, Christine Mackie, in 2015. The pair had been living in an apartment in Brooklyn, but in January 2020 they moved across the country to Highland Park, Los Angeles.

On November 8, 2024, Rosenstock came out publicly as non-binary on Bluesky, having previously privately identified as such for eight years. (Note: He stated his pronouns would stay as he/him in the same thread.)

== Discography ==
Solo

- I Look Like Shit (2012)
- We Cool? (2015)
- Worry (2016)
- Post- (2018)
- No Dream (2020)
- Ska Dream (2021)
- Hellmode (2023)

The Arrogant Sons of Bitches

- Built to Fail (1998)
- Pornocracy (2000)
- Three Cheers for Disappointment (2006)

Bomb the Music Industry!

- Album Minus Band (2005)
- To Leave or Die in Long Island (2005)
- Goodbye Cool World! (2006)
- Get Warmer (2007)
- Scrambles (2009)
- Adults!!!: Smart!!! Shithammered!!! And Excited by Nothing!!!!!!! (2010)
- Vacation (2011)

Pegasuses-XL

- The Midnight Aquarium (2006)
- XL (2006)
- Pegasuses-XL (2007)
- The Antiphon (2008)
- Electro Agitators (2009)
- Psychic Entourage (2011)

Kudrow

- Lando (2009)
- Boo (split with Hard Girls) (2011)

Antarctigo Vespucci

- Soulmate Stuff (2014)
- I'm So Tethered (2014)
- Leavin' La Vida Loca (2015)
- Love in the Time of E-Mail (2018)

The Bruce Lee Band

- Community Support Group (2014)
- Everything Will Be Alright, My Friend (2014)
- Rental!! Eviction!! (2019)
- One Step Forward. Two Steps Back. (2022)

Songwriting credits

- In the Key of the Creek: A Craig of the Creek Musical (2020)

Production credits

- The Smith Street Band: Throw Me in the River (2014)
- Dan Andriano in the Emergency Room: Party Adjacent (2015)
- Binary Heart: Brighter Days (2015)
- Laura Stevenson: Cocksure (2015)
- Mikey Erg: Tentative Decisions (2016)
- The Smith Street Band: More Scared of You Than You Are of Me (2017)
- Walter Etc.: Gloom Cruise (2017)
- Gladie: No Need To Be Lonely (2026)

Soundtrack albums

- Craig Before the Creek (2024)
