= Love in the Time of E-Mail =

Studio album by Antarctigo Vespucci
- Released: October 26, 2018
- Genre: pop-punk, power pop, indie rock
- Length: 36:13
- Label: Polyvinyl Record Co.

Antarctigo Vespucci chronology
Leavin' La Vida Loca (2015)	Love in the Time of E-Mail (2018)

Professional ratings
Review scores
Source	Rating
Drowned in Sound	8/10

Love in the Time of E-Mail is the second studio album by the American power pop band Antarctigo Vespucci. It was released on October 26, 2018, through Polyvinyl Record Co. and Quote Unquote Records in North America, and through Big Scary Monsters Recording Company in Europe.

== Background ==
Being previously un-signed to any label, Polyvinyl Records announced they had signed Antarctigo Vespucci in August 2018. At that time, the label also announced the band's (then unnamed) Live! In the Time of E-Mail tour with the band Katie Ellen.

Chris Farren and Jeff Rosenstock recorded the album in a small bedroom in Rosenstock's New York apartment. Like most Antarctigo Vespucci albums, the majority of the tracks began as demos by Farren.

== Promotion ==
Leading up to the release of Love in the Time of E-Mail, the band released a promotional video to the Polyvinyl Records YouTube channel titled, "Antarctigo Vespucci – So Accessible, No Wonder It’s #1," a parody of Internet advertisements from the 1990s. The video featured Farren listening to and describing the album as if it were an early Internet service provider (such as AOL, which much of the promotional merchandise for the album also parodies).

In September 2018, the song "White Noise" was released as the album's first single.

In October 2018, one week before the album was released, the band released a music video for the song "Freakin' U Out," and the song was released as the second single.

The Live! In the Time of E-Mail tour took place over November 2018. The concerts were primarily on the East Coast of the United States. In 2019, the band would open for AJJ on a tour of the West Coast of the United States

== Track listing ==
All tracks are written by Chris Farren and Jeff Rosenstock.

No.	Title	Length
1.	"Voicemail"	1:37
2.	"Kimmy"	2:20
3.	"White Noise"	2:14
4.	"Breathless on DVD"	2:43
5.	"The Price Is Right Theme Song"	2:12
6.	"So Vivid!"	4:40
7.	"Freakin' U Out"	2:48
8.	"All These Nights"	3:18
9.	"Not Yours"	2:25
10.	"Do It Over"	2:51
11.	"Another Good Thing"	3:00
12.	"Lifelike"	4:17
13.	"E-Mail"	1:37
Total length:		36:13
