= To Leave or Die in Long Island =

Studio album by Bomb the Music Industry!
- Released: October 15, 2005
- Genre: Ska punk
- Length: 24:53
- Labels: Quote Unquote Records, Asbestos Records
- Producer: Bomb the Music Industry!

Bomb the Music Industry! chronology
| Album Minus Band (2005) | To Leave or Die in Long Island (2005) | President's Day Split 7" (2006) |

To Leave or Die in Long Island is the second release by the DIY collective Bomb the Music Industry!. It is considered a "mini-album" by the band members, being too long to be an EP but not long enough to be a full-length.

The album was released by Asbestos Records on vinyl in December 2006, after a delay due to a manufacturing error. The first pressing consists of three versions on vinyl, and a limited edition picture disc.

== Track listing ==
All songs written by Jeff Rosenstock.

To Leave or Die in Long Island track listing
| No. | Title | Length |
|---|---|---|
| 1. | "Happy Anterrabae Day!!!" | 2:56 |
| 2. | "Congratulations, John, On Joining Every Time I Die" | 2:34 |
| 3. | "Showerbeers!" | 0:52 |
| 4. | "Stand There Until You’re Sober" | 4:16 |
| 5. | "Dude, Get With the Program" | 4:17 |
| 6. | "Bomb the Music Industry! (and Action Action) (and Refused) (and Born Against) Are Fucking Dead" | 2:45 |
| 7. | "Brian Wilson Says SMiLE! (a.k.a. My Beard of Defiance)" | 3:12 |
| 8. | "Syke! Life Is Awesome!" | 4:01 |
| Total length: | | 24:53 |

== Details ==
"Congratulations, John, On Joining Every Time I Die" is about BtMI! guitarist/bass player John DeDomenici, who singer/guitarist Jeff Rosenstock thought was going to quit BtMI! to join metalcore band Every Time I Die. He did not. The line "1, 2, 3, 1, 2, 3, Pick it up, 1, 2, 3" in the bridge is an homage to the Every Time I Die song "Off Broadway", but the actual lyric in the song is "keep it up", not pick it up.

The sample at the beginning of "Showerbeers" is from the movie Can't Hardly Wait.

"Bomb the Music Industry! (and Action Action) (and Refused) (and Born Against) Are Fucking Dead" contains a sample from the British sitcom The Office.

"Brian Wilson Says SMiLE! (a.k.a. Beard of Defiance)" uses a sample from The SpongeBob SquarePants Movie.
