= SKAppleton =

Annual ska concert in the Midwestern United States

SKAppleton is the largest annual ska concert in the Midwestern United States. It is held in early May each year in Appleton, Wisconsin, and features ska bands from around the region. The concert has included such bands as Mustard Plug, The Toasters, Umbrella Bed, 1,2,3 Walrus!, 4th and Michigan, The Invaders, Something To Do, Mediocre at Best, Quazimodo and the Hunch, Hired Geeks, Deal's Gone Bad, and Bomb The Music Industry.

The festival dates back to at least 1993.

SKAppleton 2011 took place on June 5 at Tanner's in Kimberly, Wisconsin, and featured Something To Do, Car Full of Midgets, Shortstop From Tokyo, Crazy 88, Superluck and more. Mustard Plug headlined the festival.

This also proved to be Car Full of Midgets last Skappleton, and their second to last show. They played their farewell show a few months later at Paperfest in Kimberly.

In 2012, due to financial issues, Skappleton was moved to Milwaukee after 19 years in Appleton and was sponsored by Horny Goat.

In 2023, Fox Valley Music Festivals brought Skappleton back to Appleton at Dr Jekyll's on May 12 and Appleton Beer Factory on May 13, featuring Mephiskapheles, Max and the invaders, The Crombies, Something To Do, Joystick, Space Monkey Mafia, Flying Raccoon Suit, Meskales, Courtesy of Tim, Local Legends, The Black and Blue Hearts, DJ Chuck Wren, JF Zastrow, The Chad O'Kennedy, Lefty Luci. Sponsored by Punk Rock Saves Lives, Heid Music, On the Upbeat, Relik Vintage and Oddity,
