= Teenage Retirement =

Studio album by Chumped
- Released: November 18, 2014
- Studio: Mollusk Studio in Ridgewood, Queens, NY
- Genre: Pop punk; emo; indie rock
- Length: 34:48
- Label: Anchorless Records
- Producer: John Meredith

Chumped chronology
That's the Thing Is Like... (2014)	Teenage Retirement (2014)

Teenage Retirement is the only studio album by American rock band Chumped, released on November 18, 2014, through Anchorless Records.

== Background ==
The album is titled after the band some members played in prior to Chumped's formation. The album's sound has been compared to that of Superchunk, Nirvana, and Slingshot Dakota. A music video for "December is the Longest Month" was released in December 2014.

Anika Pyle discussed the album's title in an interview prior to its release:

PYLE: It's like "Forever Young" for punks, essentially. It explores those darker things, like watching people get old, seasons getting away from you and people you love dying, but at the same time, it discusses holding onto what makes being young so fun and trying to retire in that. There are a lot of songs about aging and coping with getting older and grappling with the nostalgia of watching your youth run away from you. But there's also stuff about trying to hold onto what makes you feel young, because that's so important for enjoying your life.

== Critical reception ==
Professional ratings
Review scores
Source	Rating
Alternative Press	4/5 stars
Consequence of Sound	B
Exclaim!	7/10
Nashville Scene	(favorable)
Pitchfork Media	7.3/10
PopMatters	7/10
Punknews.org	4.5/5 stars
Robert Christgau	A–

Many critics gave Teenage Retirement favorable reviews, with Tom Breihan of Stereogum naming it "Album of the Week" on November 18. Josh Terry at Consequence of Sound considered the record "a strong opening statement of charming pop punk with airtight hooks and ripping guitar leads." Mischa Pearlman from Alternative Press described the album thus: "Chumped's debut album couldn’t really be called anything else—its 12 songs throb with both the naïve, reckless abandon of youth and the jaded, tired contemplation of old age." Pitchfork's Devon Maloney wrote that the album "finds that melodramatic sweet spot that made emo and pop punk hit so hard in the '90s and '00s." Zachary Houle of PopMatters felt it a "bonafide enjoyable album [...] Teenage Retirement feels constructed well as a whole." Kyle Ryan of Entertainment Weekly dubbed it "one of 2014's best musical surprises."

== Track listing ==
Teenage Retirement
No.	Title	Length
1.	"December Is the Longest Month"	4:01
2.	"Hot 97 Summer Jam"	2:19
3.	"Coffee"	2:23
4.	"Novella Ella Ella Eh"	1:21
5.	"Anywhere But Here"	2:54
6.	"Name That Thing"	2:13
7.	"Songs About Boats"	1:54
8.	"Long Division"	2:51
9.	"Something About Geography"	3:11
10.	"Penny"	2:50
11.	"The Pains of Being..."	4:40
12.	"Old and Tired"	4:11
Total length:		34:48
