= Saoirse dream =

American musician

saoirse dream
- Egbert in 2024

Background information
- Also known as: Catherine Egbert; DJSUSIEDELTARUNE
- Born: 2000 or 2001 (age 25–26)
- Genres: hyperpop; emo; wizard sleaze; indie rock
- Occupations: Singer-songwriter; producer
- Years active: 2021–present
- Label: Lauren Records
- Member of: webcage
- Website: saoirsedream.bandcamp.com/music

Catherine Egbert (born 2000 or 2001), primarily known by her stage name saoirse dream (stylized all-lowercase), is an American musician based in Portland, Oregon.

== Early life ==
Egbert grew up in Northern California. Her mother was a kindergarten teacher. She began creating dance music when she was 12, as well as being the bassist in a punk band. As a teen, she released dance music in various forms under several different names.

== Career ==
saoirse dream - shasta
This song from let the sky in features rudimentary, chiptune-like synths weaved into uptempo rock music. Such a style would be continually used throughout Egbert's discography.

Egbert released her first album as saoirse dream, let the sky in, in 2021. Some of the songs had been written as early as 2018. Egbert has stated that she sees let the sky in as "album number zero", and considers everything*, released in September 2021, as her actual debut. Her first live show as saoirse dream was at Mano Oculta in August 2022. In November 2022, saoirse dream released star★☆, which became a cult hit.

Her self-titled album saoirse dream was released in February 2025. Her creation of the album was bolstered by the Target store she worked at closing due to COVID-19, which obligated it to pay her for three months she did not work, allowing her to devote the time to the album. The album was released via Lauren Records. It blended emo and indie rock, and Egbert described its genre as "wizard sleaze". Reviewers described it as "confessional" and "vulnerable."

The short film How to Find a Career That Loves You Back included saoirse dream's song "onlooker."

Her next album, grimdark, was released via Lauren Records on October 9, 2026. It drew from Egbert's emo and punk roots, as well as her experiences and anger as a trans woman. Reviewers described it as having a mix of "gritty" and "sparkling" lyrics and a combination of brighter and darker tones. Reviewers also praised the themes of the album and its focus on resilience through desperation. The title came from the concepts of grimdarkness and antiheros.

When performing live, Egbert is joined by siblings Roy and Cleo McKenzie on bass and drums, respectively. Egbert herself sings and plays guitar. The combined ensemble is still called saoirse dream.

Egbert has also DJed under the name "DJSUSIEDELTARUNE," a reference to the character from the video game Deltarune.

Saoirse dream is a member of the musical collective webcage and was a member of the group producer project TwerkNation28.

== Personal life ==
After dropping out of college, Egbert moved from Santa Cruz, California to Portland, Oregon in March 2020, shortly before the COVID-19 pandemic. She worked at a local Subway and Target.

Egbert is a trans woman. She has stated that she strongly dislikes when people insinuate this is related to her musical skill.

== Discography ==
- let the sky in (2021), self-released
- everything* (2021), self-released
- collection ii (2022), self-released
- star★☆ (2022), Lauren Records
- power (2024), self-released
- saoirse dream (2025), Lauren Records
- grimdark (2026), Lauren Records
