= Blowout (band) =

Pop punk band from Portland, Oregon

- Origin: Portland, Oregon
- Genres: Pop punk
- Years active: 2014–2017
- Labels: Lauren Records
- Past members: Laken Wright; Travis King; Brennan Facchino; Nick Everett

Blowout was a pop punk band from Portland, Oregon, active from 2014 to 2017. The band's members were frontwoman Laken Wright (bass/vocals), Travis King (guitar), Brennan Facchino (guitar), and Nick Everett (drums). They released their only studio album, No Beer, No Dad, on Lauren Records in August 2016.
