= Real Ghosts Caught on Tape =

Real Ghosts Caught On Tape

Studio album by Fake Problems
- Released: September 21, 2010
- Recorded: 2010
- Genre: Indie rock, punk rock
- Label: Side One Dummy
- Producer: Ted Hutt

Fake Problems chronology
It's Great to Be Alive (2009)	Real Ghosts Caught On Tape (2010)

Real Ghosts Caught On Tape is the third full-length album from the rock band Fake Problems. It was released on September 21, 2010 and is their second release for Side One Dummy since joining the label in November 2008. The song Soulless was used in an Android Application commercial.

== Track listing ==
1. "ADT" (Agoraphobic Dance Tune)
2. "5678"
3. "Songs for Teenagers"
4. "RSVP"
5. "Soulless"
6. "Complaint Dept."
7. "Done with Fun"
8. "The Magazines"
9. "White Lies"
10. "Grand Finale"
11. "Ghost to Coast"
12. "The Gun" (iTunes Bonus Track)

== Personnel ==
- Chris Farren – vocals and guitar
- Derek Perry – bass
- Sean Stevenson – drums
- Casey Lee – guitar
- Mae Whitman – guest vocals
- Alia Shawkat – guest vocals
- Harry Trumfio – steel drums
