= Leavin' La Vida Loca =

Studio album by Antarctigo Vespucci
- Released: July 24, 2015
- Genre: Pop-punk
- Length: 25:30
- Label: Quote Unquote Records

Antarctigo Vespucci chronology
I'm So Tethered (2014)	Leavin' La Vida Loca (2015)	Love in the Time of E-Mail (2018)

Leavin' La Vida Loca is the debut studio album by American band Antarctigo Vespucci. It was released on July 24, 2015 through Quote Unquote Records. The album's title is a parody of the song Livin' La Vida Loca.

== Track listing ==
All tracks are written by Chris Farren and Jeff Rosenstock.

No.	Title	Length
1.	"2 Days"	1:56
2.	"Impossible to Place"	2:30
3.	"Save Me From Myself"	2:18
4.	"Losing My Mind"	2:48
5.	"Hooray For Me"	2:29
6.	"VI"	1:04
7.	"Living In Hell"	3:04
8.	"No Bad Memories"	2:15
9.	"Crashing Waves"	3:11
10.	"I See Failure"	3:55
Total length:		25:13
