= Bomb the Music Industry! =

American ska punk musical collective

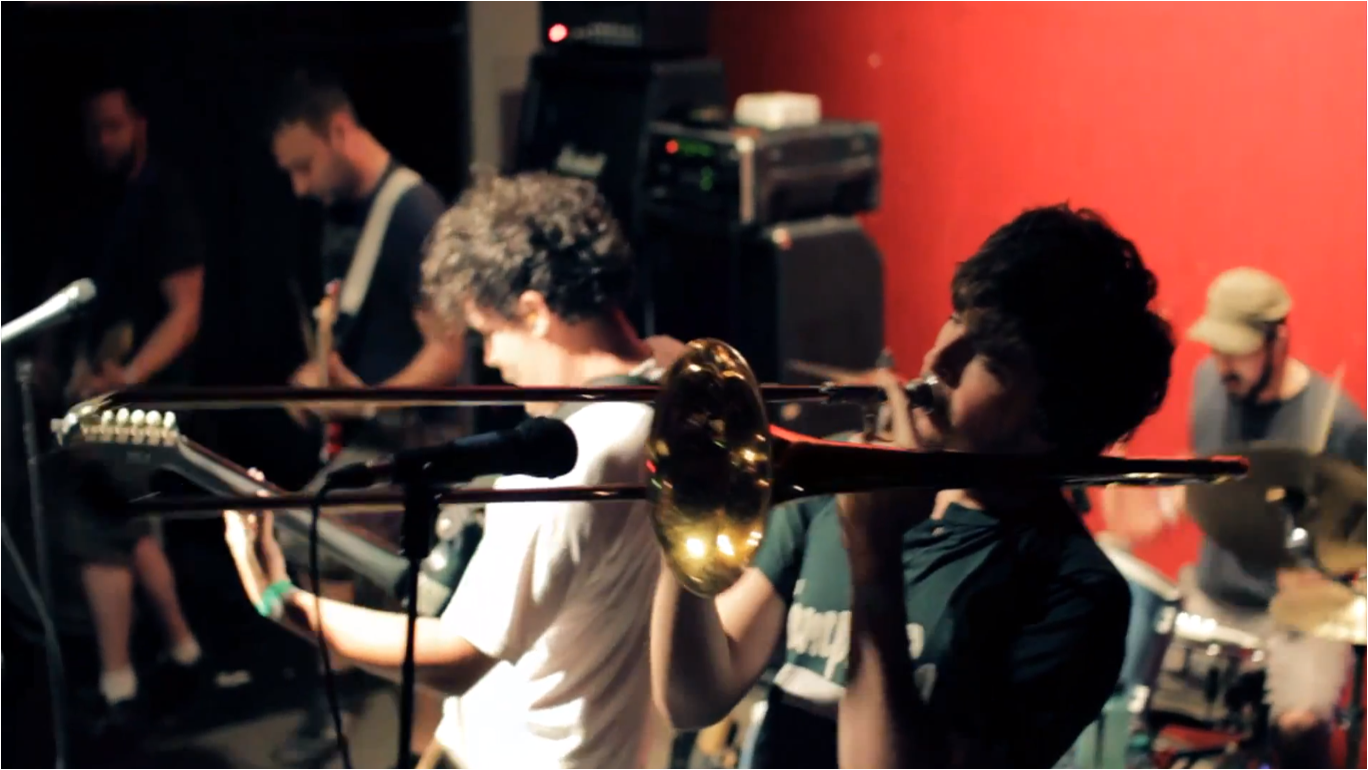
- Bomb the Music Industry! performs in Tampa, Florida, on March 26, 2012.

Background information
- Origin: Baldwin, New York, U.S.
- Genres: Punk rock; ska punk; indie rock; folk punk
- Years active: 2004–2014
- Labels: Quote Unquote; Asian Man; Polyvinyl; Ernest Jenning; Really; Asbestos
- Past members: Jeff Rosenstock; John DeDominici; Mike Costa; Tom Malinowski; Matt Keegan; See also Band members

Bomb the Music Industry! (commonly abbreviated as Bomb or BtMI!) was an American punk rock musical collective from Baldwin, Nassau County, New York, United States, led by singer-songwriter, producer, and multi-instrumentalist Jeff Rosenstock.

The band was known for their DIY punk ethic and commitment to accessibility. In addition to distributing their music via a pay what you want model, they primarily played affordable all-ages shows and established an accessible and collaborative environment for fans. Due to these factors, the collective has been referred to as "the Fugazi for the internet age of punk."

While the group's structure remained loose throughout its history, with their roster varying significantly between performances, a core five-piece lineup gradually coalesced around Jeff Rosenstock, John DeDominici, Mike Costa, Tom Malinowski, and Matt Keegan, although they continued to be frequently joined by other collaborators. In 2012, the band announced an indefinite hiatus, playing their final show in Brooklyn in 2014.

The staff of Consequence ranked the band at number 22 on their list of "The 100 Best Pop Punk Bands" in 2019.

== History ==
In the midst of the breakup of Jeff Rosenstock's prior band, The Arrogant Sons of Bitches, Rosenstock recorded an anti-Bush protest song titled "Sweet Home Cananada" using his PowerBook's built-in microphone. He released the song online under the moniker Bomb the Music Industry!, with the use of the word "bomb" deriving from a graffiti term, which was meant by Rosenstock to signify a synthesis between creation and destruction. "I wrote that song and put it out to see if anybody wanted it. That was how it started, people showed interest and I like recording stuff." Rosenstock has cited his frustration with the typical practices of the independent music business as the impetus for trying a different, flexible approach, stating that the "merchandising aspect of things … was getting in the way of writing songs."

Due to the response to this first track, Rosenstock launched the first online donation-based record label, Quote Unquote Records in 2006; the label's inaugural release was the first full-length Bomb the Music Industry full-length record, Album Minus Band. Eschewing traditional music merchandising, the band encouraged fans to bring blank T-shirts to shows, which the band would spray paint for using custom stencils, as well as blank CDs, onto which the band would burn copies of their album; Rosenstock and his collaborators provided these services for free, accepting donations when offered. While the band would eventually decide to engage in traditional merchandise sales as well, the free options remained available, maintaining their reputation for DIY ethics.

The first three Bomb the Music Industry! records were almost entirely written, performed, and produced by Rosenstock himself, with early shows featuring Rosenstock either performing solo alongside backing tracks on his iPod, or accompanied by a lineup of sporadic guests varying significantly in lineup size. Several tours featured Rosenstock performing as a duo, either with Mustard Plug bassist Rick Johnson, or collaborator Matt Kurz. The Rosenstock/Johnson iteration toured the United Kingdom as part of the Ska is Dead tour.

In 2007, following their performance at SKAppleton, Bomb the Music Industry! embarked on the Real Bands Tour?, featuring a full-band lineup, an approach which was reflected in the production of their 2007 record Get Warmer, and followed for subsequent records. While they continued releasing their records digitally for free via Quote Unquote Records, from Get Warmer onward they partnered with Asian Man Records for physical releases. Their first official music video, for the song "Wednesday Night Drinkball" from their 2009 record Scrambles, was directed by Bryan Schlam and premiered after the album's release.

Following the release of the album Vacation in 2012, an instrumental version of the track "Can’t Complain" was featured in an episode of The Office. They also recorded a cover of "Little Boxes" which was featured in a season eight opening sequence of Weeds. Later that year, the band announced an indefinite hiatus, stating that their summer US tour would likely be their last, stating that "the 9 – 10 months of our lives when we are not playing music are not fantastic. ... it seems like it’s just time to see if there’s anything out there that can provide us with full-time joy instead of part-time joy." Following an international farewell tour in 2013, the band played their final show in Brooklyn on January 19, 2014. A documentary about the band titled Never Get Tired produced by filmmaker Sara Crow, which had been funded via Kickstarter and had begun filming in 2010 prior to the band's breakup, was released in 2015, commemorating the band's history and legacy.

Jeff Rosenstock has since pursued a career as a solo artist, releasing his full-length first solo album, We Cool? in 2015. John DeDomenici continues to perform in Rosenstock's backing band, "Death Rosenstock," which also features Matt Keegan's Shinobu bandmate Mike Huguenor. Rosenstock is also the music composer for the animated children's show Craig of the Creek.

== Style ==
While Bomb the Music Industry!'s musical style was originally rooted in ska punk, they incorporated elements from a variety of genres, including synthpop, power pop, folk music, chiptune, indie rock, hardcore, and electronic music. The group's diverse influences and interests have been reflected in the variety of covers they recorded over the years, by artists such as We Versus the Shark, Harvey Danger, Pavement, Anti-Flag, Slow Gherkin, and others.

Rosenstock's lyrics explore both personal and political themes, often incorporating self-deprecating humor. Common song topics include mental health, employment issues, personal relationships, and criticisms of the music industry (including the independent scene). The band made use of a variety of arrangements and instrumentation, including straightforward rock structures, stripped down acoustic guitar-and-vocals recordings, and combinations thereof with brass, strings, electronic elements, and others. The band occasionally incorporated complex time signatures on tracks such as "9/11 Fever". When an interviewer once described the band as "ska for smart people," Jeff Rosenstock responded: "...you could call us ska music for smart people or indie rock for dumbasses at the same time. That's nice that somebody thinks we're smart."

== Discography ==
=== Full-length albums ===
- Album Minus Band (2005) – Quote Unquote Records (Digital) / Asbestos Records (Vinyl) / Asian Man Records (Vinyl)
- To Leave or Die in Long Island (2005) – Quote Unquote Records (Digital) / Asbestos Records (Vinyl)/ Asian Man Records (Vinyl)
- Goodbye Cool World! (2006) – Quote Unquote Records (Digital) / Asbestos Records (Vinyl) / Asian Man Records (Vinyl)
- Get Warmer (2007) – Quote Unquote Records (Digital) / Asian Man Records (CD/Vinyl)
- Scrambles (2009) – Quote Unquote Records (Digital) / Asian Man Records (CD/Vinyl)
- Adults!!!: Smart!!! Shithammered!!! And Excited by Nothing!!!!!!! (2010) – Quote Unquote Records (Digital) / Really Records (Vinyl)
- Vacation (2011) – Quote Unquote Records (Digital) / Ernest Jenning Record Co. / Really Records (CD/Vinyl)

=== EPs and splits ===
- Presidents Day Split 7″ (2006) – Asbestos Records (Vinyl)
- Bomb the Music Industry! / O Pioneers!!! Split 10" (2007) – Quote Unquote Records (Digital) / Team Science (CD) / Asbestos Records (Vinyl)
- Under the Influence Vo. 3 Split 7" w/ Mustard Plug (2009) – Suburban Home Records (Vinyl Only)
- Others! Others! Volume 1 (2009) – Quote Unquote Records (Digital)
- Bomb the Music Industry! / Laura Stevenson Split 7" (2009) – Quote Unquote Records (Digital) / Kiss of Death Records (Vinyl)
- Everybody That You Love 7" (2010) – Quote Unquote Records (Digital) / Paper + Plastick (Vinyl)
- Ska is Dead, Vol. 6 Split 7" w/ The Slackers (2011) – Asbestos Records (Vinyl)

=== Compilations ===
- V/A – More Bang for Your Buck III – Asbestos Records (2006) feat. "Congratulations John on Joining Every Time I Die"
- V/A – Shine Some Light: A Benefit for Dan Lang-Gunn – Asbestos Records (2006) feat. "If Assholes got Awards, I'd Have a Trophy Case"
- V/A – Ska is Dead – Asian Man Records (2007) feat. "I'm Terrorfied!"
- V/A – More Bang for Your Buck IV – Asbestos Records (2007) feat. "My Response To An Article In Alternative Press"
- V/A – Everyone Living Under A Gun – The Political Party (2008) feat. "No Rest for the Whiny"
- V/A – Head Above Water- A Response to the BP Drilling Disaster (2011) feat. "Sleep through Monday"
- V/A – Tallahassee Turns Ten – A Mountains Goats tribute album (2013) feat. "Ethiopians"

=== Music videos ===
- "Wednesday Night Drinkball" from Scrambles (2009)
- "Everybody That You Love" from Everybody That You Love (2010)

== Band members ==
As a collective, the membership of Bomb the Music Industry varied significantly between performances, with some individuals even performing just once due to the band's policy of allowing fans to join them on stage. Over time, a core five-piece lineup solidified for both recordings and live performances, albeit with frequent outside contributions. Due to the impossibility of documenting all live contributors to the collective, this article only lists individuals who contributed to the group's recordings.

=== Final core members ===
- Jeff Rosenstock – vocals, guitars, keyboards, saxophone, songwriting, percussion, programming, production
- John Dedomenici – bass, drums, vocals
- Mike Costa – drums
- Tom Malinowski – guitar, vocals
- Matt Keegan – keyboards, trombone, guitar, vocals

=== Studio contributors ===
- Laura Stevenson – vocals, keyboards, banjo, songwriting
- Sean Qualls – songwriting, Drums
- Luke Fields – baritone guitar, banjo
- Joel Hastat – percussion, backup vocals, Sleigh Bells
- Matt Kurz – backup vocals, lead guitar
- Rick Johnson – bass, Theremin
- Sean McCabe – trombone, mandolin, tannerin
- Lolo Myers – backup vocals
- Andy Pruett – trumpet
- Brady Smith – drums, Percussion
- Scott Smith – percussion
- Jace Bartet – bass, backup vocals
- Al Daglis – backup vocals, saxophone
- Jeff Tobias – backup vocals
- Ben Duncan – backup vocals
- Christine Mackie – backup vocals, bells
- Neil Callaghan – Farfisa organ, melodica
- Cara Beth Satalito – vocals
- Chuck Bradburn – string bass
- Jason Calhoun – violin
- Lolo Myers – cello
- Jeff Johnson – drums
- Eric Solomon – backing vocals
- Mike Campbell – Omnichord
- Dino – vocals
- Kepi Ghoulie – vocals
- Sean Bonnette – vocals
- Chris Candy – trumpet
- Ginger Alford – vocals
- Steve Ciolek – vocals
- Katie Cleary – bass
- Steven D'Agostino – banjo
- Chris Farren – vocals
- Ben Gallatty – upright bass
- Chris Guglielmo – drums
- Mike Huguenor – vocals
- Aidan Koehler – violins
- Casey lee – pedal steel
- Lindsay McMullen – cello
- Dave Renz – vocals
- Matt Scheuermann – vocals
- Skylar Suorez – vibraphone
- Witt Wisebram – harmonica
