= It's Great to Be Alive (album) =

Studio album by Fake Problems
- Released: February 17, 2009
- Recorded: 2008
- Genre: Punk rock, folk punk
- Length: 36:56
- Label: Side One Dummy

Fake Problems chronology
| How Far Our Bodies Go (2007) | It's Great to Be Alive (2009) | Real Ghosts Caught on Tape (2010) |

Professional ratings
Review scores
| Source | Rating |
|---|---|
| Absolutepunk.net | (88%) |
| PopMatters | 8/10 stars |
| Punknews.org | 4/5 stars |

It's Great to Be Alive is the second full-length album from indie-punk band Fake Problems. It was released February 17, 2009 and is their first for Side One Dummy since joining the label in November 2008.

A video for the song "Dream Team" was filmed in January 2009; it was the band's first video. The band invited fans and friends to the video shoot to appear in the video.

== Track listing ==
| No. | Title | Length |
|---|---|---|
| 1. | "1234" | 1:22 |
| 2. | "Dream Team" | 2:11 |
| 3. | "You're a Serpent, You're a She-Snake" | 3:09 |
| 4. | "Don't Worry Baby" | 3:15 |
| 5. | "The Heaven & Hell Cotillion" | 1:21 |
| 6. | "Level With the Devil" | 5:06 |
| 7. | "Diamond Rings" | 3:50 |
| 8. | "Tabernacle Song" | 3:13 |
| 9. | "Alligator Assassinator" | 1:55 |
| 10. | "There Are Times" | 3:27 |
| 11. | "Too Cold to Hold" | 3:25 |
| 12. | "Heart BPM" | 4:33 |

== Personnel ==
- Chris Farren – vocals and guitar
- Derek Perry – bass
- Sean Stevenson – drums
- Casey Lee – guitar
