= Shinobu (band) =

American indie rock band

- Origin: San Jose, California, US
- Genres: Indie rock; Midwest emo; art rock; noise pop; punk rock; indie pop; pop punk; lo-fi; experimental rock
- Years active: 2002–present
- Labels: Quote Unquote; Asian Man; Lauren; Really; Phat 'N' Phunky
- Members: Mike Huguenor; Matt Keegan; Bob Vielma; Jon Fu
- Past members: Vince Tran

Shinobu is an American indie rock band formed in 2002 in San Jose, California. The group consists of Mike Huguenor (vocals, guitar), Matt Keegan (trombone, guitar, vocals, keyboards), Bob Vielma (bass, vocals), and Jon Fu (drums).

They released their debut EP Exhaustion Exhaustion in 2003 and their debut album Herostratus vs. Time in October 2004. In 2006 they released Worstward Ho!, their second album, through Asian Man Records; their first release with distribution. Their latest release, 10 Thermidor, was released through Quote Unquote Records digitally for free and physically on Lauren Records and Really Records.

They are currently signed to Quote Unquote Records, Asian Man Records, and Phat 'N' Phunky.

They have played with acts such as Xiu Xiu, the Exquisites, Bomb the Music Industry!, Ted Leo and the Pharmacists, Emperor X, Ging Nang Boyz, and AJJ.

Heavily influenced by bands like the Weakerthans, Pixies, Neutral Milk Hotel, and Pavement, they are known for their thoughtful, clever, existentialist, usually self-deprecating lyrics, their off kilter drumming and sharp angular fractured noisy guitar riffs and their odd use of lo-fi production techniques.

According to Vice, they are arguably one of the most subtly influential bands on the current DIY indie punk scene.

Joyce Manor and Touché Amoré are among the bands that credit Shinobu as one of their biggest influences.

The term "Shinobu" is mostly likely a reference to the anime and manga series Urusei Yatsura.

== Discography ==
Title	Details
Exhaustion Exhaustion	Released: 2003; Label: Independent; Formats: CD
Herostratus vs. Time	Released: 2004; Label: Let's Go! Records; Formats: CD
Worstward, Ho!	Released: 2006; Label: Asian Man Records; Formats: CD, Vinyl
Shinobu / Pteradon	Released: 2007; Label: Asian Man Records; Formats: Vinyl
Strange Spring Air	Released: 2009; Label: Quote Unquote Records, Lauren Records, Phat 'N' Phunky; Formats: Digital, Vinyl
Exhaustive, Exhaustive	Released: 2010; Label: Quote Unquote Records; Formats: Digital
Tangram Sailors / Ashtray Sea	Released: 2010; Label: Phat 'N' Phunky; Formats: Vinyl
Scared of the Youth, Scared of What's Next	Released: 2011; Label: Phat 'N' Phunky; Formats: Vinyl
Four Tomorrow / Shinobu	Released: 2013; Label: Phat 'N' Phunky; Formats: Vinyl
10 Thermidor	Released: 2015; Label: Lauren Records, Quote Unquote Records, Asian Man Records, Really Records, Phat 'N' Phunky; Formats: Digital, Vinyl, CD, Cassette
Live on KFJC 89.7	Released: 2017; Label: Phat 'N' Phunky; Formats: Digital
