= We Versus the Shark =

American math rock band

- Origin: Athens, Georgia, U.S.
- Genres: Math rock. experimental rock, post-punk, dance-punk, punk rock, indie rock, art punk, art pop
- Years active: 2003–2009, 2020–present
- Labels: Hello Sir, Quote Unquote Records
- Website: wevstheshark.com

We Versus the Shark is an American math rock band from Athens, Georgia, United States. The band formed in March 2003, and is composed of several multi-instrumentalists who change instruments and all sing during live shows. Their debut full-length, Ruin Everything!, was released in January 2005 on the label Hello Sir. An EP followed in 2007. The band released the album "Dirty Versions" on November 17, 2008. The band also released an album of cover songs on Quote Unquote Records featuring songs by bands as diverse as Tom Waits, Tears for Fears, The Matt Kurz One, and Television. On March 23, 2020, the band announced its return and released a new single, Righteous Vibes, the next day.

== Members ==
- Luke Douglas Fields – guitar, keyboards, vocals
- Jeffrey Daniel Tobias – bass, keyboards, vocals
- Scott Philip Smith – drums
- Samantha Erin Paulsen – guitar, keyboards, vocals

== Discography ==
- Split EP with Cinemechanica and Maserati (Hello Sir, 2004)
- Ruin Everything! (Hello Sir, 2005)
- EP of Bees EP (Hello Sir, 2007)
- Dirty Versions (Hello Sir, 2008)
- Murmurmur (Quote Unquote Records, 2008)
- Goodbye Guitar (Ernest Jenning Record Co., 2020)
