= The Arrogant Sons of Bitches =

American ska punk band

- Origin: Long Island, New York, United States
- Genres: Ska punk, Skate punk
- Years active: 1995–2004, 2006, 2007, 2012
- Labels: Independent, Kill Normal Records, Very Distribution, Quote Unquote Records, Breaking The Law Records
- Past members: Mike Costa (Drums); Chris Baltrus (Bass); Dave Renz (Trombone, Backup Vocals, Bells); John DeDominici (Bass); Jeff Rosenstock (Lead Vocals, Guitar, Saxophone); JT Turret (Keyboard, Vocals, Acrobatics); Sean Qualls (Guitar, Math); Joe Bove (Bass); Sean McCabe (Trombone)

The Arrogant Sons of Bitches (commonly abbreviated as ASOB) was a 6-piece ska punk band from Long Island and Baldwin, New York. The band was known for its strong DIY punk roots, self-releasing two albums and two EPs. Their final album, Three Cheers For Disappointment, was released on Kill Normal Records.

Frontman Jeff Rosenstock went on to found Quote Unquote Records, a donation-based record label, as well as the band Bomb the Music Industry! Other members went on to join Jay Tea, Hello Nurse, Let Me Crazy, and The Rocky Sullivans.

== History ==
In 1995, Joe Werfelman and Jeff Rosenstock started playing Green Day cover songs together. More members gradually joined their band, and in 1998 they recorded their first album, Released on Breaking the Law Records and titled Built to Fail. Following Built to Fail, the band experienced some success and played with bands such as Edna's Goldfish, Catch 22, and The Toasters. In 2000 they released their second album, Pornocracy.

At this point, many ASOB members quit the band to attend college. In 2003 the band decided to follow the Warped Tour, playing outside of the venues. After a while they were invited into the tour.

In 2004 the band completed recording most of the album Three Cheers For Disappointment. At this point the band was starting to break up, and Jeff started a new band, Bomb the Music Industry! The album was finally released in 2006, and the band broke up officially.

However, in 2007 ASOB announced a farewell show for their fans at The Knitting Factory. The show sold out in under seven hours, an unprecedented phenomenon for the show's venue. A second farewell show was played the following night at the Crazy Donkey in Farmingdale, New York.

Five years later, the band reunited for a set of shows in New York. Jeff explained: "We like each other again, and thought it would be fun to play together again. This show is a one time thing. There are absolutely no plans to make another record, to go on a big tour anywhere or anything like that."

Throughout their career, ASOB was praised for their high-energy live performances. One reviewer described that "They're climbing on the ceiling, the keyboardist would be jumping up and down on the keyboard swinging from hanging speakers, and the bassist would stage dive in an empty spot... land straight on his face, and keep rocking out as he had the time of his life."

== Band members ==
Lineups
(1995)	Jeff Rosenstock – lead vocals, guitar; Joe Werfelman – guitar
(1996) 1996 Demo	Jeff Rosenstock – lead vocals, guitar; Joe Werfelman – guitar; Chris Valentino – saxophone; Patric Santiago – drums
(1997)	Jeff Rosenstock – lead vocals, guitar; Joe Werfelman – guitar; Chris Baltrus – bass guitar; Chris Valentino – saxophone; Patric Santiago – drums
(1997)	Jeff Rosenstock – lead vocals, guitar; Joe Werfelman – guitar; Chris Baltrus – bass guitar; Chris Valentino – saxophone; Joe Vazquez – drums
(1998) Integrity Tape	Jeff Rosenstock – lead vocals, guitar; Joe Werfelman – guitar; Chris Baltrus – bass guitar; Chris Valentino – saxophone; Bryan Cohen – drums
(1998) Built To Fail	Jeff Rosenstock – lead vocals, guitar; Joe Werfelman – guitar; Chris Baltrus – bass guitar; Dave Dickerman – trombone; Chris Valentino – saxophone; Steve Connolly – trumpet; John DeDomenici – drums
(1999)	Jeff Rosenstock – lead vocals, guitar; Joe Werfelman – guitar; John DeDomenici – guitar; Chris Baltrus – bass guitar; Dave Dickerman – trombone; Chris Valentino – saxophone; Eric Bucello – trumpet; Steve Connolly – trumpet; Mike Costa – drums
(2000) Pornocracy	Jeff Rosenstock – lead vocals, guitar; Joe Werfelman – guitar; John DeDomenici – guitar; Chris Baltrus – bass guitar; Dave Dickerman – trombone; Chris Valentino – saxophone; Eric Bucello – trumpet; Steve Connolly – trumpet; JT Turret – keyboard; Mike Costa – drums
(2000) Pornocracy	Jeff Rosenstock – lead vocals, guitar; Joe Werfelman – guitar; John DeDomeici – guitar; Chris Baltrus – bass guitar; Joe Bove – bass guitar; Dave Dickerman – trombone; Chris Valentino – saxophone; Eric Bucello – trumpet; Steve Connolly – trumpet; JT Turret – keyboard; Mike Costa – drums
(2001–2002) All The Little Ones Are Rotting	Jeff Rosenstock – lead vocals, guitar; Joe Werfelman – guitar; Chris Baltrus – bass guitar; Dave Dickerman – trombone; Sean McCabe – trombone; Mike Costa – drums; JT Turret – guest vocals (on album), keyboard (live)
(2003)	Jeff Rosenstock – lead vocals, guitar; Joe Werfelman – guitar; Joe Bove – bass guitar; Dave Dickerman – trombone; Sean McCabe – trombone; JT Turret – keyboard; Mike Costa – drums
(2003) This is What You Get	Jeff Rosenstock – lead vocals, guitar; Sean Qualls – guitar; Joe Bove – bass guitar; Dave Dickerman – trombone; Sean McCabe – trombone; JT Turret – keyboard; Mike Costa – drums
(2003–2004)	Jeff Rosenstock – lead vocals, guitar; Sean Qualls – bass guitar; Dave Dickerman – trombone; Sean McCabe – trombone; JT Turret – keyboard; Mike Costa – drums
(2004)	Jeff Rosenstock – lead vocals, guitar; Sean Qualls – guitar; James Lynch – bass guitar; Dave Dickerman – trombone; Sean McCabe – trombone; JT Turret – keyboard; Mike Costa – drums
(2005–2007) Three Cheers for Disappointment	Jeff Rosenstock – lead vocals, guitar; Sean Qualls – guitar; Joe Bove – bass guitar (on album); John DeDomenici – bass guitar (live only); Dave Dickerman – trombone; Sean McCabe – trombone; Chris Valentino – saxophone (live only); JT Turret – keyboard; Mike Costa – drums
(2007) Farewell Show	Jeff Rosenstock – lead vocals, guitar; Joe Werfelman – guitar; Sean Qualls – guitar; John DeDomenici – bass guitar, guitar; Chris Baltrus – bass guitar; Joe Bove – bass guitar; James Lynch – bass guitar; Dave Dickerman – trombone; Sean McCabe – trombone; Chris Valentino – saxophone; JT Turret – keyboard; Mike Costa – drums; Chris Candy – trumpet
(2012) Reunion	Jeff Rosenstock – lead vocals, guitar; Sean Qualls – guitar; Joe Bove – bass guitar; Dave Dickerman – trombone; Sean McCabe - trombone; JT Turret – keyboard; Mike Costa – drums

Timeline

== Discography ==
Year	Title	Details
1998	Built to Fail	Breaking The Law Records
2000	Pornocracy	Self-released album
2001	The Apology EP	Self-released EP
2002	All the Little Ones Are Rotting	Self-released EP
2003	All the Little Ones Are Rotting (Super-Deluxe Edition)	Enhanced EP re-released on Killnormal Records
2004	The Arrogant Sons of Bitches	Complete discography re-released on Killnormal Records / Very Distribution
2006	Three Cheers for Disappointment	Quote Unquote Records (Digital) / Killnormal Records (CD) / Asbestos Records (Vinyl)
2006	This Is What You Get	Quote Unquote Records (Digital) live album of Radiohead cover songs from a Halloween show
2009	All the Little Ones Are Rotting (Digital Re-Issue)	EP with 6 bonus tracks and documentary re-released on Quote Unquote Records (Digital)

=== Music videos ===
- So Let's Go! NOWHERE (2006)
