= Lauren Records =

American independent record label

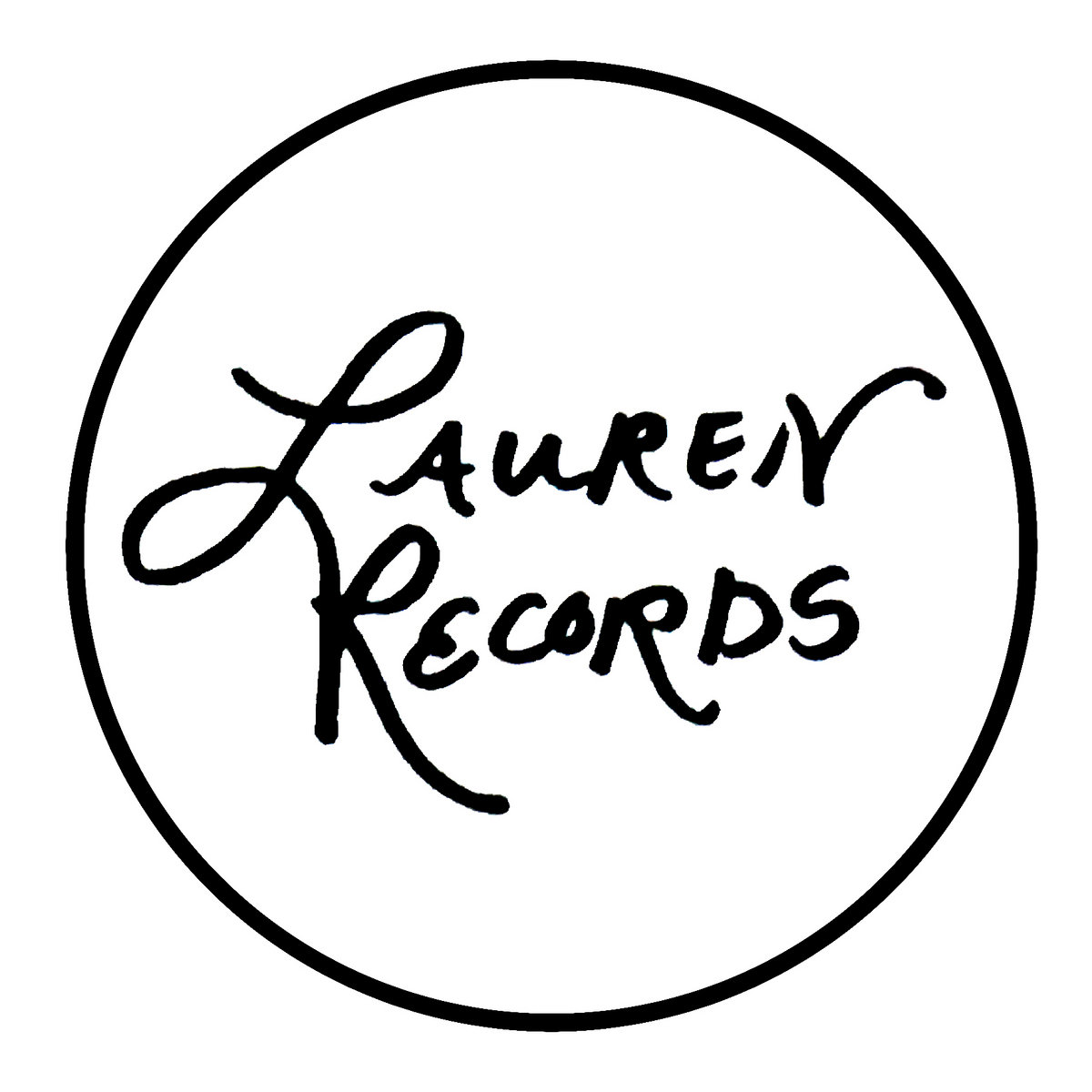
- Founded: 2011; 15 years ago
- Founder: Aaron Kovacs
- Distributors: Traffic Entertainment, LR-Distribution
- Genre: Punk
- Country of origin: United States
- Location: Southern California
- Official website: www.lauren-records.com

Lauren Records is an American independent record label founded in Southern California in 2011 by Aaron Kovacs. The label mostly specializes in indie rock, emo, and other melodic punk rock adjacent genres.

== History ==
Kovacs had experience booking shows and tours for local bands before he founded Lauren Records in 2011.

The first release was a compilation LP called I Think We Should Stay Away From Each Other featuring groups like AJJ, Japanther, Fishboy, and Joyce Manor. Initially supposed to be a home duplicated cassette with just local friends’ bands, as more bands expressed interest in putting a song on, it went from almost being a CD to just being an LP.

As of 2017 the label was still a one person endeavour.

== Notable artists ==
Some notable artists who have had music released by Lauren Records are:

- Adult Mom
- Antonioni
- AJJ
- Algernon Cadwallader
- The Bananas
- Benny The Jet Rodriguez
- Blowout
- Closer
- Colour Me Wednesday
- Dogbreth
- Diners
- Fishboy
- Good Luck
- Glocca Morra
- Guppy
- Hard Girls
- Hot Tang
- Japanther
- Joyce Manor
- Joyride!
- Katie Ellen
- Leer
- Peach Kelli Pop
- PENs+
- Real Life Buildings
- saoirse dream
- Shinobu
- Signals Midwest
- Spoonboy
- Summer Vacation
- SUPERWORLD
- together PANGEA
- The Total Bettys
- Upset
- Walter Etc.
- Walter Mitty and His Makeshift Orchestra
- Winter Break
- Sunday Cruise
