= Fake Problems =

American indie rock band

- Origin: Naples, Florida, United States
- Genres: Indie rock, punk rock, emo, folk punk
- Years active: 2005–2014
- Labels: Sabot Productions, Good Friends Records, Side One Dummy Records
- Members: Chris Farren; Derek Perry; Sean Stevenson; Brian Blount
- Past members: Casey Lee
- Website: Official Website

Fake Problems were a four-piece indie rock band from Naples, Florida. They released their first full-length album, How Far Our Bodies Go, on Sabot Productions on April 27, 2007. Their second record, It's Great to Be Alive, was released through Side One Dummy Records on February 17, 2009. Their third record Real Ghosts Caught On Tape was released September 21, 2010, also on Sideonedummy. The band broke up in 2014.

== Biography ==
=== History and background ===
Fake Problems was created by Chris Farren, Derek Perry, Casey Lee, and Sean Stevenson in 2005. Farren was in another band at the time, but he wanted to expand his creativity and write different music. All of the band members grew up in Naples and have known each other since they were about 14 years old.

The members have been able to make the band a full-time obligation by allowing for a relentless touring schedule. Stevenson gave up an opportunity to go to Berklee College of Music in Boston for film scoring. Members Lee and Perry also had a side project called Stay & Fight, which has now dissolved.

The band released music videos for two songs from It's Great to Be Alive: "The Dream Team" and "Diamond Rings." Diamond Rings was also featured on the third episode of Season 1 of NBC's "Trauma." They've also released a video from their latest record, which has been heavily featured on MTV.

In 2012, Fake Problems announced that Casey Lee was leaving the band. Lee was temporarily replaced by Brian Blount of Vega Under Fire.

=== Music style and influences ===
Fake Problems is heavily influenced by several genres of music, including emo, indie rock, and country music. In various older songs mandolin, violin, lap-steel/slide guitar, and brass horns can be heard along with the guitars and drums. The band claims that they have been influenced by Look Mexico, Cursive, Bright Eyes, Amon Düül II, and The Good Life.

=== Tours ===
To date, they have toured with Against Me!, The Gaslight Anthem, Into It. Over It, Bomb the Music Industry, Riverboat Gamblers, Say Anything, Look Mexico, Lemuria, Anti-Flag, Frank Turner, Thursday, The Dillinger Escape Plan, Murder by Death, Laura Stevenson and the Cans, Duran Duran, Tito Puente, Musical Youth, The Builders and the Butchers, Nevershoutnever, A Rocket to the Moon, Andrew Jackson Jihad and more. They played the entirety of Warped Tour in 2010.

=== Real Problems ===
In April 2006, the band's equipment was stolen during a tour with O Pioneers!!!. The band was robbed of two Fender Stratocasters, a flying "V" guitar, a Danelectro Remake by Jay Johnson bass, a microKorg, and a lap-steel/slide guitar. They finished the tour, but had to borrow equipment from O Pioneers!!! and then buy new instruments.

The song Real Problems in SRQ is based on an incident on October 18, 2006, Farren, Lee, and Stevenson were arrested and charged with trespassing. They were scheduled to play a show in Sarasota, Florida and had arrived a few hours early. Before their set, they had climbed a strip mall roof. As they were climbing off the roof, police entered the parking lot. The band members were arrested and were held until they received bail at about 2:00 am the following morning. The court ordered them to take anger management classes. This incident was also discussed in episode 8 of the Wing Nuts podcast, a podcast hosted by Farren and Lee, where Farren mistakenly said that the incident took place in December.

On an early 2008 tour with Smoke or Fire, the band was driving through Tennessee to their next show, when a giant turkey flew through their window. Two shows were canceled and the band had to stay at a motel in Cleveland TN for the weekend while the windshield was repaired.

While in Canada on October 19, 2008, the band stopped at a hotel before border crossing to discover their trailer on fire. Faulty wiring caused some protective foam to catch fire, resulting in some damage to Stevenson's kit.

On February 29, 2012, the band released a post on their website stating that Casey Lee had formally left the band on good terms and the band's friend Brian would be filling in on touring duties.

=== Fourth studio album, Antarctigo Vespucci, and Dissolution ===
In late 2012, it was announced that the band was working on a new record for a 2014 release. In the first half of 2013, the band started playing two new songs, rumored to be titled Try and Old Friends.

The band officially began to dissolve in 2013, but played a handful of concerts in 2014 before touring stopped. In 2015, they released a 7-inch EP called Strange Emotions of two songs leftover from their scrapped fourth studio album after being officially broken up. Chris explained in an interview with CLRVYNT that the release of Strange Emotions "reminded me of a terrible time in my life. It felt like a dream dying. Casey quit in 2011. It used to feel special, and then it stopped feeling special. It felt like we were just a band." Fake Problems finished recording their fourth studio album, but as Chris went on to say that "we didn't like it. When we found out we didn't like it, we realized it was over. We never put it out." He went on to detail how he tried to work with professional songwriters to try and find make what he could of the leftovers, but to no result.

On April 8, 2014, Chris Farren released a collaborative record with Bomb The Music Industry! frontman Jeff Rosenstock under the name Antarctigo Vespucci. The album, titled Soulmate Stuff, features original Fake Problems guitarist Casey Lee as well as guest work by Laura Stevenson and Benny Horowitz from The Gaslight Anthem. Antarctigo Vespucci also released the EP, I'm So Tethered, on October 30, 2014.

Fake Problems' dissolution was officially confirmed via Antarctigo Vespucci in a press release for their album Love in the Time of E-Mail on October 26, 2018.

== Final members ==
- Chris Farren – vocals and guitar
- Derek Perry – bass
- Sean Stevenson – drums
- Brian Blount – guitar

== Past members ==
- Casey Lee - Guitar

== Discography ==
=== Studio albums ===
- How Far Our Bodies Go (2007, Sabot Productions)
- It's Great to Be Alive (2009, SideOneDummy)
- Real Ghosts Caught on Tape (2010, SideOneDummy)

=== EPs ===
- Too Much Like Home (2001, For Documentation Only Records)
- From a Fashion Standpoint (2004, For Documentation Only Records)
- Oh No! (2005, Self Released)
- Spurs & Spokes (2006, Sabot Productions)
- Spurs & Spokes/Bull Matador (2006, Sabot Productions)
- Viking Wizard Eyes Wizard Full Of Lies (2008, Good Friends Records)
- Sugar EP (2013, Fake Problems)

=== 7" singles ===
- Dream Team (2009, SideOneDummy)
- Soulless (2010, SideOneDummy)
- Songs For Teenagers (2011, SideOneDummy)
- Strange Emotions: Holy Attitude (2015)

=== Splits ===
- Fake Problems/Any Day Now (2005, Self Released)
- Fake Problems/Look Mexico - Under The Influence Vol. 1 (2008, Suburban Home Records)
- Fake Problems/Ninja Gun (2009, Sabot Productions)
- Florida Doesn't Suck: Fake Problems/You Blew It! (2013, Topshelf Records)

=== Demos ===
- Watching the Bull Get the Matador (2005, Self Released)

=== Music videos ===
- The Dream Team (2009)
- Diamond Rings (2009)
- Soulless (2010)
- Songs for Teenagers (2011)
