= Katie Ellen =

American punk band

- Origin: Philadelphia, Pennsylvania
- Genres: Punk rock, power pop, indie rock, emo
- Years active: 2015 – Present
- Labels: Lauren Records
- Spinoff of: Chumped
- Members: Anika Pyle; Dan Frelly; Lou Hanman; Anthony Tinnirella
- Past members: Eric Sheppard; Mike Guggino

Katie Ellen are an American punk band based in Philadelphia, Pennsylvania. They were formed in 2015 by Anika Pyle and Dan Frelly after the dissolution of their previous band Chumped. They have released a 7" single, an EP and an album, Cowgirl Blues in 2017, all on Lauren Records.

== History ==
After Chumped parted ways at the end of 2015, Anika Pyle and Dan Frelly formed the initial two-piece incarnation of Katie Ellen. Pyle named the band after the broadcasting name of her great grandmother - a journalist and radio host on KTLN in Colorado who was sued by her station after continuing to use the name in other aspects of her career.

While Chumped leant toward pop punk in their style, Pyle has said that for Katie Ellen she was looking more to '60s girl groups, Patsy Cline, and Amy Winehouse for influence. NPR later compared them to Swearin' or P.S. Eliot.

The duo quickly released their first demo EP, Wild <3, in January 2016. That year they performed on bills with Jeff Rosenstock, Cayetana, and Thin Lips.

They released the "TV Dreams" single in October 2016 on Southern California based label Lauren Records, around the time of which Eric Sheppard and Anthony Tinnirella joined the band.

Their debut album, Cowgirl Blues, was released in July 2017 also on Lauren. A year later the band released an EP entitled Still Life.

== Discography ==
=== Albums ===
- Cowgirl Blues - Lauren Records, 12" LP, CD, Cassette, MP3, (2017)

=== EP ===
- Wild <3 - Self Released, MP3, (2016)
- Still Life - Lauren Records, 12" EP, CD, Cassette, MP3, (2018)

=== Singles ===
- TV Dreams - Lauren Records, 7" Single, MP3, (2016)
