= Asbestos Records =

American record label

- Founded: 1996
- Founder: Matt Flood; Dave Leone
- Genre: Ska, punk
- Country of origin: US
- Official website: www.asbestosrecords.com

Asbestos Records is an American independent record label in Stratford, Connecticut, United States, founded in 1996. It was established as a business to release albums and compilations for local bands, and to book shows at the Newtown Teen Center.

Over the next eight years, Asbestos Records released albums from Connecticut bands including Slackjaw, Grover Dill, and West Beverly, whose members went on to join bands such as Dropkick Murphys, In Pieces, Staring Back, and Punchline.

The label was also the home of the first four album covers by artist Rob Dobi, known for his parody of emo fashion, How to Dress Emo, and his clothing company Full Bleed.

In 2007, the label began a project to reissue popular Third-Wave Ska albums from defunct labels, including albums by The Mighty Mighty Bosstones, The Suicide Machines, The Slackers, Spring Heeled Jack, The Toasters, and Mustard Plug. The label was also involved in reissuing the portion of They Might Be Giants' discography that was originally released on Elektra Records.

In a collaboration between Asbestos Records, Chicago's Underground Communiqué Records and Ska Is Dead, the three labels started a "Ska Is Dead" 7-inch subscription series made up of six split 7-inch records, each featuring two currently active ska bands.

In 2023, Asbestos Records released John Hinckley Jr.'s album, Redemption.

The label's offices were flooded in August 2024.
