= Quote Unquote Records =

American independent record label

- Founded: 2006
- Founder: Jeff Rosenstock
- Genre: Indie rock • punk rock • ska punk • power pop • pop punk
- Country of origin: United States
- Location: Long Island, New York
- Official website: www.quoteunquoterecords.com

Quote Unquote Records is a donation-based online independent record label, founded and run by Bomb the Music Industry! and The Arrogant Sons of Bitches frontman Jeff Rosenstock. The label is an example of Rosenstock's DIY ideals. Many of the label's artists have personal connections, and all of the music released by the label is available as a free download from its website, along with an array of lyrics and photos. In fact, the label does not sell any material of any kind, and the website's headline bills the label as "The First Ever Donation Based Record Label".

Rosenstock explains the modest success of Quote Unquote Records by stating, "The donations that come in are not huge, but since we don’t spend that much money they pile up." Most donations are more than the $5 suggestion. During October 2008, the Quote Unquote Records web site was shut down over alleged copyright infringement in publishing its own songs; however, the site was quickly restored.

== Artists ==
- Antarctigo Vespucci
- Archipelago
- The Arrogant Sons of Bitches
- Barnaby Jones
- Binary Heart
- Boboso
- Bomb the Music Industry!
- The Brass
- The Brave Little Abacus
- Cheap Girls
- Cheeky
- Chewing On Tinfoil
- Chotto Ghetto
- Cold Electrics
- Good Shade
- Hard Girls
- Jeff Rosenstock
- Kudrow
- Lee Hartney Sex Drive
- Lenin/McCarthy
- Let Me Crazy
- Laura Stevenson and the Cans
- The Livingbrooks
- The Matt Kurz One
- The Max Levine Ensemble
- Mike Huguenor
- O Pioneers!!!
- Pegasuses-XL
- Pteradon
- The Riot Before
- Roar
- Rick Johnson Rock and Roll Machine
- Shinobu
- The Taxpayers
- Very Okay
- The Wild
- We Versus The Shark

== See also ==
- DIY
- Pay what you want
- List of record labels
