= Jeff Rosenstock discography =

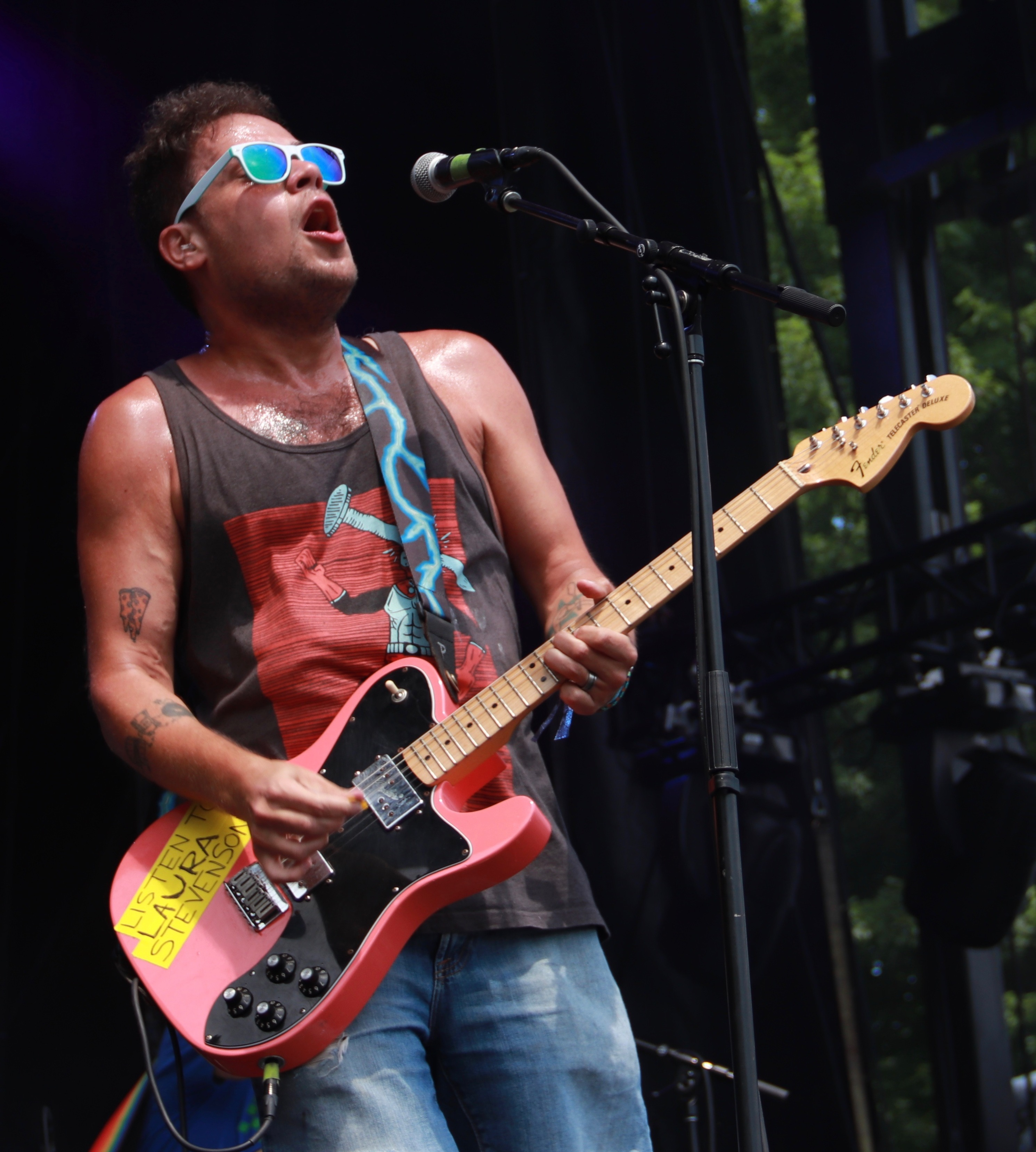
- Studio albums: 5
- EPs: 5
- Live albums: 2
- Singles: 15
- Music videos: 11

Jeff Rosenstock, an American rock musician, has released five studio albums, two live albums, five extended plays (EPs), one mixtape, fifteen singles, and eleven music videos.

== Albums ==
=== Studio albums ===
List of studio albums, with selected chart positions
Title	Details	Peak chart positions	
Title	Details	US Ind.	US Heat
We Cool?	Released: March 3, 2015; Label: SideOneDummy Records / Quote Unquote; Formats: CD, LP, cassette, digital download	31	7
Worry	Released: October 14, 2016; Label: SideOneDummy Records / Quote Unquote; Formats: CD, LP, digital download	24	20
Post-	Released: January 1, 2018; Label: Polyvinyl / Quote Unquote / Specialist Subject; Formats: CD, LP, cassette, digital download	7	1
No Dream	Released: May 20, 2020; Label: Polyvinyl / Quote Unquote; Formats: CD, LP, cassette, digital download	—	5
Ska Dream	Released: April 20, 2021; Label: Polyvinyl / Quote Unquote; Formats: CD, LP, cassette, digital download	—	—
Hellmode	Released: August 31, 2023; Label: Polyvinyl	TBA	

=== Live albums ===
Title	Details
Live and Acoustic at Vinyl Paradise	Released: January 24, 2017; Label: Quote Unquote; Format: DD
Thanks, Sorry! (as Death Rosenstock)	Released: October 18, 2019; Label: Quote Unquote / Really; Format: LP, digital download

== Mixtapes ==
Title	Details
I Look Like Shit	Released: October 23, 2012; Label: Quote Unquote; Format: LP, CD

== Extended plays ==
Title	Details
Little Elephant – Live Sessions	Released: 2016; Label: Little Elephant; Formats: 12" vinyl
Little Elephant – Live Sessions 2	Released: 2017; Label: Little Elephant; Formats: 12" vinyl
Jeff Rosenstock / Skasucks	Released: June 21, 2017; Label: World Domination, Inc. / Quote Unquote; Formats: 7" vinyl
Still Young (with Laura Stevenson)	Released: November 12, 2019; Label: Polyvinyl; Formats: 12" vinyl, digital download
2020 Dump	Released: 2020; Label: Quote Unquote; Formats: Digital download
Younger Still (with Laura Stevenson)	Released: November 3, 2022; Label: Polyvinyl; Formats: 12" vinyl, digital download

== Singles ==
Title	Year	Album
"Summer"	2013	Non-album singles
"Hey Allison!"	2014	Non-album singles
"I'm So Gross"	2015	Non-album singles
"You, in Weird Cities"	2015	We Cool?
"Festival Song"	2016	Worry
"Wave Goodnight to Me"	2016	Worry
"Planet Luxury"	2016	Worry
"Blast Damage Days"	2016	Worry
"Pash Rash"	2017	Worry
"Dramamine"	2017	Non-album single
"Melba"	2018	Post-
"All This Useless Energy"	2018	Post-
"The Beauty of Breathing"	2019	No Dream
"Monday at the Beach"	2019	No Dream
"Ambient 7"	2019	Non-album single
"Liked U Better"	2023	Hellmode
"Doubt"	2023	Hellmode
"Healmode"	2023	Hellmode

== Music videos ==
List of music videos, showing year released and directors/animators
Title	Year	Director(s)/Animator(s)
"Amen"	2012	Bryan Schlam
"Nausea"	2015	Bryan Schlam
"You, In Weird Cities"	2015	Sara Crow
"Hall of Fame"	2015	Philip Stone
"Wave Goodnight to Me"	2016	Benjamin Epstein and David Combs
"Planet Luxury"	2016	James Brown
"Blast Damage Days"	2016	Clay Tatum
"Pash Rash"	2017	Benjamin Epstein and David Combs
"Melba"	2018	Benjamin Epstein and David Combs
"All This Useless Energy"	2018	Benjamin Epstein and David Combs
"9/10"	2018	Joren Cull
"Scram!"	2020	Teenage Stepdad
"LIKED U BETTER"	2023	Ryan Baxley
"DOUBT"	2023	Deena Beck, Dashawn Mahone and Najja Porter
