= Skatune Network =

American ska musician and YouTuber

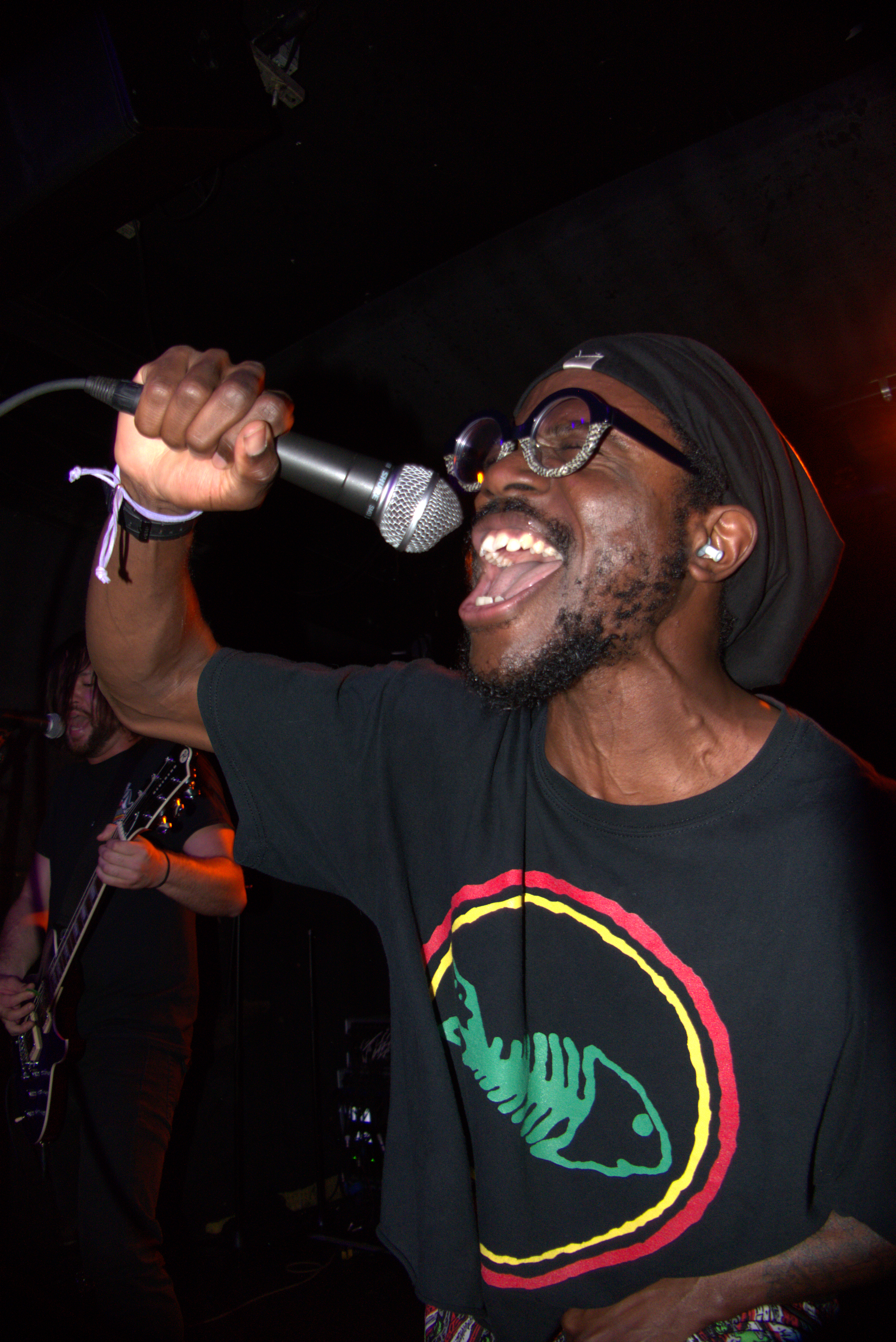

Background information
- Also known as: Jer Hunter; JER
- Born: Jeremy Andrew Hunter; June 16, 1995 (age 31)
- Origin: Gainesville, Florida
- Genres: Ska; punk rock
- Instruments: Trombone; trumpet; guitar; bass; keyboards; saxophone; tuba; vocals
- Years active: 2012–present
- Labels: Bad Time Records; Counter Intuitive
- Member of: We Are The Union
- Formerly of: 11:59; Omnigone; The Bruce Lee Band; Death Rosenstock
- Website: skatunenetwork.com

TikTok information
- Page: Skatune Network
- Followers: 442.8 thousand

YouTube information
- Channel: Ska Tune Network
- Years active: 2016–present
- Subscribers: 240 thousand
- Views: 14.7 million
- Last updated: March 26, 2023

Jeremy Andrew "Jer" Hunter (born June 16, 1995) is an American YouTuber, musician, composer and music educator who hosts the YouTube channel Skatune Network, where they (Note: Hunter is non-binary and uses they/them pronouns.) post ska covers of popular songs. They have also released original music under the name JER, played trombone for ska punk band We Are the Union since 2015, and performed on albums by The Bruce Lee Band, Jeff Rosenstock, and Illuminati Hotties. Prominent on social media, Hunter has been outspoken about the history and current state of ska music, earning the fan nickname "The CEO of Ska". BrooklynVegan has written, "You can't talk about the renewed interest in ska without talking Jeremy Hunter", while music critic Anthony Fantano has described them as "a one-person ska wrecking crew".

== Early life ==
Hunter was born on June 16, 1995 and grew up in Broward County, Florida. They discovered ska as a child via the Digimon: The Movie soundtrack, which featured ska bands Less Than Jake and The Mighty Mighty Bosstones. In sixth grade, Hunter reluctantly joined the school band at the urging of their parents, where they played trumpet and trombone. They also took piano lessons and learned bass guitar because "everyone plays guitar but nobody plays bass", and by high school had taken on a wide variety of instruments.

Hunter attended West Broward High School and graduated in 2013. Hunter's love of ska was deepened by high school friends, who introduced them to the music of Asian Man Records as well as the local DIY ska and punk scenes. In between high school and college, Hunter worked at the all-ages DIY punk venue The Talent Farm in Pembroke Pines, Florida, where they became involved with the local scene, forming a band, helping book shows in the area, and beginning to write their own music. From 2011 to 2017, they were in the ska band Funkman's Inferno, in which they played bass. After a brief stint at Broward College, Hunter moved to Gainesville in 2015 to attend Santa Fe College, where they studied musical composition with plans of becoming a film score composer. Hunter was a member of the Bluecoats Drum Corps, marching in the 2016 and 2017 seasons, playing euphonium. In addition to their career as a ska musician, Hunter works as an instructor for multiple high schools and drum corps during marching season.

== Career ==
Hunter posted a number of songs to SoundCloud between 2012 and 2016. They also fronted an emo side project, 11:59, that was sporadically active from 2014 to 2019.

=== We Are The Union ===
In 2015, Hunter joined the ska punk band We Are the Union on trombone and backing vocals, marking their return from a three-year hiatus. Hunter, a fan of the band since high school, had jokingly asked on Facebook if the band needed a trombonist, and frontwoman Reade Wolcott, who had seen a video of Hunter performing one of their songs, invited them to join. Hunter at the time had felt alienated from the ska scene due to experiences of racism, and has credited We Are the Union with reigniting their love of the genre.

Hunter wrote most of the horn lines for the band's 2018 album Self Care, and performed on that album as well as Ordinary Life (2021), released on Bad Time Records. Hunter and the band also performed at The Fest in 2015 and 2021.

=== Skatune Network ===
In December 2016, Hunter, having recently purchased recording equipment, began posting ska demos to Facebook, including a joke Christmas cover of José Feliciano's "Feliz Navidad" (entitled "Feliz NaviSKA"). That cover, as well as a similar rendition of "Auld Lang Syne" for New Year's Eve, were unexpectedly popular on the site, inspiring Hunter to start the Skatune Network YouTube channel. An early cover of "January 10, 2014" by The World Is a Beautiful Place & I Am No Longer Afraid to Die was shared by the band on social media, and within a week of launching the channel, Hunter had acquired over 2,000 subscribers. That number would expand to 100,000 by August 2019 and 200,000 by December 2021.

After an April 2018 cover of the Mii channel theme went viral, Hunter began regarding Skatune Network as a "full-time job" rather than a side venture. A November 2018 cover of La Dispute's "Such Small Hands and Nobody Not Even The Rain" was requested by the band themselves; that same month saw Hunter begin touring Skatune Network as a full-live band with shows in St. Petersburg and Orlando, Florida. In February 2019, their cover of PUP's "Free At Last", off their album Morbid Stuff, was one of 253 fan covers included in the song's official music video. Later in 2019, Hunter returned to The Fest with Skatune Network, backed by members of We Are The Union and billed alongside Against Me!, Bad Cop/Bad Cop, Jawbreaker, Less Than Jake, Dag Nasty, Joyce Manor, and Screaming Females; they also played the festival again in 2021, playing a back-to-back set with Hunter's band We Are The Union and joining acts like Hot Water Music, Frank Turner, and The Wonder Years. In February 2023, Hunter collaborated with fellow YouTube musician Ali Spagnola on a ska cover of Taylor Swift's "Anti-Hero". They have been a musical guest at MAGFest in 2020 and 2023.

The subjects of Hunter's Skatune Network covers are eclectic and wide-ranging, encompassing 1980s pop music, emo, and R&B as well as songs and theme music from films, television shows, and video games. Hunter has also released Skatune Network albums through Counter Intuitive Records since 2019, variously themed around the Billboard Hot 100, emo, Cartoon Network's Cartoon Cartoons, Undertale, Animal Crossing, the Beach Bunny album Honeymoon, and Halloween and Christmas music. John Ochoa of Vice noted that Hunter's "range of genres" and "self-aware exploitation of meme and internet culture, like Steven Universe and Adventure Time stan communities" has helped Skatune Network find greater exposure beyond ska and punk circles.

=== JER ===
Hunter's music as JER first appeared on benefit compilation albums in mid-2020: demos of "R/Edgelord" and "A Message to My Future Self" were included on Skank for Choice's 2020 Quarantine Compilation in May, while "Breaking News! Local Punk Denies Existence of Systematic Racism" appeared on Bad Time Records, Asian Man Records, and Ska Punk Daily's Ska Against Racism compilation in early September. "R/Edgelord was officially released as the project's first single on September 18, with We Are The Union's Reade Wolcott producing and tenor saxophone from Abraskadabra's Thiago "Trosso" de Sá Jorge; a debut studio album was tentatively announced for 2021. This was followed by the official releases of "Breaking News! Local Punk Denies Existence of Systematic Racism" on October 30 and "A Message to My Future Self" on December 11.

In a February 2022 interview, Hunter mentioned that the JER album was still "in the works", and that the project was "a lot more personal" than their previous work. In April, it was announced that the album, titled Bothered / Unbothered would be released on May 27, 2022, via Bad Time Records; a new lead single, "Clout Chasers!", was released alongside the announcement. Two more singles, "Decolonize Yr Mind" featuring Oceanator and "Nobody Can Dull My Sparkle", were released in advance of the album. Produced by Wolcott, the album did not feature any of the three previous singles but instead featured nine new songs as well as a cover of Jimmy Cliff's "You Can Get It If You Really Want." Additionally, Hunter partnered with BrooklynVegan for a limited-edition canary yellow vinyl variant of the album. The album was well-received: BrooklynVegan and Punknews.org included the album in Best of 2022 lists, Pitchfork's Nina Corcoran called it "a modern classic in the ska-punk canon", and music critic Anthony Fantano awarded the album an 8/10 score and included it on his 2022 "Loved List".

In June 2022, Hunter joined ska band and Bad Time labelmate Kill Lincoln for an East Coast/Midwest tour, including a BrooklynVegan-presented show at Saint Vitus in New York. They subsequently performed at the 2023 South by Southwest, alongside acts including Algiers, We Are the Union, Be Your Own Pet, Blondshell, The Callous Daoboys, Cheekface, Conway the Machine, Eshu Tune, Flo Milli, Genesis Owusu, Isabella Lovestory, Soul Glo, Sudan Archives, Tomberlin, and Voxtrot.

In June 2025, Hunter announced their new album Death of the Heart, which released on August 15 via Bad Time Records. The announcement came with the single "The Way You Tune It Out."

=== Other work ===
Hunter played brass on the soundtrack for Steven Universe: The Movie (2019), having been recruited by series composer Aivi Tran via Twitter, and later performed at the show's New York Comic Con panel alongside Estelle and Sarah Stiles. They also contributed music to Craig of the Creek and composed for YouTuber TomSka's animated web series #Content and Crash Zoom.

Outside of their music career, Hunter has worked as a music educator, including teaching marching band at Santa Fe High School and West Broward High School. They joined the Bluecoats Drum and Bugle Corps' 2023 Brass Educational Team as an instructor, having performed with them in 2016 and 2017. They have also been an instructor and euphonium technician with Pacific Crest Drum and Bugle Corps. Hunter and Bluecoats announced their 2026 creative partnership for Bluecoats' SoundSport Ensemble, Rhythm IN BLUE.

Hunter is prominently active on social media. They have credited Tumblr as the source of Skatune Network's first 20,000 subscribers, as Steven Universe storyboard artist (and later Craig of the Creek co-creator) Ben Levin had reblogged their cover of "Giant Woman". In addition to the Skatune Network YouTube channel, they host livestreams several nights a week on Instagram, TikTok, and Twitch, where they interact with viewers. Twitch streams often involve Hunter recording ska covers in real time and playing video games like Animal Crossing. Hunter also uses social media to promote smaller ska artists, including through a regularly updated Twitter thread, a Spotify playlist, and year-end YouTube videos, as well as discussing the history of ska, misconceptions about the genre, and issues within the scene. As of March 2023, Hunter had over 200k subscribers on YouTube and over 400k followers on TikTok.

== Artistry ==
John Ochoa of VICE described the typical sound of Skatune Network covers as "somewhere between bratty punk, dub-tinged ska, and loungey jazz, and often all three in one single track." Their JER music, meanwhile, incorporates rocksteady, early Jamaican ska, 2 Tone, third wave/ska-punk, and New Tone Ska with elements of genres like indie rock, emo, and hip hop.

Hunter grew up on ska punk bands like Less Than Jake, The Mighty Mighty Bosstones, Reel Big Fish, Streetlight Manifesto, and The Aquabats; 1970s soul and funk artists like Al Green and Earth, Wind & Fire; as well as 1980s hip-hop; and jazz. They have also highlighted the influence of ska artists like Desmond Dekker, Fishbone, Tokyo Ska Paradise Orchestra, Hepcat, and The Specials, with Hepcat and The Specials influencing Skatune Network and Fishbone influencing JER. Outside of ska, Hunter has expressed admiration for emo/indie rock artists like The World Is a Beautiful Place, A Great Big Pile of Leaves, Ratboys, The Promise Ring, The Get Up Kids, Really From, Hop Along, Tigers Jaw, Rozwell Kid, Camp Cope, Slingshot Dakota, and Lemuria; hip-hop/R&B artists like Silk Sonic, MF Doom, and Freddie Gibbs; and chiptune music. They also draw influence from Cartoon Network shows of their childhood, comparing JER to "the music you hear on the battle of the bands episode" of such shows.

The lyrics for JER emphasize political themes of anti-racism, labor rights, and intersectionality through Hunter's own personal experiences.

Hunter has occasionally been critical towards ska band The Interrupters for their dubious political views, particularly with lead vocalist Aimee Allen, due to her past appearances on InfoWars, supporting Ron Paul, denying the Columbine High School massacre, and for having allegedly homophobic and racist views.

== Personal life ==
Hunter is queer, non-binary, and polyamorous and uses they/them pronouns.

Outside of music, Hunter is passionate about science, particularly environmental and nutritional science, and has said they would have gone into those fields had music not taken off. They are vegan, and briefly hosted a ska-themed vegan cooking series called Up Beat Eats on their YouTube channel.

== Discography ==
=== We Are The Union ===
- Self Care (2018)
- Ordinary Life (2021)

=== As Skatune Network ===
==== Albums ====
Year	Album	Label
2019	Pick It the Fuck Up	Counter Intuitive
2020	Ska Goes Emo, Vol. 1	Counter Intuitive
2020	Skatune Skatoons!	Counter Intuitive
2020	Despite Everything, It's Still You.	Counter Intuitive
2020	A Very Skatune Christmas	Counter Intuitive
2021	You Are Filled With Determination	Fangamer
2021	Ska Goes Emo, Vol. 2	Counter Intuitive
2021	Greetings from Ska Shores	Counter Intuitive
2021	Burn the Billboard	Counter Intuitive
2021	Skalloween	Counter Intuitive
2021	Pick It the Fuck Up 2	Counter Intuitive
2022	Honeyrude	Counter Intuitive
2023	Ska Goes Emo, Vol. 3	Counter Intuitive

==== Singles ====
Year	Single	Source	Album
2019	"Cold Raviolis"	Graduating Life	Pick It the Fuck Up
2020	"Determination	Toby Fox (Undertale Soundtrack)	Despite Everything, It's Still You.
2020	"Enemy Approaching"	Toby Fox (Undertale Soundtrack)	Despite Everything, It's Still You.
2020	"All I Want for Christmas Is You" (ft. Woolbright)	Mariah Carey	A Very Skatune Christmas
2021	"Your Graduation"	Modern Baseball	Ska Goes Emo, Vol. 2
2021	"I Write Sins, Not Tragedies" (ft. Insignificant Other)	Panic! at the Disco	Ska Goes Emo, Vol. 2
2021	"Redbone"	Childish Gambino	Burn the Billboard
2021	"Toxic" (ft. Get Tuff)	Britney Spears	Burn the Billboard
2021	"Kiss Me thru the Phone" (ft. Boy Jr.)	Soulja Boy	Burn the Billboard
2021	"Next to You"	Macseal	Pick It the Fuck Up 2
2021	"Santa Claus Is Coming to Town"	Eddie Cantor	A Very Skatune Christmas (Deluxe Edition)
2021	"The Christmas Song" (ft. Really From)	Nat King Cole	A Very Skatune Christmas (Deluxe Edition)
2021	"Toy Day"	Animal Crossing	A Very Skatune Christmas (Deluxe Edition)
2022	"As It Was"	Harry Styles	non-album single
2022	"Runnin' Down a Dream"	Tom Petty	non-album single
2022	"Wii Sports"	Theme from Wii Sports	non-album single
2022	"Wii Would Like to Play"	Wii music	non-album single
2022	"Yer Dead Right, Mate"	Dave Wakeling (Scooby-Doo! Mystery Incorporated)	non-album single
2022	"Jump in the Line"	Harry Belafonte	non-album single
2022	"Grim Grinning Ghosts"	The Haunted Mansion (Disney)	non-album single
2022	"Shake It"	Metro Station	Ska Goes Emo, Vol. 3
2022	"Tetris"	Theme fromTetris	non-album single
2023	"(Sk)A-Punk" (ft. Jeff Rosenstock)	Vampire Weekend	non-album single
2023	"Anti-Hero (Ska Style)" (ft. Ali Spagnola)	Taylor Swift	non-album single
2023	"Underwater (Rude)Boi"	Turnstile	non-album single
2023	"Kids in America"	Kim Wilde	non-album single
2023	"Boy's a Liar Pt. 2" (ft. Eichlers)	Ice Spice	non-album single
2023	"Pokémon Johto"	Theme from Pokémon: The Johto Journeys	non-album single
2023	"Yoshi's Story"	Theme from Yoshi's Story	non-album single
2023	"A Thousand Miles"	Vanessa Carlton	non-album single
2023	"Hey Arnold!" (ft. Dom Palombi and Patrick Bartley)	Theme from Hey Arnold!	non-album single
2023	"How Do You Know It's Not Armadillo Shells?"	Hot Mulligan	Ska Goes Emo, Vol. 3
2023	"The World Ends on a Friday Night"	Funkman's Inferno	non-album single

=== As JER ===
==== Albums ====
- Bothered/Unbothered (2022; Bad Time Records)
- Death of the Heart (2025; Bad Time Records)

==== Singles ====
Year	Title	Album
2020	"R/Edgelord"	non-album single
2020	"Breaking News! Local Punk Doubts Existence of Systemic Racism!"	non-album single
2020	"A Message to My Future Self"	non-album single
2022	"Clout Chasers"	Bothered / Unbothered
2022	"Decolonize Yr Mind"	Bothered / Unbothered
2022	"Nobody Can Dull My Sparkle"	Bothered / Unbothered
2022	"Ska Has Progressed Past The Need For Incels"	non-album single
2023	"Another Unity Song"	non-album single
2024	"Say Gay or Say Goodnight" (ft. Money Nicca)	non-album single
2025	"The Way You Tune It Out"	Death of the Heart
2025	"Capitalism Breeds Devastation" (ft. Linqua Franqa)	Death of the Heart
2025	"I'd Like To Be Better"	Death of the Heart
2026	"Make It Make Sense"	non-album single

==== Music videos ====
Year	Title	Director
2022	"Clout Chasers"	Laila Fakhoury, Jeffé, Jahi Khalfani, Rae Mystic, and JER
2022	"Decolonize Yr Mind"	Laila Fakhoury, Rae Mystic, and JER
2022	"Nobody Can Dull My Sparkle"	Laila Fakhoury, Rae Mystic, and JER
2023	"Another Unity Song"	Rae Mystic

=== Compilation appearances ===
Year	Album	Song(s)	Compiler/Label	Notes
2020	Nailing Shards Of Hope Together: A Tribute To The Wonder Years	"Came Out Swinging" (as Skatune Network)	A Few Good Records	
2020	2020 Quarantine Compilation	"R/Edgelord", "A Message to My Future Self"	Skank for Choice	Benefitted South Texans for Reproductive Justice, Frontera Fund, and West Fund.
2020	Ska Against Racism	"Breaking News! Local Punk Doubts Existence of Systemic Racism!"	Ska Punk Daily Asian Man Records Bad Time Records	Benefitted Movement for Black Lives, NAACP Legal Defense Fund, the Alpha Institute, The Conscious Kid, and Black Girls Code

=== Other credits ===
Year	Artist	Recording	Role	Label
2018	Night Witch	"Witch Hunt" (single)	Horns	none
2019	Prince Daddy & the Hyena	Cosmic Thrill Seekers	Trombone	Counter Intuitive, Big Scary Monsters
2019	Various	Steven Universe: The Movie (Original Soundtrack)	Trumpet, trombone, euphonium (on "The Tale of Seven", "Isn't It Love?", and "Change")	WaterTower Music
2019	Omnigone	No Faith	Trombone	Bad Time Records
2020	Various	What Do You Know About Ska Punk? Volume 4	Trombone for Omnigone on "Stitch in Time"	
2020	Jeff Rosenstock	2020 DUMP EP	Performer on "Collapse!" and "ACAB"	Quote Unquote
2021	The Bruce Lee Band	Division in the Heartland EP	Trombone, vocals	Asian Man
2021	Catbite	Nice One	Trombone	Bad Time Records
2021	Jeff Rosenstock	Ska Dream	Trombone, trumpet	Quote Unquote, Polyvinyl
2021	Illuminati Hotties	Let Me Do One More	Trombone, trumpet	Hopeless
2022	The Bruce Lee Band	One Step Forward. Two Steps Back.	Trombone	Asian Man Records
2022	Gutless	Build and Burn	Trombone, tenor saxophone, and trumpet on "Burning the Bridge"	Knifepunch
2023	Jeff Rosenstock	Hellmode	Trombone (on "Will U Still U"), additional home recording	Polyvinyl
