= Jeremy Hunter =

Jeremy Hunter can refer to:

- Jeremy Hunter, real name of American ska musician Skatune Network
- Jeremy Hunter, All My Children character
- Jeremy Hunter, Shake It Up (American TV series) character
- Jeremy Hunter, former bassist of All Star United

== See also ==
- Jeremy Roach (full name Jeremy Hunter Roach), American college basketball player
