= Steven Universe soundtracks =

Soundtracks for the 2013–19 Cartoon Network television series

The following are the list of soundtracks for the animated television series Steven Universe created by Rebecca Sugar for Cartoon Network. Sugar also wrote the songs and musical numbers for the series, which are produced by the musician duo Aivi & Surasshu and jointly composed the title and ending themes for the series. The original soundtrack for the series, featuring a collection of songs were released in two volumes: Vol.1, featuring the musical numbers from the first four seasons, were released on June 2, 2017 and Vol. 2, featuring songs from the fifth season, released on April 12, 2019. The original soundtrack for Steven Universe: The Movie was released on September 1, 2019. The original score from each seasons in the series were released into separate albums during May–September 2020. The original soundtrack from the sequel series, Steven Universe Future, was released on October 23, 2020. Both the soundtracks and score albums were released by Turner Music Publishing, Cartoon Network, and WaterTower Music.

== Soundtrack albums ==
=== Volume 1 ===
Steven Universe, Vol. 1 (Original Soundtrack)

Soundtrack album by Various artists
- Released: June 2, 2017
- Genres: Pop; dance; rock; punk rock; arena rock; acoustic; ballad; contemporary R&B; children's music
- Length: 52:32
- Labels: Turner Music Group; Cartoon Network; WaterTower Music
- Producers: Aivi & Surasshu; Rebecca Sugar

Steven Universe soundtracks chronology
Steven Universe, Vol. 1 (Original Soundtrack) (2017)	Steven Universe, Vol. 2 (Original Soundtrack) (2019)

The soundtrack to Steven Universe was announced on April 12, 2017, with the first volume being set for release on a later date. In a Facebook live event hosted by Cartoon Network, the duo Aivi & Surasshu, performed few songs from the series and announced the release of the soundtrack for the first volume, Steven Universe, Vol. 1 (Original Soundtrack) on June 2.

==== Track listing ====
No.	Title	Lyrics	Music	Performer(s)	Length
1.	"We Are the Crystal Gems" (Main Title)	Sugar	Aivi & Surasshu; Rebecca Sugar	Zach Callison; Estelle; Deedee Magno Hall; Michaela Dietz	0:26
2.	"Let Me Drive My Van into Your Heart"	Sugar	Sugar; John Leftwich	Tom Scharpling	1:06
3.	"Cookie Cat"	Aivi & Surasshu	Jeff Liu	Callison	0:26
4.	"Giant Woman"	Aivi & Surasshu	Sugar	Callison	0:56
5.	"Strong in the Real Way"	Sugar	Sugar	Callison; Hall	1:41
6.	"Steven and the Stevens"	Liu; Ben Levin	Liu	Callison	0:42
7.	"Big Fat Zucchini"	Liu	Liu	Callison	0:34
8.	"Steven and the Crystal Gems"	Liu; Ben Levin	Liu	Callison; Estelle; Hall; Dietz	0:47
9.	"Dear Old Dad"	Aivi & Surasshu	Aivi & Surasshu	Callison; Scharpling	1:22
10.	"Be Wherever You Are"	Sugar	Sugar	Zach Callison	1:26
11.	"On the Run"	Aivi & Surasshu	Liu	Callison; Dietz	1:19
12.	"Comet" (Aivi & Surasshu)	Aivi & Surasshu	Nick DeMayo	Scharpling	2:05
13.	"Destiny"	Sugar	Aivi & Surasshu; Sugar	Scharpling	0:39
14.	"Lapis Lazuli"	Jo	Aivi & Surasshu; Hellen Jo	Callison	0:35
15.	"Wailing Stone"	Jo; Sugar	Jo; Sugar	Scharpling	0:59
16.	"Stronger Than You"	Aivi & Surasshu	Sugar	Estelle	2:52
17.	"Full Disclosure"	Levin; Liu; Sugar	Levin; Liu; Sugar	Callison	1:37
18.	"We Are the Crystal Gems" (Full Theme Song)	Sugar	Aivi & Surasshu; Sugar	Callison; Estelle; Hall; Dietz; Scharpling	2:26
19.	"The Jam Song"	Aivi & Surasshu	Aivi & Surasshu	Callison; Grace Rolek	0:41
20.	"Do It for Her"	Sugar	Sugar	Hall; Rolek	2:18
21.	"What Can I Do (For You)"	Aivi & Surasshu	Levin; Liu; Sugar	Susan Egan; Scharpling	2:29
22.	"Tower of Mistakes"	Aivi & Surasshu	Liu	Dietz	0:55
23.	"Haven't You Noticed (I'm a Star)"	Aivi & Surasshu	Sugar	Olivia Olson	1:05
24.	"Something Entirely New"	Aivi & Surasshu	Sugar	Erica Luttrell; Charlyne Yi	1:47
25.	"Peace and Love on the Planet Earth"	Aivi & Surasshu	Liu; Sugar	Callison; Estelle; Hall; Dietz; Shelby Rabara	1:52
26.	"Don't Cost Nothing"	Liu; Sugar	Liu; Sugar	Scharpling; Callison	0:58
27.	"Empire City"	Levin; Liu	Levin; Liu	Scharpling; Callison	0:46
28.	"Mr. Greg"	Levin; Liu; Joe Johnston	Levin; Liu	Scharpling; Callison; Hall; Eric Bauza	1:13
29.	"It's Over Isn't It"	Sugar	Sugar	Hall	2:18
30.	"Both of You"	Sugar	Sugar	Scharpling; Callison; Hall	1:47
31.	"Don't Cost Nothing" (Reprise)	Liu; Sugar	Liu; Sugar	Scharpling; Callison; Hall	0:49
32.	"I Think I Need a Little (Change)"	Levin; Liu; Sugar	Levin; Liu; Sugar	Scharpling	1:18
33.	"Here Comes a Thought"	Sugar	Sugar	Estelle; AJ Michalka	3:22
34.	"Still Not Giving Up"	Liu	Aivi & Surasshu	Callison	1:23
35.	"I Could Never Be (Ready)"	Aivi & Surasshu	Sugar	Scharpling	1:08
36.	"What's the Use of Feeling (Blue)?"	Sugar	Sugar	Patti LuPone; Hall	2:26
37.	"Love Like You" (End Credits)	Aivi & Surasshu	Aivi & Surasshu; Sugar	Sugar	2:23
Total length:					52:32

==== Reception ====
A review from the Geekiary magazine, stated "Since its inception, music has been at the core of Steven Universe. Built on a background of musical theater, with leitmotifs and fusion dances written into the very fabric of the show's lore and mythology, the show has delighted viewers with its wonderful music. Steven Universe Soundtrack Volume 1 is a collection of practically every single song from the show's first four seasons, and is a must have for any dedicated fan." Epicstream commented the musical songs, "a treat for any lover of musical cartoons" and praised the technical production and background music. Player One magazine wrote "Steven Universe's music has a combination of easy listening and boppy sci-fi touches that make it really pleasant to listen to".

Forces of Geek wrote the soundtrack "excels on all levels". David King of Bubble Blabber wrote "Next to the more modern animated shows such as Adventure Time, Star Vs the Forces of Evil, Gravity Falls, Legend of Korra and RWBY, Steven Universe has always been on-par with those shows in terms of quality & emotional writing and the combined efforts of Rebecca's writing and the voice cast's musical talents further excels as this Vol.1 soundtrack captures the most memorable & iconic tunes of the past four seasons."

==== Charts ====
===== Weekly charts =====
Weekly chart performance of Steven Universe, Vol. 2 (Original Soundtrack)
Chart (2017–2019)	Peak position
Belgian Albums (Ultratop Flanders)	174
UK Compilation Albums (OCC)	56
UK Album Downloads (OCC)	28
UK Soundtrack Albums (OCC)	9
US Billboard 200	22
US Independent Albums (Billboard)	1
US Soundtrack Albums (Billboard)	2

===== Year-end charts =====
Yearly chart performance of Steven Universe, Vol. 2 (Original Soundtrack)
Chart (2017)	Peak position
US Soundtrack Albums (Billboard)	23

==== Vinyl edition ====
In March 2018, a vinyl edition of the soundtrack was published by Iam8bit production company, that featured all the songs from the four seasons, into separate vinyl editions of the release. The set has four discs of 10 inch, with different colors, representing the titular character and the Crystal Gems (Garnet, Amethyst, Pearl) and center labels packed in a gatefold jacket. The edition also featured a special poster and artwork designed and illustrated by Chromosphere. The vinyl edition was released on March 9, 2018.

=== Volume 2 ===
Steven Universe, Vol. 2 (Original Soundtrack)

Soundtrack album by Various artists
- Released: April 12, 2019
- Genres: Pop; rock; punk; acoustic; contemporary R&B; children's music
- Length: 24:03
- Labels: Turner Music Group; Cartoon Network; WaterTower Music
- Producers: Aivi & Surasshu; Rebecca Sugar

Steven Universe soundtracks chronology
Steven Universe, Vol. 1 (Original Soundtrack) (2017)	Steven Universe, Vol. 2 (Original Soundtrack) (2019)	Steven Universe (Karaoke Edition) (2019)

The track list of Steven Universe, Vol. 2 (Original Soundtrack) was released on April 9, 2019, with the official soundtrack releasing on April 12.

==== Track listing ====
No.	Title	Writer(s)	Performer(s)	Length
1.	"The Working Dead"	Aivi & Surasshu; Sugar; Levin; Liu	Kate Micucci	2:14
2.	"Sadie Killer and the Suspects"	Aivi & Surasshu; Sugar; Levin; Liu	Micucci; Lamar Abrams; Reagan Gomez-Preston	0:53
3.	"G-G-G-Ghost"	Aivi & Surasshu; Sugar; Levin; Liu	Micucci	1:53
4.	"That Distant Shore"	Aivi & Surasshu; Sugar; Liu; Grant Henry	Jennifer Paz	1:46
5.	"Ruby Rider"	Liu; Henry	Charlyne Yi	2:03
6.	"For Just One Day Let's Only Think About (Love)"	Aivi & Surasshu; Sugar	Callison; Hall; Dietz; Scharpling; Shelby Rabara; Uzo Aduba	3:48
7.	"Familiar"	Aivi & Surasshu; Sugar	Callison	2:32
8.	"Escapism"	Aivi & Surasshu; Sugar	Michalka; Callison; Rolek	2:01
9.	"Let Me Ska My Van into Your Heart"	Micucci		0:40
10.	"We Are the Crystal Gems (Change Your Mind Version)"	Aivi & Surasshu; Sugar	Callison	2:08
11.	"Change Your Mind"	Sugar	Callison	0:54
12.	"Love Like You (Reprise)"	Aivi & Surasshu; Sugar	Sugar	3:11
Total length:				24:03

==== Charts ====
Weekly chart performance of Steven Universe, Vol. 2 (Original Soundtrack)
Chart (2019)	Peak position
US Billboard 200	109
US Independent Albums (Billboard)	28
US Soundtrack Albums (Billboard)	24
US Kid Albums (Billboard)	14

=== Karaoke edition ===
Steven Universe (Karaoke)

Soundtrack album by Various artists
- Released: April 12, 2019
- Genre: Karaoke
- Length: 24:32
- Labels: Turner Music Group; Cartoon Network; WaterTower Music
- Producers: Aivi & Surasshu; Rebecca Sugar

Steven Universe soundtracks chronology
Steven Universe, Vol. 1 (Original Soundtrack) (2017)	Steven Universe (Karaoke) (2019)	Steven Universe The Movie (Original Soundtrack) (2019)

Steven Universe (Karaoke), an album featuring the karaoke version of the songs featured in the series, was released along with the Vol. 2 soundtrack on April 12, 2019.

No.	Title	Length
1.	"We Are the Crystal Gems: Main Title"	0:26
2.	"Do It for Her"	2:19
3.	"Stronger Than You"	2:53
4.	"We Are the Crystal Gems: Full Theme"	2:26
5.	"It's over Isn't It"	2:19
6.	"Here Comes a Thought"	3:21
7.	"Love Like You: End Credits"	2:23
8.	"That Distant Shore"	1:46
9.	"Familiar"	2:32
10.	"Escapism"	2:01
11.	"We Are the Crystal Gems (Change Your Mind Version)"	2:06
Total length:		24:32

=== Steven Universe: The Movie ===
Steven Universe: The Movie (Original Soundtrack)

Soundtrack album by Various artists
- Released: September 2, 2019
- Recorded: 2017–2019
- Genres: Rock; pop; soul; funk; contemporary R&B
- Length: 1:08:26
- Label: WaterTower Music
- Producers: Aivi & Surasshu; Jeff Ball; Rebecca Sugar; Stemage; James Fauntleroy; Mike Krol; Ted Leo; Chance the Rapper

Steven Universe soundtracks chronology
Steven Universe (Karaoke) (2019)	Steven Universe: The Movie (Original Soundtrack) (2019)	Steven Universe: Season 1 (Original Score) (2020)

Singles from Steven Universe The Movie (Original Soundtrack)
- 1. "True Kinda Love" Released: July 19, 2019

Singles from Steven Universe the Movie (Original Soundtrack) [Deluxe Version]
- 1. "Other Friends (Radio Edit)" Released: October 18, 2019

Steven Universe: The Movie (Original Soundtrack) is the soundtrack to the 2019 television film Steven Universe: The Movie, based on the Cartoon Network animated television series Steven Universe. The soundtrack was released on September 2, 2019, by WaterTower Music immediately following the film's television premiere, and features 17 songs performed by the film's cast, with songwriters including Chance the Rapper, James Fauntleroy, Gallant, Ted Leo, Mike Krol, and Grant Henry amongst several others, collaborating with director Rebecca Sugar. It also includes the original film score composed by Aivi & Surasshu, who worked on the series. The deluxe edition of the album (featuring demo versions of a few songs) was released on November 15, and both editions were also released on vinyl.

==== Singles ====
The first single from the film's soundtrack, "True Kinda Love", performed by Estelle and Zach Callison, was released on July 19, 2019. "Other Friends", another track from the film, had an edited version (billed as a "Radio Edit", despite "Other Friends" never being promoted to radio airplay) cutting the intro containing dialouge from the film, on October 18, 2019, also including Spanish and Portuguese versions of the edit, performed by Dorisvell Costa and Vic Brow, respectively. Both singles are no longer available as standalone releases on most platforms.

==== Track listing ====
Track listing and credits adapted from Apple Music and Tidal.

Steven Universe the Movie (Original Soundtrack)
No.	Title	Writer(s)	Producer(s)	Length
1.	"The Tale of Steven (Christine Ebersole, Lisa Hannigan, Patti LuPone)"	Jeff Ball; Rebecca Sugar	Aivi & Surasshu; Ball; Sugar	1:17
2.	"Once Upon a Time"	Ball	Aivi & Surasshu; Ball	0:55
3.	"Message to the Universe"	Ball	Ball	0:36
4.	"Let Us Adore You (Ebersole, Hannigan, LuPone, Callison)"	Jeff Liu; Sugar	Aivi & Surasshu; Sugar	1:00
5.	"Home Sweet Home"		Aivi & Surasshu	1:14
6.	"Happily Ever After (Callison, Deedee Magno Hall, Estelle, Michaela Dietz, Tom Scharpling, Uzo Aduba, Jennifer Paz, Shelby Rabara)"	Liu; Sugar	Aivi & Surasshu; Sugar	5:10
7.	"The Arrival"		Aivi & Surasshu	0:53
8.	"Other Friends (Sarah Stiles, Callison, Hall, Estelle, Dietz)"	Liu; Sugar	Aivi & Surasshu; Sugar	2:47
9.	"One on One"		Aivi & Surasshu	1:02
10.	"system/BOOT. PearlFinal (3).Info (Hall, Scharpling, Callison, Charlyne Yi, Erica Luttrell, Dietz, Stiles)"	Liu; Sugar	Aivi & Surasshu; Sugar	3:01
11.	"With Friends Like These"		Aivi & Surasshu	0:59
12.	"Crystal Gem Huddle"		Aivi & Surasshu	1:52
13.	"Who We Are (Aduba, Callison, Paz, Rabara, Stiles)"	Sugar	Aivi & Surasshu; Sugar	2:53
14.	"Hijinks Will Ensue"		Aivi & Surasshu	1:56
15.	"Isn't It Love? (Estelle)"	Estelle; James Fauntleroy; Sugar	Aivi & Surasshu; Fauntleroy	1:26
16.	"Search Party"		Aivi & Surasshu	0:20
17.	"Echoes of Friendship"		Aivi & Surasshu	0:30
18.	"No Matter What (Callison, Dietz)"	Liu; Sugar	Aivi & Surasshu; Sugar	2:11
19.	"Our Handshake"		Aivi & Surasshu	0:26
20.	"No Ordinary Injector"		Aivi & Surasshu	2:12
21.	"Disobedient (Kate Micucci, Dietz)"	Mike Krol; Sugar	Krol; Sugar	2:27
22.	"Let's Duet"	Stemage	Stemage	1:06
23.	"Independent Together (Ted Leo, Hall, Aimee Mann)"	Leo; Sugar; Stemage	Aivi & Surasshu; Sugar; Stemage; Leo	3:16
24.	"Running Out of Time"		Aivi & Surasshu	0:32
25.	"Feelings Flooding Back"	Ball	Aivi & Surasshu; Ball	0:40
26.	"A Special World"		Aivi & Surasshu	1:09
27.	"Drift Away (Stiles)"	Mann; Sugar	Aivi & Surasshu; Sugar	3:13
28.	"Found (Stiles, Callison)"	Liu; Sugar	Aivi & Surasshu; Sugar	1:26
29.	"Downward Spiral"		Aivi & Surasshu	2:40
30.	"True Kinda Love (Estelle, Callison)"	Aivi Tran; Chancelor Bennett; Estelle; Fauntleroy; Julian Sanchez; Macie Stewart; Sugar; Steven Velema	Aivi & Surasshu; Bennett; Fauntleroy	4:54
31.	"The Missing Piece"	Ball	Aivi & Surasshu	2:06
32.	"Change (Callison)"	Liu; Sugar	Aivi & Surasshu; Sugar	1:33
33.	"Not Good at All"		Aivi & Surasshu	1:20
34.	"There's No Such Thing as Happily Ever After"		Aivi & Surasshu	1:07
35.	"Are We Interrupting Something?"	Ball	Aivi & Surasshu	1:55
36.	"Let Us Adore You (Reprise) (Ebersole, Hannigan, LuPone, Stiles)"	Liu; Sugar	Aivi & Surasshu; Sugar	1:52
37.	"Finale (Callison, Hall, Estelle, Dietz, Grace Rolek, Aduba, Paz, Rabara, Micucci, Matthew Moy, Scharpling, Toks Olagundoye)"	Gallant; Sugar	Aivi & Surasshu; Sugar	2:02
38.	"True Kinda Love [Music Video] (Bonus Track) (Estelle, Callison)"	Tran; Bennett; Estelle; Fauntleroy; Sanchez; Stewart; Sugar; Velema		2:37

Deluxe Version
No.	Title	Writer(s)	Length
39.	"Other Friends (Radio Edit) (Stiles, Callison, Hall, Estelle, Dietz)"	aivi & surasshu; Liu; Sugar	1:45
40.	"The Tale of Steven (Rough Demo) (Sugar)"	Sugar	1:27
41.	"No Matter What (Demo) (Sugar, Liu)"	Liu; Sugar	2:12
42.	"Independent Together (Demo) (Sugar, Leo)"	Sugar; Leo	3:23
43.	"Found (Demo) (Sugar, Liu)"	Liu; Sugar	1:23
44.	"Disobedient (Demo) (Sugar)"	Krol; Sugar	2:29
45.	"Other Friends (Rough Demo) (Sugar)"	Liu; Sugar	2:03
46.	"Finale (Concept) (Gallant)"	Gallant; Sugar	1:39

==== Personnel ====
Credits for the album are adapted from Genius

- Uzo Aduba — featured artist (tracks 6 and 37), primary artist (track 13)
- Jeff Ball — musician, primary artist, producer, songwriter, string player, violinist, violist
- Zach Callison — dialogist, featured artist (tracks 1, 4, 8, 10, 30 and 38), lead vocalist, primary artist (tracks 6, 13, 18, 28, 32 and 37), voiceover artist
- Chance the Rapper — producer, songwriter
- Michaela Dietz — featured artist (tracks 8, 10 and 37), primary artist (tracks 6, 18 and 21)
- Christine Ebersole — featured artist (track 36), primary artist (tracks 1 and 4)
- Chromosphere — album artist
- Michael Evans — cellist
- James Fauntleroy — guitarist, producer, songwriter
- Christopher Joseph Gallant III - songwriter
- Deedee Magno Hall — featured artist (tracks 8, 10 and 37), primary artist (tracks 6 and 23)
- Lisa Hannigan — featured artist (track 36), primary artist (tracks 1 and 4)
- Grant "Stemage" Henry — guitarist, primary artist, producer, songwriter
- Jeremy Hunter — euphophonist, trombonist, trumpeter
- Travis Kindred — bassist, contrabassist
- Mike Krol — producer, songwriter
- Ted Leo — primary artist (track 23), producer, songwriter
- Jeff Liu — musician, songwriter
- Patti LuPone — featured artist (track 36), primary artist (tracks 1 and 4)
- Erica Luttrell — featured artist (track 10)
- Aimee Mann — primary artist (track 23), songwriter
- Kate Micucci — featured artist (track 37), primary artist (track 21)
- Joanne Moo — harpist
- Matthew Moy — featured artist (track 37)
- Michaela Nachtigall — violinist, violist
- Kristin Naigus — wind arranger
- Toks Olagundoye — featured artist (track 37)
- Marc Papeghin — hornist
- Piper Payne — mastering engineer, mixing engineer
- Jennifer Paz — featured artist (tracks 6, 13 and 37)
- Shelby Rabara — featured artist (tracks 6, 13 and 37)
- Lena Raine — mastering engineer, mixing engineer
- Edwin Rhodes — guitarist
- Grace Rolek — featured artist (track 37)
- Patti Rudisill — violinist, violist
- Julian "Zorsy" Sanchez — songwriter, key person
- Tom Scharpling — featured artist (tracks 6 and 10)
- Macie Stewart — songwriter
- Sarah Stiles — featured artist (tracks 8, 10, 13 and 36), primary artist (tracks 27 and 28)
- Rebecca Sugar — album producer, musician, omnichord player, producer, songwriter
- Estelle Swaray — featured artist (tracks 8, 30 and 37), lead vocalist, primary artist (tracks 6, 15 and 38), producer, songwriter
- Aivi Tran — album producer, arranger, keyboardist, musician, pianist, primary artist, producer, songwriter, synthesizer player
- Steven "Surasshu" Velema — album producer, arranger, keyboardist, musician, pianist, primary artist, producer, songwriter, synthesizer player
- Charlyne Yi — featured artist (track 10)

==== Charts ====
Weekly chart performance of Steven Universe The Movie (Original Soundtrack)
Chart (2019)	Peak position
US Billboard 200	57
US Independent Albums (Billboard)	6
US Soundtrack Albums (Billboard)	5

==== Release history ====
Release dates and formats for Steven Universe The Movie (Original Soundtrack)
Region	Date	Format(s)	Edition	Label	Ref.
Various	September 1, 2019	CD; digital download; streaming	Standard	WaterTower; Iam8bit	
Various	September 27, 2019	Vinyl	Standard	WaterTower; Iam8bit	
Various	November 15, 2019	CD; digital download; streaming	Deluxe	WaterTower; Iam8bit	
Various	December 6, 2019	Vinyl	Deluxe	WaterTower; Iam8bit	

=== Steven Universe Future ===
Steven Universe Future (Original Soundtrack)

Soundtrack album by Various artists
- Released: October 23, 2020
- Length: 92:57
- Labels: Turner Music Group; Cartoon Network; WaterTower Music
- Producers: Aivi & Surasshu; Jeff Ball; Rebecca Sugar

Steven Universe soundtracks chronology
Steven Universe: Season 5 (Original Television Score) (2020)	Steven Universe Future (Original Soundtrack) (2020)

The soundtrack to the sequel series Steven Universe Future was released on October 23, 2020.

No.	Title	Writer(s)	Featuring	Length
1.	"Steven Universe Future (Opening Theme) / Title Card"	Aivi & Surasshu; Rebecca Sugar	Zach Callison; Deedee Magno Hall; Estelle; Michela Dietz; Shelby Rabara; Stemage; Joanne Moo; Jeff Ball	0:30
2.	"Happy Welcome Back Day"	Aivi & Surasshu		1:03
3.	"A Different Life"	Aivi & Surasshu		0:41
4.	"Little Homeschool"	Aivi & Surasshu		1:27
5.	"Out of Patience"	Aivi & Surasshu		2:05
6.	"Pink Steven"	Aivi & Surasshu		0:56
7.	"Smoky to the Rescue"	Aivi & Surasshu		2:09
8.	"Wy-Six and Friends"	Aivi & Surasshu		0:59
9.	"So Many Rose Quartzes"	Aivi & Surasshu		1:41
10.	"More Like Siblings"	Aivi & Surasshu		1:39
11.	"I Am Shell"	Aivi & Surasshu		1:32
12.	"Cracking Under Pressure"	Aivi & Surasshu		1:28
13.	"Empathy - Pearl & Volleyball's Fusion"	Aivi & Surasshu		1:16
14.	"Prince Pearl"	Aivi & Surasshu		1:42
15.	"Come On Down to Little Homeschool"	Jeff Ball		0:33
16.	"Bluebird"	Aivi & Surasshu		1:03
17.	"Your Best Friend, Rainbow"	Aivi & Surasshu		1:11
18.	"The Tidying Song"	Aivi & Surasshu; Amish Kumar	Alastair James	1:12
19.	"Onion's House of Horror"	Aivi & Surasshu; Jeff Ball		0:36
20.	"Sunstone's Safety Zone"	Aivi & Surasshu		2:07
21.	"Steven Tag"	Aivi & Surasshu		2:16
22.	"Ultimate Steven Tag"	Aivi & Surasshu		1:59
23.	"Family Together"	Aivi & Surasshu		0:39
24.	"Everything Is so Bright"	Jeff Ball		1:19
25.	"Shining Through"	Aivi & Surasshu	Jennifer Paz; Jeff Liu; Stemage; Jeff Ball	1:45
26.	"Little Graduation"	Jeff Ball		2:03
27.	"Looking Forward"	Aivi & Surasshu; Rebecca Sugar	Kate Micucci; Kristin Naigus; Jeff Ball; Travis Kindred	1:32
28.	"Lars, Stop!"	Aivi & Surasshu		2:09
29.	"Garden of Friends"	Aivi & Surasshu; Jeff Ball		2:16
30.	"Cactus Steven"	Aivi & Surasshu; Jeff Ball		2:33
31.	"Peridot & Steven Productions"	Jeff Ball		1:50
32.	"Bismuth Consultation"	Jeff Ball		1:06
33.	"Cam's Camshafts"	Jeff Ball; Rebecca Sugar; Miki Brewster	Zach Callison	0:33
34.	"Steven & Connie"	Aivi & Surasshu		1:01
35.	"Scout Ruby / Scholar Sapphire"	Aivi & Surasshu		2:13
36.	"Steven's Gonna Propose!"	Rebecca Sugar; Jeff Ball	Zach Callison	0:34
37.	"I'd Rather Be Me (With You)"	Aivi & Surasshu; Rebecca Sugar	Zach Callison; Edwin Rhodes	1:39
38.	"The Proposal"	Aivi & Surasshu; Jeff Ball		1:14
39.	"Cake for One"	Aivi & Surasshu		1:15
40.	"Dogcopter 6: Till Death Do We Bark"	Jeff Ball		1:01
41.	"Dr. Maheswaran"	Aivi & Surasshu; Jeff Ball		0:58
42.	"Ice Cream à la Pie"	Aivi & Surasshu		1:32
43.	"Dad Museum 2.0"	Aivi & Surasshu; Jeff Ball		2:33
44.	"Mr. Universe"	Aivi & Surasshu; Jack Pendarvis	Jemaine Clement	1:06
45.	"Three Day Montage"	Aivi & Surasshu; Jeff Ball		2:10
46.	"Steven vs. Jasper Rematch"	Aivi & Surasshu		2:03
47.	"Spinel Is so Much Better Now"	Aivi & Surasshu		0:40
48.	"Yellow's Reconstructive Work"	Aivi & Surasshu		1:55
49.	"My Little Reason Why"	Aivi & Surasshu; Rebecca Sugar	Lisa Hannigan	1:31
50.	"Please, Don't Follow Me"	Jeff Ball		1:01
51.	"Steven's Here to Help"	Aivi & Surasshu		1:47
52.	"I'm a Fraud..."	Aivi & Surasshu; Jeff Ball		1:18
53.	"I Am My Monster"	Aivi & Surasshu; Jeff Ball		2:11
54.	"He Needs Us This Time"	Aivi & Surasshu		1:20
55.	"Time to Show Steven Some Love"	Aivi & Surasshu		2:58
56.	"Cookie Cat (Crystal Gems Version)"	Ben Levin; Jeff Liu; Matt Burnett	Deedee Magno Hall; Michaela Dietz; Estelle	0:36
57.	"Farewell, Friends"	Aivi & Surasshu		2:36
58.	"Farewell, Dad"	Aivi & Surasshu		1:02
59.	"Farewell, Crystal Gems / Being Human"	Aivi & Surasshu; Edwin Rhodes; Emily Margaret; Beatrice Cowings; Rebecca Sugar; Roger Hicks; Travis Klndred	Emily King; Jeff Ball	3:04
60.	"Being Human (Single Version)"	Aivi & Surasshu; Edwin Rhodes; Emily Margaret; Beatrice Cowings; Rebecca Sugar; Roger Hicks; Travis Klndred	Emily King	1:46
61.	"I'd Rather Be Me (With You) [Single Version]"	Rebecca Sugar	Zach Callison	1:01
Total length:				92:57

== Score albums ==
The original score for all the five seasons were released individually for each season on May 29, June 26, July 31, August 28 and September 25, 2020, respectively.

=== First season ===
Steven Universe: Season 1 (Original Television Score)

Soundtrack album by Aivi & Surasshu
- Released: May 29, 2020
- Recorded: 2013–2015
- Genres: Chiptune; electronic; experimental; ambient
- Length: 67:22
- Labels: Turner Music Group; Cartoon Network; WaterTower Music
- Producers: Aivi & Surasshu

Steven Universe soundtracks chronology
Steven Universe The Movie (Original Soundtrack) (2019)	Steven Universe: Season 1 (Original Television Score) (2020)	Steven Universe: Season 2 (Original Television Score) (2020)

No.	Title	Length
1.	"Steven's Shield"	0:50
2.	"Pearl's Theme"	0:38
3.	"The Mother"	2:31
4.	"luv u (Greg's Theme)"	1:35
5.	"Dad Museum"	1:42
6.	"Water Damage / Atop the Sea Spire"	2:25
7.	"Connie's Theme"	3:00
8.	"Gimme Gimme"	0:53
9.	"Sunlit Battlefield / The Sleeping Pyramid"	1:06
10.	"Lion's Theme"	0:46
11.	"Amalgam (Amethyst & Pearl's Fusion Dance)"	1:39
12.	"Opal's Theme"	1:10
13.	"Heaven Beetle / Earth Beetle"	1:42
14.	"Dance of Swords"	0:53
15.	"Holo Pearl"	2:23
16.	"Lion's Ocean / Lion's Warp"	1:01
17.	"The Cave"	2:30
18.	"Rose's Room / Glitch City"	2:41
19.	"Synchronize (Garnet & Amethyst's Fusion Dance) / Sugilite's Theme"	1:23
20.	"Rose's Fountain"	1:04
21.	"Mirror Gem (Lapis' Theme)"	0:51
22.	"Let Me Out"	2:09
23.	"I Am Lapis Lazuli"	0:54
24.	"Night Drive"	0:39
25.	"Mirror Match"	2:37
26.	"Lapis' Tower"	2:21
27.	"Take My Hand"	0:39
28.	"Love Like You (The Ocean Returns)"	0:55
29.	"Alexandrite's Theme"	0:32
30.	"Watermelon Steven"	0:40
31.	"Lion's Mane / Rose Quartz's Theme"	1:10
32.	"Peridot's Theme"	1:15
33.	"Alone Together"	0:52
34.	"Twilight Run"	0:41
35.	"Be Cool at the Club"	3:51
36.	"Future Vision (Garnet's Theme)"	0:42
37.	"Defective"	1:26
38.	"Moonlit Battlefield"	1:29
39.	"I'm Still Here"	1:18
40.	"Half A Story / Connie to the Rescue"	1:58
41.	"Night Drive 2"	2:24
42.	"Return to the Beach / Jasper's Theme"	3:52
43.	"Reunion (Ruby & Sapphire's Fusion Dance)"	0:43
44.	"Collusion (Jasper & Lapis' Fusion Dance)"	0:38
45.	"Malachite's Theme"	0:53
Total length:		67:22

=== Second season ===
Steven Universe: Season 2 (Original Television Score)

Soundtrack album by Aivi & Surasshu
- Released: June 26, 2020
- Recorded: 2013–2015
- Genres: Chiptune; electronic; experimental; ambient
- Length: 32:30
- Labels: Turner Music Group; Cartoon Network; WaterTower Music
- Producers: Aivi & Surasshu

Steven Universe soundtracks chronology
Steven Universe: Season 1 (Original Television Score) (2020)	Steven Universe: Season 2 (Original Television Score) (2020)	Steven Universe: Season 3 (Original Television Score) (2020)

No.	Title	Length
1.	"Young Gems"	1:49
2.	"Amethyst's Theme"	1:04
3.	"Sky Arena / Let Me Do This For You"	2:06
4.	"Gem Shards"	2:50
5.	"Enticement (Pearl & Garnet's Fusion Dance)"	0:32
6.	"Sardonyx's Theme"	2:02
7.	"Luv u Dad (and Garnet)" (feat. Rebecca Sugar)	1:04
8.	"Reconciliation (Ruby & Sapphire's Fusion Dance 2)"	1:33
9.	"Forgiveness (Pearl & Garnet's Fusion Dance 2)"	1:37
10.	"Peridot's Escape"	1:17
11.	"We Are Malachite"	1:32
12.	"Mother And Daughter"	1:07
13.	"Theme From An Endless Romance"	3:24
14.	"Good Morning (SU Version)" (feat. John Conte)	0:59
15.	"Little Peridot"	1:00
16.	"Peridot In The Rain"	1:36
17.	"The Robolympics / Pearlbot Vs Peribot"	2:52
18.	"The Story Of Sapphire & Ruby"	1:24
19.	"The Rebels / Garnet's First Fusion"	1:29
20.	"The Answer"	1:13
Total length:		32:30

=== Third season ===
Steven Universe: Season 3 (Original Television Score)

Soundtrack album by Aivi & Surasshu
- Released: July 31, 2020
- Recorded: 2013–2016
- Genres: Chiptune; electronic; experimental; ambient
- Length: 53:16
- Labels: Turner Music Group; Cartoon Network; WaterTower Music
- Producers: Aivi & Surasshu

Steven Universe soundtracks chronology
Steven Universe: Season 2 (Original Television Score) (2020)	Steven Universe: Season 3 (Original Television Score) (2020)	Steven Universe: Season 4 (Original Television Score) (2020)

No.	Title	Length
1.	"Pearl Remix" (feat. Deedee Magno Hall)	2:52
2.	"Yellow Diamond"	2:37
3.	"Collaboration (Garnet, Amethyst & Pearl's Fusion Dance; Alexandrite vs. Malachite, Pt. 1)"	1:36
4.	"Alexandrite vs. Malachite, Pt. 2"	2:02
5.	"The Cluster / Gem Drill"	2:55
6.	"Inside The Cluster"	3:23
7.	"Lapis' Flight"	2:43
8.	"Hit The Diamond"	1:02
9.	"Hello, House!"	1:07
10.	"Macho Trance"	1:52
11.	"Lars for the Day"	1:06
12.	"Dire, Dire Drift"	2:30
13.	"The Final Drift"	0:56
14.	"Somewhere Alone at Sea"	1:07
15.	"You're a Monster"	3:19
16.	"Duel of the Quartz Soldiers – Amethyst vs. Jasper"	1:28
17.	"I'll Protect You – Stevonnie vs. Jasper"	1:08
18.	"Pearl Points / Objective Invention"	1:20
19.	"Steven vs. Amethyst"	2:38
20.	"Bismuth's Return to the Battlefield"	2:05
21.	"Bismuth's Forge"	2:36
22.	"Show Me What You Got"	1:01
23.	"Steven's Rituals"	0:29
24.	"The Breaking Point"	6:19
25.	"Consolation – Steven & Amethyst's Fusion Dance"	1:00
26.	"Smoky Quartz"	2:05
Total length:		53:16

=== Fourth season ===
Steven Universe: Season 4 (Original Television Score)

Soundtrack album by Aivi & Surasshu
- Released: August 28, 2020
- Recorded: 2013–2017
- Genres: Chiptune; electronic; experimental; ambient
- Length: 43:59
- Labels: Turner Music Group; Cartoon Network; WaterTower Music
- Producers: Aivi & Surasshu

Steven Universe soundtracks chronology
Steven Universe: Season 3 (Original Television Score) (2020)	Steven Universe: Season 4 (Original Television Score) (2020)	Steven Universe: Season 5 (Original Television Score) (2020)

No.	Title	Length
1.	"Stevonnie's Anxiety"	3:36
2.	"Smoky Quartz Meets Sardonyx"	1:45
3.	"Sardonyx Tonight! Medley"	2:30
4.	"One Big Super Right"	0:34
5.	"Good Influences"	0:30
6.	"Onion Gang"	2:31
7.	"No Gem Wars at the Table"	1:54
8.	"Andy's Flight"	2:15
9.	"Baby's First Glow"	3:38
10.	"STOP"	0:35
11.	"Blue Diamond"	2:28
12.	"Holly Blue Agate"	1:35
13.	"The Zoomans"	4:28
14.	"Famethyst"	1:03
15.	"That Will Be All"	1:36
16.	"Storm In The Room"	2:14
17.	"Lion's Desert"	1:44
18.	"Ube!"	0:38
19.	"Hey, Mr. Postman"	1:25
20.	"Aquamarine & Topaz"	2:18
21.	"Tension in the House"	0:49
22.	"Battle in Aquamarine's Ship / Steven's Sacrifice"	3:53
Total length:		43:59

=== Fifth season ===
Steven Universe: Season 5 (Original Television Score)

Soundtrack album by Aivi & Surasshu
- Released: September 25, 2020
- Recorded: 2013–2018
- Genres: Chiptune; electronic; experimental; ambient
- Length: 113:25
- Labels: Turner Music Group; Cartoon Network; WaterTower Music
- Producers: Aivi & Surasshu

Steven Universe soundtracks chronology
Steven Universe: Season 4 (Original Television Score) (2020)	Steven Universe: Season 5 (Original Television Score) (2020)	Steven Universe Future (Original Soundtrack) (2020)

No.	Title	Length
1.	"I Don't Wanna Be Alone"	2:29
2.	"Aquamarine Subdues Topaz"	1:47
3.	"The Trial: Pt. 1 (Green Zircon)"	2:53
4.	"The Trial: Pt. 2 (Blue Zircon)"	3:48
5.	"The Off Colors"	2:38
6.	"Lars...?"	1:08
7.	"Pink Lars"	1:02
8.	"Lion's Secret"	0:53
9.	"Goodbye Lars / Home At Last"	0:38
10.	"Lapis Leaves"	1:41
11.	"Family"	1:06
12.	"I Miss You (She Took The Barn)"	0:45
13.	"Shorty Squad in the Kindergarten"	1:09
14.	"The Train Home"	1:01
15.	"VROOM"	2:01
16.	"Kevin Party"	3:55
17.	"Best Friends Forever"	1:40
18.	"Lars of the Stars"	2:01
19.	"The Legend of Rose Quartz"	4:16
20.	"Jungle Moon"	0:47
21.	"Garnet & Steven Get Painted & Chase a Cat"	1:51
22.	"Orbservatory"	0:59
23.	"When I Go Back"	1:08
24.	"Pearl...?"	1:26
25.	"Find My Phone"	1:18
26.	"Going Deeper"	3:49
27.	"No One Can Know (Pearl & Pink Diamond's Secret)"	2:57
28.	"Sapphire's Anger"	0:55
29.	"The Ancient Kindergarten"	1:30
30.	"Rose & Pearl On Earth"	1:35
31.	"Ruby Alone"	2:09
32.	"Ruby's Decision"	0:52
33.	"The Question"	1:38
34.	"Steven the Wedding Planner"	0:41
35.	"I Now Pronounce You Garnet"	3:45
36.	"The Crystal Gems VS Blue Diamond"	2:18
37.	"Inner Mind / I Am Pink Diamond"	4:08
38.	"Diamond Reunion"	1:48
39.	"Healing Nephrite"	1:12
40.	"Launching the Legs"	0:53
41.	"The Pebbles"	0:50
42.	"Yellow Diamond's Sauna"	0:56
43.	"Blue Diamond's Onsen"	1:48
44.	"Steven and the Wolf"	0:56
45.	"Homeworld Waltz"	1:35
46.	"The Ball / Alone Together (Reprise)"	1:47
47.	"Watermelon Steven's Adventure"	1:58
48.	"I'm Not Sorry"	1:58
49.	"Blue Diamond's Remorse"	0:51
50.	"Confronting Yellow Diamond"	2:47
51.	"Yellow Diamond's Sorrow"	0:53
52.	"Falling! / Smoky Quartz"	1:31
53.	"Encouragement (Steven & Pearl's Fusion Dance)"	0:41
54.	"Rainbow Quartz 2.0 / We Fused!"	0:47
55.	"Integrity (Steven & Garnet's Fusion Dance)"	0:46
56.	"Sunstone"	1:40
57.	"Unity (The Crystal Gems' Fusion Dance)"	0:42
58.	"Obsidian"	3:02
59.	"White Diamond"	6:25
60.	"Steven Meets Pink Steven"	3:03
61.	"Everything's Pink"	2:09
62.	"The Return Home"	1:50
Total length:		113:25
