= Joren =

Joren is a Dutch masculine given name, equivalent to English George. Notable people with the name include:

- Joren Cull, Canadian illustrator, animator, and author
- Joren Dehond (born 1995), Belgian footballer
- Joren Dom (born 1989), Belgian footballer
- Joren van Pottelberghe (born 1997), Swiss ice hockey player

== See also ==
- Steven Jorens (born 1981), Canadian sprint canoer
