= Nausea (disambiguation) =

Nausea is the sensation of unease and discomfort in the stomach with an urge to vomit.

Nausea may also refer to:

- Nausea (band), an American crust punk band
- Nausea (novel) (La Nausée), a 1938 novel by Jean-Paul Sartre
- "Nausea" (Beck song), 2006
- "Nausea" (Jeff Rosenstock song), 2015
- "Nausea", a song by X on Los Angeles
- "Nausea", a song by Therapy? on Nurse
- "Nausea", a song by Hellyeah on Hellyeah
- "Nausea", a song by At The Gates on Slaughter of the Soul

== See also ==
- Ad nauseam
