= Kudrow =

Kudrow may refer to:

- Lisa Kudrow (b. 1963), American actress
- Kudrow (band), American indie rock band.
