= Ordinary Life (album) =

Studio album by We Are the Union
- Released: June 4, 2021
- Genre: Ska punk
- Length: 35:20
- Label: Bad Time Records
- Producer: Jon Graber

We Are the Union chronology
Self Care (2018)	Ordinary Life (2021)

Singles from Ordinary Life
- 1. "Morbid Obsessions" Released: April 23, 2021; 2. "Boys Will Be Girls" Released: May 7, 2021; 3. "Make It Easy" Released: May 21, 2021

Ordinary Life is the fifth studio album by American ska punk band We Are the Union, released on June 4, 2021, on DIY record label Bad Time Records. The album announcement came alongside a new single, "Morbid Obsessions", as well as lead singer Reade Wolcott coming out as a trans woman.

== Background ==
We Are the Union formed in 2005 in Ann Arbor, Michigan, and released three albums before going on a two-year hiatus from 2013 to 2015. In 2018, they released Self Care, with the album's themes being about depression and existential crises. Lead singer Reade Wolcott said “At that point, my focus was very pro-normalizing talking about mental health", as well as wanting to push conversations about mental health and writing songs about complex emotions. During a tour with Leftöver Crack in 2018, Wolcott fell asleep scrolling through a trans meme subreddit, to which she woke up the next day realizing she was a trans woman, to which she recalled “I remember feeling terrified, beyond my ability to reason, the biggest thing for me was the fear for my ability to live the life I want to.”

Wolcott officially came out on April 23, 2021. That same day, she made the announcement of the album, as well as the release of a single "Morbid Obsessions".

== Track listing ==
Ordinary Life track listing
No.	Title	Length
1.	"Pasadena"	2:42
2.	"Morbid Obsessions"	3:02
3.	"Short Circuit"	3:33
4.	"Broken Brain"	2:40
5.	"Make It Easy"	3:48
6.	"Boys Will Be Girls"	3:25
7.	"Wasted"	3:03
8.	"Big River"	3:14
9.	"Ordinary Life"	3:07
10.	"Everything Alone"	3:00
11.	"December"	3:42
Total length:		35:20

== Personnel ==
- Reade Wolcott - lead vocals, guitar
- Brandon Benson - bass guitar, backing vocals
- Ricky Weber - lead guitar
- Jer Hunter - trombone, backing vocals
- Brent Friedman - drums
