= We Are the Union =

American ska punk band

- 2021 promotional photo of We Are The Union.

Background information
- Origin: Ann Arbor, Michigan, United States
- Genres: Ska punk; ska; pop punk
- Years active: 2005–2013; 2015–present
- Labels: Youth Owned; Self-released; Paper + Plastick; Bad Time
- Members: Reade Wolcott; Brandon Benson; Ricky Weber; Devan Bentley; Jeremy Hunter
- Past members: See members section
- Website: wearetheunion.net

We Are the Union was an American ska punk band from Ann Arbor, Michigan, formed in 2005. The band has had many lineup changes since its inception, with vocalist/guitarist Reade Wolcott and bassist Brandon Benson as the only remaining original members. As of 2022, their live lineup often features guest horn players and touring members.

== History ==
=== Early years and hiatus (2005–2013) ===
The band formed in August 2005 in Ann Arbor, Michigan due to members being "unhappy with the current state of ska music." Their debut album, Who We Are, was released in 2007.

Who We Are would be followed by albums Great Leaps Forward in 2010 and You Can't Hide the Sun in 2012. In 2013, We Are the Union announced they were going on an indefinite hiatus, stating: "We've decided to take a hiatus from active status. […] We were a band. Maybe someday we will be again. We've had some amazing times, and we truly appreciate those of you who've contributed to our existence. We've never been a supercool hype band or uberpunx beardy band, so we thank each and every one of you who listened to our music over the years."

=== Return, Self Care, and Ordinary Life (2015–present) ===
The band returned from hiatus in 2015, with Jer Hunter of the YouTube channel Skatune Network joining the band on trombone. They released their fourth studio album, Self Care, in 2018. Following this album release, the band appeared on Audiotree, and released new singles in 2020.

In April 2021, We Are The Union announced a new album, Ordinary Life, to be released on June 4, 2021, via Bad Time Records. Along with the album announcement, lead vocalist Reade Wolcott came out as a trans woman, with much of the album exploring topics surrounding her transition.

In November 2022, it was announced that drummer Brent Friedman would be leaving the group.

== Influences and musical style ==
We Are the Union cites Lifetime, Kid Dynamite, Slapstick, Less Than Jake, and This Is A Standoff as influences. More recently, they have been influenced by indie pop and pop music.

== Discography ==
Adapted from Bandcamp, Spotify, Tumblr and YouTube

=== Studio albums ===
- Who We Are (2007)
- Great Leaps Forward (2010)
- You Can't Hide The Sun (2012)
- Self Care (2018)
- Ordinary Life (2021)

=== Extended plays ===
- The Grow Up Or Shut Up EP (2006, out of print)
- The Gun Show Must Go On (2009, digital only)
- Graveyard Grins (2011, digital only)
- You Can't B-Side The Sun (2014)
- Keep It Down (2015)

=== Singles ===
==== As lead artist ====
| Year | Title | Album |
|---|---|---|
| 2015 | "Call In Dead" | Keep It Down |
| 2018 | "What's Wrong With Me?" | Self Care |
| 2018 | "A Better Home" | Self Care |
| 2020 | "Goin' Down the Road Feelin' Bad" | Non-album single |
| 2020 | "Your Way, Your Time" | Non-album single |
| 2020 | "You're Dead / Vampire Ska" (Norma Tanega/Horny Toad cover) | Non-album single |
| 2020 | "I'm Working Retail For Christmas" | Non-album single |
| 2021 | "Fresh Fruit for Rotting Punk Rock Stars" | Non-album single |
| 2021 | "Rasputin" (Boney M. cover) | Non-album single |
| 2021 | "Morbid Obsessions" | Ordinary Life |
| 2021 | "Boys Will Be Girls" | Ordinary Life |
| 2021 | "Make It Easy" | Ordinary Life |
| 2021 | "Sound System" (Operation Ivy cover; ft. Eve 6) | Non-album single |
| 2022 | "OHMYGOD" (Eichlers cover) | Non-album single |
| 2022 | "Yr Always Alone (On Christmas)" | Non-album single |

==== As featured artist ====
| Year | Title | Album |
|---|---|---|
| 2021 | "Set It All On Fire" (Louser featuring We Are the Union) | Super Gwario Kart |
| 2021 | "2 OF US" (Eichlers featuring We Are the Union) | |

=== Demos ===
- The Grow Up Or Shut Up EP (2006, out of print)

=== Live albums ===
| Title | Album details |
|---|---|
| We Are The Union on Audiotree Live | Released: 2019; Label: Self-released, Audiotree; Format: Digital download, streaming |

=== Music videos ===
| Year | Song | Director | Ref |
|---|---|---|---|
| 2008 | "This is My Life (And It's Ending One Minute At A Time)" | Tyler Capehart | |
| 2012 | "We're Gonna Need A Bigger Boat" | Tyler Capehart, Joelle Andrés | |
| 2015 | "Call In Dead" (lyric video) | We Are the Union | |
| 2018 | "A Better Home" (lyric video) | We Are the Union | |
| 2018 | "Dust on the Hourglass" (acoustic in-studio) | We Are the Union | |
| 2018 | "What's Wrong With Me?" (lyric video) | We Are the Union | |
| 2020 | "Your Way, Your Time" | Chris Graue | |
| 2020 | "Pre-Expatriate" | Chris Graue | |
| 2020 | "You're Dead / Vampire Ska" | Chris Graue | |
| 2020 | "I'm Working Retail For Christmas" | Chris Graue | |
| 2021 | "Fresh Fruit For Rotting Punk Rock Stars" | Chris Graue | |
| 2021 | "Rasputin" | Chris Graue | |
| 2021 | "Morbid Obsessions" | Chris Graue | |
| 2021 | "Boys Will Be Girls" | Chris Graue | |
| 2021 | "Make It Easy" | Chris Graue | |
| 2021 | "Sound System" | Chris Graue | |
| 2022 | "OHMYGOD" | Reade Wolcott | |
| 2022 | "Surfing on the Waves of Caffeination" | Chris Graue | |
| 2022 | "December" | Rae Mystic | |
| 2022 | "Yr Always Alone (On Christmas)" | Rae Mystic | |

=== Compilation appearances ===
- Fall Sampler 2012 (2012, Paper and Plastick Records)
  - Features the track "Dead End" from You Can't Hide The Sun
- 2013 Summer Sampler (2013, Paper and Plastick Records)
  - Features the track "Dust on the Hourglass" also from You Can't Hide The Sun

== Band members ==
=== Current members ===
- Reade Wolcott – guitar, lead vocals (2005-2013, 2015-present)
- Brandon Benson – bass, backing vocals (2005-2013, 2015-present)
- Ricky Weber – lead guitar (2008-2013, 2015-present)
- Jer Hunter – trombone, backing vocals (2015-present)
- Devan Bentley - drums (2022–present)

=== Former members ===
- Emily Williams – tenor saxophone (2022–2024)
- Brent Friedman – drums (2015-2022)
- Jim Margle – drums
- Charlie Held – drums
- Trey Cook – drums
- John Ryan Jr. – saxophone
- Denni Skagalera – saxophone
- Matt Belanger – trombone
- David Lackey – trombone
- Barney – trombone
- Daniel Ray – trombone
- Ryan Collins – guitar
- Noah Fenton- guitar
- Ben Wixson – guitar
