= Worry (album) =

2016 studio album by Jeff Rosenstock

Studio album by Jeff Rosenstock
- Released: October 14, 2016
- Recorded: 2016
- Genre: Pop-punk; power pop
- Length: 37:42
- Label: SideOneDummy; Quote Unquote
- Producer: Jack Shirley

Jeff Rosenstock chronology
We Cool? (2015)	Worry (2016)	Post- (2018)

Singles from Worry
- 1. "Festival Song" Released: July 14, 2016; 2. "Wave Goodnight to Me" Released: September 7, 2016

Worry (stylized as WORRY.) is the second solo studio album by American rock musician Jeff Rosenstock, released on October 14, 2016 by SideOneDummy Records. Released over a year after his debut solo album We Cool?, Worry was recorded in April and May 2016 at a house in Stinson Beach, California. Much of the album was written shortly after Rosenstock's band's gear was stolen while on tour in 2015. Worry saw the former Bomb the Music Industry! and The Arrogant Sons of Bitches frontman achieve his greatest critical success, with numerous placements on year-end lists and previously unseen media exposure. The album addresses themes including urban gentrification, economic inequality and police brutality in the United States.

The album was promoted with two singles: "Festival Song", released on July 14, 2016, and "Wave Goodnight to Me", released on September 7, 2016. Rosenstock toured the album with Hard Girls, Katie Ellen, and local acts picked in each city.

The album cover is a photograph taken at Rosenstock's wedding in 2015.

The song "Perfect Sound Whatever" provided the inspiration for the title the book of the same name by James Acaster, in which Worry was featured.

== Background ==
After ska punk band Bomb the Music Industry! announced their breakup in 2014, frontman Rosenstock quickly released his first solo album We Cool? in 2015. On July 14, 2016, Rosenstock released a new song, "Festival Song", off a yet-to-be-titled new album out later in the year. On August 16, 2016, Rosenstock announced a tour with Hard Girls and Katie Ellen, with SideOneDummy Records hinting "Maybe that means a new album is coming soon? He did release a new song called 'Festival Song' recently. I don't know anything."

On September 7, 2016, Rosenstock announced the title and release date of the album along with the release of the album's second single, "Wave Goodnight to Me", which was given a music video filmed at Comet Ping Pong in Washington, D.C. and directed by Ben Epstein and David Combs of The Max Levine Ensemble.

== Composition ==
Clocking in at 37 minutes and containing 17 tracks, Worry has been described as pop punk and "anti-capitalist power pop". The final nine songs of the album segue into each other in a manner described as similar to The Beatles' Abbey Road and the compilation Short Music for Short People. The medley comprises various musical styles and genres, with the punk rock "Bang on the Door" flowing into the ska "Rainbow" into the hardcore punk "Planet Luxury". Rosenstock has named The Clash, Neutral Milk Hotel's On Avery Island, The Beach Boys' Smile and Less Than Jake as influences on Worry, specifically citing The Clash's double album London Calling as an inspiration for the short song structures on Worry's second half.

== Lyrical content ==
Worry explores political lyrical themes. Lead single "Festival Song" was written as a criticism of corporate-sponsored music festivals after Rosenstock witnessed a band at a festival condemn surveillance culture and corporations while surrounded by the same institutions. "I'm not trying to call anybody a sellout," Rosenstock said of the song. "I just feel like people, at this point, don't think that you can do it another way anymore. It's just so accepted. It's like, 'Oh yeah, we got to do this thing this way. There's going to be corporate sponsors on this thing.'" "The Fuzz" discusses police brutality, while "Wave Goodnight to Me" was written about the gentrification of Brooklyn pushing out longtime residents. "To Be a Ghost..." contains lyrics about the negative effects of internet and meme culture.

Rosenstock also discusses personal topics on Worry. Album opener "We Begged 2 Explode" discusses his feelings about whether or not being a musician was the right life choice for him; the album was written as Rosenstock was turning 34 years old. "Pash Rash" and "Blast Damage Days" reference the complications of technology and its effect on modern romance, with lyrics such as "These are the Amazon days / We are the binge-watching age / And we'll be stuck in a screen until our phones fall asleep." "I Did Something Weird Last Night" references 'irrational, giddy emotion' about falling in love, which Rosenstock wrote about his now-wife as the two were beginning their relationship.

Worry was Rosenstock's first release on SideOneDummy Records, which inspired him to specifically write more politically conscious lyrics due to the wider audience he knew the album would have on a bigger label. "I wanted these lyrics to be punk as fuck, to reflect that same feeling that reading the lyrics of Operation Ivy gave me when I was a teenager," Rosenstock said.

== Reception ==
Professional ratings
Aggregate scores
Source	Rating
Metacritic	80/100
Review scores
Source	Rating
AllMusic	3.5/5 stars
Consequence of Sound	B+
Exclaim!	8/10
Pitchfork	8.0/10
Substream Magazine	4.5/5 stars

Worry received critical acclaim from music critics. At Metacritic, which assigns a normalized rating out of 100 to reviews from mainstream critics, the album has an average score of 80 based on 6 reviews. USA Today proclaimed it the best album of 2016, declaring that "In 17 songs, Rosenstock tells his story, one that is also our story, about regrets and hopes and more regrets, about what it's like trying to maintain your humanity in a digital age, when you can sign on Facebook and find yourself 'amongst apologists who love ignoring the reality / of unarmed civilians executed publicly.'" Ian Cohen of Pitchfork stated that although "Rosenstock didn't really need a magnum opus to solidify his reputation as one of the most important figures in modern punk music", the potency of the album's political lyrical content was amplified following the election of Donald Trump less than a month after its release. Consequence of Sound wrote "Worry feels like the true start of Rosenstock's solo career, with a backing band that is finally locked in, a record label 100 percent behind him, and a tower of critical accolades growing taller each day." Timothy Monger of AllMusic said that "At times wistful and contemplative, frequently explosive, and pleasantly damaged, Worry holds true to its creator's D.I.Y. aesthetic and pop-punk/ska roots while continuing to emphasize his new power pop direction".

In 2019, Entertainment Weekly named Worry the ninth-best overlooked album of the decade, stating that it "was released less than a month before Donald Trump was elected, but it still feels like the most accurate depiction of how things have felt since he took office. The punk veteran was singing about gentrification, all-encompassing corporatization, and how our internet-induced anhedonia has made the bad things feel even worse."

== Track listing ==
No.	Title	Length
1.	"We Begged 2 Explode"	3:44
2.	"Pash Rash"	1:43
3.	"Festival Song"	2:54
4.	"Staring Out the Window At Your Old Apartment"	3:22
5.	"Wave Goodnight to Me"	3:00
6.	"To Be a Ghost..."	4:02
7.	"Pietro, 60 Years Old"	0:38
8.	"I Did Something Weird Last Night"	3:11
9.	"Blast Damage Days"	2:55
10.	"Bang on the Door"	1:03
11.	"Rainbow"	1:31
12.	"Planet Luxury"	0:30
13.	"Hellllhoooole"	1:46
14.	"June 21st"	1:04
15.	"The Fuzz"	1:59
16.	"...While You're Alive"	1:54
17.	"Perfect Sound Whatever"	2:36
Total length:		37:42

== Personnel ==
Band

- Jeff Rosenstock - vocals, guitar, keyboards, saxophone, etc.
- John DeDomenici - bass
- Mike Huguenor - guitar, backing vocals
- Kevin Higuchi - drums, percussion, backing vocals

Production

- Jack Shirley - recording, engineering, production, mixing, mastering
