= No Dream =

2020 studio album by Jeff Rosenstock

Studio album by Jeff Rosenstock
- Released: May 20, 2020
- Recorded: February 2020
- Studio: The Atomic Garden Recording Studios
- Genre: Punk rock; power pop
- Length: 40:14
- Label: Quote Unquote; Polyvinyl
- Producer: "Grammy Jack" Shirley

Jeff Rosenstock chronology
Post- (2018)	No Dream (2020)	Ska Dream (2021)

No Dream (stylized as N O D R E A M) is the fourth solo studio album by American singer-songwriter Jeff Rosenstock. It was released on May 20, 2020, without any promotional lead-up. The album was released on Polyvinyl Record Co. in the United States and by Specialist Subject Records in the United Kingdom. It is also available directly from the artist through Quote Unquote Records and Really Records.

Ten percent of proceeds from any digital sales made from the album are being donated to the Food Not Bombs mutual aid network.

On April 20, 2021 Rosenstock released Ska Dream (stylized as S K A D R E A M), a fully rerecorded rendition of the album as a ska album.

== Critical reception ==
Professional ratings
Aggregate scores
Source	Rating
AnyDecentMusic?	7.9/10
Metacritic	85/100
Review scores
Source	Rating
AllMusic	3.5/5 stars
Beats Per Minute	79%
Exclaim!	8/10
Pitchfork	8.0/10
Under the Radar	8.5/10

No Dream was met with universal acclaim reviews from critics. At Metacritic, which assigns a weighted average rating out of 100 to reviews from mainstream publications, this release received an average score of 85, based on 7 reviews.

In the review for Exclaim!, Adam Feibel wrote that the album was "probably the most Jeff Rosenstock of all Jeff Rosenstock records thus far. It's fun, loud and boisterous. It's packed to the brim but sounds so simple. It's sneakily cheeky and curiously charming." Writing for Pitchfork, Ian Cohen claimed that the album was "quintessential Jeff Rosenstock—an album formulated around evergreen sociopolitical concerns yet sounds like it could’ve been written 30 minutes ago." Talking the album in a review for Under the Radar, Caleb Campbell stated that "[Rosenstock] is just as self-effacing, funny, and principled as ever. He is still creating quality additions to one of the most consistent punk discographies out there. Most importantly, his music is still an absolute blast to experience, looking towards an uncertain future with a beautiful collective spirit."

Kyle Kohner was slightly more reserved when appraising the album for Beats Per Minute, claiming that "NO DREAM can be rather skin-deep when it comes to commentary on society-at-large, it’s a little more complex and tender when the record veers to Rosenstock himself as the subject. Through every desire to watch it all crash and burn into rubble, Rosenstock also throws in instances that are disarmingly human." Reviewing the album for AllMusic, Mark Deming called it a "passionate and kicks out the jams, not suggesting he wants to reinvent the wheel but that he knows how to get it to roll and pushes it fast and hard in the right direction."

=== Accolades ===
Accolades for No Dream
Publication	Accolade	Rank	Ref.
Pitchfork	The 35 Best Rock Albums of 2020	—	
Stereogum	Stereogum's 50 Best Albums of 2020 – Mid-Year	14	
The Ringer	The Best Albums of 2020	9	

== Track listing ==
No.	Title	Length
1.	"No Time"	0:54
2.	"Nikes (Alt)"	1:51
3.	"Scram!"	2:51
4.	"N O D R E A M"	3:50
5.	"State Line"	2:59
6.	"f a m e"	4:10
7.	"Leave It in the Sun"	2:31
8.	"The Beauty of Breathing"	2:57
9.	"Old Crap"	3:24
10.	"***BNB"	3:30
11.	"Monday at the Beach"	0:56
12.	"Honeymoon Ashtray"	4:28
13.	"Ohio Tpke"	5:48
Total length:		40:14

== Personnel ==
Death Rosenstock

- Dan Potthast – acoustic guitar, keyboards, vocals
- Jeff Rosenstock – lead vocals, guitars, keyboards, mixing, "n more"
- John DeDomenici – bass
- Mike Huguenor – guitars, vocals
- Kevin Higuchi – drums

Additional personnel

- Chris Farren – keyboards, vocals (tracks 8 and 12)
- Laura Stevenson – vocals (tracks 3, 6, 7, 8 and 12)
- Lauren Brief – vocals (track 4), backing vocals, claps
- Bob Vielma – trombone (tracks 6, 10 and 13)
- Gilbert Armendariz – backing vocals, claps
- Angelina Banda – backing vocals, claps
- Sim Castro – backing vocals, claps
- Laura Hammond – backing vocals, claps
- Neil Sharma – backing vocals, claps
- Jack Shirley – recording, engineering, production, mixing, mastering
- Ben Levin – illustrations
- Hiro Tanaka – photography

== Ska Dream ==
Ska Dream

Studio album by Jeff Rosenstock
- Released: April 20, 2021
- Recorded: 2021
- Genre: Ska punk; punk rock; ska
- Length: 39:30
- Label: Quote Unquote; Polyvinyl
- Producer: Jack "Metal Guy" Shirley

Jeff Rosenstock chronology
No Dream (2020)	Ska Dream (2021)	Hellmode (2023)

Professional ratings
Review scores
Source	Rating
The Needle Drop	8.0/10
Pitchfork	8.0/10

Ska Dream (stylized as S K A D R E A M) was announced through Twitter on April Fools' Day, 2021, and was released on April 20. Due to the lack of other promotion, many assumed the announcement was a joke.

Although the song titles are all altered to contain puns and references to ska culture, the lyrics are identical to the original album (with the exception of a rapped guest verse by Boboso on the third track and a few additional lines sung by Anika Pyle on the final track). Two tracks' new arrangements contain brief quotes from songs by other artists: the first track quotes "Our Time" by The Suicide Machines, the seventh quotes "Nite Klub" by The Specials.

Pitchfork's Brad Shoup wrote that, "for longtime fans of [ska], though, each 'hup' and 'pick it up' is truly affecting", and said the album had "ample artistic merit". Anthony Fantano of The Needle Drop ranked the album 10th in his top 50 albums of 2021, saying the songs of No Dream "sound even better as ska versions".

=== Track listing ===
No.	Title	Length
1.	"No Time to Skank"	1:27
2.	"Airwalks (Alt)"	1:42
3.	"SKrAm!"	2:39
4.	"S K A D R E A M"	3:11
5.	"Horn Line"	3:18
6.	"p i c k i t u p"	4:45
7.	"Leave It in the Ska"	2:33
8.	"The Rudie of Breathing"	3:05
9.	"Old SKrAp"	3:11
10.	"***SKA"	2:31
11.	"Monday at Back to the Beach"	1:14
12.	"Checkerboard Ashtray"	4:28
13.	"Ohio Porkpie"	6:01
Total length:		39:30

=== Personnel ===
Death Rosenstock

- John DeDomenici – bass
- Kevin Higuchi – drums, percussion
- Mike Huguenor – guitar
- Jer Hunter – trombone, trumpet
- David "Hooplah Jones" Rerhig - Saxophone, trumpet
- Rick Johnson – Hammond, Farfisa, Casio CZ101
- Christine Mackie – bells
- Dan Potthast – acoustic guitar, piano, vocals
- Jeff Rosenstock – vocals, guitar, tenor saxophone, baritone saxophone, Farfisa, Juno 106, Moog Prodigy, lyra, Wurlitzer, bells, Space Echo, artwork design
- Laura Stevenson – vocals

Additional Personnel

- Ara Babajian – additional cymbals (track 6)
- Sean Bonnette – vocals (track 13)
- Boboso – rapping (credited with "sick bars") (track 3)
- George Clarke – vocals (track 4)
- David Combs – vocals (track 3)
- Chris Farren – guitar, vocals (track 7)
- Augusta Koch – vocals (tracks 2 and 4)
- Angelo Moore – saxophone solo (track 6)
- Franz Nicolay – piano (credited with "luxurious piano") (track 6)
- nonregla – dub effects, production (credited with "additional cool dub shit") (track 5)
- Elise Okusami – vocals (tracks 3 and 7)
- Mike Park – tenor saxophone (track 8)
- PUP – vocals (tracks 10 and 13)
- Anika Pyle – vocals (tracks 2 and 13)
- Shannon Toombes – vocals (tracks 2, 7, and 9)
- Matt Embree – drum recording
- Ryan Perras – guitar recording for Mike Huguenor
- Jack Shirley – mixing, mastering
- Ben Levin – illustrations
