= Post- =

2018 studio album by Jeff Rosenstock

Studio album by Jeff Rosenstock
- Released: January 1, 2018
- Recorded: 2017
- Genres: Punk rock; indie rock; power pop
- Length: 40:06
- Labels: Quote Unquote; Polyvinyl; Specialist Subject
- Producer: Jack Shirley

Jeff Rosenstock chronology
Worry (2016)	Post- (2018)	No Dream (2020)

Post- (stylized in all caps) is the third solo studio album by American singer-songwriter Jeff Rosenstock, released on January 1, 2018, without any promotional lead-up. The album was released on Polyvinyl Record Co. in the United States and by Specialist Subject Records in the United Kingdom.

Much of Post- was written in the Catskill Mountains shortly after the 2016 presidential election. The resulting songs are, according The AV Club, "chiefly concerned with losing hope in your country, yourself, and those around you." The album was primarily recorded at Atomic Garden Studios in Palo Alto, California in late November and early December 2017; additional recording took place at the Quote Unquote Records offices in Brooklyn, New York and in East Durham, New York. Guests on the album include Rosenstock's bandmate in Antarctigo Vespucci, Chris Farren, as well as frequent collaborator Dan Potthast, American singer-songwriter Laura Stevenson, and Canadian punk rock band PUP.

Ten percent of proceeds from any digital sales made from the album are being donated to Defend Puerto Rico, a charity assisting with disaster relief in Puerto Rico.

== Track listing ==
No.	Title	Length
1.	"Mornin'!"	0:05
2.	"USA"	7:32
3.	"Yr Throat"	2:43
4.	"All This Useless Energy"	3:20
5.	"Powerlessness"	2:43
6.	"TV Stars"	4:20
7.	"Melba"	3:04
8.	"Beating My Head Against a Wall"	1:40
9.	"9/10"	3:29
10.	"Let Them Win"	11:10
11.	"Monkey Man 2" (hidden track)
Total length:		40:06

== Personnel ==
Death Rosenstock

- Jeff Rosenstock – lead vocals, guitars, keyboards, piano, percussion, layout, design, additional recording
- John DeDomenici – bass, backing vocals
- Mike Huguenor – guitars, backing vocals
- Kevin Higuchi – drums, percussion

Additional personnel

- Chris Farren – backing vocals (2, 6 and 10), additional recording
- Laura Stevenson – backing vocals (tracks 2, 6, 9 and 10), lead vocals (track 1), additional recording
- Dan Potthast – lap steel
- Nestor Chumak – Additional recording
- PUP – backing vocals, claps, additional recording
- Gilbert Armendariz – backing vocals, claps
- Angelina Banda – backing vocals, claps
- Sim Castro – backing vocals, claps
- Laura Hammond – backing vocals, claps
- Julia Loan – backing vocals, claps
- Neal Sharma – backing vocals, claps
- Shannon Toombs – backing vocals, claps
- Jack Shirley – recording, engineering, production, mixing, mastering
- Hiro Tanaka – photography

== Reception ==
Professional ratings
Aggregate scores
Source	Rating
AnyDecentMusic?	8.0/10
Metacritic	88/100
Review scores
Source	Rating
AllMusic	4/5 stars
The A.V. Club	A−
Chicago Tribune	3.5/4 stars
Drowned in Sound	8/10
Exclaim!	8/10
The Line of Best Fit	8/10
Paste	8.2/10
Pitchfork	8.2/10
PopMatters	8/10
The Skinny	5/5 stars

Post- was acclaimed by contemporary music critics upon its initial release. At Metacritic, which assigns a normalized rating out of 100 to reviews from mainstream publications, the album received an average score of 88, based on 11 reviews, indicating "universal acclaim".

Reviewing the album for AllMusic, writer Timothy Monger wrote: "While this may seem unerringly bleak, Post- is actually a pretty wild ride... Perhaps surprisingly so, Post- is also one of (Rosentock's) most accessible solo outings yet."

=== Accolades ===
The album was included in several end-of-the-year best-albums-of-2018 lists, ranking in such lists by BrooklynVegan (24th), Consequence of Sound (34th), Thrillist (35th), PopMatters (50th), Under the Radar (58th), and The Atlantic (1 of 23 unranked albums).

== Charts ==
Chart (2018)	Peak position
Heatseekers Albums (Billboard)	1
