= Frontera Women's Foundation =

Nonprofit organization

- Abbreviation: FWF
- Formation: 2003
- Type: Nonprofit
- Purpose: Women's organization
- Headquarters: El Paso, Texas
- Location: 501 North Kansas, Suite 203, El Paso, TX 79901
- Region served: U.S. Mexico border
- Official language: English, Spanish
- Website: FronteraWomensFoundation.org

Frontera Women's Foundation (FWF) is a nonprofit, nonpartisan organization operating in El Paso, Texas, United States, and Ciudad Juárez, Chihuahua, Mexico. Frontera Women's Foundation states its goal is "promoting positive social change for women and girls along the border" and focuses its campaign on community service and issues of women's rights at the family, community, and organizational level. The FWF supports grassroots organizations on the U.S.–Mexico border. The region extends from Southern New Mexico, through El Paso County, Texas, and Ciudad Juárez, Chihuahua, to Brownsville, Texas. The Frontera Women's Foundation supports these organizations by providing grants to groups that support women and girls struggling with issues such as low socio-economic status, gender bias, and ethnic bias.

== History ==
Established in 2003, Frontera Women's Foundation is one of the first women's funds in the state of Texas. The foundation was established to support organizations addressing the unique needs of women living on the border.

=== Origins ===
The founders of the Frontera Women's Foundation are women who live and work along the U.S. Mexico border. The Frontera Women's Foundation was established to address the scarcity of resources for community based non-profits in that particular area. The Foundation specifically focuses on organizations that support women and girls of the border region.

The FWF's gender focus acknowledges the fact that the border region faces national issues such as family violence, economic development and access to health care. Women and children comprise the majority of those living at the national poverty level. The FWF was formed to provide effective programs and strategies that specifically address the needs of this historically underserved population.

== Mission statement and purpose ==
Frontera Women's Foundation raises money to support the work of non-profit organizations that serve low-income women and girls. The Foundation aims "to promote social change, provide health care, ensure economic justice, end gender violence and encourage education and workforce development."

Money raised by the Foundation is gifted in the form of grants to organizations that support the mission statement. Some of the grant-making directly supports low-income communities on both sides of the Rio Grande borderline to encourage grassroots capacity building linked to sustainable development. In 2005 FWF completed its first round of grant-making and has awarded more than $160,000. The FWF supports a range of projects including direct services, counseling, support groups, education, self-esteem and personal development. The Foundation works with organizations that support the intellectual, cultural, social, and personal needs of women and girls.

== Affiliations and campaigns ==
=== Sexual assault prevention ===
With funding from the Frontera Women's Foundation, the Amistad Family Violence and Rape Crisis Center of Del Rio, Texas launched an educational campaign alerting girls to the dangers of date rape. The program also educated young men on what constitutes consensual sexual relations. The financial support from FWF helped to produce educational materials and training sessions.

=== Family literacy project ===
The FWF supports Brownsville Literacy Center of Brownsville, Texas, which encourages mothers of English language learners to participate in the academic community of their children. The funding from FWF supports weekly parenting classes and English language classes.

=== Victims of domestic violence ===
The Frontera Woman's Foundation supports the Center Against Family Violence (CAFV) in El Paso, Texas. With help from the Foundation, the CAFV provides a transitional living program for families as they become self-sufficient.

=== Women as peacemakers ===
The FWF supports Centro Mujeres de la ESperanza of El Paso, Texas. This organization serves single women with children with empowerment seminars and classes designed to enrich the self-esteem and self efficacy of underprivileged women. Funds from the FWF support courses such as Values and Life, Women as Peacemakers, and the Women's Spirituality Conference.

=== Family development center ===
With help from the Frontera Women's Foundation, the Chaparral Family Development Center in Chaparral, New Mexico provides support for self-employed women looking to earn extra income through craft-making. The group also raises awareness of racism and discrimination in the Chaparral area.

=== Counseling for teenage girls ===
Friendship of Women in Brownsville, Texas, is an organization which helps teenage girls who are the victims of abuse and domestic violence. With funding form the FWF, Friendship of Women in Brownsville is able to provide programs and counseling sessions.

=== Transitional employment program ===
In collaboration with Goodwill of El Paso, Texas, Frontera Women's Foundation promotes community health at local nonprofit clinics, and provide employment opportunities for underserved community members.

=== Start-Up and operations funds ===
Organizacion Enfoque of Socorro, Texas, is supported by funds from the Frontera Women's Foundation as well. As a general community resource, the Organization Enfoque provides English language courses, arts and crafts class, GED training, computer training, and citizenship classes for those in need.

=== Individual development accounts ===
The Frontera Women's Foundation collaborates with the YWCA of El Paso, Texas, to supply information on home ownership and support community members in need with transitional living.

=== Economic self-sufficiency program ===
The Women's Intercultural Center of Anthony, New Mexico, with the help of the Frontera Women's Foundation, provides community members with low income and low educational levels opportunities to become empowered and active in the community. The Intercultural center is a safehaven for women and girls, where they can develop life skills and high self-esteem.
