= Hellmode =

Studio album by Jeff Rosenstock
- Released: August 31, 2023
- Recorded: Summer 2022
- Studio: EastWest Studios, Hollywood, California; The Atomic Garden, East Oakland, California
- Genre: Punk rock
- Length: 41:03
- Label: Polyvinyl
- Producer: Jack Shirley

Jeff Rosenstock chronology
Ska Dream (2021)	Hellmode (2023)

Singles from Hellmode
- 1. "Liked U Better" Released: May 23, 2023; 2. "Doubt" Released: June 27, 2023; 3. "Healmode" Released: July 27, 2023

Hellmode (stylized in all caps) is the fifth (Note: Not including Ska Dream (2021).) solo studio album by American musician Jeff Rosenstock, released through Polyvinyl Record Co. on August 31, 2023. It has received positive reviews from critics.

== Writing and recording ==
Most of the songs on the album were fleshed out when Rosenstock spent a few days staying near Joshua Tree National Park; he went there to write after a tour was canceled due to COVID in early 2022.

Rosenstock recorded the album in summer 2022 with producer Jack Shirley. The album was primarily recorded at EastWest Studios in Hollywood, California, and the Atomic Garden in East Oakland.

On recording the album, Rosenstock said, "I had a day where I was just running shit from Hellmode through the fucking echo chambers that were used on Pet Sounds. That's huge for me! What a fucking dream. We had a parking spot in the back. It certainly energized me. I was like, 'How do we get this to sound like something from those major label punk records in the '90s—the ones that sounded good, the ones that sounded like the band went somewhere real and had somebody record it well and have that punch?' I don't know if the space necessarily made that so or anything, but it was cool to see all the names on the wall and feel like we were part of that continuum of music. We're a bunch of scrappy weirdos and we don't often feel like we're a part of it."

== Release ==
Hellmode was announced on June 27, 2023, with a release date of September 1. Along with the announcement, Rosenstock released the second single, "Doubt". "Doubt" also came with a music video made by members of the team behind the cartoon series Craig of the Creek, for which Rosenstock composes the score. Prior to the announcement, the lead single "Liked U Better" was released on May 23. The third single, "Healmode", was released on July 27, with a lyric video by Dan Potthast starring a snail named Champ.

The album was surprise-released a day early on August 31.

== Reception ==
Hellmode ratings
Aggregate scores
Source	Rating
Metacritic	84/100
Review scores
Source	Rating
AllMusic	4/5 stars
Clash	9/10
Exclaim!	8/10
The Line of Best Fit	8/10
Paste	7.5/10
Pitchfork	8.0/10

According to the review aggregator Metacritic, Hellmode received "universal acclaim" based on a weighted average score of 84 out of 100 from 6 critic scores. Exclaim!'s Adam Feibel called Hellmode "an album of fun, catchy punk anthems" which "hits all the right notes" that are "quintessential Rosenstock". Editors at Stereogum named Hellmode Album of the Week, with critic Patrick Hosken characterizing the album as "rife with climate anxiety, mental anguish, and tender acoustic moments" that has two halves of "amplified apprehension and a handful of songs based around the acoustic guitar". Pitchfork's Nina Corcoran called the album "the prettiest" Rosenstock has made, "but it still gets you riled up." AllMusic's Mark Deming claimed that "Rosenstock has a hard time being comfortable with happiness, and while it doubtless makes life stressful for him, it's great for his muse, and Hellmode is loaded with great songs."

=== Year-end lists ===
Hellmode on year-end lists
Publication	#	Ref.
Beats Per Minute	42	
Exclaim!	36	
The Needle Drop	1	
Our Culture Mag	40	
The Ringer	12	
Treble	48	

== Track listing ==
All tracks are written by Jeff Rosenstock. Song titles are stylized in all caps.

No.	Title	Length
1.	"Will U Still U"	3:21
2.	"Head"	1:31
3.	"Liked U Better"	2:50
4.	"Doubt"	4:28
5.	"Future Is Dumb"	3:48
6.	"Soft Living"	4:46
7.	"Healmode"	3:22
8.	"Life Admin"	2:43
9.	"I Wanna Be Wrong"	2:34
10.	"Graveyard Song"	4:31
11.	"3 Summers"	7:09
Total length:		41:03

== Personnel ==
=== Musicians ===
- Jeff Rosenstock – vocals, acoustic and electric guitars, saxophones, clarinet, organ, synthesizers, piano
- John DeDomenici – bass
- Kevin Higuchi – drums, percussion
- Mike Huguenor – electric guitar
- Dan Potthast – acoustic guitar, Wurlitzer electronic piano, vocals
- Chris Farren and Laura Stevenson – additional vocals
- Jeremy Hunter – trombone (1)
- Skylar Suorez – vibraphone (7)
- Christine Mackie – trash can (8)
- Gilbert Armendaríz, Lauren Brief, Sim Castro, Laura Hammond, PUP, and Neil Sharma – "International Vox & Clap Co. Class of 2022"

=== Technical ===
- Jack Shirley – producer, recording engineer, mixing engineer, mastering engineer
- Jeff Rosenstock – mixing engineer, photography, layout
- Logan Taylor – assistant engineer
- Dave Alegre – illustrations
- Hiro Tanaka – photography
- Rick Johnson – front of house engineer

=== Recording ===
- Recorded at EastWest Studios (Hollywood, California) and the Atomic Garden (East Oakland, California), with additional home recording by Jeff Rosenstock, Jeremy Hunter, and Skylar Suorez
- Pre-production at Balboa Studios (Los Angeles, California)

== Charts ==
Chart performance for Hellmode
Chart (2023)	Peak position
UK Album Downloads (OCC)	52

== See also ==
- List of 2023 albums
