= We Cool? =

Studio album by Jeff Rosenstock
- Released: March 3, 2015
- Genre: Punk rock, indie rock, power pop
- Length: 36:26
- Label: SideOneDummy Records
- Producer: Jack Shirley

Jeff Rosenstock chronology
I Look Like Shit (2012)	We Cool? (2015)	Worry (2016)

Singles from We Cool?
- 1. "Nausea" Released: January 29, 2015

Professional ratings
Review scores
Source	Rating
AllMusic	3.5/5 stars
Punknews.org	4/5 stars
The Music	3.5/5 stars
The Alternative	—

We Cool? is the debut solo studio album by Jeff Rosenstock. It was released by SideOneDummy Records on March 3, 2015.

The album crashed the SideOneDummy website upon its release. It debuted on the Billboard charts at #7 for Heatseekers Albums, #43 for Rock Albums, and #157 for Current Albums. It features guest appearances by Laura Stevenson, P.O.S, and members of Shinobu. Jeff Rosenstock toured the album with AJJ, Chumped, and The Smith Street Band.

== Track listing ==
No.	Title	Length
1.	"Get Old Forever"	3:20
2.	"You, In Weird Cities"	3:40
3.	"Novelty Sweater"	2:41
4.	"Nausea"	2:44
5.	"Beers Again Alone"	3:15
6.	"I'm Serious, I'm Sorry"	2:48
7.	"Hey Allison!"	1:52
8.	"Polar Bear Or Africa"	3:46
9.	"Hall of Fame"	2:19
10.	"All Blissed Out"	3:33
11.	"The Lows"	3:06
12.	"Darkness Records"	3:24
Total length:		36:26
