= Aivi & Surasshu =

Dutch-American music duo

aivi & surasshu
- Genres: Electronic; chiptune
- Years active: 2013–present
- Labels: Ubiktune, Materia Collective, Infloresce Records
- Members: Aivi Tran; Steven "surasshu" Velema
- Website: aivisura.com

Aivi & Surasshu (stylized as aivi & surasshu) are an electronic composition duo, composed of Vietnamese-American pianist and composer Aivi Tran and Dutch electronic musician Steven "surasshu" Velema. They are most known for composing soundtracks, including that of Cartoon Network's animated series Steven Universe. The duo began as a remote band and began working together in person after they married in 2015.

== Career ==
=== The Black Box (2013) ===
Aivi Tran and Steven Velema first interacted on Twitter in 2011 and met in person at GDC in San Francisco in 2012, where they discussed the idea of writing duets for piano and chiptune.

Communicating after the convention, the two collaborated remotely on an album project titled The Black Box, released by the netlabel Ubiktune in 2013. The project featured original duets for piano and chiptune, and covers of "Lonely Rolling Star" from Katamari Damacy, "Distance" by Asturias, and "Mabe Village" from The Legend of Zelda: Link's Awakening. The Black Box charted on Bandcamp's best-selling albums and was positively received, with Kotaku describing it as "lush, melodic, and well put-together".

=== Steven Universe (2013–2020) ===
Shortly after the release of The Black Box, storyboard artist Jeff Liu encountered Aivi's Soundcloud demos for the in-progress video game Cryamore. Jeff Liu suggested Aivi to Rebecca Sugar, who was currently developing the animated television series Steven Universe for Cartoon Network. Aivi asked surasshu to partner with them once again to compose the show's instrumental score. After discussing ideas with Rebecca Sugar and Ian Jones-Quartey, aivi & surasshu wound up representing each of the show's characters with a motivic instrument, allowing the show's instrumental score to be shaped by which characters were on screen. The character Pearl was accompanied by a piano, Garnet by a synth bass, Amethyst by electronic drums, and Steven with a mixture of chiptune, strings, and brass instruments. They worked with musicians from the video game scene to record instruments for the show's soundtrack, including guitarist Stemage. The duo also composed music for Steven Universe: The Movie and a sequel series, Steven Universe Future, alongside co-composer Jeff Ball.

aivi & surasshu collaborated with Rebecca Sugar to compose the end credits theme of Steven Universe, "Love Like You" and the end credits theme of Steven Universe Future, "Being Human". The first volume of the Steven Universe soundtrack reached #22 on the Billboard 200. A second volume followed in 2019, peaking at #28 on the Billboard 200, and #12 on the US iTunes chart.

=== Infloresce Records & Meanwhile (2022-Present) ===
In 2022, Aivi founded Infloresce Records. The label released their first compilation album Infloresce Vol.1 - Floral Folklore featuring music from artists such as Lena Raine, telebasher, and miles morkri. aivi & surasshu composed the track "Mai and the Snake" for the album based on the Vietnamese folktale, "The Legend of the Yellow Mai Flower". In addition to their track, surasshu mastered the album and Aivi served as album director.

On July 28, 2023, the duo released the 10th Anniversary Edition of The Black Box through Infloresce Records. It included 7 new tracks and had a limited run of vinyl, and was accompanied by a printed comic book illustrated by Diana Jakobsson.

In 2023, aivi & surasshu released their sophomore album, Meanwhile. Originally intended to be a sequel to The Black Box, the album shifted into a reflection of their life together since their debut album. The album was met with generally positive reviews, but received noticeably less attention than their previous work.

=== Other projects ===
The duo composed the soundtrack for the video game Ikenfell, as well as several interactive Google Doodles. They are currently composing the music for the video game Way to the Woods.
