= Nausea (Jeff Rosenstock song) =

Single by Jeff Rosenstock

from the album We Cool?
- Released: January 29, 2015
- Genre: Punk rock
- Length: 2:44
- Label: SideOneDummy; Quote Unquote
- Songwriter: Jeff Rosenstock
- Producer: Jack Shirley

Jeff Rosenstock singles chronology
"Summer" (2013)	"Nausea" (2015)	"Hey Allison!" (2015)

Music video
- "Nausea" on YouTube

"Nausea" is a song recorded by the American rock musician Jeff Rosenstock for his debut studio album, We Cool? (2015). It was released as the lead single from We Cool? on January 29, 2015 through SideOneDummy Records and Quote Unquote Records.

== Background ==
"Nausea" pre-dates its parent album, We Cool? by several years. Its genesis was spurred when Rosenstock's wife purchased him a Wurlitzer piano. He came up with the opening piano riff one day before a job interview, and was so inspired that it was all he could think of during the interview. At the time, Rosenstock was making ends meet as a truck driver in New York, and found time to compose the song when he could. He remembered the song's chorus, for example, came to him one day as he waited at a train station. Rosenstock debuted "Nausea" in demo form on his 2013 seven-inch Summer +. We Cool? was recorded in five days, with "Nausea" tracked live, and piano overdubs added later.

The song's lyrics detail a memory from a solo concert tour Rosenstock undertook. On a day off in Wisconsin, he decided to buy wine, rent a hotel room with a hot tub, and have a party to himself. The next day, he awoke to a voicemail from a friend informing him that one of their mutual friends, Mitchell Dubey, was killed in an apartment break-in. In the song, Rosenstock croons, "I got so tired of discussing my future / I’ve started avoiding the people I love." In an interview with Chris DeMakes, Rosenstock revealed the song details his regret in not spending more time with Dubey. He described the song's theme as "having taken time with somebody for granted because your judgment is too clouded by self-doubt to open up and talk to somebody." The song's bridge was meant to evoke producer Phil Spector and mid-twentieth century rock.

The music video debuted January 29, 2015. Rosenstock is depicted as getting stabbed to death at one of his concerts.

== Release and reception ==
Rosenstock performed the song on NBC's Last Call with Carson Daly in 2016.

Timothy Monger at AllMusic wrote that "'Nausea' sports a nearly wistful, B-level Ben Folds-ian piano melody over which Rosenstock's overblown, hoarse voice bellows tales of disillusionment while heavy ska horns play from the wings."

== Personnel ==
Credits adapted from the liner notes for We Cool?

- John DeDomenici – bass, drums
- Kevin Higuchi – drums, tambourine
- Mike Huguenor – guitar, vocals
- Jeff Rosenstock – vocals, guitar, keyboards, songwriting, recording, layout
- Bob Vielma – trombone
- Laura Stevenson – vocals
- Scott Dektar – group vocals
- Jack Shirley – production, recording, mixing, mastering engineer
