= Joren Cull =

Canadian illustrator and author

- Born: Toronto, Ontario, Canada
- Website: www.jorenmania.com

Joren Cull is a Canadian illustrator, animator, and author from Toronto.

== Publications ==
=== As author and illustrator ===
- I Am Book. Penguin Workshop. 2024. ISBN 9780593659250.

=== As illustrator ===
- Sauer, Tammi (2022). The Underpants. Scholastic Press. ISBN 9781338740271.
