= Requiem (Bracket album) =

Studio album by Bracket
- Released: February 7, 2006
- Genre: Punk rock, power pop, pop punk, indie folk, baroque pop
- Length: 50:19
- Label: Takeover
- Producer: Marty Gregori, Angelo Celli

Bracket chronology
Live in a Dive (2002)	Requiem (2006)

Professional ratings
Review scores
Source	Rating
Allmusic	link
eMusic	link
Punknews.org	link
Punktastic	link
Sputnik Music	link

Requiem is the sixth album by Californian punk rock band Bracket, released on February 7, 2006 on Takeover Records. The album marks the longest break between the band's studio albums, with over five years separating Requiem and its predecessor, When All Else Fails.

Bracket recorded the album over the course of two years at Trailer Park Studios which was built by drummer Ray Castro, with the help of the other band members, inside an abandoned trailer.^{[1]} Requiem would be the first album produced entirely by the band, with vocalist/guitarist Marty Gregori and guitarist Angelo Celli picking up all engineering, production and mixing credits.

Requiem consists of "Warren's Song, Pt. 10" through "Warren's Song, Pt. 26"; however, the tracks don't appear in succession. Despite the similar song titles, the release has been described as the most musically diverse Bracket album to date.^{[2]} In addition to the pop punk sound the band has become known for, the album features a wide range of instrumentation including acoustic elements and string arrangements, as well as expansive vocal harmonies reminiscent of The Beach Boys scattered throughout.^{[2]}

== Track listing ==
All songs written and composed by Bracket.

1. "Warren's Song, Pt. 16" – 2:15
2. "Warren's Song, Pt. 19" – 2:56
3. "Warren's Song, Pt. 14" – 2:08
4. "Warren's Song, Pt. 24" – 1:46
5. "Warren's Song, Pt. 11" – 3:20
6. "Warren's Song, Pt. 23" – 3:16
7. "Warren's Song, Pt. 17" – 2:36
8. "Warren's Song, Pt. 26" – 3:44
9. "Warren's Song, Pt. 18" – 3:07
10. "Warren's Song, Pt. 12" – 3:46
11. "Warren's Song, Pt. 21" – 3:02
12. "Warren's Song, Pt. 20" – 2:20
13. "Warren's Song, Pt. 10" – 3:52
14. "Warren's Song, Pt. 25" – 2:06
15. "Warren's Song, Pt. 15" – 3:01
16. "Warren's Song, Pt. 22" – 2:57
17. "Warren's Song, Pt. 13" – 3:59

== History of Warren's Song ==
In 1994, Bracket began releasing songs titled after Warren Rake, a friend of the band whose childhood artwork appeared in the liner notes of 924 Forestville St., their debut album which also included the first installment of tracks the band titled after him. Since then, Bracket has continued to issue albums and EPs that usually included at least one "Warren's Song", each with its own individual number.

Year	Song title	Release	Label
1994	"Warren's Song, Pt. 1"	924 Forestville St.	Caroline Records
1994	"Warren's Song, Pt. 2"	924 Forestville St.	Caroline Records
1994	"Warren's Song, Pt. 3"	Stinky Fingers	Fat Wreck Chords
1995	"Warren's Song, Pt. 4"	4-Wheel Vibe	Caroline Records
1996	"Warren's Song, Pt. 5"	4 Rare Vibes	Caroline Records
1996	"Warren's Song, Pt. 6"	Like You Know	Caroline Records
1996	"Warren's Song, Pt. 7"	Novelty Forever	Fat Wreck Chords
1999	"Warren's Song, Pt. 8"	Short Music for Short People	Fat Wreck Chords
2000	"Warren's Song, Pt. 9"	When All Else Fails	Fat Wreck Chords
2006	"Warren's Song, Pt. 10" - "Warren's Song, Pt. 26"	Requiem	Takeover Records
2014	"Warren's Song, Pt. 27"	Hold Your Applause	High Output Records
2016	"Warren's Song, Pt. 28"	The Last Page	Head 2 Wall Records
2019	"Warren's Song, Pt. 29"	Too Old To Die Young	Fat Wreck Chords

== Personnel ==
- Marty Gregori – vocals, guitar, engineer, producer, mixer
- Angelo Celli – guitar, vocals, engineer, producer, mixer
- Zack Charlos – bass, vocals
- Ray Castro – drums, studio construction
- George Chavez – cello on "Warren's Song, Pt. 13"
- Calvin Keaoola – violins on "Warren's Song, Pt. 13"
- Sienna S'Zell – viola on "Warren's Song, Pt. 13"
