= Pursuance =

Studio album by Only Crime
- Released: May 13, 2014
- Recorded: Blasting Room, Fort Collins, Colorado, U.S.
- Genre: Melodic hardcore
- Length: 28:19
- Label: Rise Records
- Producer: Only Crime

Only Crime chronology
Virulence (2007)	Pursuance (2014)

Professional ratings
Review scores
Source	Rating
Punknews	4.5/5 stars

Pursuance is the third full-length studio album from melodic hardcore band, Only Crime. The album was released on May 13, 2014 and is the band's first studio album to feature bassist Dan Kelly, formerly a member of the punk rock band The Frisk and guitarist Matt Hoffman, formerly of the punk band Modern Life is War. Pursuance is the band's first album to be released on Rise Records, having the previous two studio albums released on Fat Wreck Chords. The album was produced by Bill Stevenson and was recorded at Stevenson's own recording studio The Blasting Room in Fort Collins, Colorado.

== Critical reception ==
Pursuance received positive reviews from critics, with the website Dying Scene praising the album for its more melodic sound it showcases compared to the previous studio albums, but still with plenty of anger. Dying Scene also stated in the review that with the band's first two albums being more focused on hardcore punk, this album was "both a natural progression and a bit of a departure". The review also mentioned the album's "bitter lyrics collide with almost metal guitar riffs" and that the "discordant riffs tie the album together in a very satisfyingly pissed off package".

Richard Cocksedge of Punknews wrote "Where To The Nines failed to ignite my passion, Pursuance is full of fire and brimstone, bringing to the fore the qualities that you would expect from the five members of the band. I still don't like the term 'supergroup' but Only Crime have shown that the bringing together of a variety of people, skilled at their chosen field, can bear fruit. Pursuance is an album lacking filler and sets a high standard for melodic hardcore with its invigorating suite of songs."

== Track listing ==
All music written by Only Crime, all lyrics by Russ Rankin

1. "We Are Divided" – 2:24
2. "Contagious" – 2:28
3. "In Blood" – 2:20
4. "One Last Breath" – 2:21
5. "Drowning" – 2:21
6. "Absolution" – 3:01
7. "No Truth In Love" – 1:57
8. "Find Yourself Alone" – 1:58
9. "Life Was Fair" – 2:46
10. "See It Die" – 1:55
11. "Emptiness And Lies" – 1:53
12. "Bred To Fail" – 2:55

== Personnel ==
- Russ Rankin – vocals
- Zach Blair – guitar
- Matt Hoffman – guitar
- Dan Kelly – bass
- Bill Stevenson – drums

== Production ==
- Recorded at the Blasting Room, Fort Collins, Colorado, U.S.
- Produced by Only Crime
- Mixed by Chris Beeble
- Engineered by Jason Livermore, Andrew Berlin, and Bill Stevenson
