= Rock Against Bush =

Compilation album series

Rock Against Bush was a project mobilizing punk and alternative musicians against the 2004 U.S. Presidential re-election campaign of George W. Bush. At its core was the idea of using music to create an anti-war, pro-peace sentiment, similar to counterculture music movements of the 1960s and 1970s, such as Woodstock. The effort inspired Australian punk bands to start Rock Against Howard.

The effort was initiated by Fat Mike (Michael Burkett) of the band NOFX and punk music label Fat Wreck Chords, inspired by the Rock Against Reagan campaign of the early 1980s. It included live concerts, a series of compilation albums, and is associated with the Punkvoter website. Its goal was to encourage people, especially punk fans, to register to vote and to oppose Bush. The album proceeds were used to support a 2004 concert tour and an associated voter registration drive, emphasizing the swing states. The effort did not achieve its goal, as George W. Bush went on to win the election. The albums have been issued by the Fat Wreck Chords label, which focuses on skate punk and pop punk artists, so most of the songs are by similar themed bands. Both a CD and a DVD were included, the latter containing documentaries critical of Bush, music videos, and comedy.

== Performers ==
- Against Me!
- Alkaline Trio
- Anti-Flag
- Authority Zero
- Autopilot Off
- Bad Religion
- D.O.A.
- Denali
- Descendents
- Dillinger Four
- Donots
- Dropkick Murphys
- Dwarves
- Flogging Molly
- Foo Fighters
- Green Day
- Hot Water Music
- Jawbreaker
- Jello Biafra
- Lagwagon
- Less Than Jake
- Mad Caddies
- Ministry
- NOFX
- New Found Glory
- No Doubt
- No Use for a Name
- Only Crime
- Operation Ivy
- Pennywise
- Rancid
- Rise Against
- Rx Bandits
- Sick of It All
- Sleater-Kinney
- Social Distortion
- Strike Anywhere
- Strung Out
- Sugarcult
- Sum 41
- The (International) Noise Conspiracy
- The A.K.A.s
- The Ataris
- The Bouncing Souls
- The Epoxies
- The Frisk
- The Get Up Kids
- The Lawrence Arms
- The Matches
- The Offspring
- The Soviettes
- The Unseen
- The World/Inferno Friendship Society
- Thought Riot
- Useless ID
- Yellowcard

== Reception and criticism ==
Green Day drummer Tré Cool has said Rock Against Bush is "a pretty damn good CD" and that there are "some older bands on there that are still going strong and some younger bands that are real fresh and exciting too.".

Rock Against Bush and Punkvoter were subject to criticism on multiple fronts. A similar (but more obscure) project was started by conservative punks called "Crush Kerry". In addition, more radical punks (especially anarchists) criticized the emphasis on electoral politics, as well as the tacit endorsement of John Kerry, who they believed was not much better than George W. Bush. The band Propagandhi decided not to participate when Fat Mike requested that they change the lyrics of a song critical of George Soros that they wished to contribute.

== Discography ==
Title	Date
Rock Against Bush, Vol. 1	April 20, 2004
Rock Against Bush, Vol. 2	August 10, 2004
