= Live in a Dive (Bracket album) =

Live album by Bracket
- Released: February 26, 2002
- Recorded: August 14, 1999; Bottom of the Hill, San Francisco, California, United States
- Genre: Punk rock, power pop, pop punk
- Length: 50:52
- Label: Fat Wreck Chords
- Producer: Ryan Greene

Bracket chronology
When All Else Fails (2000)	Live in a Dive (2002)	Requiem (2006)

Live in a Dive chronology
No Use for a Name (2001)	Bracket (2002)	Sick of It All (2002)

Professional ratings
Review scores
Source	Rating
Allmusic	link
Punknews.org	link

Live in a Dive is a live album by Californian punk rock band Bracket, released on Fat Wreck Chords as the second installment of the labels Live in a Dive series on February 26, 2002. The performance was recorded on August 14, 1999 when the band appeared in support of Tilt at Bottom of the Hill in San Francisco, California.

The set included material from all of Brackets' previous albums, as well as songs from E is for Everything on Fat Wreck Chords. Several tracks are different from their studio version counterpart. "Warren's Song, Pt. 8" (which appeared on Short Music for Short People) features a lengthy musical introduction, while "2RAK005" is played at mid-tempo pace compared to its original version. The song "2RAK005" is featured on the soundtrack to Tony Hawk's Underground. The studio version of "Hearing Aid" can be found on Live Fat, Die Young. "Parade" had not yet been released at the time of the performance but would see release the following year on When All Else Fails.

== Track listing ==
All songs written and composed by Bracket.

1. "Trailer Park" – 3:14
2. "Green Apples" – 2:11
3. "Hearing Aid" – 3:19
4. "Warren's Song, Pt. 8" – 1:44
5. "Huge Balloon" – 2:33
6. "Talk Show" – 3:45
7. "Warren's Song, Pt. 2" – 2:47
8. "Hermit" – 4:36
9. "Happy to Be Sad" – 2:00
10. "Circus Act" – 4:29
11. "Back to Allentown" – 3:12
12. "J. Weed" – 3:11
13. "Sour" – 2:32
14. "Lazy" – 3:34
15. "Parade" – 2:16
16. "2RAK005" – 2:35
17. "Rod's Post" – 2:54

== Personnel ==
- Marty Gregori – vocals, guitar
- Angelo Celli – guitar, vocals
- Zack Charlos – bass, vocals
- Ray Castro – drums
- Ryan Greene – producer
- Adam Krammer – engineer
- Winni Hines – photography
- Rick Hines – photography
- John Estes – cover art, comic book art
- Kevin Cross – cover art, comic book art
- Rick Remender – cover art
