= List of Fat Wreck Chords compilation albums =

An overview of the Fat Wreck Chords compilations:

1. Fat Music for Fat People – (1994)
2. Survival of the Fattest – (1996)
3. Physical Fatness- (1997)
4. Life in the Fat Lane – (1999)
5. Short Music for Short People – (1999)
6. Live Fat, Die Young- (2001)
7. Uncontrollable Fatulence – (2002)
8. Liberation: Songs to Benefit PETA – (2003)
9. Rock Against Bush, Vol. 1 – (2004)
10. Rock Against Bush, Vol. 2 -(2004)
11. PROTECT: A Benefit for the National Association to Protect Children – (2005)
12. Wrecktrospective – (2009)
13. Harder, Fatter + Louder! – (2010)
14. Going Nowhere Fat – (2015)
15. Mild in the Streets: Fat Music Unplugged (2016)
16. Free Coaster (2018)

== Floyd promos ==
Free samplers that were given out. Most album titles and covers are parodies of well-known punk albums.

- If Life Is A Bowl Of Cherries...Why Is Floyd Always In The Pit? (1999)
- More RPM's Than Floyd on a Scooter (2000)
- Floyd... And Out Come the Teeth (2001)
  - Parody of ...And Out Come the Wolves (1995) by Rancid
- The Thing That Floyd Ate (2001)
  - Parody of The Thing That Ate Floyd (Lookout! Records compilation)
- Floyd: Squawk Among Us (2002)
  - Parody of Walk Among Us (1982) by The Misfits
- The Exfloyded (2003)
  - Parody of On Stage by The Exploited
- Anti-Floyd – The Terrier State (2004)
  - Parody of The Terror State (2003) by Anti-Flag
- Rock Against Floyd (2005)
  - Parody of Fat Wrecks' own Rock Against Bush, Vol. 1 compilation
- Land Of The Rising Floyd (2007)

== Digital samplers ==
Starting in 2006, Fat Wreck moved to distribute their annual free compilations online.

- iFloyd (2006)
  - A take-off of iTunes, as it was only released digitally via their website
- X-Mas Bonus (2006)
  - Fat Wreck's second digital sampler, available on their website, with corresponding podcast episode
- Hanuk-COMP: From the Dreidel to the Grave (2007)
  - Fat Wreck's third digital sampler, and second to come out fodr the holidays, with corresponding podcast episode
