= Rock Against Bush, Vol. 1 =

Compilation album by Fat Wreck Chords
- Released: April 20, 2004
- Recorded: Various
- Genre: Punk rock
- Length: 70:51
- Label: Fat Wreck Chords
- Producer: Various

Fat Wreck Chords chronology
Liberation: Songs to Benefit PETA (2003)	Rock Against Bush, Vol. 1 (2004)	Rock Against Bush, Vol. 2 (2004)

Professional ratings
Review scores
Source	Rating
AllMusic	4/5 stars

Rock Against Bush, Vol. 1 is a Rock Against Bush compilation album released on the Fat Wreck Chords record label. It contains a collection of songs, both released and unreleased, by various punk rock artists and includes a bonus DVD with political facts, commentary regarding the 2004 U.S. presidential election, footage from a David Cross stand-up comedy performance, as well as a few music videos. It was released on April 20, 2004.

== Track listing ==
1. "Nothing to Do When You're Locked in a Vacancy" – None More Black – 2:07 *
2. "Moron" (Demo) – Sum 41 – 1:39 *
3. "Warbrain" – Alkaline Trio – 2:27 *
4. "Need More Time" – Epoxies – 2:29
5. "The School of Assassins" – Anti-Flag – 2:37 *
6. "Sink, Florida, Sink" (Electric) – Against Me! – 2:10 *
7. "Baghdad" – The Offspring – 3:18 *
8. "Lion and the Lamb" – The Get Up Kids – 3:22 *
9. "Give It All" – Rise Against – 2:49 *
10. "No W" – Ministry – 3:13 *
11. "Sad State of Affairs" – Descendents – 2:35 *
12. "Revolution" – Authority Zero – 2:23 *
13. "¡Paranoia! Cha-Cha-Cha" – The Soviettes – 2:04 *
14. "That's Progress" – Jello Biafra with D.O.A. – 3:14
15. "Overcome (The Recapitulation)" – Rx Bandits – 3:43
16. "No Voice of Mine" – Strung Out – 2:30 *
17. "To the World" – Strike Anywhere – 3:21
18. "Heaven Is Falling" (Bad Religion Cover) – The Ataris – 2:38 *
19. "God Save the USA" – Pennywise – 3:06
20. "Normal Days" – Denali – 3:25
21. "The Expatriate Act" – The World/Inferno Friendship Society – 3:02 *
22. "No News Is Good News" – New Found Glory – 2:58 *
23. "Basket of Snakes" – The Frisk – 2:31 *
24. "Jaw, Knee, Music" – NOFX – 2:31 *
25. "It's the Law" – Social Distortion – 2:35
26. "The Brightest Bulb Has Burned Out" – Less Than Jake featuring Billy Bragg – 4:52*

* previously unreleased/rare tracks

== Original appearances ==
The previously released tracks are listed below with the albums on which they originally appeared:

- "Need More Time" – track 1 on Epoxies' self-titled album
- "Sink, Florida, Sink" – alternate version appeared as track 4 on Against Me!'s As the Eternal Cowboy
- "That's Progress" – track 1 on Jello Biafra and D.O.A.'s Last Scream of the Missing Neighbors collaboration
- "Overcome (The Recapitulation)" – track 4 on Rx Bandits' The Resignation
- "To the World" – track 4 on Strike Anywhere's Exit English
- "God Save the USA" – track 2 on Pennywise's From the Ashes
- "Normal Days" – track 8 on Denali's The Instinct
- "It's the Law" – track 1 on Social Distortion's Prison Bound
- "Revolution" – track 2 on Authority Zero's Andiamo
- "Baghdad" – track 3 on The Offspring's Baghdad
- "Give It All" – later appeared as track 9 on Rise Against's Siren Song of the Counter Culture (Although a different version appears on the album)
- "No News Is Good News" – later appeared as track 13 on New Found Glory's Catalyst
- "Jaw, Knee, Music" – later appeared as track 13 on NOFX's The Longest EP
- "The Brightest Bulb Has Burned Out" – track 13 on Anthem from Less than Jake minus Bragg

== See also ==
- Fat Wreck Chords compilations
- Rock Against Bush, Vol. 2
