= Rock Against Bush, Vol. 2 =

Compilation album by Fat Wreck Chords
- Released: August 10, 2004
- Recorded: Various
- Genre: Punk rock
- Length: 73:09
- Label: Fat Wreck Chords
- Producer: Gavin MacKillop and Rick Rubin

Fat Wreck Chords chronology
Rock Against Bush, Vol. 1 (2004)	Rock Against Bush, Vol. 2 (2004)	PROTECT: A Benefit for the National Association to Protect Children (2005)

Professional ratings
Review scores
Source	Rating
AllMusic	3.5/5 stars

Rock Against Bush, Vol. 2 is the second Rock Against Bush compilation album released on the Fat Wreck Chords record label. It contains a collection of songs by various punk rock artists, some of which were previously unreleased. It also includes a bonus DVD with political facts, commentary regarding the 2004 U.S. presidential election, comedy footage, and music videos. It was released on August 10, 2004.

== Track listing ==
1. "Favorite Son" – Green Day – 2:13 *
2. "Let Them Eat War" – Bad Religion – 2:58
3. "Unity" – Operation Ivy – 2:14
4. "Necrotism: Decanting the Insalubrious (Cyborg Midnight) Part 7" – The Lawrence Arms – 1:48 *
5. "We Got the Power" – Dropkick Murphys – 2:45 *
6. "Drunken Lullabies" – Flogging Molly – 3:49
7. "Doomsday Breach" – Only Crime – 2:15
8. "Gas Chamber" (Angry Samoans cover) – Foo Fighters – 0:55 *
9. "Status Pools" – Lagwagon – 2:36 *
10. "What You Say" – Sugarcult – 2:36
11. "7 Years Down" – Rancid – 2:33
12. "Off with Your Head" – Sleater-Kinney – 2:26 *
13. "Scream Out" – The Unseen – 2:48 *
14. "Violins" (Lagwagon cover) – Yellowcard – 3:33 *
15. "Like Sprewells on a Wheelchair" – Dillinger Four – 3:41 *
16. "Chesterfield King" (Live) – Jawbreaker – 4:03 *
17. "Born Free" (Live) – The Bouncing Souls – 1:45 *
18. "No Hope" (Live) – Mad Caddies – 1:41 *
19. "Kids Today" (Feat. The Matches & The A.K.A.s) – Dwarves – 1:25 *
20. "Can't Wait to Quit" – Sick of It All – 2:09 *
21. "Comforting Lie" – No Doubt – 2:52
22. "State of Fear" – Useless ID – 3:12 *
23. "I'm Thinking" – Autopilot Off – 2:50 *
24. "My Star" – The (International) Noise Conspiracy – 2:35 *
25. "Time's Up" – Donots – 3:24 *
26. "Kill the Night" – Hot Water Music – 2:42 *
27. "You're Gonna Die" – Thought Riot – 2:36
28. "Fields of Agony" (Acoustic) – No Use for a Name – 2:45 *

* Previously unreleased / rare

== Original appearances ==
The previously released tracks are listed below with the albums on which they originally appeared:

- "Let Them Eat War" from the album The Empire Strikes First
- "Drunken Lullabies" from the Flogging Molly album of the same name
- "Doomsday Breach" from the album To the Nines
- "What You Say" from the album Palm Trees and Power Lines
- "7 Years Down" from the album Let's Go
- "Comforting Lie" from the album Return of Saturn
- "You're Gonna Die" from the album Sketches of Undying Will
- "Unity" from the album Energy

== Political shorts ==
- "Independent Media in a Time of War" – Producer: Hudson Mohawk Independent Media Center, Narrator: Amy Goodman

"Part scathing critique, part call to action, 'Independent Media In A Time Of War', argues that dialogue is vital to a healthy democracy."

- "Honor Betrayed" – Director: Stuart Sugg, Executive Producer: Mike Lux

"The 10-minute documentary exposes the hypocrisy of the Bush administration's relationship with the U.S. military."

- "Fixed in Florida"
- "Bush Family Fortunes" – Director: Jonathan Levin, Executive Producer: Matthew Pascarella
- "Uncovered: The Whole Truth About the Iraq War" – Directed and Produced by Robert Greenwald
- "Unprecedented: The 2000 Presidential Election"

"The 2000 Presidential election is the riveting story of the battle for the Presidency in Florida and the undermining of democracy in America."

- "Unconstitutional"

"Unconstitutional is an hour-long documentary detailing the shocking way that civil liberties of American citizens have been infringed upon, curtailed, and rolled back since 9/11 – all in the name of national security."

== Music videos ==
- "We've Had Enough" – Alkaline Trio
- "Los Angeles Is Burning" – Bad Religion
- "Drunken Lullabies" – Flogging Molly
- "Idiot Son of an Arsehole" – NOFX
- "With Love, the Underground" – Thought Riot

== Comedy ==
- "Straight Talk", Will Ferrell
- Greg Proops (footage from "Peter Cook: A Posthumous Tribute")
- "Patton Oswalt vs. Bush"

== See also ==
- Fat Wreck Chords compilations
- Rock Against Bush, Vol. 1
