= Hagfish (band) =

American rock band

- Hagfish performing in 2006

Background information
- Origin: Dallas, Texas, U.S.
- Genres: Punk rock, alternative rock, pop punk, melodic hardcore
- Years active: 1991–2001 (reunions: 2003–2004, 2006, 2010, 2012, 2014, 2015, 2016, 2017, 2018, 2019)
- Labels: Idol, Dragon Street, BYO, London, Go-Kart, Honest Don's, Coldfront
- Members: George Stroud Reagan III; Zach Blair; Doni Blair; Tony Barsotti

Hagfish were an American rock band originated in Sherman, Texas that rose to notoriety via performances in the Deep Ellum district of Dallas, Texas, drawing influences from both punk rock and alternative rock. The lineup included lead vocalist George Stroud Reagan III, guitarist Zach Blair, bassist Doni Blair and drummer Tony Barsotti for the majority of the band's career, including nearly all of their recorded work. Formed by the Blair brothers in 1991, Hagfish emerged with contemporaries Tripping Daisy and Toadies as part of the 1990s Dallas/Fort Worth alternative rock scene and were also heavily influenced by the Descendents/All, whose members recorded and produced two of the band's studio albums. After officially disbanding in 2001, Hagfish have reunited occasionally for live performances.

== History ==
=== Formation, early years and Buick Men (1991–1994) ===
Hagfish was formed in Dallas, Texas when brothers, guitarist Zach Blair and bassist Doni Blair met drummer Banning Lyon after his band Conniption Fit broke up in the early 1990s. Their collective chemistry led the trio to pursue frontman James Newhouse, formerly of the band Terminal Rot, who would fill the position.^{[1]} During this time period, Hagfish began performing locally, opening for such bands as All, Swervedriver and Poster Children. A demo tape was released following the contrasting sensibility of punk band the Descendents, with tracks like "Tallman", about the middle finger and "Maybe", a love song composed by Lyon.

Tensions between Lyon and the Blair brothers culminated in Lyon leaving the band and John Frum took over on drums, bringing with him guitarist Mike Brown to fill in the sound.^{[1]} This lineup pushed the quintet into new territory, and although popular with fans, the band was collapsing due to internal conflict. Newhouse was fired from the group and later died in a car accident in October 1994.^{[1]} The Blair brothers severed ties with Frum and Brown after an attempted recording project, bringing with them the Hagfish moniker. The pair briefly reunited with Lyon and began searching for a singer, finding George Stroud Reagan III during a rehearsal at Musician's Exchange in Dallas.

After Lyon departed for the second time, drummer Scott Carter joined Hagfish in 1993, who along with the Blair brothers and Reagan, began work on Buick Men, the group's debut studio album. During the recording sessions Carter was replaced with drummer Tony Barsotti, the last lineup change to occur within the band for what would prove to be a near decade run together. The album was released later that year on Dragon Street Records, who had issued the debut album by local companions Tripping Daisy, the previous year. Buick Men was followed up with a four-song 7" vinyl EP on BYO Records in 1994.

=== Rocks Your Lame Ass and touring (1995–1997) ===
With a permanent lineup in place, Hagfish signed to London Records and entered The Blasting Room in Fort Collins, Colorado to record their next album with producers Bill Stevenson and Stephen Egerton (members of the Descendents and All), who also engineered and mixed the sessions. In addition to six brand new tracks, many songs from Buick Men were re-recorded with much sleeker production to create the album Rocks Your Lame Ass, released June 27, 1995.

To promote the release, Hagfish embarked on their first major tour with Bad Brains. Immediately following the release of Rocks Your Lame Ass, a long year of constant touring ensued supporting the likes of Bad Brains, ALL, ZEKE, Everclear, NOFX, The Mighty Mighty Bosstones, The Offspring, Face to Face, Die Artze, The Reverend Horton Heat and the Supersuckers. The band made an infamous appearance on KROQ's Loveline on August 16, 1995, after the suggestion of host Riki Rachtman.^{[2]} Rocks Your Lame Ass would go on to become the most successful Hagfish release, with singles for "Stamp" and "Happiness" both issued along with accompanying music videos that appeared on MTV's 120 Minutes. In 1996, Hagfish was voted best Alternative Rock/Pop act by the Dallas Observer.^{[3]}

However, the momentum never translated into album sales and after numerous arguments with the band's label, the follow-up album was rejected by London Records, who subsequently dropped the group. "Unidentified" would be the only song from these sessions to transpire when it was made available as a free download on the band's official website.^{[4]} The album would eventually be reworked, re-recorded and released independently. In 1997, Hagfish issued their second 7" vinyl EP, this time on Go-Kart Records.

=== Hagfish, Coldfront releases and breakup (1998–2001) ===
Following a long delay with their former record label, Hagfish returned to The Blasting Room with Stevenson and Egerton, who reprised their roles as producers to record the band's third album. This recording attempt proved successful and the self-titled Hagfish saw release on March 24, 1998. The album was issued through Honest Don's Records, a subsidiary label of Fat Wreck Chords. Two songs featured on Hagfish previously appeared as b-sides to the "Happiness" single, which included an early version of "18 Days" (originally titled "New Year's Song") and a live version of "Twisting", a They Might Be Giants cover. The band again toured in support of the release.

Hagfish released the live album Caught Live on March 2, 1999, produced by the Blair brothers and the first of three releases for Coldfront Records. The performance was captured in October 1998 at Trees in Dallas and included material from both Rocks Your Lame Ass and Hagfish, as well as the non-album tracks "Grin Doggy" and "Moaner". In 2000, the band released a limited edition interview disc with their Loveline appearance from 1995, originally available as the final track of the "Happiness" single. The compilation album, That Was Then, This Is Then saw release in 2001, including b-sides, previously unreleased material and compilation tracks. That same year the band's touring stopped and several breakups soon followed.

== Reunions and post breakup ==
Since the official breakup in 2001, the band members would go on to other projects, as well as participating together in sporadic reunions. On April 18, 2003, Hagfish reunited and performed at the Gypsy Tea Room in their hometown of Dallas. With the inclusion of three new songs in the set, the group announced plans to release a fourth studio album in late 2003 or early 2004.^{[4]} The following month they toured with Lagwagon and continued to play locally throughout the year, making an appearance at the Buzz-Oven Festival. However, the official website last updated on March 7, 2004, would fall dormant and to date, no new Hagfish album has surfaced. On June 18, 2006, the band reunited for another performance at the Gypsy Tea Room.

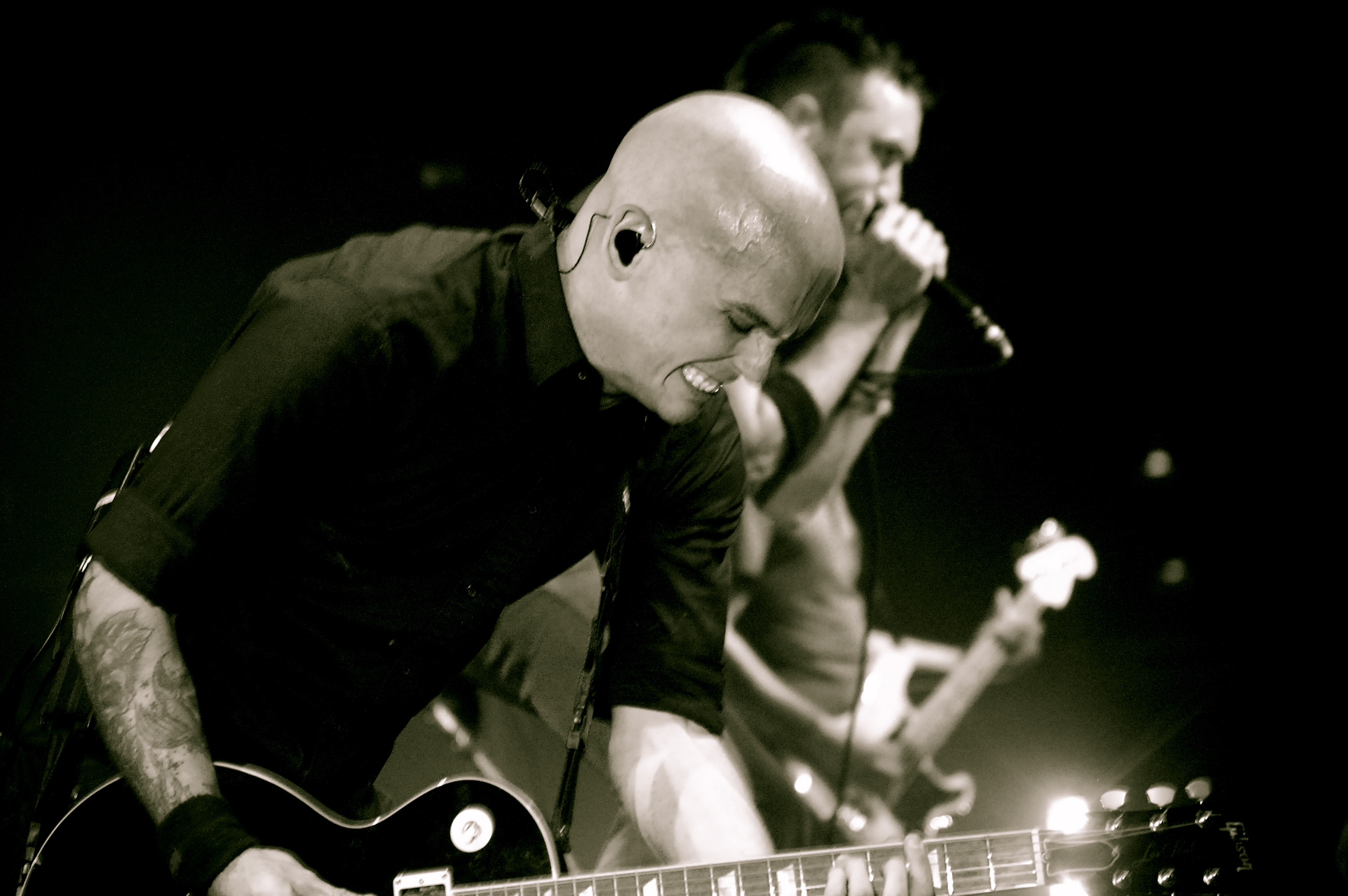
Zach Blair (left) performing with his current band Rise Against in 2008

Following the group's initial split, the Blair brothers continued working in various bands together over the next several years. They formed Armstrong and released Dick, the Lion-Hearted in 2002, featuring Gwar drummer Brad Roberts. Four songs from the album were originally co-written by Zach Blair and George Reagan, intended for release on the rejected Hagfish album.^{[5]} The Blair brothers joined Only Crime in 2003 with longtime friend and Hagfish producer Bill Stevenson (of the Descendents, All and Black Flag), along with founding members Russ Rankin (of Good Riddance) and Aaron Dalbec (of Bane). This lineup released two albums, To the Nines and Virulence, before the Blair brothers would move on to other projects. In 2006, the Blair brothers and Stevenson appeared with instrumental band The Mag Seven on the album The Future Is Ours, If You Can Count.

After the breakup of Hagfish, Reagan went on to homegrown hip hop group The Brothers, but mainly moved his focus to his two children, while Tony Barsotti started his own furniture design company.^{[5]} Prior to Hagfish disbanding, Zach Blair played with Gwar as Flattus Maximus from 1999–2002, appearing on the live album You're All Worthless and Weak, in addition to the band's eighth studio album, Violence Has Arrived. Zach Blair would later become lead guitarist for Rise Against in 2007, touring with the group before making his debut on the album Appeal to Reason the following year. In 2011, the band released Endgame, their most successful album to date, peaking at No. 2 on the US Billboard 200. That year, Reagan created Hagfish is Dead, a blog that covers topics ranging from band recommendations to notable music videos.^{[6]} Doni Blair joined the Toadies following their reformation and release of No Deliverance in 2008, touring behind the album and its follow-up, Feeler. He made his first recorded appearance with the group on Play.Rock.Music, released on July 31, 2012.

== Band members ==
- George Stroud Reagan III – lead vocals (1993–2001, 2003–2004, 2006, 2010, 2012, 2014, 2015, 2016, 2017, 2018, 2019)
- Zach Blair – guitar, backing vocals (1991–2001, 2003–2004, 2006, 2010, 2012, 2014, 2015, 2016, 2017, 2018, 2019)
- Doni Blair – bass guitar (1991–2001, 2003–2004, 2006, 2010, 2012, 2014, 2015, 2016, 2017, 2018, 2019)
- Tony Barsotti – drums, backing vocals (1993–2001, 2003–2004, 2006, 2010, 2012, 2014, 2015, 2016, 2017, 2018, 2019)

Former members

- Banning Lyon – drums (1991–1992, 1993)
- James Newhouse – lead vocals (1991–1992)
- John Frum – drums (1992)
- Mike Brown – guitar (1992)
- Scott Carter – drums (1993)

== Discography ==
=== Studio albums ===
Year	Album details
1993	Buick Men: Released: 1993; Label: Dragon Street Records (70193); Formats: CD, cassette (CS)
1995	...Rocks Your Lame Ass: Released: June 27, 1995; Label: London Records (422-828-626); Formats: CD, CS
1998	Hagfish: Released: March 24, 1998; Label: Honest Don's Records (DON015); Formats: CD, LP

=== Live albums ===
Year	Album details
1999	Caught Live: Released: March 2, 1999; Label: Coldfront Records (CF-018); Format: CD

=== Compilation albums ===
Year	Album details
2001	That Was Then, This Is Then: Released: January 16, 2001; Label: Coldfront Records (CF-027); Format: CD

=== Extended plays ===
Note that like the band's final studio album, both EPs are self-titled.

Year	EP details	Tracks
1994	Hagfish: Released: 1994; Label: BYO Records (BYO 032); Format: 7" vinyl	1. "Stamp"; 2. "Shark"; 3. "Minit Maid"; 4. "Trixie"
1997	Hagfish: Released: 1997; Label: Go-Kart Records (GK 032); Format: 7" vinyl	1. "Moaner"; 2. "Crush"; 3. "Shiner"; 4. "Moon"

=== Singles ===
- "Stamp (Eat It While I Work)" (1995) London Records
- "Happiness" (1995) London Records (promotional only)

=== Soundtracks and compilations ===
- Get It Through Your Thick Skull (1993) Idol Records – "Minit Maid"
- We're From Texas (1993) Scratched Records – "Happiness" (demo)
- How to Start a Fight (1996) Side One Dummy Recordings – "Red, White & Blue"
- Barb Wire Soundtrack (1996) London Records – "Hot Child in the City" (Nick Gilder)
- Sample This! (1997) BYO Records/Big Daddy Records – "Moon"
- Before You Were Punk (1997) Vagrant Records – "Walking in L.A." (Missing Persons)
- Come On Feel the Metal (1997) Steve Records – "Dirty Deeds Done Dirt Cheap" (AC/DC)
- Honest Don's Greatest Shits (1998) Honest Don's – "100% Woman"
- The Blasting Room (1999) Owned & Operated Recordings – "Moaner"
- Music to Listen to Music By (1999) Coldfront Records – "Stamp" (live)
- Going Nowhere Fast... (1999) Destined to Fail Recordings – "Envy"
- Serial Killer Compilation (1999) Fearless Records – "California"
- Not So Quiet on the Coldfront (2002) Coldfront Records – "Teenage Kicks" (The Undertones)
