= Bracket (band) =

American rock band

- Origin: Forestville, California, United States
- Genres: Punk rock, power pop, pop punk, alternative rock, melodic hardcore, indie rock, folk rock, baroque pop
- Years active: 1992–present
- Labels: Caroline, Fat Wreck Chords, Hi-Rise, Too Hep, Takeover
- Members: Marty Gregori; Zack Charlos; Ray Castro; Angelo Celli
- Past members: Larry Tinney
- Website: bracket.bandcamp.com

Bracket is an American rock band from Forestville, California formed in 1992. The lineup consists of lead vocalist and guitarist Marty Gregori, bassist and backing vocalist Zack Charlos, drummer Ray Castro, and guitarist and backing vocalist Angelo Celli, who replaced Larry Tinney in 1998. Bracket has issued numerous albums, EPs and singles since its inception, including many releases for Caroline Records and Fat Wreck Chords. Their sound could most easily be described as power pop influenced punk rock with a continued focus on vocal harmonies.^{[1]}^{[2]}^{[3]}

Bracket emerged during the pop punk resurgence of the early 1990s and released its first two albums 924 Forestville St. (1994) and 4-Wheel Vibe (1995) on Caroline Records.^{[1]} Following a staff shake-up, the label dropped the group and cancelled the release of its third album Like You Know in 1996.^{[4]} Bracket's next two albums Novelty Forever (1997) and When All Else Fails (2000) were put out by Fat Wreck Chords, who had previously issued 7-inch vinyl for the band.^{[5]} Having completed multiple tours of the United States and trips to Canada, Europe and Japan throughout their career,^{[2]} Bracket released Live in a Dive (2002) which gathered some of the band's best-known material into one performance.^{[5]} After building their own studio, the group took several years to write, record and self-produce its sixth album Requiem (2006), released by Takeover Records. Bracket began work on a new album in 2011, detailing each stage of the recording process on its official Facebook page.^{[6]} Like You Know and the three volume rarities collection Rare Cuts were issued as digital downloads in 2013 to help fund the band's upcoming projects.^{[7]} Bracket's seventh studio album, Hold Your Applause was released in August 2014.^{[6]}^{[7]}August 2016 saw the release of Bracket's eighth full-length album, The Last Page. The 70 minute album consisted of one “song”, the 28th installment of their “Warren’s Song” series. The band recorded nearly 100 short fragments of songs, with the intention of piecing them together to create the 70 minute “Warren’s Song Pt. 28”. Bracket completed work on their ninth studio album Too Old to Die Young in late 2018, which was released on May 31, 2019.

== History ==
=== Background ===
In the late 1980s while attending El Molino High in Forestville, California, friends Marty Gregori and Larry Tinney bonded over a mutual admiration for rock band AC/DC and began teaching each other guitar chords.^{[8]} After joining up with schoolmates Zack Charlos and Ray Castro they formed High Output, an early incarnation of the band that would later become known as Bracket. During these initial stages, the group played cover songs by Tom Petty, Creedence Clearwater Revival and the Rolling Stones, with its earliest performances appearing at weddings, bar mitzvahs and high school parties.^{[8]} In the fall of 1991, Gregori and Charlos penned their first original song, "Why Should Eye", just before relocating to Los Angeles where they made an attempt at starting a new project. Following an unsuccessful two months, Charlos moved back home and reconnected with Tinney and Castro. Gregori stayed behind for another year but continued to exchange song ideas with Tinney through telephone answering machine messages.

=== Early years and Caroline era (1992–1996) ===
When frontman Marty Gregori returned to Forestville in 1992, the quartet regrouped under the name Bracket after choosing the word at random from the dictionary. The band played shows across the Bay Area on a frequent basis and self-released The Giant Midget E.P. in 1993, exhibiting a pop punk sound they would continue to build upon.^{[1]} Their first album 924 Forestville St. was released in May 1994 through Caroline Records, a label that had previously issued debuts by a wide range of alternative rock acts including Hole, the Smashing Pumpkins, Wax and White Zombie. The album's title is likely a tongue-in-cheek reference combining the name of longtime punk rock establishment 924 Gilman Street with the band's nearby hometown of Forestville. Sessions were held at Prairie Sun Studios in Cotati, California with producer Joe Marquez. The album included the first installment of tracks to be named after bassist Zack Charlos' childhood friend Warren Rake ("Warren's Song, Pt. 1" and "Warren's Song, Pt. 2"), a theme that has remained consistent throughout the band's career.

After a request to release 7-inch vinyl was turned down by Caroline, Bracket began issuing the format on Fat Wreck Chords during the interim between albums.^{[5]} The band's singles Bs. and Stinky Fingers were both released by Fat in 1994 with cover art that parodied Pearl Jam's Vs. and the Rolling Stones' Sticky Fingers respectively. Their song "2RAK005" was featured on the budget compilation Fat Music for Fat People, which not only brought the track increased exposure but also helped introduce the group to a wider audience. Bracket released 4-Wheel Vibe in May 1995, its second album for Caroline Records produced by Don Fleming. The album expanded on the pop punk style of their debut while beginning to showcase a wider range of songwriting, later described by Fat Wreck Chords as "catchy, quirky, guitar driven power noise pop."^{[5]} 4-Wheel Vibe was promoted with continued touring, a prestigious John Peel Session and music videos for "Trailer Park" and "Circus Act".

Bracket promptly returned to the studio in the spring of 1996 to complete its third album Like You Know at Prairie Sun with Marquez returning to the controls. The month-long session would play a pivotal role in the band's development, hinting at later experimentation and deviation from the confines of pop punk.^{[4]} While augmenting their sound with wurlitzer, vintage guitar effects and percussive toys, help was enlisted from studio musicians (including a string quartet, horn section, keyboardist and pedal steel player) whose subtle contributions added depth to the recordings. After a catalog number was assigned and promotional albums were distributed, a change in staff at Caroline resulted in Bracket being dropped from the label and Like You Know was shelved.^{[4]} Five songs from the album were remixed and released subsequently on the F Is for Fat EP. In November 1996, Bracket issued E Is for Everything on Fat Wreck Chords, which compiled previously released vinyl material.

=== Fat Wreck Chords albums (1997–2002) ===
While preparing for its next album, Bracket toured the United States with a variety of acts including NOFX, SNFU, Tilt, the Smoking Popes, MxPx and Everclear.^{[1]}^{[5]} In March 1997, their cover of "867-5309/Jenny" appeared on Before You Were Punk, a tribute album for Vagrant Records. Having already traveled throughout the US, Canada and Europe, the band visited Japan for performances with Husking Bee and Sprocket Wheel in July 1997.^{[2]}^{[5]} Although Bracket had been issuing vinyl on Fat Wreck Chords since 1994, their first studio album for the label didn't transpire until the September 1997 release of Novelty Forever, co-produced by Ryan Greene and Fat Mike at Motor Studios in San Francisco. With its unconventional chord progressions and harmonized vocals on full display, the album featured noticeably polished production as compared to earlier outings. Album track "Sour" exhibited the band's keen sense of power pop and was later included on the Physical Fatness compilation in November of that year.

Novelty Forever would be the last album to include guitarist Larry Tinney who met his second wife following a tour stop in Washington, eventually leaving Bracket. Due to his indefinite departure and the remaining members eagerness to continue working on music, they began considering the possibility of a replacement. During this transitional period, Gregori was approached by his younger cousin Angelo Celli who presented the band with a self-recorded 4-track cassette of himself playing Bracket songs on guitar while both singing and providing vocal harmonies to them. The group quickly realized Celli would make an ideal bandmate and he joined officially in 1998. Bracket appeared along with the Fastbacks at the annual Noise Pop Festival in February 1999,^{[9]} having previously performed at the event from 1994 to 1997. Later that year, the remaining tracks from Like You Know were contributed to a split EP with Humble Beginnings on Too Hep Records. The band played multiple shows along the West Coast in early 2000 with labelmates No Use for a Name, Good Riddance and the Mad Caddies.^{[5]}^{[10]}

Bracket returned to Motor Studios with Greene reprising his role as producer and completed When All Else Fails, their second full-length for Fat Wreck Chords and fifth album overall, released in May 2000. While the band continued to mature beyond its pop punk contemporaries,^{[3]} their album seamlessly picked up where the expansive Novelty Forever left off and included a return appearance from Fat Mike who co-wrote and supplied guitar on "No Brainer".^{[5]} Despite generally positive reviews upon release, Bracket felt the two-week recording session for When All Else Fails was rushed and lacked many vocal embellishments they had planned yet didn't get a chance to incorporate. Gregori later explained he was proud of the songs but thought the album sounded unfinished.^{[6]} The leadoff track "Everyone Is Telling Me I'll Never Win, If I Fall in Love with a Girl From Marin" was featured on More RPM's Than Floyd on a Scooter, a free sampler used to promote releases from Fat and its subsidiaries Honest Don's and Pink and Black.

In February 2002, Bracket issued Live in a Dive, the second installment in a series of live albums for Fat Wreck Chords which also included releases by No Use for a Name, Swingin' Utters and Lagwagon, among others. The performance was recorded on August 14, 1999, when Bracket appeared in support of Tilt at Bottom of the Hill in San Francisco.^{[5]} Under the guidance of Fat Mike,^{[10]} the band organized a set that culled material from all its existing studio albums and tracks found on the Live Fat, Die Young and Short Music for Short People compilations. The insert for Live in a Dive contained a comic book story written by Bracket with artwork from John Estes, Kevin Cross and Rick Remender. Additionally, CD versions featured an enhanced portion with interview segments and music videos.^{[1]}

=== Requiem and the Good Life Crisis (2003–2009) ===
Bracket spent the next several years writing and recording at Trailer Park Studios, which was built by drummer Ray Castro with help from the other band members, inside an abandoned trailer on the Gregori family property.^{[10]} Enjoying a newfound sense of freedom, the band took its time to produce, engineer and mix the sessions themselves.^{[1]} While pushing the boundaries further on their unique brand of pop punk, Bracket completed an album that combined lush vocal harmonies reminiscent of the Beach Boys with the straightforward songwriting characteristics of the Descendents.^{[11]}^{[12]} Initially intended for release on Fat Wreck Chords, the band's finished sixth album Requiem was rejected by their longtime label.^{[10]}^{[12]} The group ultimately settled on releasing the ambitious concept album of sorts through Takeover Records in February 2006. Stewart Mason of AllMusic described Requiem as "wide-ranging and immensely tuneful ... with some delightful psychedelic and sunshine pop touches."^{[13]} The album was similarly praised by Razorcake who called it "a seventeen-movement rock 'n' roll symphony",^{[14]} while Exclaim.ca writer Stuart Green declared, "This could be the punk rock equivalent of Pet Sounds", noting, "it's what Jawbreaker might have sounded like if Brian Wilson had produced 24 Hour Revenge Therapy."^{[15]} Requiem consisted exclusively of "Warren's Song, Pt. 10" through "Warren's Song, Pt. 26", however the tracks didn't appear in succession. Unlike previous studio albums, the band declined to tour behind its release.^{[10]}

After Castro moved to Denver, Colorado for a job relocation, Bracket became less active. With the other members remaining in California, they formed the Good Life Crisis in 2007.^{[16]} This bluegrass influenced side project included Gregori playing ukulele, Charlos playing acoustic guitar and Celli playing mandolin. That same year the trio began performing locally, with sets that consisted of original material, Bracket tracks and occasional cover songs by the Beatles, Nirvana, NOFX and Tenacious D. Before work on the next Bracket album eventually commenced, the Good Life Crisis had released songs through its MySpace and YouTube pages but a physical release was never issued under this moniker.^{[17]} In December 2009, Bracket appeared on Wrecktrospective, a three-disc compilation celebrating the twentieth anniversary of Fat Wreck Chords.

=== Digital albums and Hold Your Applause (2010–present) ===
Bracket began hinting towards the possibility of a new album on its official Facebook page in February 2010,^{[6]} but the members had yet to reconvene until later that year. Following some advance preparation, the band (along with Tinney guesting on select tracks) played a one-off show in Marin County on November 26, 2010.^{[18]} Bracket announced plans for a seventh studio album in June 2011.^{[6]} They posted regular updates to Facebook over the next several years which detailed each stage of the recording process and also expressed interest in self-releasing the new material. After lying unreleased for 17 years, Bracket issued its lost third album Like You Know as a digital download through their Bandcamp page on January 7, 2013.^{[7]} This marked the first time the songs would officially appear together with their original sequencing and mixes.^{[4]} They also released the rarities collection Rare Cuts (in three separate installments) which included compilation tracks, B-sides, demo recordings and alternate versions of songs spanning their entire catalog. The sale of these digital only releases helped to finance their home recording sessions and a physical format pressing of the upcoming album. Requiem was made available for free streaming on the band's Bandcamp page in October 2013. The new album Hold Your Applause was released in August 2014, while progress continues on an additional forthcoming album. On June 30, 2016, Bracket announced a release date of August 5 and unveiled the cover for their next album, titled The Last Page. The album will consist of the lone track "Warren's Song Part 28" and will clock in at over 70 minutes long. This is Bracket's eighth full-length album, and their first since 2014's Hold Your Applause. ^{[6]}^{[7]}

== Band members ==
Current members

- Marty Gregori – lead vocals, guitars (1992–present)
- Zack Charlos – bass guitar, backing vocals (1992–present)
- Ray Castro – drums, percussion (1992–present)
- Angelo Celli – guitars, backing vocals (1998–present)

Former members

- Larry Tinney – guitars (1992–1998)

== Discography ==
Bracket discography
- Studio albums: 9
- Extended plays: 5
- Live albums: 1
- Compilation albums: 4
- Singles: 5
- Music videos: 6
- Other appearances: 21

=== Studio albums ===
Year	Album details
1994	924 Forestville St.: Released: May 24, 1994; Label: Caroline Records (CAROL 1754); Formats: CD, cassette (CS), LP
1995	4-Wheel Vibe: Released: May 16, 1995; Label: Caroline Records (CAROL 1787); Formats: CD, CS, LP
1996	Like You Know: Released: 1996^{[a]}; Label: Caroline Records (CAR 7530 AD); Formats: CD, CS,^{[b]} digital download
1997	Novelty Forever: Released: September 23, 1997; Label: Fat Wreck Chords (FAT 559); Formats: CD, CS, LP
2000	When All Else Fails: Released: May 9, 2000; Label: Fat Wreck Chords (FAT 607); Formats: CD, LP
2006	Requiem: Released: February 7, 2006; Label: Takeover Records (TAK008); Formats: CD, digital download
2014	Hold Your Applause: Released: August 5, 2014; Label: High Output Records; Formats: CD, LP,^{[c]} digital download
2016	The Last Page: Released: August 5, 2016; Label: High Output Records; Formats: CD, LP,^{[c]} digital download
2019	Too Old to Die Young: Released: May 31, 2019; Label: Fat Wreck Chords (FAT121-1); Formats: CD, LP, digital download

- aLimited CD release; officially released in 2013.
- bCS released by Stray Cat & Chocolate Shake Records.
- cLP released by Head2Wall Records.

=== Live albums ===
Year	Album details
2002	Live in a Dive: Released: February 26, 2002; Label: Fat Wreck Chords (FAT 602); Formats: CD, LP

=== Compilation albums ===
Year	Album details
1996	E Is for Everything on Fat Wreck Chords: Released: November 19, 1996; Label: Fat Wreck Chords (FAT 548); Formats: CD, CS
2013	Rare Cuts - Vol. 1: Released: March 12, 2013; Label: self-released; Format: digital download
2013	Rare Cuts - Vol. 2: Released: June 3, 2013; Label: self-released; Format: digital download
2013	Rare Cuts - Vol. 3: Released: November 11, 2013; Label: self-released; Format: digital download

=== Extended plays ===
Year	EP details
1993	The Giant Midget E.P.: Released: 1993; Label: High Output Records (15427); Formats: 7-inch, CS
1996	4 Rare Vibes: Released: April 9, 1996; Label: Caroline Records (CAR 1482); Formats: 12-inch, CD
1996	F Is for Fat: Released: August 26, 1996; Label: Fat Wreck Chords (FAT 549–7); Format: 2x7-inch
1997	Appetite for Food: Released: 1997; Label: High Output Records (002); Format: CD
1999	Age & Experience Vs. Youth & Cunning: Released: 1999; Label: Too Hep Records (TH012); Format: 2xCD split (with Humble Beginnings)

=== Singles ===
Year	Release details	Tracks
1994	Bs.: Released: 1994; Label: Fat Wreck Chords; Format: 7-inch	1. "Why Should Eye"^{[a]}; 2. "Missing Link"
1994	Stinky Fingers: Released: 1994; Label: Fat Wreck Chords; Format: 7-inch	1. "2RAK005"^{[b]}; 2. "WWF"; 3. "Warren's Song, Pt. 3"
1994	5:35: Released: 1994 (UK); Label: Hi-Rise Recordings; Formats: 7-inch, CD	1. "Huge Balloon"^{[a]}; 2. "Why Should Eye"; 3. "Mother to Blame" (CD version only)
1995	Trailer Park: Released: 1995 (UK); Label: Hi-Rise Recordings; Format: CD	1. "Trailer Park"^{[c]}; 2. "Stylin'"; 3. "Warren's Song, Pt. 5"
1995	For Those About to Mock: Released: 1995; Label: Fat Wreck Chords; Format: 7-inch	1. "Talk Show"^{[b]}; 2. "Homesick" (original pressings only); 3. "My Stepson"

- a Single from the album 924 Forestville St. (1994).
- b Non-album single; later released on E Is for Everything on Fat Wreck Chords (1996).
- c Single from the album 4-Wheel Vibe (1995).

=== Music videos ===
Year	Song	Director	Album
1994	"Why Should Eye"	David Hale	924 Forestville St.
1995	"Trailer Park"	David Hale	4-Wheel Vibe
1995	"Circus Act"	David Hale	4-Wheel Vibe
1997	"2RAK005"	Brian Archer	Non-album single^{[a]}
2019	"A Hot Comedy"	Jeff Sorley	Too Old to Die Young
2021	"Warren’s Song, Pt. 17"	Ben Mills	Requiem

- aReleased on the Fat Wreck Chords video compilation Peepshow.

=== Other appearances ===
The following is a list of Bracket songs that have appeared on compilations, including samplers and tributes.

Year	Song	Album	Comments
1993	"Imaginary Friend"	Shreds Volume 1: The Best of Underground Rock	Previously released on Giant Midget. Later released on Rare Cuts - Vol. 1.
1994	"2RAK005"	Fat Music for Fat People	Previously released on Stinky Fingers. Later released on E Is for Everything on Fat Wreck Chords.
1996	"Small Talk"	Happy Meals: A Smorgasbord of My Favorite Songs	Later released on Rare Cuts - Vol. 1.
1996	"Eating Pie"	Live 105 Ten Year Anniversary: 1986–1996	Taken from the album Like You Know. Later released on F Is for Fat and E Is for Everything on Fat Wreck Chords.
1996	"Schmooze King"	Club Stoat Volume 1	Previously released on 4 Rare Vibes.
1996	"Talk Show"	Survival of the Fattest	Previously released on For Those About to Mock. Later released on E Is for Everything on Fat Wreck Chords.
1997	"867-5309/Jenny"	Before You Were Punk	Cover of a 1981 Tommy Tutone song. Later released on Rare Cuts - Vol. 2.
1997	"Sour"	Physical Fatness	Previously released on Novelty Forever.
1999	"Optimist"	Punk Ass Generosity	Previously released on Novelty Forever.
1999	"Shoe Gazer"	Serial Killer Compilation	Taken from the album Like You Know.
1999	"Serena Hides"	The World According to Stone Entertainment	Taken from the album Like You Know.
1999	"Betterman"	Going Nowhere Fast...	Taken from the album Like You Know.
1999	"Warren's Song, Pt. 8"	Short Music for Short People	Later released on Rare Cuts - Vol. 3.
1999	"2RAK005"	Unscrubbed: Live From the Laundromat III	Live acoustic version recorded at The Brainwash Laundromat. Later released on Rare Cuts - Vol. 1.
2000	"Everyone Is Telling Me I'll Never Win, If I Fall in Love with a Girl from Marin"	More RPM's Than Floyd on a Scooter	Previously released on When All Else Fails.
2001	"My Boyfriend's Back"	Playing 4 Square	Cover of a 1963 Angels song. Later released on Rare Cuts - Vol. 3.
2001	"Hearing Aid"	Live Fat, Die Young	Later released on Rare Cuts - Vol. 3.
2001	"Do You Remember Rock 'n' Roll Radio?"	Ramones Maniacs	Cover of a 1980 Ramones song. Later released on Rare Cuts - Vol. 1.
2006	"Warren's Song, Pt. 19"	AMP Magazine Sampler Volume 19	Previously released on Requiem.
2006	"Keep It Close to Me"	A Tribute to Superdrag	Cover of a 2000 Superdrag song. Later released on Rare Cuts - Vol. 2.
2009	"Everyone Is Telling Me I'll Never Win, If I Fall in Love with a Girl from Marin"	Wrecktrospective	Acoustic version recorded at Trailer Park Studios. Later released on Rare Cuts - Vol. 3.
