= Buick Men =

Studio album by Hagfish
- Released: 1993
- Recorded: July–September 1993 at Goodnight Dallas in Dallas, Texas
- Genre: Punk rock, alternative rock
- Length: 39:39
- Label: Dragon Street Records
- Producer: Patrick Keel

Hagfish chronology
Buick Men (1993)	...Rocks Your Lame Ass (1995)

Buick Men is the debut studio album by the American rock band Hagfish. It was released in 1993 on Dragon Street Records. Eight of the album's tracks would be re-recorded for the follow-up Rocks Your Lame Ass.

== Critical reception ==
Trouser Press wrote that the band "sets broad locker-room humor against cuddly (if raucous) power pop riffing. Since they’re as willing to mock themselves (see 'New Punk Rock Song') as the outside things they lampoon, it’s hard to hold the dopiness of, say, 'Lesbian Girl' against Hagfish."

== Track listing ==
All songs written by George Stroud Reagan III except where noted.

1. "Happiness" – 1:55
2. "Stamp" – 2:27
3. "Flat" – 2:22
4. "Secret" – 1:47
5. "Gertrude" (Reagan, Zach Blair, Doni Blair) – 2:47
6. "Moda" (Reagan, Z. Blair) – 1:52
7. "Sad" – 2:54
8. "Trixie" – 2:05
9. "New Punk Rock Song" – 1:08
10. "Disappointed" – 2:29
11. "Minit Maid" (Reagan, Z. Blair) – 1:52
12. "Hose" (Reagan, Z. Blair, D. Blair) – 3:04
13. "Shark" – 1:31
14. "Lesbian Girl" – 2:22
15. "Herve" – 1:50
16. "Aquarium" – 2:00
17. "Mouse" – 1:48

Bonus tracks

18. "Ambulance" – 1:14
19. "Land Shark (alt. mix)" – 1:31

== Personnel ==
- George Stroud Reagan III – lead vocals
- Zach Blair – guitar, backing vocals
- Doni Blair – bass guitar
- Tony Barsotti – drums, backing vocals

Additional personnel

- Scott Carter – drums on tracks 2, 4, 6, 8, 9, 13–17 and 19
- Patrick Keel – producer
- David Dennard – executive producer, creative direction
- Kerry Crafton – engineer
- John Berka – assistant engineer
- Todd Linton – assistant engineer
- Frank Laudo – design, art direction
- John Noeding – cover photograph, CD surface
- Jack L. Zeman – band photography
