= Happy to Be Sad =

Happy to Be Sad may refer to:

- "Happy to Be Sad", a song by Bracket from their 1995 album 4-Wheel Vibe
- "Happy to Be Sad", a song by Ben Platt from his 2021 album Reverie
