= Squirrel vs Bear =

- Origin: Chico, California, United States
- Genres: Synthpop
- Years active: 2003–2006
- Past members: Ronald Barker; Morgan Fleischmann; Kirt Lind; Ryan Maker
- Website: myspace.com/squirrelvsbear

Squirrel vs Bear was an American synthpop band from Chico, California. They released two records, went on a national tour, played with bands such as The Thermals and the Epoxies, and achieved regional popularity before officially disbanding in 2006.

== History ==
The band was started in 2003 by members Ronald Barker, Morgan Fleischmann, Kirt Lind, and Ryan Maker. In October 2004, the band entered the Black Lodge Studio in Chico to record their first record. Tracked live in three days, The No Business was released in March 2005.

In September 2005, Squirrel vs Bear embarked on their first and only national tour with their sister band, The Cheat. The tour proved an enormous strain on the band's relationship, and by the end they had decided to disband. In December, they played their final show, and ceased operations as a live band to focus on working in the studio.

In September 2006, Squirrel vs Bear Thrill Her was finally completed and released. It was recorded over the course of a year in their home studio. Whereas their first record was recorded live, Thrill Her was more produced and overdubbed, heavily featuring the MicroKorg and Akai MPC. The band played a reunion show on September 2, 2006, to coincide with the release of the record, which was the last time the band is expected to perform live.

== Sound ==
The band's sound is best described as synth-pop, although the terms dance-punk, post-punk and new-wave have also been used. They are also notorious for covering Hip-hop and R&B artists such as Michael Jackson, Murs, Ciara, Dr. Octagon, and Prince.

== Discography ==
- The No Business, 2005
- Squirrel vs Bear Thrill Her, 2006
