= Novelty Forever =

Studio album by Bracket
- Released: September 23, 1997
- Recorded: Motor Studios, San Francisco, California and Prairie Sun, Cotati
- Genre: Punk rock, power pop, pop punk
- Length: 32:07
- Label: Fat Wreck Chords
- Producer: Ryan Greene, Bracket, Fat Mike

Bracket chronology
E Is for Everything on Fat Wreck Chords (1996)	Novelty Forever (1997)	When All Else Fails (2000)

Professional ratings
Review scores
Source	Rating
Allmusic	3/5 stars
Punknews.org	link

Novelty Forever is the fourth album by Californian punk rock band Bracket, released by Fat Wreck Chords on September 23, 1997. The album would be the last to feature founding guitarist Larry Tinney and the first to be produced by Ryan Greene, along with Fat Mike.

Although Bracket had been issuing vinyl releases on Fat Wreck Chords since 1994, Novelty Forever marked the band's first full-length for the label. Prior to the album's release, "The Evil Bean" was included on the Appetite for Food EP. "Sour" was later featured on the compilation Physical Fatness.

== Track listing ==
All songs written and composed by Bracket.

1. "Last Day Sunday" – 3:03
2. "Three Gardens" – 2:40
3. "The Evil Bean" – 2:44
4. "Don't Tell Miss Fenley" – 2:28
5. "Sour" – 2:22
6. "Back to Allentown" – 2:56
7. "Little Q & A" – 2:50
8. "One More Hangover Day (Warren's Song, Pt. 7)" – 3:34
9. "I Won't Mind" – 2:29
10. "Optimist" – 2:10
11. "Drama Queen" – 3:31
12. "Little Q & A (Reprise)" – 1:13

== Personnel ==
- Marty Gregori – vocals, guitar
- Larry Tinney – guitar
- Zack Charlos – bass, vocals
- Ray Castro – drums
- Ryan Greene – producer
- Bracket – producer
- Fat Mike – producer
- Joe Marquez – engineer
- Peter Ellenby – photography
- Vinny Wintermeyer – photography
