= Hagfish (album) =

Studio album by Hagfish
- Released: March 24, 1998
- Recorded: September 16, 1997 to October 3, 1997
- Studio: The Blasting Room in Fort Collins, Colorado
- Genre: Punk rock, alternative rock
- Length: 35:47
- Label: Honest Don's Records
- Producer: Bill Stevenson, Stephen Egerton

Hagfish chronology
...Rocks Your Lame Ass (1995)	Hagfish (1998)	Caught Live (1999)

Professional ratings
Review scores
Source	Rating
AllMusic	3/5 stars

Hagfish is the third and final studio album by the American rock band Hagfish, released in March 1998 on Honest Don's Records, a subsidiary label of Fat Wreck Chords. The album was reworked following a long delay with the band's previous label, London Records, who rejected the band's initial offering and eventually dropped the group. Bill Stevenson and Stephen Egerton would both reprise their roles as producers, having previously worked with the band on Rocks Your Lame Ass. An early version of "18 Days" (originally titled "New Year's Song") and a live version of "Twisting" previously appeared as B-sides to the "Happiness" promotional single in 1995. Alternate versions of "Hand" and "Agent 37" later appeared on the compilation album That Was Then, This Is Then in 2001.

== Track listing ==
All songs written by George Stroud Reagan III and Hagfish except where noted.

1. "Anniversary Song" – 2:26
2. "Band" – 2:29
3. "Envy" – 2:20
4. "18 Days" – 1:05
5. "Hand" – 2:35
6. "Doo Doo Noggin" – 1:49
7. "Bop" – 1:51
8. "Closer" – 2:26
9. "Sucker" – 2:56
10. "Twisting" (John Flansburgh, John Linnell) – 1:48
11. "Goes Down" – 1:33
12. "Fruit" – 2:49
13. "100% Woman" – 2:24
14. "Alien" – 2:51
15. "Agent 37" – 4:27

== Personnel ==
- George Stroud Reagan III – lead vocals
- Zach Blair – guitar, backing vocals
- Doni Blair – bass guitar
- Tony Barsotti – drums, backing vocals

Additional personnel

- Bill Stevenson – producer, mixer, engineer
- Stephen Egerton – producer, mixer, engineer
- Jason Livermore – engineer
- Joe Gastwirt – mastering (Oceanview Mastering)
- Jennifer Stevens – cover model
- Blag Dahlia – photography
- Melanie Grizzel – photography
