= Only Crime and Outbreak =

EP by Only Crime and Outbreak
- Released: June 26, 2007
- Recorded: 2007
- Genre: Melodic hardcore, punk rock
- Length: 8:26
- Label: Think Fast!

Only Crime chronology
To the Nines (2004)	Only Crime and Outbreak (2007)	Pursuance (2014)

Only Crime and Outbreak is a split EP by punk bands Only Crime and Outbreak. It was released on June 26, 2007.

== Track listing ==
1. "Brand New Scene" – Only Crime – 2:35
2. "Revisionistic" – Only Crime – 2:49
3. "Single File" – Outbreak – 1:20
4. "Deaf and Blind" – Outbreak – 1:42

== Personnel ==
=== Only Crime ===
- Russ Rankin – vocals
- Zach Blair – guitar
- Aaron Dalbec – guitar
- Doni Blair – bass
- Bill Stevenson – drums
