= Banning Lyon =

Plaintiff in class action lawsuit

Banning Lyon is an American author, outdoor guide, and former phychiatric patient and plaintiff in a 1990s class action lawsuit against National Medical Enterprises, now Tenet Healthcare. His involvement in the lawsuit led to the publication of an autobiographical op-ed in The New York Times in October 1993. Lyon was born and raised in Southern California and was a founding member of the Hagfish punk rock band.

== Music ==
Banning Lyon co-founded the punk rock band Hagfish with Doni and Zach Blair in 1991. Lyon drummed for the band for approximately two years, opening for bands such as ALL, Swervedriver, and Poster Children. He finally left the band after several disagreements with the Blair brothers.

Lyon went on to reunite with high school friends Jarrod King (guitar) and Jef King (vocals), with Damon Earnheart on bass, to form the skate punk band Cleaners, based in the Dallas/Ft. Worth metroplex. They recorded and released Walking on Eggshells before ultimately splitting up in 1999.

== Juvenile mental healthcare ==
Shortly after his leaving Hagfish in 1993, Lyon became involved in a class action suit against National Medical Enterprises (NME), now known as Tenet Healthcare. The suit was led by Robert Andrews of the law firm Andrews and Clarke located in Ft. Worth, Texas.

Lyon authored an autobiographical op-ed for The New York Times that was published on October 13, 1993. The article details his having been hospitalized in a hospital owned by NME. Less than a week later, on October 18, Business Week published an article detailing Lyon's story, going on to further detail the Federal government's involvement in an ongoing investigation of NME. That investigation led to what would become one of the largest health-care-fraud cases in American medical history.

Shortly after the publishing of the articles, National Medical Enterprises agreed to settle out of court. In June 1994, Peter Alexis and NME pleaded guilty to federal criminal and civil charges that included paying kickbacks to doctors in return for patient referrals. The chain paid a $379 million fine. At the time it was the largest fine levied for health care fraud.

In February 1995, the doctors that had been defendants in the class action suit in which Lyon had been involved sued Lyon, his attorney Robert Andrews, and others. The doctors claimed that Lyon and the others had defamed them, citing Lyon's statements previously made in The Dallas Morning News and Business Week. The case was ultimately dropped by the doctors.

In 2024, Maria Shriver's The Open Field, an imprint of Penguin, published his autobiography The Chair and the Valley. Kirkus Reviews described the book as "[a] heartfelt memoir and an urgent demand for higher standards of juvenile mental health care", while Booklist called it "positively outstanding storytelling" and a book that "can not be put down".

== Outdoors ==
Lyon lives in northern California and since 2011, has worked as a backpacking guide in Yosemite National Park.
