= Transient Songs =

- Origin: Seattle, Washington, United States
- Genres: singer–songwriter, psychedelic
- Instruments: Vocals, Guitars, Bass, Keyboard, Drums
- Years active: 2007 – present
- Label: Indian Casino Records
- Members: John Frum; Dayna Loeffler; Michael Shunk; Craig Keller; Brian Ackley
- Past members: Anday Gassaway, Ballard Bob (deceased), Ian Pina
- Website: www.TransientSongs.com

Transient Songs started as the recording–performing project of singer–songwriter John Frum. Transient Songs is based in Seattle, Washington, and releases music on the boutique label Indian Casino Records. Originally a duo with Andy Gassaway from Lawrence, Kansas on bass and slide guitar, the two released their first EP, Plantation to Your Youth in 2008 to acclaimed reviews. Many reviews noted similarities to early 1970s music such as the Byrds and Paisley Underground bands. Reviews also noted the density of the music, akin to British rock fuzz forerunners The Jesus and Mary Chain.

Prior to Transient Songs, Frum played in a myriad of obscure yet respected North Texas garage bands such as Grit and HassleHorse (An extensive history on this scene: Haltom City Nights: An Oral History was written by music journalist Ken Shimamoto in 2009). Frum also served a stint for the Dallas punk rock band Hagfish before the band went on to greater notoriety.

In 2010 Frum released his first LP "Cave Syndrome". The album brought more arrangements in the form of cello and violin and received strong reviews and was featured in Paste's "Best of What's Next" column.

After the release of Cave Syndrome Frum ran into a previous an old friend who he had begun working on songs with prior to the release of Cave Syndrome, Michael Shunk and the two began working on material from the album and new songs. In conjunction Frum began to enlist other bandmates: Ian Pina on drums and Dayna Loeffler on bass and guitar switching instruments with bandmate Andy Gassaway. As the five piece began working on arrangements Gassaway departed for San Diego and Transient Songs began working on new material as a full band. The band released the album "Foreign Rooms" in 2013 to little fanfare with no publicity run. Transient Songs is back in the studio working on the third full-length release "Stealing Stand" with a release date slated late 2016.

== Discography ==
=== EP ===
Plantation to your Youth (2008 Indian Casino)

=== Full-length albums ===
Cave Syndrome (2010 Indian Casino)

=== Compilations ===
XO for the Holidays II

== Members ==
- John Frum - guitars, vocals
- Dayna Loeffler - bass, backup vocals,
- Michael Shunk - guitar,
- Craig Keller - Drums
