= Virulence (album) =

Studio album by Only Crime
- Released: January 23, 2007
- Recorded: Blasting Room, Fort Collins, Colorado, U.S.
- Genre: Melodic hardcore
- Length: 27:54
- Label: Fat Wreck Chords
- Producer: Only Crime

Only Crime chronology
To the Nines (2004)	Virulence (2007)	Only Crime and Outbreak EP (2007)

Professional ratings
Review scores
Source	Rating
Allmusic	link

Virulence is the second full-length studio album from melodic hardcore band, Only Crime. It was released on January 23, 2007, and features the same line-up as the previous album, To the Nines, including Russ Rankin from Good Riddance, Bill Stevenson from Black Flag, Descendents and ALL, Aaron Dalbec from Bane, and the Blair Brothers from Hagfish.

== Track listing ==
All music written by Only Crime, all lyrics by Russ Rankin

1. "Take Me" – 2:36
2. "Everything For You" – 2:47
3. "Shotgun" – 3:00
4. "Eyes of the World" – 2:10
5. "Now's the Time" – 2:17
6. "In Your Eyes" – 0:39
7. "Just Us" – 2:46
8. "There's a Moment" – 2:38
9. "This is Wretched" – 2:17
10. "Too Loose" – 1:51
11. "Framed Then Failed" – 2:15
12. "Xanthology" – 2:39

== Credits ==
- Russ Rankin – vocals
- Zach Blair – guitar
- Aaron Dalbec – guitar
- Doni Blair – bass
- Bill Stevenson – drums
- Recorded at the Blasting Room, Fort Collins, Colorado, U.S.
- Produced by Only Crime
- Engineered by Johhny Schou, Jason Livermore, Andrew Berlin, and Bill Stevenson
