= 924 Forestville St. =

Studio album by Bracket
- Released: May 24, 1994
- Recorded: Prairie Sun Studios, Cotati, California
- Genre: Punk rock, power pop, pop punk
- Length: 40:12
- Label: Caroline
- Producer: Bracket, Joe Marquez

Bracket chronology
The Giant Midget E.P. (1993)	924 Forestville St. (1994)	4-Wheel Vibe (1995)

Professional ratings
Review scores
Source	Rating
AllMusic	3/5 stars
Music Week	3/5 stars

924 Forestville St. is the debut album by American punk rock band Bracket, released by Caroline Records in 1994. Recording sessions were held at Prairie Sun Studios in Cotati, California, with producer Joe Marquez.

Bracket issued two singles from the album, including "Why Should Eye" in the United States and "Huge Balloon" released in the United Kingdom. 924 Forestville St. is likely a tongue-in-cheek reference combining the name of longtime Bay Area punk rock establishment 924 Gilman Street with the band's nearby hometown of Forestville, California.

== Track listing ==
All songs written and composed by Bracket.

1. "Get It Rite" – 2:55
2. "Dodge Ball" – 3:42
3. "Missing Link" – 3:26
4. "Sleep" – 4:16
5. "Huge Balloon" – 2:47
6. "Stalking Stuffer" – 2:59
7. "Why Should Eye" – 2:26
8. "Warren's Song, Pt. 1" – 1:56
9. "Warren's Song, Pt. 2" – 2:47
10. "Can't Make Me" – 3:26
11. "Skanky Love Song" – 3:28
12. "J. Weed" – 3:13
13. "Rod's Post" – 2:51

== Personnel ==
- Marty Gregori – lead vocals, guitars
- Larry Tinney – guitars
- Zack Charlos – bass guitar
- Ray Castro – drums
- Joe Marquez – producer, engineer
- Bracket – producer, design concept
- Alan Douches – mastering (West West Side)
- Mark Edward – backing vocals on "J. Weed" and "Rod's Post"
- Pat Gillis – backing vocals on "J. Weed" and "Rod's Post"
- Troy Hahn – photography
- Ray Hall – photography
- Joey Hall – photography
- Pete Ciccone – design execution
- Tom Bejgrowicz – design execution
