= Only Crime =

American hardcore band

- Origin: U.S.
- Genres: Melodic hardcore
- Years active: 2003–present
- Labels: Rise Records, Fat Wreck Chords
- Members: Russ Rankin; Bill Stevenson; Dan Kelly; Matt Hoffman; Aaron Dalbec
- Past members: Zach Blair; Doni Blair
- Website: https://www.facebook.com/officialonlycrime

Only Crime is an American melodic hardcore group formed by Good Riddance singer Russ Rankin and Bane guitarist Aaron Dalbec in 2003. The band plays melodic but hard-hitting punk rock that borrows heavily from early-1980s hardcore bands such as Black Flag.

== History ==
=== Founding and first album ===
In 2002, Russ Rankin found himself ill-at-ease with the situation of his other band Good Riddance. The band did not play frequently, and Rankin wanted to tour more. He set out to form another band that would be more active and that would pursue his drug/alcohol-free aesthetics and lifestyle. When Russ was in the Blasting Room with Good Riddance to record Bound By Ties of Blood and Affection, he asked producer Bill Stevenson – drummer for punk bands Black Flag, Descendents, and All – to be the drummer in his new project. The band recorded a five-song demo in 2003, which they sent out to labels. In the February 2004, the band worked on new material and recording more demos to send to prospective labels. They played their first show on February 15, 2004, at the Starlight in Ft. Collins, CO. They were signed to Fat Wreck Chords by April 2004. They played some shows with Dropkick Murphys in April and May, and played on some Warped Tour dates that summer. Their debut album, To the Nines, was released in July 2004.

=== Second album and line-up changes ===
On January 23, 2007, Only Crime released their second album, Virulence, on Fat Wreck Chords, followed by a Split EP with Outbreak, released June 26, 2007 on Think Fast! Records.

In February 2007, Zach Blair had joined Rise Against. Shortly after, it was announced he was no longer in Only Crime and was replaced by Modern Life Is War guitarist Matt Hoffman.

Bassist Doni Blair played his last show with the band on August 15, 2007, in Kansas City, before leaving to spend more time with his family and pursue his instrumental project, the Mag Seven (also with Bill Stevenson). He was temporarily replaced by Zack Busby (Burden Brothers), and then permanently replaced by Dan Kelly (The Frisk). Doni Blair has been the bassist for The Toadies since 2008.

=== Third album ===
The band started working on their third album in 2009, but the band ended up getting put on hold for a while due to Stevenson being sick. In April 2013, Rankin claimed that their third album had been finished and that it would be released in 2013. In March 2014, it was announced that the album would finally be released. Titled Pursuance, it was released by Rise Records on May 13, 2014.

== Members ==
=== Current ===
- Russ Rankin – vocals (2003–present)
- Aaron Dalbec – guitar (2003–present)
- Bill Stevenson – drums (2003–present)
- Matt Hoffman – guitar (2007–present)
- Dan Kelly – bass (2008–present)

=== Former ===
- Zach Blair – guitar (2003–2007)
- Doni Blair – bass (2003–2007)
- Zack Busby – bass (touring only) (2007–2008)

== Discography ==
=== Studio albums ===
- To the Nines (2004)
- Virulence (2007)
- Pursuance (2014)

=== EPs ===
- Only Crime and Outbreak (2007)
  - Split EP with Outbreak

=== Compilation album appearances ===
- Anti-Floyd - The Terrier State (2004)
  - Includes "Tenebrae" from To the Nines
- Rock Against Bush, Vol. 2 (2004)
  - Includes "Doomsday Breach" from To the Nines
- In Honor: A Compilation to Beat Cancer (2004)
  - Includes the previously unreleased track "Hands of Failure"
- Thrasher Mag: Skate Rock, Vol. 12: Eat the Flag (2005)
  - Includes the previously unreleased track "Another Lie"
- iFloyd (2006)
  - Includes a demo version of "Everything for You" from Virulence
- Fat Wreck Chords X-Mas Bonus (2006)
  - Includes "Eyes of the World" from Virulence
- Warped Tour 2007 Tour Compilation
  - Includes "Take Me" from Virulence
- Hanuk-Comp (2007)
  - Includes the previously unreleased track "What We've Become"

=== Music videos ===
- "Life Was Fair" (2014)
