= Protect (political organization) =

Organization for the protection of children

National Association to Protect Children – PROTECT, Inc.
- Founded: June 24, 2002; 24 years ago
- Legal status: 501(c)(4) nonprofit organization
- Executive Director: Grier Weeks
- Affiliations: National Association to Protect Children Education Fund
- Revenue: $164,097 (2014)
- Expenses: $145,972 (2014)
- Employees: 1 (2013)
- Volunteers: 24 (2013)
- Website: www.protect.org
- Formerly called: National Association to Protect Children, Inc.

Protect (officially incorporated as National Association to Protect Children – PROTECT, Inc.) is a political organization established in 2002 and dedicated to the protection of children from abuse, exploitation, and neglect. It is a nonprofit 501(c)(4) membership association with members in every U.S. state and 10 nations. Protect achieved great success in its first three years, winning legislative victories in eight state legislatures.

== Support ==
In 2005, the punk rock record label Fat Wreck Chords released a charity record for Protect, entitled Protect: A Benefit for the National Association to Protect Children. Fat Wreck Chords publicist Vanessa Burt and Verbicide Magazine publisher Jackson Ellis created the project, with the help of the head of Fat Wreck, Fat Mike.

In 2009, a second punk rock compilation charity record, Protect II: A Benefit for the National Association to Protect Children, was released jointly by Geykido Comet Records and Scissor Press. This album was spearheaded by Verbicide publishers Jackson Ellis and Nate Pollard, along with Shahab Zargari and Heela Naqshband of GC Records.

NYDM, New York Death Militia, a worldwide metal music organization, sponsors metal music shows in support of Protect.

Former child actress Alison Arngrim, who was a victim of sexual abuse, lobbies for and speaks for Protect.

== See also ==
- Child abuse
- Child pornography
- Child sexual abuse
- Incest
