= When All Else Fails (Bracket album) =

Studio album by Bracket
- Released: May 9, 2000
- Recorded: Motor Studios, San Francisco, California, US
- Genre: Punk rock, power pop, pop punk
- Length: 38:29
- Label: Fat Wreck Chords
- Producer: Ryan Greene, Bracket

Bracket chronology
| Novelty Forever (1997) | When All Else Fails (2000) | Live in a Dive (2002) |

Professional ratings
Review scores
| Source | Rating |
|---|---|
| Kerrang! | 2/5 stars |

When All Else Fails is the fifth album by Californian punk rock band Bracket, released on May 9, 2000, through Fat Wreck Chords. The album would be the first to feature guitarist Angelo Celli, who replaced founding member Larry Tinney the previous year.

== Track listing ==
All songs written and composed by Bracket, except where noted.

1. "Everyone Is Telling Me I'll Never Win, If I Fall in Love with a Girl from Marin" – 2:37
2. "Parade" – 2:20
3. "No Brainer" (Fat Mike, Bracket) – 2:11
4. "Spazz" – 3:11
5. "Cynically Depressed" – 3:23
6. "Warren's Song, Pt. 9" – 2:55
7. "Me vs. The World" – 3:19
8. "You/Me" – 2:27
9. "S.O.B. Story" – 3:19
10. "A Happy Song" – 3:57
11. "Suicide Note" – 3:08
12. "Yoko Oh-No" – 3:44
13. "A Place in Time" – 1:58
14. "Hearing Aid" (bonus track) – 3:03

== Personnel ==
- Marty Gregori – vocals, guitar
- Angelo Celli – guitar, vocals
- Zack Charlos – bass, vocals
- Ray Castro – drums
- Fat Mike – guitar on "No Brainer"
- Ryan Greene – producer, engineer, mixer
- Bracket – producer
- Adam Krammer – engineer, mixer
- Ramón Brentón – mastering (Ocean View Digital Mastering)
- Rick Hines – photography
- Brian Archer – photography
- Tobias Jeg – photography
