= Mild in the Streets: Fat Music Unplugged =

Compilation album by Fat Wreck Chords
- Released: July 1, 2016
- Genre: Acoustic punk
- Length: 63:51
- Label: Fat Wreck Chords (FAT 956)
- Compiler: Fat Mike

Fat Music chronology
Going Nowhere Fat (2015)	Mild in the Streets: Fat Music Unplugged (2016)

Mild in the Streets: Fat Music Unplugged is a compilation album released July 1, 2016 by Fat Wreck Chords as the ninth volume in the label's Fat Music series. When it was released, five of the tracks were previously unreleased. The album contains acoustic songs by punk rock bands or punk musicians, of which most are signed with Fat Wreck Chords. The title and cover art are a reference to Wild in the Streets by the Circle Jerks.

== Track listing ==
No.	Title	Artist	Length
1.	"Under the Garden"	Tony Sly (No Use for a Name)	3:16
2.	"Fruitless Fortunes"	Swingin' Utters	2:52
3.	"Everything Is Beautiful" (Previously unreleased)	Stacey Dee (Bad Cop/Bad Cop)	2:01
4.	"Heroinsomnia"	Sam Sadowski (Closet Fiends)	2:52
5.	"Care of Me"	Morning Glory	3:16
6.	"Guts 'n' Teeth"	Old Man Markley	2:56
7.	"1 Trillion Dollars"	Anti-Flag	2:27
8.	"State is Burning" (Previously unreleased)	Yotam Ben Horin (Useless ID)	2:25
9.	"Continental" (Previously unreleased)	Matt Skiba (Alkaline Trio)	3:29
10.	"Musée Mécanique"	Karina Deniké (Dance Hall Crashers)	3:14
11.	"This One's for Johnny"	Get Dead	3:17
12.	"We're Not in Love Anymore"	Joey Cape (Lagwagon)	2:58
13.	"Hurtlin'"	American Steel	2:08
14.	"Joy"	Against Me!	1:36
15.	"Seven Hours" (Previously unreleased)	Russ Rankin (Good Riddance)	2:35
16.	"Xanadu" (Previously unreleased)	Uke-Hunt	3:01
17.	"NOFX's The Decline (A Punk Rock Symphony)" (Bonus track)	Baz and His Orchestra	19:28
