= Going Nowhere Fat =

Compilation album by Fat Wreck Chords
- Released: August 7, 2015
- Genre: Punk death
- Length: 65:38
- Label: Fat Wreck Chords (FAT 949)
- Compiler: Fat Mike

Fat Music chronology
Harder, Fatter + Louder! (2013)	Going Nowhere Fat (2015)	Mild in the Streets: Fat Music Unplugged (2016)

Going Nowhere Fat is a compilation album released August 7, 2015 by Fat Wreck Chords as the eighth volume in the label's Fat Music series. When it was released, six of the tracks were previously unreleased. Three of them, the tracks by PEARS, Leftöver Crack and Night Birds, were later released on an album or single, leaving three, the tracks by NOFX, Swingin' Utters and Western Addiction, unavailable anywhere else.

== Track listing ==
No.	Title	Artist	Length
1.	"Modern Shakes" (from Souvenir)	Banner Pilot	2:31
2.	"The Most Beautiful Girl" (from M.I.)	Masked Intruder	1:54
3.	"The Cog in the Machine" (from Hang)	Lagwagon	3:47
4.	"Snowflake" (from Letters to Memaw 7")	PEARS	5:06
5.	"Shoot Out the Lights" (from Dirty Rice)	Mad Caddies	3:20
6.	"Straight Up" (from Are We Not Men? We Are Diva!)	Me First & The Gimme Gimmes	2:59
7.	"When It Was Over" (from In This Mess)	toyGuitar	2:07
8.	"Welcome to Hell" (from Bad News)	Get Dead	2:40
9.	"One More Chance" (from Last Chance to Dance)	C.J. Ramone	1:52
10.	"Running on Fumes" (from Peace in Our Time)	Good Riddance	2:35
11.	"Left in the Middle" (from Mutiny at Muscle Beach)	Night Birds	2:55
12.	"Good Enough" (from See the Light)	Less Than Jake	2:50
13.	"Rats in the Walls" (from Transmission.Alpha.Delta)	Strung Out	3:18
14.	"Bury Me" (from Dead Language)	The Flatliners	2:54
15.	"Fond Of, Lost To" (from Sisu)	Darius Koski	2:29
16.	"The Lie of Luck" (from Constructs of the State)	Leftöver Crack	3:28
17.	"Nightmare" (from Not Sorry)	Bad Cop/Bad Cop	2:12
18.	"Stupid Today" (from "Stupid Today" 7")	Old Man Markley	2:14
19.	"Life's a Long Revenge" (from Poets Were My Heroes)	Morning Glory	2:07
20.	"SF Clits (demo version)" (Previously unreleased)	NOFX	2:03
21.	"In the Stocks" (from 5-4-3-2-1 - Perhaps? )	Snuff	2:52
22.	"Taking On the Stale Green Light" (Previously unreleased outtake from Poorly Formed)	Swingin' Utters	1:53
23.	"Ex-Humans" (Previously unreleased outtake from Cognicide)	Western Addiction	2:20
24.	"Up on a Motorbike" (from Rats in the Burlap)	The Real McKenzies	2:02
25.	"Monsters" (from Home Street Home: Original Songs from the (S)hit Musical)	Home Street Home	4:09
