= Rocks Your Lame Ass =

...Rocks Your Lame Ass

Studio album by Hagfish
- Released: June 27, 1995
- Recorded: November 1, 1994 to December 3, 1994 at The Blasting Room in Fort Collins, Colorado
- Genres: Punk rock, alternative rock
- Length: 29:20
- Label: London Records
- Producers: Bill Stevenson, Stephen Egerton

Hagfish chronology
Buick Men (1993)	...Rocks Your Lame Ass (1995)	Hagfish (1998)

Professional ratings
Review scores
Source	Rating
AllMusic	4.5/5 stars
Entertainment Weekly	(B−)
Punknews.org	4.5/5 stars

...Rocks Your Lame Ass is the second studio album by the American rock band Hagfish, released in June 1995 on London Records. The album was recorded and produced by Bill Stevenson and Stephen Egerton at The Blasting Room in Fort Collins, Colorado in 1994. Backed by the singles "Stamp" and "Happiness", which also included music videos that were featured on MTV's 120 Minutes, Rocks Your Lame Ass would go on to become the group's most successful effort. The album rights were later acquired by UMG when they purchased London Records.

== Track listing ==
All songs written by George Stroud Reagan III except where noted.

1. "Happiness" – 2:08
2. "Stamp" – 2:19
3. "Flat" – 2:09
4. "Bullet" (Reagan, Michael Gardner) – 2:36
5. "Crater" – 1:15
6. "Minit Maid" (Reagan, Zach Blair) – 1:26
7. "White Food" (Z. Blair) – 0:52
8. "Disappointed" (Reagan, Doni Blair) – 2:28
9. "Plain" – 2:25
10. "Buster" – 2:21
11. "Trixie" (Reagan, D. Blair) – 2:29
12. "Did You Notice" – 2:01
13. "Gertrude" (Reagan, Z. Blair) – 2:22
14. "Hose" – 2:30

== Personnel ==
- George Stroud Reagan III – lead vocals
- Zach Blair – guitar, backing vocals
- Doni Blair – bass guitar
- Tony Barsotti – drums, backing vocals

Additional personnel

- Bill Stevenson – producer, mixer, engineer
- Stephen Egerton – producer, mixer, engineer
- Howie Weinberg – mastering engineer
- Karl Alvarez – backing vocal assistance
- Jon Snodgrass – backing vocal assistance
- Amos T. Ache – art direction, layout design
- Joby Cummings – 'Fighting Hagfish' logo
- Marina Chavez – photography
