= To the Nines (Only Crime album) =

Studio album by Only Crime
- Released: July 12, 2004
- Recorded: February 2004; The Blasting Room, Fort Collins, Colorado, USA
- Genre: Melodic hardcore
- Length: 28:12
- Label: Fat Wreck Chords
- Producer: Bill Stevenson, Jason Livermore

Only Crime chronology
| To the Nines (2004) | Virulence (2007) |

Professional ratings
Review scores
| Source | Rating |
|---|---|
| Punknews | link |

To The Nines is the first album by melodic hardcore band Only Crime. It was released by Fat Wreck Chords on July 13, 2004, and features Good Riddance's Russ Rankin, Bane's Aaron Dalbec, and renowned drummer and producer, Bill Stevenson, of Black Flag and Descendents fame. It also features Doni and Zach Blair, brothers who made up half the band Hagfish.

== Track listing ==
All music written by Only Crime, all lyrics by Russ Rankin

1. "R.J.R." – 2:04
2. "Sedated" – 2:32
3. "Doomsday Breach" – 2:08
4. "Pray for Me" – 2:36
5. "To the Nines" – 2:57
6. "Real Enemy" – 2:24
7. "Tenebrae" – 2:23
8. "Virus" – 2:37
9. "The Well" – 2:36
10. "On Time" – 3:10
11. "Fallen Idols" – 2:41

== Credits ==
- Russ Rankin – vocals
- Zach Blair – guitar
- Aaron Dalbec – guitar
- Doni Blair – bass
- Bill Stevenson – drums
- Recorded in February, 2004 at The Blasting Room, Fort Collins, Colorado
- Produced, engineered, mixed, and mastered by Bill Stevenson and Jason Livermore
- Additional engineering by Andrew Berlin and Brian Kephart
