= Protect: A Benefit for the National Association to Protect Children =

Compilation album by Fat Wreck Chords
- Released: 18 October 2005
- Recorded: 2002–2005
- Genre: Punk rock
- Length: 1:12:02
- Label: Fat Wreck Chords

Fat Wreck Chords chronology
Rock Against Bush, Vol. 2 (2004)	Protect: A Benefit for the National Association to Protect Children (2005)	Wrecktrospective (2009)

Professional ratings
Review scores
Source	Rating
Allmusic	3/5 stars

PROTECT: A Benefit for the National Association to Protect Children is a charity record for the child protection organization, Protect. It was released by Fat Wreck Chords record label in 2005.

PROTECT contains tracks by various punk rock and hardcore punk artists, 15 of which are previously unreleased. Fat Wreck Chords publicist Vanessa Burt and Verbicide Magazine publisher Jackson Ellis created the project, with the help of the head of Fat Wreck, Fat Mike.

Every band on the album donated the songs, including all royalties, to Protect.

== Track listing ==
1. "Demons Away" - Matt Skiba (of Alkaline Trio) - 3:06
2. "Broken Heart's Disease" - MxPx - 2:26
3. "Indecision" - Smoke or Fire - 2:33
4. "Leaving Jesusland" - NOFX - 2:53
5. "Mouth Breather" (The Jesus Lizard cover) - Coalesce - 2:18
6. "Building the Perfect Asshole Parade or Scratching Off the Fleas" - The Falcon - 2:31
7. "March 22nd Is National Quit Your Job Day" - The Tim Version - 2:19
8. "Minus" - Joey Cape (of Lagwagon & Bad Astronaut) - 3:11
9. "Carrie Anne" - Communiqué - 4:02
10. "Cause of My Anger" - Dead To Me - 2:36
11. "Sound the Surrender" - Darkest Hour - 3:42
12. "Middle of the Night" - The Soviettes - 2:15
13. "Radio K" - The Ergs - 1:50
14. "Feminism Is For Everybody (With a Beating Heart and a Functioning Brain)" - Anti-Flag - 1:18
15. "Misery Loves Company" - Grabass Charlestons - 2:17
16. "Idle Idylist" - Tim Barry (of Avail) - 3:25
17. "Failure" - The Arrivals - 2:01
18. "Up To My Neck" - BARS - 2:12
19. "So Far Away" - Teenage Bottlerocket - 3:37
20. "Want" (Live) - Jawbreaker - 3:22
21. "Collision" - Rusty Pistachio (of H_{2}O) - 3:44
22. "Jenny" - The Mishaps - 2:29
23. "Refrain of the A.M." - The Lovekill - 2:39
24. "Tacoma" - Hot Cross - 3:46
25. "When a Good Friend Attacks" - Western Addiction - 1:49
26. "Wagon Wheel" (Old Crow Medicine Show cover) - Laura Jane Grace (of Against Me!) - 3:40

== See also ==
- Fat Wreck Chords compilations
