= The Punk Group =

US musical group

- Also known as: "Sex Object" and "The Model"
- Origin: Portland, Oregon
- Years active: 2002–Present
- Labels: Reload Records

The Punk Group was an electro/synth-rock band originating from Portland, Oregon.

== Background ==
The group began in 2002 "as a joke" and consists of two human members, Brian Applegate and Summer Cameron, who dub themselves and "Sex Object" and "The Model" after song titles by the German electronic band Kraftwerk. All the band's albums are self-released. Critics cite the band's 1980s musical influences, particularly Devo.

== Style ==
The Punk Group frequently criticize pop culture and other artists in their songs and are known for their politically incorrect lyrics. Their live shows consists of the two members who sing and play guitar, bass, or synthesizer, and are known to wear assorted costumes, white sunglasses, and augmented by a drum machine.

== Touring ==
Although the band rarely played outside of Portland Oregon, they did embark on a European tour in the summer of 2007 and Australia in 2008. The Punk Group played their final Portland show at Dante's in May 2010 before relocating to Oakland and Seattle, respectively. In 2012, they opened for Devo on numerous dates in California and performed an unofficial reunion at Dante's in August 2018.

== Discography ==
- International Rock Stars (2003)
- Tour De Force (2003)
- Video Games (2005)
- Rock Off and Fuck On (2005)
- The Basement Tapes Vol. 1 (2006)
- The Basement Tapes Vol. 2 (2006)
- Make a Rainbow With Your Hands (2007)
- Sex, Drum Machines & Rock 'n Roll (2008)
- Self Titled (2009)
- Difficult Listening (2010)
- Pink Foam (2010)
- Fruition (2015)

== Tribute album ==
- Shower Time! A Tribute to the Punk Group (2009)

== DVD ==
- The Punk Group from Outer Space (2007)

== Equipment ==
- Allen & Heath ZED 428 mixing console
- Behringer B-2 condenser microphone
- Boss VT-1 vocal transformer
- Boss DR-5 drum machine
- Boss DR-880 drum machine
- Boss ME-80 guitar effects
- DBX DDP rack mount digital dynamic processor
- Elektron Machinedrum drum machine
- Fender 4 string electric guitar
- Fender bass guitar
- Korg Kaossilator
- Korg MS2000 synthesizer
- Lexicon effects processor
- Line 6 pods
- Logic
- Moog Voyager synthesizer
- Moog Sub Phatty synthesizer
- Moog minimoog model D reissue
- Moog Mother 32
- Moog DFAM
- Moog Grandmother synthesizer
- Nord G-2 synthesizer
- Omnichord
- Pro Tools
- RAT distortion pedal
- Reason
- Roland Jupiter 6 synthesizer
- Roland Juno 60 synthesizer
- Roland U-20 keyboard
- Roland TR-08 (808 reissue) drum machine
- Roland VT-3 voice transformer
- Shure SM-57 microphones
