= Epoxies =

American new wave band

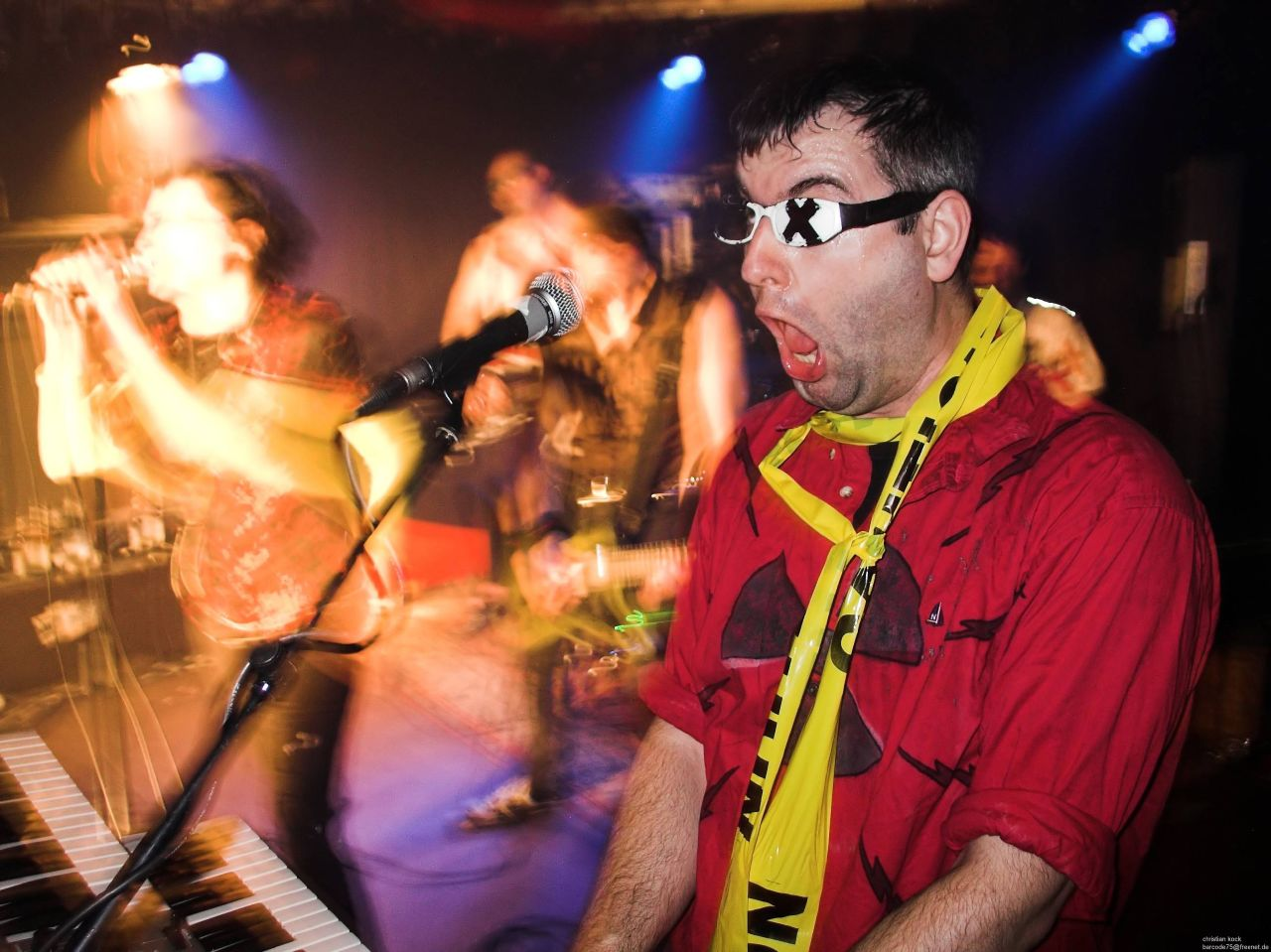
- The Epoxies playing in Münster, (Germany) on March 10, 2007. FM Static in the foreground.

Background information
- Origin: Portland, Oregon, United States
- Genres: New wave, synthpunk
- Years active: 2000–2007
- Labels: Metropolis, Fat Wreck Chords, Dirtnap
- Members: Fritz M. Static; Viz Spectrum; Roxy Epoxy; Shock Diode; Ray Cathode
- Past members: Kid Polymer; R/X Grip (or Dr. Grip)

The Epoxies were an American new wave band from Portland, Oregon, formed in 2000. Heavily influenced by new wave, the band jokingly described themselves as robot garage rock. Members included FM Static on synthesizers, guitarist Viz Spectrum, lead singer Roxy Epoxy, bass guitarist Shock Diode, and drummer Ray Cathode. They grew in popularity due in large part to extensive touring in both the United States and Europe where they showcased frantically paced, highly energetic on-stage productions. They were known for using special effects for their live act and sporting home-made costumes, sometimes made mostly of duct tape.

The group's music is a novel synthesis of punk rock and new wave but their lyrics are strictly focused on science fiction themes, Atomic Age futurism, alienation and consumerism. Robots, androids, clones and nuclear weapons all figure prominently in the Epoxies' lyrics.

== History ==
=== Inception (2000–2002) ===
Members of the Epoxies had been involved with punk bands in the Portland area since the mid-1990s. Most notably, FM played with and Roxy photographed many album covers for The Automatics. FM and Viz conceived of a band wearing spray-painted refrigerator boxes and dryer hose as home-made robot costumes. This soon gave way to less restrictive (but generally just as low budget) costumes as the impracticality of wearing a box and playing a guitar became apparent. Kid Polymer soon took up the bass guitar when FM and Viz finally decided to go ahead with the idea. Dr. Grip and Roxy were the last to join the band in 2000, completing their first line-up. Surprisingly, this was the first time Roxy had considered being in a band. They were first known as the Adhesives before discovering that another group with that name existed nearby.

In September 2001, the Epoxies released their first recording on Dirtnap Records, based in Seattle at the time. The self-titled 7" vinyl contained the tracks "Need More Time", "Molded Plastic" and a cover version of "Beat My Guest" by Adam and the Ants. This was the start of a longstanding association with the Pacific Northwest label and several other bands on it at the time such as The Briefs and The Spits.

=== Increasing popularity (2002–2006) ===
The first recording formed the basis for a full-length album that followed in March 2002 with extensive West Coast tours to support it. Between the release of their first album and August that year Kid Polymer left the band and was replaced on bass guitar by Shock Diode, who has the fictional persona of a clone.

The band released a 7" single, "Synthesised", in October 2003, with a B-side cover version of Alice Cooper's "Clones (We're All)". Before their first US tour at the end of the year, the Epoxies also began making a CD EP to sell at shows that collected their previous 7" releases. Soon after the tour Dr. Grip decided to leave the band and was replaced by Ray Cathode, who claims to be a clone much like Shock Diode.

The Epoxies continued to tour the United States in 2003 and 2004 often opening for the Groovie Ghoulies. The group also toured Europe for the first time in 2004 with NOFX. "Need More Time" was released again the following year on Fat Wreck Chords' Rock Against Bush compilation.

This inclusion led the Epoxies to sign with Fat Wreck Chords for their second album, Stop the Future, released in April 2005, which included a cover version of the Scorpions' "Robot Man". It showcased more of the short, fast songs that fans had come to expect while also showing a more down-tempo and melodic style with the ending track "Toys" (their first song to last longer than 4:30).

They spent most of 2005 and 2006 touring with similarly pseudonymed bands The Aquabats and The Phenomenauts; Fat Wreck Chords label-mates Smoke or Fire, The Soviettes and Against Me!, and fellow pop-punkers Teenage Bottlerocket.

During this tour, the band re-recorded the single "Synthesised" in the fictional Simlish language for the release of The Sims 2: Open for Business computer game in 2006.

=== Break up and later work ===
The Epoxies signed with Metropolis Records in June 2007 and released an EP in August entitled My New World. Posts to the Metropolis website indicate that they planned an album to follow later in the year. However, in a MySpace blog interview on March 17, 2008, Roxy confirmed rumors that the Epoxies were probably broken up, or at least on an extended hiatus.

Lead vocalist Roxy Epoxy began hosting a radio show broadcast on Portland State University's campus radio station in April 2007, and fronted the new wave/pop rock band Roxy Epoxy and the Rebound. They released their first CD, Band Aids on Bullet Holes, in March 2009 on Metropolis Records, and underwent a national tour supporting TheStart the same month. As a solo artist, Roxy Epoxy released in 2010 a 5-tracks EP called 1000 with the avant-garde French record label Rotorelief. In 2016, Roxy moved back to her home state of Massachusetts to attend the 2-year MBA program at F.W. Olin School of Business at Babson College. She wrote and recorded a new album of material with Chris Pierce from Groucho Marxists and Doc Hopper at his studio, Volume IV, located in New Brunswick, NJ. Faux Replika's debut album "Presenting!" was released in January 2020 on Rad Girlfriend Records. The full line up has yet to play live due to COVID precautions.

FM Static went on to briefly tour as a guitarist (under the name "Fritz M. Static") for the Oakland-based "Rocket Roll" band The Phenomenauts. He continued to be their touring keyboardist, playing on several national and international tours, through 2014. Since 2010, he also plays bass in the new wave punk band The Bloodtypes, who have toured both nationally and internationally and released an album and an EP. FM Static has also started his own synth punk one man show entitled Static and the Cubes.

Ryan (Shock Diode) appeared on Cecilia and the Sauerkrauts' full-length album Sauerkraut, Wurst Und Other Delights. He then founded the synth punk band Sex Crime together with his wife Cecilia (No-Talents / Operation S) as well as former Epoxies drummer Tim (Ray Cathode). Sex Crime has released three 7" (on Danger Records, No Front Teeth Records and Jonny Cat Records) and one full-length album on Danger Records.

Meanwhile, Tim (Ray Cathode) has also helped to form a new band in Portland called The Bourbonettes who appeared on Shower Time! A Tribute to The Punk Group. The band then renamed itself to Suicide Notes and still performs under that moniker. They have released two singles and one full length on Dead Beat Records to date.

On May 29, 2010, the Epoxies reunited for a one-off performance at a local benefit show in Portland. Perhaps confirming the group's permanent dissolution, FM Static announced to the audience before the show began to "go nuts now cause [a reunion] ain't gonna fucking happen again!".

April 14, 2015, Roxy Epoxy posted on her Twitter about a show, fuelling speculation that the Epoxies had reformed. This was then confirmed via a Tweet on April 16, 2015 stating that The Epoxies would be playing a show with the Spits at Dante's in Portland for the Project Pabst Music Festival on July 18, 2015. The show sold out well before the performance and saw the Epoxies return to the stage with their old swagger and allure.

== Musical style ==
The Epoxies started as a reaction to popular rock music at the time. The original members felt that the entertainment and stage performance aspects of popular music were being ignored and it is this sentiment that results in their characteristic energetic shows and flamboyant homemade costumes. Ox-Fanzine critic Joachim Hiller wrote that the Epoxies "draw on influences from the early eighties, when Joy Division and New Order, OMD and Kim Wilde, X-Ray Spex and Blondie broke away from harsh punk sounds and moved towards pop."

As part of rebelling against established musical conventions, the band chose to include a synthesizer; they "had the intent of offending people with it because it's such an uncool instrument." However, with the rise of synthesizers in popular music since, the Epoxies are often compared to acts such as The Bravery and The Killers, leading the band to wonder if they are not accomplishing their objectives by being "overly cool" instead. One of the synthsizers FM often used was a monophonic Roland SH-101 keytar.

Viz used a futuristic looking Epiphone Explorer that had been repainted and modified to contain a laser and a bank of LEDs.

== Discography ==
=== as The Epoxies ===
==== Studio albums ====
- 2002 Epoxies
- 2005 Stop the Future

==== Extended plays ====
- 2001 Epoxies
- 2007 My New World

==== Singles ====
Year	Title	Album/EP
2005	"Synthesized"	Stop the Future

==== Music videos ====
- "Stop Looking at Me" (2002)
- "Need More Time" (2002)
- "Molded Plastic" (2002)
- "You" (2002)
- "Synthesized" (2005)

=== as Roxy Epoxy/Roxy Epoxy and the Rebound ===
==== Studio albums ====
- Band Aids on Bullet Holes (2009) – Metropolis Records

==== Extended plays ====
- 1000 (EP) (2010) – Rotorelief
  1. 1000
  2. Dark Dance
  3. Move Your Lips
  4. What's There Left
  5. Bad Stars
