= Dragon Street Records =

American independent record label

Dragon Street Records is an independent record label, based out of Dallas, Texas. Founded in 1989 by David Dennard and Patrick Keel, longtime local musicians with over 25 combined years of music experience, Dragon Street's original goal was to develop regional rock bands into nationally viable recording artists, and, in general, promoting the Texas music scene. The first major bands to be released through Dragon Street were The Bat Mastersons, Hagfish, The Nixons, and Tripping Daisy.

By 1995, major labels had come to dominate the alternative rock scene, and Dennard began refocusing the label on alternative country and rockabilly music, giving starts to artists including Ronnie Dawson, Killbilly, the Dixie Chicks, and Gene Summers, as well as older artists including Jim Reeves and Joe Poovey.

In addition to the continuing development of local acts, Dragon Street is issuing a series of recordings centering on 1960s and 1970s Dallas bands.

== See also ==
- List of record labels
