= E Is for Everything on Fat Wreck Chords =

Compilation album by Bracket
- Released: November 19, 1996
- Recorded: 1994–1996
- Genre: Punk rock, power pop, pop punk
- Length: 27:07
- Label: Fat Wreck Chords
- Producer: Bracket, Joe Marquez

Bracket chronology
4-Wheel Vibe (1995)	E Is for Everything on Fat Wreck Chords (1996)	Novelty Forever (1997)

Professional ratings
Review scores
Source	Rating
Allmusic	2.5/5 stars

E Is for Everything on Fat Wreck Chords is a compilation EP^{[1]} from Californian punk rock band Bracket. It was released on November 19, 1996, through Fat Wreck Chords and consists of earlier EPs released on the label back as far as 1994. The album cover parodied the debut release from NOFX.

E Is for Everything... included the five songs from F is for Fat, released earlier that year. Those tracks were originally intended to be part of Like You Know, the bands scheduled third album for Caroline Records. Also included are the three songs from Stinky Fingers released in 1994. Despite the "everything" indicated in the title, the release is missing "Homesick" from 1995's For Those About to Mock. Also excluded are the two songs from Bs. which had previously appeared on 924 Forestville St. in 1994. An early version of "My Stepson" was included as a hidden track on the band's second album, 4-Wheel Vibe.

== Track listing ==
All songs written and composed by Bracket.

1. "Hermit" – 4:00
2. "2RAK005" – 2:33
3. "Speed Bump" – 3:43
4. "WWF" – 2:03
5. "Talk Show" – 2:45
6. "Flea Market" – 2:49
7. "Eating Pie" – 3:15
8. "My Stepson" – 1:26
9. "Envy" – 4:11
10. "Warren's Song, Pt. 3" – 0:22
- Tracks 1, 3, 6, 7 and 9 previously released on F is for Fat (1996)
- Tracks 5 and 8 previously released on For Those About to Mock (1995)
- Tracks 2, 4 and 10 previously released on Stinky Fingers (1994)

== Personnel ==
- Marty Gregori – vocals, guitar
- Larry Tinney – guitar, vocals
- Zack Charlos – bass, vocals
- Ray Castro – drums
- Joe Marquez – producer
- Bracket – producer
- Ryan Greene – mixer
