= 4-Wheel Vibe =

Studio album by Bracket
- Released: May 16, 1995
- Genres: Punk rock; power pop; pop punk
- Length: 45:01
- Label: Caroline
- Producer: Don Fleming

Bracket chronology
924 Forestville St. (1994)	4-Wheel Vibe (1995)	4 Rare Vibes (1996)

Professional ratings
Review scores
Source	Rating
AllMusic	4.5/5 stars

4-Wheel Vibe is the second album by American punk rock band Bracket, released by Caroline Records on May 16, 1995. Produced by Don Fleming, 4-Wheel Vibe expanded on the pop punk sound of their debut 924 Forestville St. and began to showcase a wider range of songwriting. In addition to music videos for "Trailer Park" and "Circus Act", leftover songs from the album's sessions were released the following year on the 4 Rare Vibes EP. Bracket released alternate versions of several tracks from 4-Wheel Vibe on Rare Cuts in 2013.

== Track listing ==
All songs written and composed by Bracket.

1. "Circus Act" – 3:43
2. "Cool Aide" – 3:32
3. "Happy to Be Sad" – 1:53
4. "John Wilke's Isolation Booth" – 2:46
5. "Tractor" – 2:47
6. "Green Apples" – 2:02
7. "Closed Captioned" – 3:47
8. "Trailer Park" – 3:07
9. "Fresh Air" – 2:29
10. "P.C." – 2:50
11. "G-Vibe" – 2:07
12. "Warren's Song, Pt. 4" – 2:51
13. "2 Hot Dogs for 99¢" – 1:50
14. "Metal" – 1:27
15. "Pessimist" – 2:11
16. "Lazy" – 5:31 (includes "My Stepson" as a hidden track)

== Personnel ==
- Marty Gregori – lead vocals, guitars
- Larry Tinney – guitars
- Zack Charlos – bass guitar, backing vocals
- Ray Castro – drums
- Don Fleming – producer, lead guitar on "John Wilke's Isolation Booth"
- Joe Marquez – engineer, piano on "Lazy"
- Troy Hahn – photography
- Bracket – design concept
- Tom Bejgowicz – art direction, layout
- Catharine Clune – violin on "Lazy"
- Matt Brubeck – cello on "Lazy"
