= The Frisk =

American punk rock band

- Origin: Berkeley, California, United States
- Genres: Punk rock
- Years active: 2000–2005
- Labels: Adeline Records
- Members: Jesse Luscious; Zac Hunter; Mike Sexxx; Hunter Burgan
- Website: thefrisk.com

The Frisk was an American punk rock band from Berkeley, California, formed by Jesse Luscious, Mike Sexxx and Zach Attack, all former members of The Criminals, along with AFI member Hunter Burgan, following The Criminals 2000 breakup. The Frisk issued two releases on Adeline Records before playing their final show in 2005.

== History ==
The Frisk arose in early 2000, when the dissolution of The Criminals caused vocalist Jesse Luscious, bassist Mike Sexxx and guitarist Zach Attack to pursue drummer Hunter Burgan. For the former members of The Criminals, The Frisk proved to be a quick transition from their previous band together, while for Burgan the band would become an outlet in addition to his role as bassist for AFI, with whom he had been a member since 1997. Following the band's first show, Zach Attack departed, with Zac Hunter of The Nerve Agents, taking his place on guitar.

In February 2001, The Frisk entered Nu-Tone Studios in Pittsburg, California to record what would become Rank Restraint, the bands' debut for Adeline Records, who had previously issued releases by both AFI and The Criminals. The primary songwriters were Luscious and Burgan, although "Leech" was co-written with Jesse Michaels. The recording would feature "Know Your Rights", a song originally performed by The Clash. Following release, Mike Sexxx left The Frisk and was later replaced by bassist Hardcore Dan that fall. The band's show scheduling became more sporadic as Burgans time was further occupied with AFI, supporting The Art of Drowning with several world tours. This caused The Frisk to acquire an additional drummer, Luke Swarm of Envain, for shows and touring when Burgan was unavailable.

However, in the spring of 2003 The Frisk recorded their follow up, Audio Ransom Note, and released it on October 14 on Adeline Records. Like the band's previous release, most song writing credits would go to Luscious and Burgan. The album featured "East Coast Funeral", a song written by Mike Sexxx, originally released on The Criminals posthumous EP Extinct in 2001. Audio Ransom Note was supported by shows that included appearances with the Dwarves, followed by several shows supporting Rancid, with Tiger Army and Nekromantix. In November, The Frisk embarked on a month-long US tour that featured numerous dates with Naked Aggression. In early 2004 the band completed a West Coast tour with Subhumans. Following the tour, Hardcore Dan was replaced with bassist Matt.

According to a March 15, 2004 post on the band's official website, The Frisk started work on a new album, although due to the band members other commitments, this was put on hold. Luscious ran for office under his given name Jesse Townley for Berkeley City Council, while during the campaign his bandmates stayed busy with their other projects. Burgan was once again touring with AFI, who released their major label breakthrough album Sing the Sorrow the previous year. Zac Hunter was focusing his attention on his new band Shadowboxer.

These scheduling conflicts would eventually culminate in the breakup of The Frisk, yet the band managed to book two final shows in late 2005, when original bassist Mike Sexxx returned to resurrect the lineup from Rank Restraint. On November 25, 2005 The Frisk made their final Berkeley performance, appearing with Propagandhi at 924 Gilman Street, followed by their last show ever on December 2, 2005 at Burnt Ramen in Richmond, California with The Briefs and Thought Riot.

== Members ==
- Jesse Luscious – lead vocals
- Zac Hunter – guitar
- Mike Sexxx – bass
- Hunter Burgan – drums

Former members

- "Zach Attack" Brewer – guitar
- "Hardcore Dan" Kelly – bass
- Matt Habegger – bass

Touring members

- Luke Swarm – drums

== Discography ==
=== Albums ===
- Rank Restraint (2001)
- Audio Ransom Note (2003)

=== Compilation appearances ===
- Every Dog Will Have Its Day (2001)
- Dropping Food on Their Heads Is Not Enough (2002)
- Rock Against Bush, Vol. 1 (2004)
- This Just In... Benefit for Indy Media (2005)
