= Zach Blair =

American guitarist

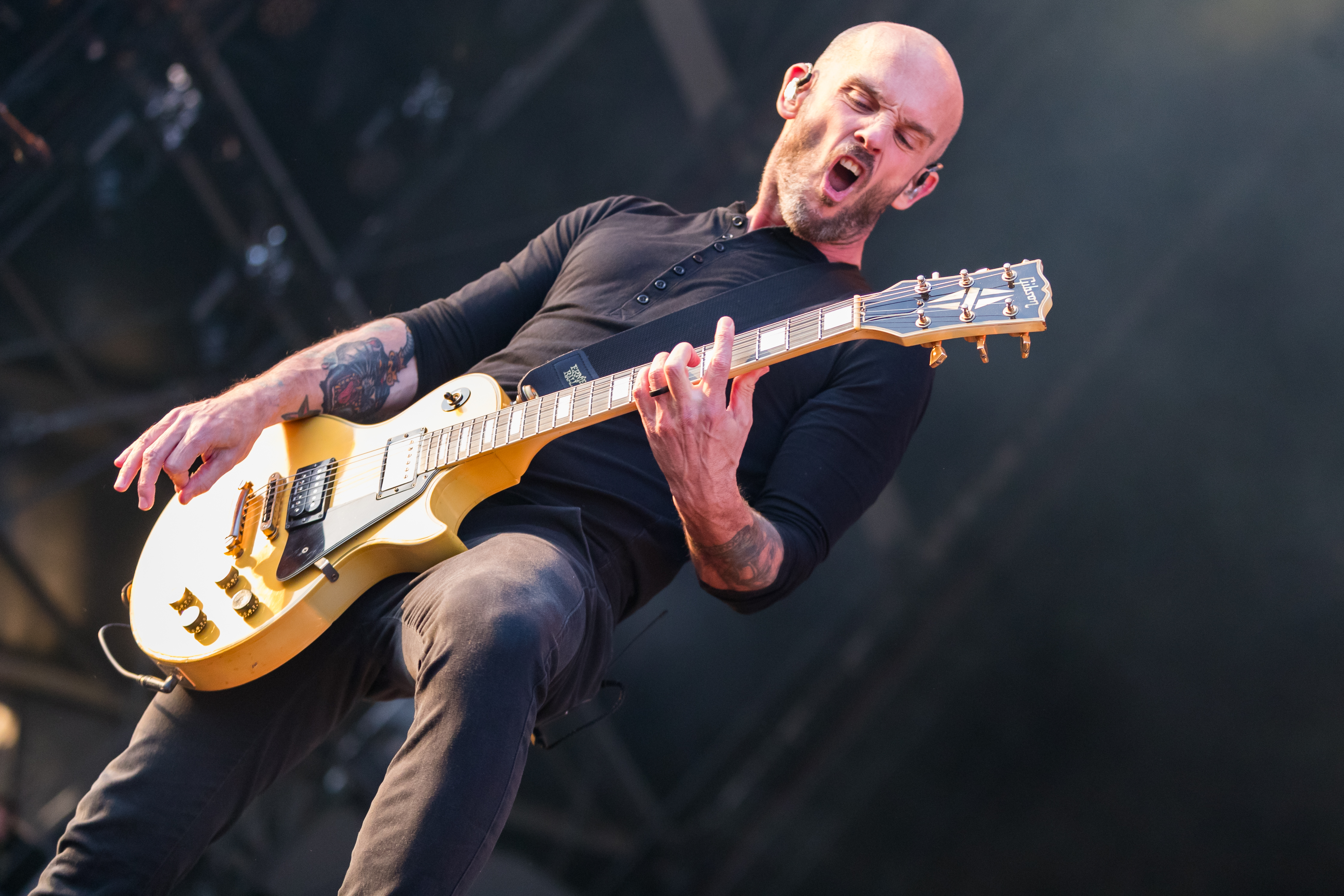
- Blair with Rise Against in 2023

Background information
- Born: December 26, 1974 (age 51); Sherman, Texas, U.S.
- Genres: Melodic hardcore; punk rock; hardcore punk; heavy metal
- Occupation: Guitarist
- Years active: 1991–present
- Website: riseagainst.com

Zach Blair (born December 26, 1974) is an American musician, best known as the lead guitarist and backing vocalist for Chicago-based punk rock band Rise Against. He has been with the band since 2008, first appearing on their fifth studio album Appeal to Reason, and has appeared on every album since.

Before joining Rise Against in early 2007, Blair was a member of melodic hardcore group Only Crime along with his brother, Doni Blair, who currently plays with the Toadies. The brothers were founding members of the bands Hagfish and Armstrong. Blair was also Flattus Maximus of Gwar from 1999 to 2002. He made a return to Gwar as Splattus Maximus on the 2013 album Battle Maximus. He has also been a second touring guitarist for The Loved Ones and was second guitarist on the instrumental band The Mag Seven's album The Future Is Ours, If You Can Count.

As of early 2015, Blair has taken part in playing guitar for the punk band Drakulas alongside members of The Riverboat Gamblers. Zach also joined Punk supergroup Vanishing Life in 2016 and released one album with them.

Blair currently resides in Austin, Texas with his wife.

== Equipment ==
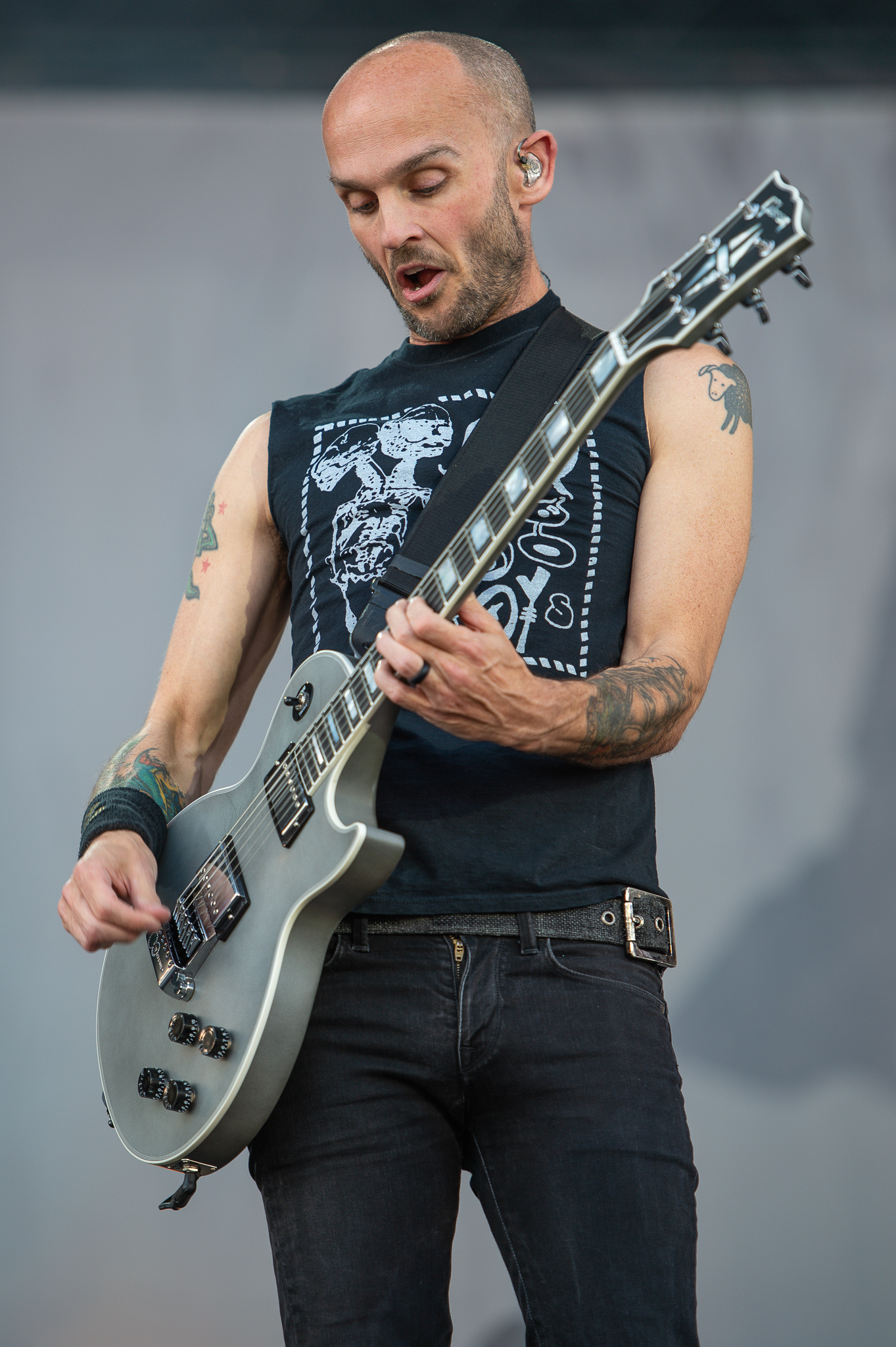
Blair with Rise Against in 2018

Guitars

- Gibson Les Paul Custom (Black). Custom made for Blair by Gibson. Single humbucker (bridge), single knob (volume) and toggle switch middle and neck position made into kill switch
- Gibson Les Paul Classic (Black) w/Seymour Duncan JB pickups (with Motörhead symbol)
- Gibson Les Paul Goldtop Reissue (Chambered Body) w/Seymour Duncan Distortion Pickups
- Gibson Les Paul Standard (Black) w/ Seymour Duncan JB Pickups
- Gibson SG Standard (Black) w/ Seymour Duncan Distortion Pickups
- Gibson Les Paul '68 Custom (Black) w/ Seymour Duncan JB Pickups, without Pick-guard. (White)

Amps and Cabinets

- Marshall JCM900 4100 100watt Hi Gain Dual Reverb amp head (with 5881 Tubes)
- Mesa Boogie 4x12 Recto Cab with Celestion Vintage 30 speakers
- Mesa Boogie custom built Road Ready Cab with Celestion Vintage 30 speakers

Effects and More

- Boss TU-2 pedal
- Lehle P-Split A/B/Y splitter
- Boss NS-2 pedal
- Line 6 Echo Park pedal
- Rivera Channel Switcher
- Furman Power Conditioner
- Shure ULX Wireless Receivers
- Voodoo Lab Pedal Power 2 Plus

Strings and Picks

- Ernie Ball Coated Slinky guitar strings (10-46 gauged)
- Ernie Ball Hybrids .10 - .52
- Dunlop Tortex Standard Guitar Picks (.50 .60 .73 .88)

== Discography ==
With Hagfish

- Buick Men (1993)
- Rocks Your Lame Ass (1995)
- Hagfish (1998)
- Caught Live (1999)
- That was Then, This is Then (2001)

With Gwar

- You're All Worthless and Weak (2000)
- Violence Has Arrived (2001)
- Battle Maximus (2013)

With Armstrong

- Dick, the Lion-Hearted (2002)

With Only Crime

- To the Nines (2004)
- Virulence (2007)

With Vanishing Life

- Surveillance (2016)

With The Mag Seven

- The Future is Ours, If You Can Count (2006)

With Rise Against

See also: Rise Against discography
- Appeal to Reason (2008)
- Endgame (2011)
- The Black Market (2014)
- Wolves (2017)
- Nowhere Generation (2021)
- Nowhere Generation II (2022)
- Ricochet (2025)
