= Thought Riot =

American hardcore punk rock band

- Origin: California
- Genre: Hardcore punk rock
- Years active: 1997–2006
- Label: A-F Records
- Past members: Marc Riot Bryan Jones Ben Harrison Kelley Dangerously Robby Goodson

Thought Riot was an American hardcore punk band from California's Central Valley. The band lyrics focused on progressive political ideas. The writings of philosopher Friedrich Nietzsche are cited and often paraphrased in the band's lyrics.

== History ==
=== Prior to A-F Records signing ===
Thought Riot was formed in June 1997, originally consisting of Marc riot (guitar/vocals), Bryan Jones (bass), and Ben Harrison (drums). After playing a number of shows, Josh and Mike were added to the lineup. Josh added a second guitar and additional vocals, while Mike took over bass duties. Bryan shifted to vocals and Marc to guitar only. In 1998, Bryan left the band, and Marc reprised his role as lead vocalist while still playing guitar. This lineup would record a six-song demo entitled "Our Six Best Takes." Shortly after recording, Ben left the band, followed by Josh.

Through 1999, the band had very little activity, but Marc and Mike continued to write lyrics and compositions. In 2000, Kelley Dangerously was added to the band's roster, playing guitar. Brian and Brad also joined in 2000, playing guitar and drums, respectively. The same year, the band recorded and released a demo EP entitled "Bright Dreams For A Dark World."

=== A-F Records signing to 2006 ===
In March 2001, Thought Riot signed to A-F Records. In October of the same year, the band's first LP, Shattered Mirror Syndrome was recorded. The album would be released March 19, 2002. The release was followed by the band's participation of A-F Records/Fat Wreck Chords "Mobilize for Peace—" East Coast tour. In addition to Thought Riot, the tour included Anti-Flag, Good Riddance, The Code, Pipedown and Strike Anywhere. In the same year, Brian and Brad both left the band, and Adam Parker (drums) and Bryan Harrison (guitar) join. The band continued to tour in Oregon and Washington, as well as participating in the Southwest Tour 2002 with Scattered Fall.

In 2003, the 7 inch "The Dangerous Doctrine Of Empathy" was recorded and released by Record Labelation. In May, the band's second LP was recorded at Art of Ears, followed by extensive touring, including Anti-Flag's The Terror State CD release tour. Sketches Of Undying Will would be released on November 18, 2003.

From 2004 to 2006, Thought Riot toured virtually non-stop. Bryan left the band in February 2004 and was replaced by Robby Goodson. In May of the same year, Adam left the band due to tendon and nerve damage in his arm, and was replaced by Paul Baker. The band then toured extensively, including participating in Warped Tour. Thought Riot toured California for a period in 2006. Paul has since left the band. Kelley stated on the band's MySpace page that many songs have been written but not recorded, or have been recorded but not released. She has also stated the band will continue to play some local shows.

Thought Riot disbanded in October 2006.

== Members ==
- Marc Riot - lead vocals (1997 - 2006/2007 and now a teacher)
- Mike - bass (1997–2006/2007)
- Kelley Dangerously - guitar, vocals (2000 - 2006/2007)
- Robby Goodson - guitar, vocals (2004–2006/2007)
- Chad - drums (? - 2006/2007)
- Ben Harrison [Drums] (1997–1998)
- Bryan Jones [Bass, vocals] (1997–1998)
- Josh Miller [Guitar, vocals] (1997–1998)
- Brian Stark [Guitar] (2000–2002)
- Brad Stark [Drums] (2000–2002)
- Bryan Harrison [Guitar, vocals] (2002–2004)
- Adam Parker [Drums, vocals] (2002–2004)
- Paul Baker of Troubador [Drums] (2004–2006)

== Discography ==
=== Shattered Mirror Syndrome ===
Released March 19, 2002.
1. Breaking Old Tablets
2. All For God, And A Gun For All
3. Save The Humans
4. Encomienda
5. Sign Of The Times
6. American Deity
7. Patriot
8. Not Our Property
9. On Friends And Mistakes
10. Black Watch
11. Duality Of The Revolutionary
12. Pillow Over The Face As Therapy
13. Struggle

=== The Dangerous Doctrine of Empathy E.P. ===
1. Dangerous Doctrine of Empathy
2. Sepsis: Part One
3. Burning Too (Fugazi Cover)
4. The Plague (Redemption 87 Cover)

=== Sketches Of Undying Will ===
Released November 18, 2003.
1. With Love, The Underground
2. You're Gonna Die
3. Glenview
4. On New Tablets
5. Homeland Insecurities
6. The Hermit Of Sils Maria
7. Cycle Of The Streets
8. Hard Words
9. I Voted For Nader
10. A Song In Response To...
11. Ink Soaked Pages
12. Walking Stick For The Weak
