= Fat Music =

Compilation album series

Fat Music is a series of eight compilation albums published by Fat Wreck Chords since 1994. The albums include artists from the label's roster, focusing on then-current and upcoming releases and often including previously unreleased material. In total the series includes 127 songs contributed by 49 different artists, focusing stylistically on punk rock and various subgenres such as hardcore punk, pop punk, ska punk, skate punk, and street punk. The Fat Music series tapered off after its sixth installment as the label moved from compact discs toward digital downloads for its samplers instead. Subsequent physical compilation albums released by Fat Wreck Chords were themed around social and political causes, including the benefit albums Liberation (2003) and Protect (2005), and the two volumes of Rock Against Bush released preceding the 2004 United States presidential election. In 2010 the Fat Music series was revived with the release of a seventh volume, Harder, Fatter + Louder!

== Discography ==
- Fat Music for Fat People (1994)
- Survival of the Fattest (1996)
- Physical Fatness (1997)
- Life in the Fat Lane (1999)
- Live Fat, Die Young (2001)
- Uncontrollable Fatulence (2002)
- Harder, Fatter + Louder! (2010)
- Going Nowhere Fat (2015)
- Mild in the Streets: Fat Music Unplugged (2016)

== Artists ==
A total of 49 artists have contributed songs to the Fat Music compilation series. Good Riddance, No Use for a Name, NOFX, and Strung Out are the only acts to have appeared on all seven volumes. Lagwagon have appeared on six installments and have contributed the most tracks to the series, with a total of eight songs.

Contributing artists included:

- 88 Fingers Louie
- Against Me!
- American Steel
- Anti-Flag
- The Ataris
- Avail
- Banner Pilot
- Bracket
- Chixdiggit!
- Cobra Skulls
- Consumed
- Dead to Me
- The Dickies
- Diesel Boy
- Dillinger Four
- Fabulous Disaster
- Face to Face
- The Flatliners
- Frenzal Rhomb
- Goober Patrol
- Good Riddance
- Guns 'N' Wankers
- Hi-Standard
- Lagwagon
- The Lawrence Arms
- Less Than Jake
- Mad Caddies
- Me First and the Gimme Gimmes
- NOFX
- None More Black
- No Use for a Name
- Old Man Markley
- Pour Habit
- Propagandhi
- Rancid
- The Real McKenzies
- Rise Against
- Screeching Weasel
- Screw 32
- Sick of It All
- Tony Sly
- Smoke or Fire
- Snuff
- Strung Out
- Swingin' Utters
- Teenage Bottlerocket
- Tilt
- Wizo
- Zero Down

== See also ==
- List of punk compilation albums
