= Fat Wreck Chords =

American independent record label

- Parent company: Hopeless Records
- Founded: 1990; 36 years ago
- Founder: Fat Mike; Erin Burkett
- Distributors: The Orchard (US); PIAS (Europe); eOne Music (worldwide)
- Genre: Punk rock
- Country of origin: United States
- Location: San Francisco, California
- Official website: fatwreck.com

Fat Wreck Chords (pronounced "Fat Records") is an independent record label based in San Francisco focused on punk rock. It was started by NOFX lead singer Michael Burkett (better known as Fat Mike) and his wife at the time, Erin Burkett in 1990. As of 2009, Fat Wreck Chords released over 300 studio albums.

== History ==
Fat Mike started his record label Wassail Records in 1987. He put out two NOFX records, The PMRC 7" in 1987 and Liberal Animation in 1988. In 1990, he and his wife Erin Burkett co-founded Fat Wreck Chords, and re-released NOFX's 1987 EP, The P.M.R.C Can Suck on This. In 1992, Fat Mike went on to produce Lagwagon, Propagandhi, and No Use for a Name. In 1993, the label released records by Rancid, Face to Face, and Strung Out.

The label grew during the 1990s selling over a million records per year. It had 18 employees and four offices. A documentary about Fat Wreck Chords called A Fat Wreck was released on October 25, 2016.

In 2025, the back catalog and operations of the record label were sold to Hopeless Records, with Fat Mike and Erin retaining ownership of the trademarks which are licensed to Hopeless for physical and digital releases.

== Imprints ==
The label has had two subsidiaries over the years, Honest Don's and Pink and Black. Honest Don's released records from Chixdiggit and Teen Idols amongst others, while Pink & Black released albums from female-fronted bands like Fabulous Disaster and Dance Hall Crashers.

Fat Mike advanced $50,000 to Chris Hannah and Jord Samolesky of Propagandhi which he recouped within months from sales of Propagandhi records to help them start up their own label, G7 Welcoming Committee, though G7WC is independent from Fat Wreck.

== Discography ==
=== Compilation albums ===
Fat Wreck Chords regularly releases compilation albums, often to promote bands signed to the label, but also, since 2003, to raise funds for various charities. The earliest Fat Wreck Chords compilations have titles with some reference to fatness.

Shortly after Fat Music Volume IV was released, Fat Wreck Chords released a similarly titled album, Short Music for Short People, which features 101 songs, all averaging approximately 30 seconds. The shortest song ("Short Attention Span" by the Fizzy Bangers) is only eight seconds, and the longest ("Out of Hand" by Bad Religion) is 40 seconds. Some of the songs were commissioned and recorded specifically for the album, while others were from the bands' pre-existing repertoires.

Since the last Fat Music album has been released, the Fat Wreck Chords compilations have been explicitly for charitable causes. Liberation: Songs to Benefit PETA is a benefit album for the animal rights organization PETA, and PROTECT: A Benefit for the National Association to Protect Children is a benefit album for the children's rights group PROTECT. Between Liberation and PROTECT, two other compilation albums were released in protest of President George W. Bush and his administration: Rock Against Bush, Vol. 1 and Vol. 2. To celebrate 20 years of business Fat Wreck Chords released the 3-disc Wrecktrospective compilation on December 8, 2009. Disc 1 is composed of the label's greatest hits, disc 2 is composed of unreleased demos and rarities, and disc 3 is composed the Fat Club 7" series in its entirety.

=== Album series ===
==== Live in a Dive ====
Live in a Dive is a series of live albums recorded by Fat Wreck Chords. In order of release:

Title	Artist	Release date
Live in a Dive	No Use for a Name	September 11, 2001
Live in a Dive	Bracket	February 26, 2002
Live in a Dive	Sick of It All	August 13, 2002
Live in a Dive	Strung Out	June 22, 2003
Live in a Dive	Subhumans	February 10, 2004
Live in a Dive	Swingin' Utters	June 29, 2004
Live in a Dive	Lagwagon	February 8, 2005
Ribbed: Live in a Dive	NOFX	August 3, 2018
Live in a Dive	Face to Face	October 18, 2019
Live in a Dive	Rich Kids on LSD	June 3, 2022

=== Fat Club Series ===
In addition to the Live in a Dive series, Fat Wreck Chords also released the Fat Club series of 7" vinyl records during 2001. The series was only available to mail-order subscribers which received one single every month. Fat Wreck Chords did not publish any information on the upcoming releases so subscribers would not know what they were about to receive until the record arrived in the post.

Although the Fat club series was limited to 1,300 copies for each single, the songs contained on the records were later released as the third disc of the Wrecktrospective collection.

== Artists ==
=== Current bands ===
- Against Me!
- American Steel
- Bad Astronaut
- Bad Cop/Bad Cop
- Banner Pilot
- The Bombpops
- Bracket
- Chixdiggit!
- Cigar
- Clowns
- The Copyrights
- C.J. Ramone
- Dance Hall Crashers
- Darius Koski
- Days N' Daze
- Dead to Me
- Dillinger Four
- Direct Hit
- Dizzy Sunfist
- Escape from the Zoo
- Face To Face
- Frenzal Rhomb
- Get Dead
- Good Riddance
- Hi-Standard
- Joey Cape
- Lagwagon
- The Last Gang
- The Lillingtons
- MakeWar
- Me First and the Gimme Gimmes
- Mean Jeans
- Nerf Herder
- Night Birds
- PEARS
- The Real McKenzies
- Rich Kids on LSD (Live in a Dive only)
- Sick of It All (in North America, Century Media Records in Europe)
- Snuff
- Strung Out
- Sundowner
- Swingin' Utters
- Tommy and June
- ToyGuitar
- Uke-Hunt
- Useless ID
- Western Addiction
- Zach Quinn

=== Former bands ===
- 88 Fingers Louie
- Anti-Flag (disbanded)
- The Ataris (one-time release for the follow up album in 1999)
- Avail
- Big In Japan
- Bullet Treatment
- Citizen Fish
- Cobra Skulls
- Consumed
- Descendents
- The Dickies
- Diesel Boy
- Epoxies (disbanded)
- The Fight (disbanded)
- The Flatliners
- Goober Patrol
- Guns n' Wankers
- Inspection 12
- Leftöver Crack
- Less Than Jake (active on Pure Noise Records)
- The Lawrence Arms (active on Epitaph Records)
- The Loved Ones
- Love Equals Death (active on SBÄM Records)
- Mad Caddies (active on SBÄM Records)
- MDC
- Masked Intruder (active on Pure Noise Records)
- Morning Glory
- MxPx (one-time EP release)
- Night Birds (disbanded)
- NOFX (disbanded)
- No Use for a Name (disbanded)
- None More Black
- Old Man Markley
- Only Crime
- One Man Army (disbanded)
- Paint It Black (active on Revelation Records)
- Pour Habit
- Propagandhi (active on Epitaph Records)
- Rancid (active on Hellcat Records)
- Rise Against (active on Loma Vista Recordings)
- Riverdales
- The Sainte Catherines
- Screeching Weasel
- Screw 32
- Shay Colston and the Couch Collectors
- Smoke or Fire (active on Iodine Recordings)
- The Soviettes (disbanded)
- Star Fucking Hipsters
- Strike Anywhere
- Subhumans
- Teenage Bottlerocket (active on Pirates Press Records)
- The Suicide Machines (active on Bad Time Records)
- The Vandals (Active on Kung Fu Records)
- Tilt
- Tony Sly
- Wizo
- Zero Down (disbanded)

== See also ==
- List of record labels
