= Hang (Lagwagon album) =

Studio album by Lagwagon
- Released: October 28, 2014
- Recorded: 2014
- Genres: Punk rock; skate punk
- Length: 38:51
- Label: Fat Wreck Chords
- Producers: Joey Cape; Bill Stevenson; Angus Cooke; Thom Flowers

Lagwagon chronology
I Think My Older Brother Used to Listen to Lagwagon (2008)	Hang (2014)	Railer (2019)

Professional ratings
Review scores
Source	Rating
AllMusic	4/5 stars
Hit The Floor	4.5/5 stars
Punknews.org	4/5 stars
PopMatters	7/10

Hang is the eighth studio album by American punk rock band Lagwagon, released on October 28, 2014, on Fat Wreck Chords. It is their first in 9 years, following 2005's Resolve and their first to feature bassist Joe Raposo, who replaced at the time former member Jesse Buglione. The song "Drag" was originally released in 2011 in an acoustic version on frontman Joey Cape's solo album Doesn't Play Well with Others. In February and March 2015, the band performed at Soundwave festival in Australia.

== Track listing ==
No.	Title	Length
1.	"Burden of Proof"	0:56
2.	"Reign"	3:21
3.	"Made of Broken Parts"	2:20
4.	"The Cog in the Machine"	3:38
5.	"Poison in the Well"	2:33
6.	"Obsolete Absolute"	6:11
7.	"Western Settlements"	3:07
8.	"Burning Out in Style"	2:55
9.	"One More Song"	3:18
10.	"Drag"	2:19
11.	"You Know Me"	4:17
12.	"In Your Wake"	3:55
Total length:		38:51

Bonus tracks
No.	Title	Length
13.	"Don't Laugh at Me" (Peter, Paul and Mary cover)	4:00
14.	"Exit" (No Use for a Name cover)	3:22
Total length:		45:31

== Personnel ==
- Joey Cape – vocals
- Chris Flippin – guitar
- Chris Rest – guitar
- Dave Raun – drums
- Joe Raposo – bass
