= I Remember When I Was Pretty =

Studio album by The Playing Favorites
- Released: December 4, 2007
- Recorded: 2007
- Genre: Indie rock
- Label: Suburban Home
- Producer: Joey Cape, The Playing Favorites

I Remember When I Was Pretty is the debut album of American indie rock band The Playing Favorites, which features members of Lagwagon, Sugarcult, Summercamp, Bad Astronaut and Popsicko. The album was released on December 4, 2007, via Suburban Home Records.

== Track listing ==
1. "Leavingtown" (3:39)
2. "Everyone Else in The World" (2:33)
3. "Good Years" (3:13)
4. "Waiting" (4:42)
5. "This Is the Last Train" (2:45)
6. "Spill My Guts" (4:28)
7. "Futuring" (1:33)
8. "Indigenous" (3:25)
9. "Drug Hugger" (3:30)
10. "Stay" (2:21)
11. "Whole Lotta Nothin'" (2:59)
12. "The Problems Last" (3:28)
13. "Wasteland" (2:18)
14. "Citizen's Band" (4:57)

== Personnel ==
- Joey Cape - guitar, vocals, keyboards, percussion
- Mick Flowers - drums, percussion
- Marko DeSantis - bass, vocals, guitar
- Luke Tierney - guitar, vocals, bass, keyboards
- Tim Cullen - guitar, vocals, bass, keyboards, percussion
