= Joey Cape's Bad Loud (album) =

Studio album by Joey Cape's Bad Loud
- Released: June 9, 2011
- Recorded: March–April 2011 at the Blasting Room, Fort Collins, Colorado
- Genre: Alternative rock, punk rock
- Length: 35:42
- Producer: Bill Stevenson, Joey Cape, Andrew Berlin, Jason Livermore

Joey Cape's Bad Loud chronology
Joey Cape's Bad Loud	...

Joey Cape's Bad Loud is the self-titled debut album by the band of the same name, led by Californian punk rock musician Joey Cape, frontman of Lagwagon and Bad Astronaut, released on June 9, 2011.

The album features electric full-band renditions of acoustic songs originally released on Joey Cape's two solo acoustic albums: Bridge and Doesn't Play Well with Others. It was recorded at the Blasting Room in Fort Collins, Colorado with producers Bill Stevenson, Jason Livermore and Andrew Berlin, who have previously worked with Cape on various Lagwagon albums.

== Track listing ==
No.	Title	Length
1.	"Canoe"	2:29
2.	"Going for the Bronze"	4:19
3.	"Okay"	2:54
4.	"Montreal"	3:33
5.	"Who We've Become"	3:22
6.	"The Greatest Generation"	3:46
7.	"It's Always Sunny"	3:13
8.	"The Fish Rots from the Head Case Down"	2:41
9.	"I'm Not Gonna Save You"	2:41
10.	"Uniform"	3:41
11.	"A Song for the Missing"	2:57

== Personnel ==
Joey Cape's Bad Loud

- Joey Cape - lead vocals, guitar, production
- Carl Raether - bass
- Asher Simon - drums, percussion

Additional personnel

- Chad Price - additional vocals
- Jon Snodgrass - additional vocals
- Brian Wahlstom - keyboards
- Angus Cooke - cello

Production

- Bill Stevenson - production
- Jason Livermore - production, mixing, engineering
- Andrew Berlin - production
