= Joey Cape's Bad Loud =

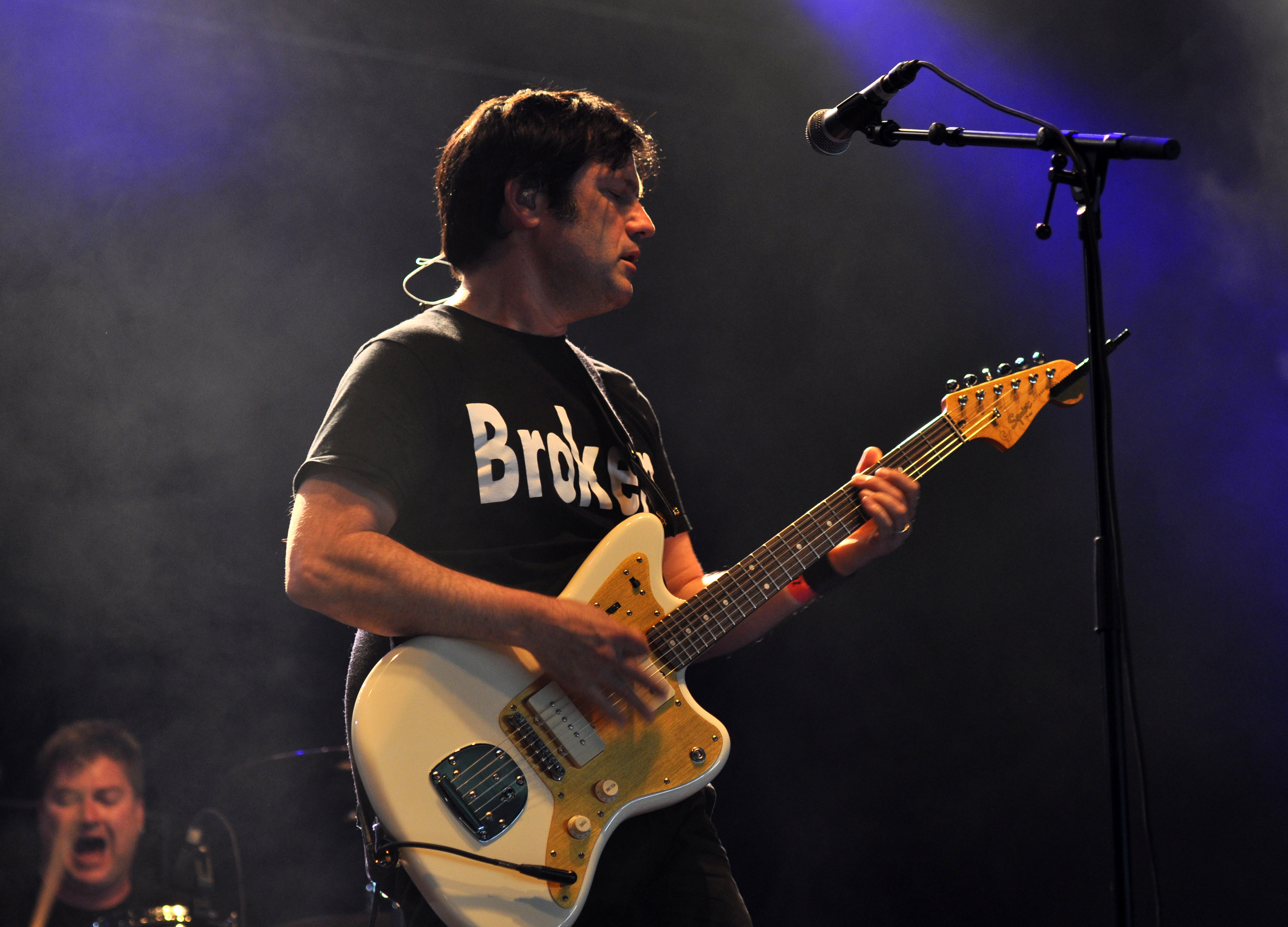
- Joey Cape with Joey Cape's Bad Loud at Groezrock 2013

Background information
- Origin: Goleta, California, United States
- Genres: Alternative rock, punk rock, indie rock
- Years active: 2011–present
- Members: Joey Cape; Carl Raether; Asher Simon

Joey Cape's Bad Loud is an American alternative music project that was started in 2011 by punk rock singer Joey Cape, frontman of California punk bands Lagwagon and Bad Astronaut. The band's debut self-titled album was released on June 9, 2011.

== History ==
Rumors about Cape working on a new full-band project started in January 2011, when Cape hinted about a possibility of re-recording some songs from his second solo album Doesn't Play Well with Others in an electric full-band form for a yet unnamed new project, not being Lagwagon or Bad Astronaut.

On April 25, 2011, Cape has revealed that he is indeed working on a new band project called Joey Cape's Bad Loud and that he already recorded a full-length album with the band, to feature electric full-band renditions of acoustic songs from his two solo albums Bridge and Doesn't Play Well with Others. As opposed to his main bands, the band's sound is more alternative/indie rock, closer to the indie sound Cape has embraced on his solo albums. It was revealed that the trio recorded the album between March–April 2011 at the Blasting Room in Fort Collins, Colorado with producers Bill Stevenson, Jason Livermore and Andrew Berlin. The band's debut self-titled album was released on June 9, 2011, on BandCamp.

Cape has revealed that the band is working already on a new album, to feature original material written by the whole band, as opposed to the debut album featuring re-recordings of previously released acoustic solo songs by Cape.

== Band members ==
Current members

- Joey Cape – lead vocals, guitar (2011–present)
- Carl Raether – bass (2011–present)
- Asher Simon – drums, percussion (2011–present)

== Discography ==
- Joey Cape's Bad Loud (2011)
