= The Playing Favorites =

American indie rock band

- Origin: Santa Barbara, California
- Genres: Indie rock
- Years active: 2007–
- Members: Joey Cape; Luke Tierney; Tim Cullen; Marko DeSantis; Mick Flowers

The Playing Favorites is an American indie rock band, working as a side project of several punk rock band members. The band members are Joey Cape (Me First and the Gimme Gimmes, Lagwagon, Bad Astronaut), Luke Tierney (The Penfifteen Club, Silver Jet), Tim Cullen (Summercamp), Marko DeSantis (Sugarcult, Bad Astronaut, The Lapdancers) and Mick Flowers (Popsicko, The Rentals, The Lapdancers). The band originates from Santa Barbara, CA.

The band's debut album, I Remember When I Was Pretty, was released in 2007. The songs were recorded in a period of 5 days.

== Discography ==
=== Studio albums ===
Date of Release	Title	Label
4 December 2007	I Remember When I Was Pretty	Suburban Home Records

=== EP's ===
Date of Release	Title	Label
TBA	The Ramones Are Dead	Suburban Home Records
