= Double Plaidinum =

Studio album by Lagwagon
- Released: August 12, 1997
- Recorded: 1996–1997
- Genres: Melodic hardcore; skate punk
- Length: 31:10
- Label: Fat Wreck Chords
- Producers: Joey Cape, Angus Cooke, Ryan Greene, Ken Stringfellow

Lagwagon chronology
Hoss (1995)	Double Plaidinum (1997)	Let's Talk About Feelings (1998)

Double Plaidinum is the fourth album by Lagwagon, released in 1997. It was their first album without the original line-up, as guitarist Shawn Dewey and drummer Derrick Plourde left the band before the recording sessions began. Ken Stringfellow of the Posies joined the band as temporary guitarist to record the album; his other commitments led to him being replaced for the album tour by Chris Rest, who joined the band on a permanent basis.

== Critical reception ==
Professional ratings
Review scores
Source	Rating
AllMusic	3/5 stars
Pitchfork	6.5/10.0
Punknews.org	3.5/5 stars
The San Diego Union-Tribune	2.5/4 stars

The San Diego Union-Tribune wrote that "melody is in the driver's seat throughout the Santa Barbara quintet's fourth album, on which the standouts include the propulsive 'Confession', the breakneck 'Bad Scene', and the snappy 'Choke'."

== Track listing ==
All tracks are written by Lagwagon.

No.	Title	Length
1.	"Alien 8"	1:50
2.	"Making Friends"	2:15
3.	"Unfurnished"	3:15
4.	"One Thing to Live"	1:28
5.	"Today"	2:04
6.	"Confession"	2:52
7.	"Bad Scene"	1:17
8.	"Smile"	2:05
9.	"Twenty-Seven"	2:29
10.	"Choke"	2:45
11.	"Failure"	2:45
12.	"To All My Friends"	3:15
13.	"Goodbye / Untitled (Note: In some editions, this song is a part of "To All My Friends" and not a separate track.)"	2:45
Total length:		31:10

== Personnel ==
- Joey Cape - Vocals, Producer, Synthesizer
- Chris Flippin - Guitar
- Jesse Buglione - Bass Guitar
- Dave Raun - Percussion, Drums
- Ken Stringfellow - Guitar
- Angus Cooke - Producer, Engineer
- Joe Gastwirt - Mastering
- Ryan Greene - Producer, Engineer, Mixing

== Charts ==
Album - Billboard (United States)

Year	Chart	Position
1997	Heatseekers	20
