= Railer (album) =

Studio album by Lagwagon
- Released: October 4, 2019
- Studios: Maple, Santa Ana, California
- Genre: Skate punk
- Length: 35:50
- Label: Fat Wreck Chords
- Producer: Cameron Webb

Lagwagon chronology
| Hang (2014) | Railer (2019) |

Professional ratings
Review scores
| Source | Rating |
|---|---|
| Discovered Magazine | 7.5/10 stars |
| Distorted Sound Magazine | 8/10 stars |
| Punk Rock Theory | 8/10 stars |
| Sputnikmusic | 4.3/5 |

Railer is the ninth studio album by American skate punk band Lagwagon, released on 4 October 2019 by Fat Wreck Chords on CD and LP. It was their first studio album in five years since Hang, which was released in 2014.

== Background ==
The album was announced on 29 July 2019, and a new song of the album called "Bubble" was released. A tour with Face to Face to support the upcoming album was simultaneously announced. A second song, called "Surviving California", was released on 4 September. A music video for this song was released in November 2019. The entire album was made available for streaming on 2 October, before being released two days later.

== Track listing ==
All songs are written by Joey Cape, unless noted otherwise.

1. "Stealing Light" - 2:35
2. "Surviving California" (Joe Raposo/Joey Cape) - 2:51
3. "Jini" - 2:53
4. "Parable" - 2:59
5. "Dangerous Animal" - 2:21
6. "Bubble" - 3:25
7. "The Suffering" - 4:34
8. "Dark Matter" - 2:37
9. "Fan Fiction" - 3:25
10. "Pray for Them" - 2:53
11. "Auf Wiedersehen" - 2:38
12. "Faithfully" (Jonathan Cain) (Journey cover) - 2:45

== Performers ==
- Joey Cape – vocals
- Chris Flippin – guitar
- Chris Rest – guitar
- Dave Raun – drums
- Joe Raposo – bass

== Charts ==
| Chart (2019) | Peak position |
|---|---|
| US Independent Albums (Billboard) | 12 |
