= Blaze (Lagwagon album) =

Studio album by Lagwagon
- Released: April 8, 2003
- Recorded: November 2002
- Genre: Punk rock, skate punk, melodic hardcore
- Length: 41:48
- Label: Fat Wreck Chords
- Producer: Joey Cape

Lagwagon chronology
Let's Talk About Leftovers (2000)	Blaze (2003)	Resolve (2005)

"Blaze" is the sixth studio album by American punk rock band Lagwagon, which was released in 2003.

== Background and recording ==
Lagwagon recorded with Ryan Greene in March 2002. While on the 2002 Warped Tour, the band handed out promo samplers that included two songs from the album, "Dinner and a Movie" and "Never Stops". In September, the band were writing material for their next album, which they spent November recording.

The album marked their first studio release in the five years since Let's Talk About Feelings. The absence was due to frontman Joey Cape being involved with band projects like Bad Astronaut and Me First and the Gimme Gimmes. Lagwagon did not completely disband during that time, and briefly reunited in 2002.

== Release ==
On December 25, 2002, Blaze was announced for release in April 2003. On March 17, 2003, the album's artwork and track listing was posted online. Two days later, "Falling Apart" was posted on the label's website. Blaze was released on April 8, 2003, through Fat Wreck Chords. In April and May 2003, the band embarked on a headlining US tour, with Avoid One Thing and Yellowcard. On May 31 and June 1, the band held one-off shows that were recorded as part of the Live in a Dive series. In August and September, the band toured across Europe, which included appearances at the Reading and Leeds Festivals, and four shows as part of the Reconstruction Festival.

== Reception ==
Professional ratings
Review scores
Source	Rating
AllMusic	4.5/5 stars

It was the first Lagwagon album to rank on the Billboard 200, reaching #172.

== Track listing ==
All songs written by Joey Cape and Jesse Buglione, except where noted.

1. "Burn" - 3:15
2. "E Dagger" - 2:09
3. "Dancing the Collapse" - 2:16
4. "I Must Be Hateful" - 3:30
5. "Falling Apart" (Cape, Buglione, Chris Rest) - 2:39
6. "Max Says" - 3:22
7. "Billy Club" - 2:48
8. "Dividers" - 2:43
9. "Never Stops" - 3:34
10. "Dinner and a Movie" - 2:04
11. "Lullaby" - 3:49
12. "Billionaire" - 2:30
13. "Tomorrow Is Heartbreak" - 3:00
14. "Baggage" - 4:08

This album contains 2 live videos from the Warped Tour 2002 and the music video for "Falling Apart" as enhanced content.

== Personnel ==
- Joey Cape – vocals
- Chris Flippin – guitar
- Chris Rest – guitar
- Dave Raun – drums
- Jesse Buglione – bass
