= It's a Beautiful Feeling =

1984 extended play by Rich Kids on LSD

EP by Rich Kids on LSD
- Released: 1984
- Recorded: Mystic Studios, Hollywood
- Genre: Hardcore punk
- Label: Mystic Records
- Producer: Doug Moody

Rich Kids on LSD chronology
It's a Beautiful Feeling (1984)	Keep Laughing (1985)

It's a Beautiful Feeling is an EP by hardcore punk band Rich Kids on LSD, released in 1984. It was produced by Doug Moody at Mystic Studios in Hollywood. It has been described as "Great" and a "hardcore gem" and has been noted for the metal-influenced guitar work.

== Track listing ==
All tracks are written by RKL.

Side one
No.	Title	Length
1.	"Political Destruction"	1:03
2.	"Not Guilty"	1:43
3.	"Adolescent Death"	1:45
4.	"Beautiful Feeling"	1:49

Side two
No.	Title	Length
1.	"Why?"	1:39
2.	"Tell Me The Truth"	1:14
3.	"I'm Locked Up"	1:29

== Personnel ==
- Jason Sears - Vocals
- Chris Rest - Guitar
- Vince Peppars - Bass
- Bomer Manzullo - Drums
