= Rich Kids on LSD =

American hardcore punk band

- Promo shot from Epitaph Records circa 1994. From left: Barry Ward, Dave Raun, Jason Sears, Chris Rest, Joe Raposo.

Background information
- Origin: Montecito, California, USA
- Genres: Punk rock; skate punk; crossover thrash; hardcore punk; nardcore
- Years active: 1982–1989; 1992–1996; 2002–2006; 2024–present
- Labels: Mystic; Alchemy; Destiny; Epitaph; Malt Soda
- Members: Chris Rest; Barry "D'live" Ward; Dave Raun; Joe Raposo; Abe Brennan
- Past members: Tony Foresta; Jason Sears; Richard "Bomer" Manzullo; Vince Peppars; Alan "Alpo" Duncan; Derrick Plourde; Chris Flippin; Boz Rivera; Rick Bowersock

Rich Kids on LSD (RKL) is an American hardcore punk band formed in 1982 in Montecito, California, a suburb of Santa Barbara. Closely associated with the nardcore scene that developed in nearby Oxnard, RKL's music evolved from fast, raw hardcore into a technically skilled blend of punk, rock, and metal influences. Their musicianship and energetic live shows earned them a strong following, particularly among European skaters during the 1980s and 1990s. Guitarist Chris Rest remained the band's only consistent member throughout its various lineups.

== History ==
=== Formative years ===
The members of RKL began playing together at a young age. Guitarist Chris Rest and drummer Bomer Manzullo (sometimes credited as "Bomber") initially recruited Joey Cape as a second guitarist, but Cape agreed to join only if Jason Sears could be the vocalist. Rest already knew Sears from elementary school and youth soccer. Cape was frequently grounded during this period and was eventually left out of the band.

RKL soon began performing around the Santa Barbara area, undergoing several changes at second guitar and bass before the lineup stabilized with Allen "Alpo" Duncan on second guitar and Vincent Peppars on bass. According to Rest, "Bomer soon started writing the majority of the music."

Actor Josh Brolin claimed in a New York Times interview to have been a member of RKL. He later gave more detail about this in a radio interview, stating "Things have gotten confused in interviews and all that. And I said that I was a part of RKL, which is Rich Kids on LSD, which was a big punk band back then. And it was - I was part of the garage band that first started playing. And then they went to be known with other drummers and other musicians as RKL. And they actually became a fairly well-known punk rock band.". On WTF with Marc Maron he said Jason Sears was his best friend and has also stated "Rich Kids on LSD was the band that I helped start."

==== Band name and logo origin ====
The group's name came about as a mere fluke from some light hearted criticism. According to vocalist Jason Sears in a 2002 interview with Thrasher magazine: “it happened that some guy said, 'ha, those kids will never be anything, they're just a bunch of rich kids on LSD, man.' The first party we played we didn't have a name for the band, so we put that one on the flier and it just stuck.” The beanie boy logo was born one night while Bomer and Jason were being tattooed. Bomer was attempting to draw a dragon pattern. On seeing the drawing, Jason commented, "Yeah dude, it's Cecil! Where's Beanie?" Dan Sites was sitting alongside drawing a flyer for a show supporting Suicidal Tendencies in Oxnard and drew a beanie guy jumping from a building. Beanie boy was born.

=== Signing with Mystic Records ===
Though not actually from the Oxnard area, RKL was still considered part of the Nardcore punk movement from Oxnard, California due to their close proximity to Oxnard and hardcore style. RKL recorded It's a Beautiful Feeling EP on Mystic Records, released in 1984. It is a 7-song release that included concert mainstays "Why", "Tell Me The Truth", and "Beautiful Feeling". Outside the studio while waiting for the rest of his bandmates to arrive, Bomer had a skateboarding accident that looked to be a broken wrist. Doug Moody, owner and operator of Mystic Records, duct taped his wrist then taped the drumstick to his hand so he could complete the session. All the artwork for the EP was done by Dan Sites marking the first official appearance of the popular "beanie boy" character, which would remain an icon for RKL for their entire career. RKL would play around California, and particularly enjoyed the scene in San Francisco, driving 6 hours to play shows and drive back. Eventually they decided to move there, minus Alpo. He did not wish to leave Santa Barbara. His position would remain empty for some time. After about five months Vince Peppars wanted to move back to Santa Barbara. Sears said:"...so we hooked up with Barry to cover for him. Then Vince came back and Barry went to guitar". This marked the entrance of Barry 'D'live' Ward to the fold. During this time RKL contributed various songs to a number of Mystic compilations. In 1985 the band soon recorded and released their first full-length LP, Keep Laughing on Mystic Records with Dan Sites once again providing artwork. This release included classic RKL tracks "Think Positive"(often played live as "Drink Positive"), "Ded Teds", and "Pothead" and has been named as one of the best skate punk records of all time. Ward, however, was not part of this recording. Ward said: "[RKL] moved back to Santa Barbara and I stayed in San Francisco until they came back after Keep Laughing was recorded." Following the release RKL toured and polished their live act. Things were not good between the band and Mystic Records. The deal the band signed was that they would be a paid a percentage of sales in merchandise. There is contention whether Mystic came through on that agreement. Doug Moody has stated Mystic fulfilled their end of the agreement while Ward has stated not only did they not receive much of anything in merchandise, the band had to eventually resort to bootlegging their own tapes and screening their own shirts to sell at shows. Ward was quoted as saying, "We were fucking broke, starving, dumpster diving for food, barely making gas money, and we kept going because that’s what we did. Doug Moody can say he financed the tours and paid us in merch but that’s completely untrue." Rest has also stated the band never received any money from Mystic.

=== Rock 'n Roll Nightmare ===
Due to the increasingly acrimonious situation between the band and Mystic Records and a luckless 1986 tour (dubbed the Disastour by the band), RKL was looking for a new home and found one with the independent Alchemy Records. They were also gearing up to take their sound to the next level. Bomer was the driving force and creative head of the band. Rest said: "He played so fast and tight that we were all forced to do the same. He was a perfectionist and expected the same from us." Vince Peppars would depart around this time. According to Bomer, he didn't like the direction of the new material and preferred the earlier rawer sound. Their next album, Rock 'n Roll Nightmare (also known as Lifestyles of the Rich Kids on LSD - A Rock N Roll Nightmare) stayed true to the fast tempo and hardcore sound the band was known for, but introduced elements of progressive rock and thrash metal to their sound as well as a technical musicianship that was very uncommon for the punk genre at the time. Maximumrocknroll called it "Very strong" in their review of the album. About their sound, Bomer said: "People say that we have a metal influence, but really, all our licks are pretty much rhythm and blues based, but it's super fast! So instead of saying it's metal, I'd say it's just super fast rock and roll." They still did not have a bass player for the sessions. Previously, Ricky Bowersock had succeeded Peppars, but the band had soured on him and the spot was vacated. Bowersock appeared as 'Rikkity Borrow A Sock' under a "Special No Thanks" part of the liner notes of the next album, along with Doug Moody. Subsequently, Bomer ended up playing both drums and bass on the recording. Mark Deutrom, producer of the album, says "Bomer tracking all the drum parts in a row without a scratch track is one of the more impressive things I’ve seen in a studio." Regarding the album Fat Mike of NOFX and owner/founder of Fat Wreck Chords, is quoted as saying this in 2007:

[After Keep Laughing, RKL] was the band that we wanted to be, but couldn’t pull it off. A year goes by. Rock 'n Roll Nightmare comes out. Now we're totally fucked. Suddenly, the best hardcore band of our time just got one hundred times better. This record is a landmark. No band has ever written anything like it...we listened to it at least twice a day, everyday... Twenty years later, I pull out Rock 'n Roll Nightmare and put it on. I realize that after all these years of touring and recording my band still can’t pull off any of this. I can’t play these bass riffs, Melvin can’t touch the guitar, and Smelly—who is a great drummer—can’t even come close to what Bomer can do.

Andrew Kiraly, writing for the Las Vegas Mercury, comedically gave this album the award "Best Album of 1987 I Found While Digging in My Desk Which I'm Surprised Hasn't Been 'Rediscovered' By Critics and Hailed Anew As a Masterpiece, or Maybe I'm Just Feeling Stupid and Nostalgic".

==== New bass player ====
After auditioning at least a dozen potential bass players, they finally found Joe Raposo through an advertisement in Maximumrocknroll. An audition was set up for Raposo by a friend. Raposo became the bass player for RKL in time for touring support of RocK 'n Roll Nightmare. In 1988, RKL toured Europe in support of the new album where it was particularly well received. A live album was recorded in West Berlin at Quartier Latin (now Wintergarten Varieté) on July 9, 1988. It was entitled Greatest Hits Double Live and released on Destiny Records. It was the first RKL album on CD in addition to the common vinyl and cassette formats. The artwork of the album is a collection of blotter acid paper of varying size, image, and age contributed by Mark McCloud, famous for his extensive collection which he calls the Institute of Illegal Images. Due to Raposo's status as a minor (he was only seventeen), his parents, though less than enthusiastic, gave permission for him to leave the country. Ward was named temporary guardian for the European tour. The signed guardianship papers are included in the Greatest Hits Double Live artwork.

RKL also sold their Mystic-era material to Destiny without Mystic Records' permission. Destiny proceeded to release a compilation album of Mystic recordings and called it Revenge is a Beautiful Feeling in reference to their perceived mistreatment by Mystic Records. The cover also featured a caricature of Doug Moody with his neck being twisted up by the same monster character that appeared on the cover of RKL's previous release, It's a Beautiful Feeling.

Through it all, RKL mainly played in Europe and California. There was no official US tour to back the Rock 'n Roll Nightmare album. Victor Hayden was in charge of the business side of Alchemy records. About Alchemy's promotion of Rock 'n Roll Nightmare, Sears said: "[Advertisements in] Maximumrocknroll and Flipside was about as far as it got. And we didn't have our own ad, it was sort of a Mystic deal where you had every band on the label listed as new albums... And in our payment they took out some for promotion, saying that [Victor Hayden] sent posters to all the stores, and put ads in all kinds of magazines. There was those two ads, and no one's ever seen a poster."

=== First break-up ===
In 1989 RKL called it quits for the first time. Commenting about this break-up, Fat Mike said, "the wheels started falling off the RKL train. The drug abuse and constant partying was taking its toll." Regarding the break, Ward had this to say: "Ultimately, it was the frustration with deals like [the Mystic records situation] and Alchemy later that broke up the band the first time. Had our business sense been there in the beginning and things gone right, I think Bomer wouldn’t have wanted to bag it. He broke up the band ... 'cause he thought punk rock was going nowhere". Raposo said: "If I could change one thing, I would have never let RKL break up the first time in 1989. I would have fought that to the death and would have never let it happen." Rest agreed, stating: "We broke up at the worst time we could have."

=== Epitaph years ===
==== Slang, Reactivate ====
Bomer formed a new band called Slang after the dissolution of RKL. Slang eventually included his old RKL bandmates with the notable exception of Jason Sears. Their sound was much different than the previous incarnation, dropping the fast hardcore style for a distinct rock/funk fusion. Slang had Bomer on lead vocals while newcomer Dave Raun played drums, Joe Raposo played bass, with Chris Rest and Joel Monte Mahan on guitars. Though Fat Mike had stated during an interview in Maximumrocknroll that he was going to put out a Slang record on his then new record label Fat Wreck Chords, Slang ended up signing with Epitaph Records in 1992 and an album was recorded soon after. At some point during this time Ward replaced Mahan. Just prior to its release in 1993, it was decided by Bomer and Epitaph owner/operator Brett Gurewitz it would be released as an RKL album under the title Reactivate to capitalize on the RKL name and built-in fanbase. Dan Sites again provided artwork. Before the album's release Slang, now RKL, headed on tour to Europe. The fans in Europe were not aware of the drastic sound change as the album had not yet been released. Many were disillusioned. Bomer wanted to quit early in the tour due to fan reaction. During the tour long-time friend and band roadie Will Knutilla died of a drug overdose in Zürich. Following this tragedy, Bomer quit in Italy. Jason Sears was flown into Barcelona to re-join RKL and to attempt to complete the tour playing their pre-Reactivate songs. Regarding this period, Ward said, "That Reactivate record hurt RKL more than anything, more than Mystic Records." Epitaph also re-released RKL's previous full-length album RocK 'n Roll Nightmare in 1993.

==== Riches to Rags and break-up ====
RKL pressed on without original member Bomer. They recorded a new album at the Music Annex in 1994 with completely new material. The resultant album Riches to Rags would be released in early 1995 and dedicated to Will Knutilla. The name was a sarcastic self-deprecating spoof on their previous 'Lifestyles' persona. For perhaps the first time in their history, RKL finally had a large amount of support from an experienced and highly successful independent label, Epitaph Records. The band had the song "We're Back We're Pissed" appear on Epitaph's first of a long running compilation series called Punk-O-Rama. The song "Betrayed" also appeared on the February 1995 sample CD of the magazine CMJ New Music Monthly. RKL's first music video was created featuring the song "Betrayed" and directed by Isaac Camner. Around this time they were also featured on the national tabloid news television show Hard Copy in a piece about LSD. RKL toured the world supporting Riches to Rags, including most parts of Europe and Japan. However, tensions within the band caused RKL to once again go their separate ways. Ward put together the entire "Still Flailing After All These Beers RKL" video which released on VHS through Epitaph Records. The video contained rare live footage and home videos from RKL's time on the road, an exclusive Take Me Home music video directed by Ward, and a cover of Devo's "Timing X".

== First reunion ==
In 1999 RKL reformed briefly to play a single show at a mutual friends funeral but nothing further came of it. In 2000, RKL were invited by the city of Santa Barbara, California to play at the opening of the Skaters Point Skateboard Park. Original members Jason Sears and Chris Rest reunited, along with three mutual friends (including Derrick Plourde on drums) to fill out the remaining positions. They played to approximately 2,000 people. Sears said, "...after the first note the place went haywire, me and Chris looked at each other and were all 'YES', and ever since that day we knew we had to get this back together." Along with Plourde on drums, they eventually added Chris Flippin on guitar and a returning Bomer Manzullo on bass. This line-up played sporadic shows around the West Coast for the next few years, including the San Francisco Warped Tour in 2002. Around 2002 Bomer left again and Joe Raposo returned on bass. The same year Boz Rivera replaced Derrick Plourde. RKL was starting to write and record new songs during this time. However, by November 2005 it was decided to stop the band. Flippen has said "it was because the singer was self-destructive. It kind of sucked Derrick [Plourde] in too. I think that band is cursed." The new songs were eventually included as bonus tracks on the re-issued Greatest Hits - Live In West Berlin 1988 released in 2011 on Destiny Records. An unreleased track from more recent demo recordings entitled "Twisting and Turning" was included on a 2 CD compilation album Sick Slabs of Sonic Sound from the Slaboratory released December 17, 2013.

== Second reunion ==
In January 2024, RKL announced a return with four of the members from the Riches to Rags (Chris Rest, Barry Ward, Joe Raposo, Dave Raun) recording and touring with Tony Foresta from Municipal Waste on vocals. So far they have released a newly recorded version of “Lies” with the new lineup on Ward's YouTube channel. In 2025, Foresta left and was replaced by fan of the band Abe Brennan.

== Band members' deaths ==
On March 30, 2005, Derrick Plourde, former drummer of RKL, who also played in Lagwagon, Mad Caddies, Bad Astronaut, Jaws, and The Ataris, committed suicide. Lagwagon paid tribute to Derrick with their 2005 release of the album Resolve. Bad Astronaut also paid tribute to Plourde, as well as Manzullo and Sears, with the song Stillwater, California, off of their album Twelve Small Steps, One Giant Disappointment.

On December 12, 2005, original member Richard Anthony Manzullo (aka "Bomer") died due to heart failure at his home in Summerland, California. The cause of death was the result of a long time battle with drug addictions.

On January 31, 2006, Jason Sears died due to complications while undergoing a detox treatment involving ibogaine in Tijuana, Mexico. The cause of death was the result of a pulmonary embolism caused by thrombosis.

== After RKL ==
In 1996 Bomer Manzullo and Chris Rest formed a band called The Other with future Mad Caddies drummer Boz Rivera. Bomer performed vocals and played bass. This group produced one self-titled album in 1997 on Honest Don's Records, a subsidiary label set up by Fat Wreck Chords to release material by bands that didn't fit within the roster at Fat. Rivera would later go on to join a reunited RKL.

Barry 'D'live' Ward released a solo album in 1990 on RRRecords titled Homely All American Songs & Stories For Mutant Space Dweebs From Planet Hell. He performed briefly in Gwar as Balsac the Jaws of Death, filling in for Mike Derks during Gwar's 1991 European tour. He was the guitarist for the death metal parody band Embryo Killers, releasing one self-titled album in 1993. He also played guitar for Me First and the Gimme Gimmes on their 1996 tour. Ward is the lead vocalist and guitarist for San Francisco Bay Area's Crosstops, who have released three full-length albums. Both Ward and Chris Rest played guitar on the album Lickety Split by the band Hotbox. Along with being a musician, he has also directed music videos for bands, including NOFX, Terrorgruppe, and Don Cikuta and works with Grumblefish Movies. Ward put together the entire Still Flailing After All These Beers RKL video. In 2018, Ward toured with MDC. In 2019, Ward toured with Scheisse Minnelli.

Dave Raun went on the replace future RKL member Derrick Plourde as the drummer in Lagwagon. He is also the drummer for Me First and the Gimme Gimmes and had stints as drummer in Good Riddance in 1999, Pulley in 2002, and Hot Water Music in 2009. He recorded drums for Japanese band Mr. Orange on their album Radiostaticactivity released in 2000. He also has a side project contributing lead vocals and drums in a band called District of Columbias which released an EP on Japanese label Inyaface Records in 2009 entitled We Barely Just Got Here. Chris Rest was also part of this project.

Chris Rest, Joe Raposo, and Boz Rivera are members of the San Francisco–based group King City.

Chris Rest contributed his guitar on Mad Caddies 2001 release Rock the Plank, as well as The Real McKenzies 2008 release Off the Leash. He has also been a member Lagwagon since 1997 having replaced Ken Stringfellow. Additionally, he joined No Use For A Name in 2009 replacing Dave Nassie and remained a member until their final show following the death of lead singer Tony Sly in 2012.

Joe Raposo played bass guitar on two album releases by The Real McKenzies; their 2005 album 10,000 Shots, and their 2008 album Off the Leash. He has also played with the Dwarves. In an interview with fasterlouder.com.au Joey Cape, lead singer of Lagwagon, stated that Joe Raposo is Lagwagon's new bassist. In a June 2011 interview with ExploreMusic however, Joey Cape said that things didn't work out with Raposo, and the band is testing a new bassist. After first announcing Patrick Solem as the new bass player in August 2011, Lagwagon decided that Raposo will remain a member after all in October 2011. As of 2012, Raposo also works for Zynga as the quality assurance lead for their casual social city-building simulation game CityVille.

Vocalist Jason Sears contributed lyrics and vocals for a song called "Until Next Time" on Snot's album entitled Strait Up in tribute to their late lead singer Lynn Strait. It was released on November 7, 2000. The album also features appearances by the lead vocalists of a number of major rock groups. Lynn Strait was a long-time friend of the band and his name can be viewed in the liner notes "Special Thanks" section of RKL's 1987 album Rock N Roll Nightmare. Jason Sears recorded an album with the San Diego–based band Mercury Legion originally released with the title Jason Sears and Mercury Legion: It Happened on a Friday Night - The Original Soundtrack Album on Dolphin Records. It was then repackaged and re-released as a self-titled effort; simply Jason Sears & Mercury Legion on Malt Soda Recordings.

== Legacy ==
RKL was influential on the punk rock scene. Regarding RKL's impact on punk music, Fat Mike had this to say: "When we first started, we wanted to sound like RKL." "Without RKL, there wouldn’t be a NOFX. Well, there might be a totally shitty NOFX... RKL was the band that we would always be in the shadow of. When they broke up, we kinda took their spot." Erik Sandin described them as "[NOFX's] musical heroes, we worked hard to imitate their sound". Lagwagon's Joey Cape has said "In many ways, I don’t think there would be a NOFX or a Lagwagon or many bands that sound like us if there hadn’t been an RKL. They had this style of music that would just rip the whole time." Dwarves vocalist Blag Dahlia said, "RKL carved out a niche in the 1980s as a band that could actually play in a sea of those who could not.", and called them the "standard bearers of ‘Prog-Punk’". Many people credit Bomer Manzullo as the first person to play the standard, or modern, punk beat. RKL has been credited with creating the prototype that brought success to punk rock bands that followed in the early 1990s, including The Offspring and NOFX and has been described as "your favorite band's favorite band, and in a just world, they would've been way bigger."

In The New York Times: "TimesTalks" television interview discussing musicianship in punk rock, Green Day's Billie Joe Armstrong mentioned RKL's Bomer Manzullo as an example of the high level of talent in punk rock, calling Bomer an "insane drummer", while in an interview with Communities Digital News, NOFX's Erik Sandin said: "Bomber was just out of control, he was so fucking good."

RKL, known for their live shows, once had a Goleta, California crowd in such a fervor that a club owner deployed tear gas in an attempt to stop the large mosh pit.

The three deceased members were directly referenced by NOFX in "Doornails", a song from their 2006 album Wolves in Wolves' Clothing.

Foo Fighters guitarist Chris Shiflett called RKL his "hometown pride punk band."

A Rich Kids on LSD tribute album was released on Malt Soda Recordings entitled For Those About To Trip which contains 23 covers of classic RKL tracks by various artists.

Strung Out's Jake Kiley cites RKL as an personally influential band while growing up.

The band is referenced by Janez Detd. in "My Life My Way", a song from their 2008 album For Better For Worse.

The band is referenced by The High Speed Scene in "For the Kids", a song from their 2005 album The High Speed Scene.

RKL's song "Tell Me the Truth" is referenced by Snot in "Mr. Brett", a song from their 1997 album Get Some.

The beanie boy character appears on the cover of Annihilation Time's 2005 album Annihilation Time II.

Italian band Overdrive Bonzai dedicated a song called "Jason Sears" to the late vocalist.

Brazilian crossover/hardcore band Ratos de Porão was also influenced by RKL's attitude on stage. "Another thing that really opened our minds was seeing the RKL show, Rich Kids on LSD," said Ratos de Porão vocalist João Gordo. "We have to be like those guys."

OC Weekly published an article entitled 10 Classic Punk Bands We'd Love to See Reunite, RKL being named as one of the bands.

There were rumors of an "RKLAOKE" show sometime in the Summer of 2006 as a benefit concert to raise money for Sears' children Anthony, Sierra, and Cisco. The show would have featured the remaining members of the band playing all the past favorites with different members of the audience.

== Members ==
=== Current lineup ===
- Abe Brennan – vocals (2025–present)
- Chris Rest – guitar (1982–1989, 1992–1996, 2002–2006, 2024–present)
- Joe Raposo – bass (1987–1989, 1992–1996, 2003–2006, 2024–present)
- Dave Raun – drums (1992–1996, 2024–present)
- Barry Ward – guitar (1985–1989, 1992–1996, 2024–present)

=== Former members ===
- Tony Foresta – vocals (2024)
- Jason Sears — vocals (1982–1989, 1993–1996, 2002–2006, his death)
- Chris Flippin – guitar (2002–2006)
- Boz Rivera – drums (2003–2006)
- Richard "Bomer" Manzullo – drums (1982–1989), bass (1986–1987, 2002), vocals (1992–1993) (died 2005)
- Vince Peppars – bass (1982–1985)
- Alan Duncan — guitar (1982–1983)
- Derrick Plourde – drums (2002) (died 2005)

== Discography ==
=== Studio albums ===
- Keep Laughing (Mystic Records, 1985)
- Rock 'n Roll Nightmare (Alchemy Records, 1987; re-released on CD by Epitaph Records)
- Reactivate (Epitaph Records, 1993)
- Riches to Rags (Epitaph Records, 1994)

=== EPs ===
- It's a Beautiful Feeling (Mystic Records, 1984)

=== Live albums ===
- Double Live in Berlin (Destiny Records, 1989; recorded live in Germany on 1988 tour)
- Live in a Dive (Fat Wreck Chords, 2022)

=== Compilations ===
- Nardcore (Mystic Records, 1984)
- Covers (Mystic Records, 1984)
- Mystic Super Seven Sampler No. 1 (Mystic Records, 1984)
- Return to Slimey Valley (Mystic Records, 1985)
- Revenge is a Beautiful Feeling (Destiny, 1989)

== Videos ==
- Still Flailing After All These Beers, Epitaph, VHS (1997)
- Still Flailing After All These Beers: The DVD Director's Cut, Malt Soda Recordings, DVD (2002)
