= Hoss (album) =

Studio album by Lagwagon
- Released: November 21, 1995
- Recorded: 1995
- Studios: Fat Planet; Hyde Street; The Razor's Edg
- Genres: Skate punk; pop-punk
- Length: 38:45 (original); 1:07:50 (re-issues)
- Label: Fat Wreck Chords
- Producer: Ryan Greene

Lagwagon chronology
Trashed (1994)	Hoss (1995)	Double Plaidinum (1997)

Professional ratings
Review scores
Source	Rating
AllMusic	4/5 stars
Austin American-Statesman	(favorable)
Punknews.org	5/5 stars

Hoss is Lagwagon's third album, released on November 21, 1995, by Fat Wreck Chords. It was produced by Ryan Greene.

This is the last Lagwagon album to feature drummer Derrick Plourde before his departure in 1996 (and subsequently his death in 2005) and guitarist Shaun Dewey before his departure in 1997. They would be replaced temporarily by Ken Stringfellow (The Posies) on guitar, and permanently by Dave Raun (RKL) on drums.

The cover hosts a photo of Dan Blocker as his famous character Eric "Hoss" Cartwright from the Western television show Bonanza.

The album was also supported by a 1995 tour. Some footage of the tour can be seen in the music video for the song "Razor Burn", a popular song from the album.

== Track listing ==
All tracks are written by Joey Cape.

Standard edition
No.	Title	Length
1.	"Kids Don't Like to Share"	2:40
2.	"Violins"	3:07
3.	"Name Dropping"	2:33
4.	"Bombs Away"	3:26
5.	"Move the Car"	3:20
6.	"Sleep"	1:55
7.	"Sick"	2:56
8.	"Rifle"	2:52
9.	"Weak"	2:36
10.	"Black Eyes"	3:13
11.	"Bro Dependent"	1:39
12.	"Razor Burn"	2:37
13.	"Shaving Your Head"	2:42
14.	"Ride the Snake"	3:09
Total length:		38:45

Bonus tracks
No.	Title	Length
1.	"Wind in Your Sail"	2:39
2.	"Drive By"	1:58
3.	"Over the Hill"	2:06
4.	"Laymen's Terms"	2:41
5.	"Defeat You"	1:45
6.	"Name Dropping" (Early version)	2:43
7.	"Bitter Old Man"	3:15
8.	"Sinatragandhi"	0:35
9.	"Black Eyes" (Acoustic version)	2:36
10.	"Sick" (Demo version)	2:53
11.	"Shaving Your Head" (Demo version)	2:47
12.	"Derrick Instrumental" (Demo)	3:07
Total length:		1:07:50

== Personnel ==
Personnel taken from Hoss liner notes.

Lagwagon

- Joey Cape – vocals
- Shawn Dewey – guitar
- Chris Flippin – guitar
- Jesse Buglione – bass
- Derrick Plourde – drums

Additional personnel

- Ryan Greene – production, recording, mixing
- Eddie Schreier – mastering
- Winni Wintermeyer – layout
- Brian Archer – band photo
