= Keep Laughing =

Studio album by Rich Kids on LSD
- Released: 1985
- Genre: Hardcore punk Nardcore
- Label: Mystic Records

Rich Kids on LSD chronology
It's a Beautiful Feeling (1984)	Keep Laughing (1985)	Rock 'n Roll Nightmare (1987)

Keep Laughing is an album by hardcore punk band Rich Kids on LSD, released in 1985. It was produced and engineered by Phillip (Philco) Raves at Mystic Studios in Hollywood.

== Track listing ==
No.	Title	Length
1.	"Think Positive"	2:29
2.	"Ded Teds"	2:38
3.	"Life in a Bottle"	2:38
4.	"Feelings of Hate"	1:36
5.	"Life's a Gamble"	2:59
6.	"Beautiful Feeling II"	1:53
7.	"Pothead"	2:29
8.	"Senseless Violence"	2:11
9.	"Unborn Child"	2:42
10.	"Love to Hate"	1:48
11.	"Passing Time"	1:43

== Credits ==
RKL	Production	Ref
Jason Sears – vocals; Chris Rest – guitar; Vince Peppars – bass guitar; Bomer Manzullo – drums	Dan Sites – art; Phillip Raves – producer; Mark Wheaton – layout	
