= Acoustic Volume 2 =

Studio album by Joey Cape and Tony Sly
- Released: June 18, 2012
- Studio: Tracks 1–4 and 6 recorded at the Crank Lab, San Francisco, California; Track 5 recorded at Orange Whip Studios, Santa Barbara, California; Tracks 7–12 recorded at Motor Studios, San Francisco
- Length: 36:21
- Label: Fat Wreck Chords
- Producer: Joey Cape, Jamie McMann, Tony Sly

Joey Cape chronology
Doesn't Play Well with Others (2011)	Acoustic Volume 2 (2012)	Stitch Puppy (2015)

Tony Sly chronology
Sad Bear (2011)	Acoustic Volume 2 (2012)

Acoustic Volume 2 is the second split album by punk rock singers Joey Cape and Tony Sly, released on June 18, 2012, through Fat Wreck Chords, the sequel to their 2004 album Acoustic. Like the first album, the album features 12 songs, 10 of which are acoustic renditions of songs by the singers' respective bands – Lagwagon and No Use for a Name, with each member also contributing one previously unreleased song. This is Tony Sly's last release before his death on July 31, 2012.

== Style and reception ==
PopMatters' Matthew Fiander writes that it's "hard to see why [Cape and Sly have] decided to come back to this well, since both seem to be looking forward and producing solid solo records", but regardless "they do take some interesting turns with older material." Cape's album opener "I Must Be Hateful", "his best song here", "gets reworked here into a finger-picked, confessional ballad" with his "honeyed bleat ... pared down to a hush", and with piano on the chorus through which "you can feel the pained nostalgia of the song." Like with Acoustic, "Cape's half of the record is very strong", though with a "bit curious" song selection including "Alison's Disease" which "drags a bit more than the other songs Cape plays here, wallowing in its careful layers of strings rather than building on them." Meanwhile, Sly "posits himself as the pint-fueled pub troubadour", with a "hard-struck" acoustic guitar which "clatters through NUFAN classic "Soulmate", a "ringing" guitar played against accordion, piano, and brushed percussion on "Chasing Rainbows", and album original "Liver Let Die" which is "a great last-call tune, complete with a gang of friends screaming 'One more song!' under the refrain." Both artists "bounce around their discographies to find songs to include here, which is admirable, but also can hold Acoustic Volume 2 back", but nonetheless the album is "still a solid listen beginning to end, another well-done collection for fans of these two great songwriters and their bands" which "may not invite new fans the way Acoustic could, but that doesn't mean there isn't plenty of good music here for fans already in the know."

Greg of PunkNews.org writes that "Compared to the first Acoustic split, Vol. 2 is more slick sounding, but not in a bad way", replacing the first album's synth strings with real stringed instruments and digital keyboards with an acoustic piano, making the album "sound more lush, but never overdone." Cape's half of the album includes "Resolve" which "translates pretty well to the acoustic and slower tempo, also including some tasteful tremolo electric [guitar] and something that may be an electric with an ebow. But you're really in for a treat after the tempo change, when it gets downright bluegrass, giving a whole new life to the song, perhaps signifying Joey coming to terms with his friend's death seven years later"; "I Must Be Hateful" which involves "beautiful fingerpicking and light padding keys, gelling well with Joey's voice"; "Know It All" which "sounds odd in particular coming from a 40-something instead of a 20-something" but is "still a fantastic melody and works well here outside of perhaps the lyrics"; and "Broken Record", an original song to this album "with simply guitar and Joey's voice" which is "very intimate and effective, only building to more aggressive strumming." While Greg prefers Cape's songwriting, he says that Sly's arrangements do "a more thoughtful job of fleshing out his half." His half of the album includes "Black Box", by which Greg was "won over by the chorus melody, and the cello, piano, guitar and accordion work[ing] together tastefully without being busy"; "Soulmate", which Sly keeps "peppy, thank goodness, preserving the bounce with the acoustic providing the backbeat and shaker giving the downbeat" and which includes a bass that "even has a punk tone, as chunky piano chords keep a spring in the song's step"; "Chasing Rainbows" "with its Johnny Cash train-chugging drums, more accordion, and a nice acoustic slide solo"; "Pre-Medicated Murder" which "doesn't do much for me as a song, but the arrangement is interesting with more accordion and organ chording"; and "Liver Let Die", "a drunken pub-singalong that works nicely to close out the album." The album was "obviously ... crafted for die-hard fans" of the two artists, "though I could see it being used as an 'in' with people unfamiliar with them", and is "a big improvement in sonics over the first edition, but like the first, is a very enjoyable listen for old fans such as myself. It's a bit of a nostalgia trip, and surely it was for these two men as well."

== Track listing ==
All tracks are written by Joey Cape (tracks 1–6) and Tony Sly (tracks 7–12)

No.	Title	Length
1.	"I Must Be Hateful"	3:18
2.	"Know It All"	3:22
3.	"Confession"	2:22
4.	"Alison's Disease"	2:56
5.	"Resolve"	2:10
6.	"Broken Record" (previously unreleased)	2:25
7.	"Black Box"	3:27
8.	"Soulmate"	3:37
9.	"Under the Garden"	3:16
10.	"Chasing Rainbows"	3:26
11.	"Pre-Medicated Murder"	2:43
12.	"Liver Let Die" (previously unreleased)	3:19
Total length:		36:21

== Personnel ==
Sourced from the album's liner notes.

- Joey Cape – lead vocals, acoustic guitar, percussion, keyboards (tracks 1–6)
- Tony Sly – lead vocals, acoustic guitar, percussion (tracks 7–12)

Additional musicians

- Brian Wahlstrom – piano, keyboards, vocals (1, 3)
- Angus Cooke – cello, Nashville guitar (5)
- Thom Flowers – lap steel guitar (5)
- Dustin Lanker – piano, keyboards (7–12)
- Boz Rivera – percussion (7–12)
- Rob Reich – accordion (7–12)
- Rebecca Roudman – cello (7–12)
- Joel Cuzzi – Jarvis plucking (9), choir vocals (12)
- Norm Rest – slide guitar (10)
- Kevin Seidel – choir vocals (12)
- Jon Sly – choir vocals (12)

Technical

- Joey Cape – producer (1–6), mixing, recording engineer (1, 2, 4, 6)
- Angus Cooke – recording engineer (3, 5)
- Jamie McMann – producer, mixing, recording engineer (7–12)
- Tony Sly – producer (7–12)
- Chris Fogal – mastering engineer
- Sergie Loobkoff – design
- Matthew Reamer – back cover photo
