= RKL =

RKL may refer to:

- Rich Kids on LSD, an American hardcore punk band
- Regional Basketball League (Lithuania), a third Lithuania basketball league
- Real Kabaddi League, a franchise-based professional Kabaddi league in India
- RKL, a car plate from Kolbuszowa County
