= Rock 'n Roll Nightmare =

Rock N Roll Nightmare

Studio album by Rich Kids on LSD
- Released: 1987
- Genre: Hardcore punk
- Label: Alchemy Records (1987); Epitaph Records (1993)

Rich Kids on LSD chronology
| Keep Laughing (1985) | Rock N Roll Nightmare (1987) | Reactivate (1993) |

Rock 'n Roll Nightmare is an album by hardcore punk band Rich Kids on LSD, released in 1987. It was re-mastered and re-released in 1993 on Epitaph Records. The original release on Alchemy Records included a 32-page comic and lyric book drawn by Dan Sites.

Andrew Kiraly, writing for the Las Vegas Mercury, comedically gave this album the award "Best Album of 1987 I Found While Digging in My Desk Which I'm Surprised Hasn't Been 'Rediscovered' By Critics and Hailed Anew As a Masterpiece, or Maybe I'm Just Feeling Stupid and Nostalgic".

== Track listing ==
| No. | Title | Length |
|---|---|---|
| 1. | "Scab on My Brain" | 3:22 |
| 2. | "Hangover" | 3:31 |
| 3. | "Meltdown" | 2:00 |
| 4. | "Catch Your Breath" | 3:45 |
| 5. | "Seein' You" | 2:42 |
| 6. | "Lay Your Weapons Down" | 2:29 |
| 7. | "Coming Home" | 2:30 |
| 8. | "Sargasm" | 2:44 |
| 9. | "Break the Camels Back" | 4:57 |
| 10. | "Blocked Out" | 5:00 |
| 11. | "Tribute to the Jester" | 4:03 |
| 12. | "Rock N Roll Nightmare" | 3:15 |
| 13. | "Alone Inside" | 1:53 |
| 14. | "One Light One Mind" | 2:22 |
| 15. | "Find a Way" | 2:57 |

== Credits ==
| RKL | Additional musicians | Production | Ref |
|---|---|---|---|
| Jason Sears – vocals, harmonica, spoons; Chris Rest – guitar; Barry 'd'live' Ward – guitar, vocals; Bomer Manzullo – drums, bass guitar, Washboard, Jew's harp | Jim Shaffer – banjo; Dan Sites – refrigerator grill; Espo – vocals | Mark Deutrom – producer (with RKL); Victor Hayden – Executive Producer; Jim Shaffer – engineer; Dan Sites – artwork, layout; Doug Pensinger – photography | |
