= Duh (album) =

Studio album by Lagwagon
- Released: October 1, 1992
- Recorded: January 1992
- Studio: Westbeach Recorders, Hollywood, California
- Genre: Punk rock; pop-punk
- Length: 31:00
- Label: Fat Wreck Chords
- Producer: Fat Mike

Lagwagon chronology
Duh (1992)	Trashed (1994)

Duh is the debut full-length album released by American punk rock band Lagwagon.

== Production and marketing ==
Duh was recorded in January 1992 at Westbeach Recorders with producer Fat Mike. Frontman Joey Cape on the recording:

Back then, we were inexperienced in the studio. It was less about the recording process and more about rehearsing. We recorded and mixed Duh in 4 days. There's something to be said for a budget. You have to have your shit together before you go into the studio and the end result is a record that better reflects the band’s sound at the time. I think that's why so many band's first records are considered to be their best. Personally, I don’t think Duh was our best though.

== Reception ==
Professional ratings
Review scores
Source	Rating
Allmusic	4/5 stars
Punknews.org	5/5 stars

Duh was released in October 1992 and became one of Fat Wreck Chords' highest selling releases. Although it did not enter any charts, Duh has been regarded by some critics as one of the most influential punk rock albums released in the 90s.

Duh was re-released in 2007 as a limited repressing of 524 copies on purple vinyl.

== Track listing ==
Original release

1. "Tragic Vision" – 2:33
2. "Foiled Again" – 1:34
3. "Bury the Hatchet" – 2:46
4. "Angry Days" – 3:14
5. "Noble End" – 1:38
6. "Child Inside" – 2:09
7. "Bad Moon Rising" (Creedence Clearwater Revival cover) – 1:49
8. "Beer Goggles" – 2:43
9. "Inspector Gadget" – 0:24
10. "Parents Guide to Living" – 1:45
11. "Mr. Coffee" – 2:15
12. "Of Mind and Matter" – 2:45
13. "Stop Whining" – 2:36
14. "Lag Wagon" – 2:49
2011 reissue bonus tracks

2011 reissue disc one bonus tracks

15. "Demented Rumors" (outtake) – 2:50
16. "Noble End" (early version) – 1:40
17. "Angry Days" (acoustic) – 3:54

2011 reissue disc two (tracks performed by Lagwagon while under the name Section VIII)
Super Big Demo

1. "Super Big Demo Radio Spot" – 0:14
2. "Color Blind" – 3:14
3. "Parents Guide to Living" – 1:49
4. "Beer Goggles" – 2:51
5. "Child Inside" – 2:14
6. "Foiled Again" – 1:37
7. "Noble End" – 1:43
8. "Life Without You" – 2:10
9. "Bury the Hatchet" – 3:14
10. "The Bonus Ballad of Bilbo Baggins" – 0:31
11. "Freedom of Choice" (Devo cover) – 2:35
12. "Demented Rumors" – 3:01
13. "Stop Whining" – 2:45

'89 Demo

14. "No Hard Feelings" – 4:12
15. "Truth and Justice" – 1:45
16. "Lost in Another Time" – 3:24
17. "No Conviction" – 2:14
18. "Holy Shit" – 3:21
19. "Goleta Shuffle" – 4:29
20. "Jaded Ways" – 4:21
21. "Tragic Vision" – 4:28
22. "Runs in the Family" – 6:18

== Personnel ==
Lagwagon

- Joey Cape – vocals
- Shawn Dewey – guitar
- Chris Flippin – guitar
- Jesse Buglione – bass
- Derrick Plourde – drums

Additional personnel

- Fat Mike – producer, additional vocals
- El Hefe – additional vocals
- Donnell Cameron – engineer
- Joe Peccerillo – engineer
