= Let's Talk About Feelings =

Studio album by Lagwagon
- Released: November 24, 1998
- Recorded: 1998
- Genre: Skate punk; pop-punk
- Length: 25:25; 59:02 (Reissue)
- Label: Fat Wreck Chords

Lagwagon chronology
Double Plaidinum (1997)	Let's Talk About Feelings (1998)	Let's Talk About Leftovers (2000)

Let's Talk About Feelings is the fifth full-length album released by the punk rock band Lagwagon on November 24, 1998.

Singer Joey Cape has stated that it is his favorite Lagwagon album. NOFX's Punk in Drublic (1994) was a big influence on the album. "Gun In Your Hand" contains a sound clip from the 1994 film, Swimming With Sharks and the song "Leave The Light On" contains two sound clips: One from the 1990 film, Jacob's Ladder, and another from the 1995 film, Welcome To The Dollhouse.

The front cover, painted by Mark deSalvo, depicts a teenage girl stating in a comic book word balloon "Let's Talk about Feelings". The back cover is a painting of a group of teenage girls talking in a bedroom.

== Reception ==
Professional ratings
Review scores
Source	Rating
Punknews.org	4/5 stars
Allmusic	3/5 stars
Pitchfork	9.1/10.0

Let's Talk About Feelings would debut at 33 on the Billboard Heatseekers Chart, and was met with positive reviews.

The song "May 16" would become a fan favorite and was included in the Tony Hawk's Pro Skater 2 soundtrack. In 2016 Noisey did an interview with singer and songwriter Joey Cape about the meaning of the song and how the date had the nickname, "Lagwagon Day". Speaking about the inspiration for the song:

You know, it was me, hungover in an apartment with some girl I went home with from the bar the night before. There was an acoustic guitar in the corner. I heard this ruckus happening in a park adjacent to the apartment complex, and it was just a wedding happening on this Saturday, May 16. And my heart just broke; this wedding that I hadn’t been invited to for someone I was so close to for so many years of my life, where a misunderstanding caused a falling out between us from some time before. That story is very long and I don’t want to revisit it, but I kind of picked up the guitar and the first thing that came to mind was: “It’s just another Saturday,” but obviously I was in denial. The melody and the song came together; by the time my new friend got out of the shower or whatever, I had this terribly sad song.

== Legacy ==
The album was reissued in 2011 with demos, outtakes, EP’s, and B-Sides.

In a 2008 review from Consequence of Sound it was noted that "Where as many bands lose sight of their roots when they try to expand their sound, Lagwagon knows how to use their innovation in all the right places, satisfying both indie purists and Warped Tour teenagers in the process. Going to the skatepark never sounded so good." On November 15, 2017, music and popular culture magazine Rolling Stone named Let's Talk About Feelings the 42nd greatest pop-punk album. Cleveland.com ranked "May 16" at number 48 on their list of the top 100 pop-punk songs.

== Track listing ==
All tracks are written by Lagwagon, except "Everything Turns Grey" written by Agent Orange.

No.	Title	Length
1.	"After You My Friend"	2:34
2.	"Gun in Your Hand"	2:02
3.	"Leave the Light On"	1:54
4.	"Change Despair"	1:55
5.	"Train"	2:24
6.	"Hurry up and Wait"	0:34
7.	"Everything Turns Grey" (Agent Orange cover)	1:49
8.	"Love Story"	2:20
9.	"Messengers"	1:57
10.	"The Kids Are All Wrong"	1:07
11.	"May 16"	2:57
12.	"Owen Meaney"	3:43
Total length:		25:25

2011 Reissue Bonus Tracks
No.	Title	Length
13.	"A Feedbag of Truckstop Poetry"	1:32
14.	"Alison’s Disease"	3:09
15.	"Narrow Straits"	2:07
16.	"Eat Your Words"	4:37
17.	"Want" (Jawbreaker Cover)	3:20
18.	"Burn that Bridge When We Get to It"	2:38
19.	"Losing Everyone"	1:50
20.	"Jimmy Johnson"	1:43
21.	"Randal Gets Drunk"	0:28
22.	"Messengers (Early Version)"	2:02
23.	"Bring on the Dancing Horses" (Echo & the Bunnymen Cover)	2:53
24.	"Off the Wagon (Demo)"	2:07
25.	"May 16 (Acoustic)"	2:39
26.	"Burn that Bridge When We Get to It (Acoustic)"	2:23
Total length:		59:02

== Personnel ==
Personnel taken from Let's Talk About Feelings liner notes.

Lagwagon

- Joey Cape – vocals
- Chris Flippin – guitar
- Chris Rest – guitar
- Jesse Buglione – bass
- Dave Raun – drums

Additional personnel

- Joey Cape – co-production
- Ryan Greene – co-production, recording
- Todd Capps – keyboards and piano (tracks 9 & 10)
- Angus Cooke – additional recording
- Thom Flowers – additional recording assistance
- Stephen Egerton – mixing
- Bill Stevenson – mixing
- Jason Livermore – mixing assistance
- Ramón Bretón – mastering
- Mark DeSalvo – cover art

== Charts ==
Chart	Peak position
US Heatseekers Albums (Billboard)	33
