= Let's Talk About Leftovers =

Compilation album by Lagwagon
- Released: February 8, 2000
- Recorded: December 10, 1990–December 4, 1999
- Genres: Punk rock Skate punk Melodic hardcore
- Length: 74:14
- Labels: My Records, Fat Wreck Chords
- Producer: Ryan Greene

Lagwagon chronology
Let's Talk About Feelings (1998)	Let's Talk About Leftovers (2000)	Blaze (2003)

Professional ratings
Review scores
Source	Rating
AbsolutePunk	(84%)
Kerrang!	3/5 stars
Ox-Fanzine	Unfavorable

Let's Talk About Leftovers is an album consisting of a compilation of unreleased, B-sides and rare songs by Lagwagon, originally released on February 8, 2000 on Joey Cape's now defunct My Records label. It was re-released on August 27, 2002 by Fat Wreck Chords. Most of the album's tracks were later re-released in 2011 on the box set Putting Music In Its Place which contained remastered versions of Lagwagon's first five albums. The b-sides and rare tracks - along with other previously unreleased material - were assorted to their respective album.

== Track listing ==
1. "A Feedbag of Truckstop Poetry"
2. "Narrow Straits" (tribute to Lynn Strait)
3. "Burn That Bridge When We Get to It"
4. "Losing Everyone" (Drag the River cover)
5. "Jimmy Johnson"
6. "Eat Your Words"
7. "Want" (Jawbreaker cover)
8. "Bring On the Dancing Horses" (Echo & the Bunnymen cover)
9. "Randal Gets Drunk" (from Short Music for Short People)
10. "Raise a Family" (from Physical Fatness)
11. "Restrain"
12. "No One Like You" (Scorpions cover)
13. "Freedom of Choice" (Devo cover)
14. "Brodeo"
15. "Drive By"
16. "Wind in Your Sail"
17. "Over the Hill"
18. "Defeat You"
19. "Laymen's Terms" (from Survival of the Fattest)
20. "Jazzy Jeff"
21. "The Champ"
22. "Demented Rumors"
23. "Truth and Justice"
24. "No Conviction"
25. "Jaded Ways"
- Plus hidden tracks and 3 live songs
