= Trashed (album) =

Studio album by Lagwagon
- Released: January 4, 1994
- Recorded: 1993
- Studios: Westbeach Recorders, Hollywood, California
- Genres: Skate punk; melodic hardcore
- Length: 36:45; 73:28 (Reissue)
- Label: Fat Wreck Chords
- Producers: Lagwagon, Fat Mike

Lagwagon chronology
Duh (1992)	Trashed (1994)	Hoss (1995)

Singles from Trashed
- 1. "Island of Shame" Released: 1994

Trashed is the second album by the punk rock group Lagwagon, released on January 4, 1994. This album builds on the skate punk sound of their debut album, with harmonized vocals and start-stop rhythms reminiscent of NOFX.

== Production and composition ==
Like its predecessor, Duh, Trashed was recorded at Westbeach Recorders in 1993 with producer Fat Mike. The album was also produced by the band themselves. Fat Mike also provides backing vocals on the second track of the album, "Lazy".

Discussing "Know It All", guitarist Sean Dewey explained that the song was intended to serve as "constructive criticism, towards people who are involved in the whole scene and they like certain bands at certain times."

"Island of Shame" is an aggressive song written in the minor key with lyrics concerning small-town close-mindedness and homophobia.

Trashed also includes a cover of Van Morrison's "Brown Eyed Girl" as its tenth track. The end of the album contains a parody of "Mama Said Knock You Out" by LL Cool J, called "Back One Out".

== Artwork ==
The album's cover features scattered garbage, which references the album's title. In the center of the trash is a photograph of the Lagwagon members wearing soccer uniforms with their band logo on the shirts. The 1979 AC/DC album Highway to Hell is seen at the top right of the cover. The back cover features a picture of the back of the band's tour van, spray painted with the track names.

== Reception ==
Professional ratings
Review scores
Source	Rating
AllMusic	4.5/5 stars
Punknews.org	5/5 stars
Punk Planet	Favorable

Trashed was released on January 4, 1994 through Fat Wreck Chords. The album has received critical acclaim from reviewers. Mike DaRonco of AllMusic gave the album a score of 4.5 out of 5 stars, complimenting the band for their lyrical and musical maturity compared to many of their peers on Fat Wreck Chords and complimenting the band for their growth from their debut album Duh. DaRonco singled out "Island of Shame" for its mature lyrics and distinguished "Know It All," "Give It Back," and "Goin' South" as album highlights, also complimenting the cover of "Brown Eyed Girl" for being "[butchered]. . . . in a way that makes it ten times more enjoyable," and concluding the review by stating, "This album should appeal to the 15-year-old skater in all of us."

Punknews reviewer Greg granted the album 5 out of 5 stars in a retrospective review published in July 2014. Greg's review praises the band's metal sensibilities and their ability to blend those with pop sensibilities, which were present since the band's debut Duh, calling the band "poppy and technical". Greg says the band was "better at what NOFX did than NOFX was themselves" because Lagwagon was "faster, played their instruments more proficiently, and had better singing and more well-crafted lyrics." Greg also complimented the band's ability to craft mature lyrics, such as those in "Island of Shame," alongside lighthearted lyrics like those in "Stokin' the Neighbors" and their parody of "Mama Said Knock You Out." Like DaRonco, Greg's review compliments the band's musical talent, distinguishing Derrick Plourde's creative approach to drumming. Greg concludes the review by calling Trashed "a classic skate punk album, and one of [Fat Wreck Chords'] best releases." A reviewer for Punk Planet favorably compared Lagwagon to NOFX and Bad Religion in their musical style and lyrical approach and called the album "vital" for fans of Southern California-based melodic hardcore bands.

== Legacy ==
Trashed was also released in the same year as Green Day's Dookie, Bad Religion’s Stranger than Fiction, NOFX's Punk in Drublic, and The Offspring's Smash, which are all widely considered to be the most important and successful albums of the 1990s California punk scene era.

Trashed received mainstream attention partly due to the relative success of the cover of "Brown Eyed Girl", although lead singer Joey Cape stated in a retrospective interview that found the album's success encouraging rather than intimidating: "in some ways[,] it kind of relieves pressure more than anything because you feel more comfortable doing what you want to do if things are going well."

New York melodic hardcore punk band After the Fall has a song called "1994", which mentions Trashed and other albums released that year. "1994" is from their 2009 album Fort Orange.

In December 2022, punk rock band Trashed Ambulance implied in an interview that Trashed may have inspired their band's name.

== Track listing ==
No.	Title	Length
1.	"Island of Shame"	2:39
2.	"Lazy"	1:48
3.	"Know It All"	2:29
4.	"Stokin' the Neighbors"	3:08
5.	"Give It Back"	2:35
6.	"Rust"	2:58
7.	"Goin' South"	2:00
8.	"Dis'chords"	3:15
9.	"Coffee and Cigarettes"	2:51
10.	"Brown Eyed Girl" (Van Morrison cover)	3:22
11.	"Whipping Boy"	2:22
12.	"No One"	2:01
13.	"Bye for Now"	2:47
14.	"Back One Out" (Hidden Track, parody cover of "Mama Said Knock You Out" by LL Cool J)	1:31
Total length:		36:45

2011 Reissue Bonus Tracks
No.	Title	Length
15.	"The Champ"	2:01
16.	"Choke (Early Version)"	3:51
17.	"Give It Back (Early Version)"	3:04
18.	"Path of Least Resistance (Chemikil Demo)"	4:42
19.	"Know It All (Demo)"	3:48
20.	"Rust (Demo)"	3:01
21.	"Island of Shame (Demo)"	2:45
22.	"Lazy (Demo)"	1:49
23.	"Whipping Boy (Demo)"	2:42
24.	"Stokin' the Neighbors (Demo)"	3:16
25.	"Goin' South (Demo)"	2:05
26.	"Jazzy Jeff"	1:03
27.	"Whipping Boy (Acoustic)"	2:36
Total length:		73:28

== Personnel ==
- Joey Cape – vocals
- Chris Flippin – guitar
- Shawn Dewey – guitar
- Jesse Buglione – bass
- Derrick Plourde – drums
- Lagwagon – producer
- Fat Mike – producer, backing vocals on "Lazy"
- Recorded by Don Cameron
- Recorded by Joe Peccerillo
- Chris Shiflett — Guitar solo on Bye for Now
- Scott Shiflett — Guitar solo on Stokin’ the neighbors
