= Pure Juice =

Studio album by Summercamp
- Released: 1997
- Recorded: Los Angeles, California, U.S.
- Studios: Village Recorder; Ocean
- Genres: Alternative rock, power pop
- Length: 43:37
- Label: Maverick
- Producers: Chris Shaw, Summercamp

Summercamp chronology
Old Man (1993)	Pure Juice (1997)	Tonight! (1997)

Singles from Pure Juice
- 1. "Drawer" Released: 1997; 2. "Should I Walk Away" Released: 1997

Pure Juice is the debut album by alternative rock band Summercamp, released in 1997 by Maverick Recording Company.

== Background and promotion ==
In late 1996, Summercamp signed with Madonna's Maverick Records, which was part of Warner Music Group. Afterwards, Summercamp began working on their major label debut, Pure Juice. Summercamp would be heavily hyped in the press, with Madonna telling MTV that the band were better than Oasis. Pure Juice was released on June 17, 1997, and that same month the band joined the 1997 edition of the Lollapalooza festival, which ran to August. Around that time, a music video was also released for the single "Drawer". The tour for the album lasted through to December 1997, with the band playing in Japan that month.

== Release ==
"Drawer" peaked at No. 21 on the Modern Rock chart in the US, receiving airplay in the summer of 1997. Another single, "Should I Walk Away", became a top ten hit in Japan. The "Drawer" video was shown on MTV's alternative show 120 Minutes. It premiered on the June 29, 1997, episode, and aired again on the July 6, 1997, episode, which was hosted by the bands Faith No More and MxPx.

== Critical reception ==
Professional ratings
Review scores
Source	Rating
AllMusic	2.5/5 stars
NME	4/10

Jason Ankeny of AllMusic labeled the album "derivative and highly formulaic" and "heavily influenced by late-'70s radio". Sky Daniels of R&R magazine commented in 1997 that, "Summercamp continues a natural progression for Santa Barbara bands, beginning with a harder faster approach than its predecessors, but still yielding the prerequisite humm-ability that living in Paradise elicits." In July 1997, R.S. Murthi of Malaysian paper the New Straits Times gave the album's sound four out of five stars, and the performances three out of five stars. He wrote, "the harmonies are not terrific, but they work, and often enhance the instrumental textures. If you need an analogy let's just say the band sounds like a less folkish Toad the Wet Sprocket."

== Appearances in other media ==
In 1998, "On Her Mind" appeared in the film BASEketball, and in 2000 the song "Nowhere Near" appeared on the soundtrack for Digimon: The Movie. "Play It by Ear" was also used in the Buffy the Vampire Slayer episode "Crush".

== Track listing ==
All songs produced by Chris Shaw and Summercamp.

No.	Title	Writer(s)	Length
1.	"Drawer"	Tim Cullen	4:01
2.	"Nowhere Near"	Cullen	2:20
3.	"The Bright Side"	Sean McCue	4:23
4.	"Pure Juice"	Cullen	2:07
5.	"Should I Walk Away"	McCue	3:09
6.	"Keep an Eye on You"	Cullen	4:22
7.	"Play It by Ear"	McCue	2:32
8.	"Ninety Nine"	Cullen	3:39
9.	"On Her Mind"	Cullen	3:06
10.	"Mountain Size"	McCue	3:07
11.	"Two Shades of Grey"	McCue	3:36
12.	"With Your Blessing"	Cullen	3:03
13.	"Thing of the Past"	Cullen	4:12

== Band members ==
- Tim Cullen – guitars and vocals
- Sean McCue – guitars and vocals
- Misha Feldmann – bass/backing vocals
- Tony Sevener – drums/backing vocals

Additional personnel

- Chris Shaw – engineering and mixing
- Dave Nottingham, Tom Fiore & James Murray – 2nd engineers
- Eddy Schreyer at Oasis Mastering
- Guy Oseary – A&R
- Kevin Reagan & Larimie Garcia – art direction/design
- Karl Hentz – cover photo
- Larry Mills, Chris Strother, Jodi Wille, Kristen Lauck – inside photos
