= I Think My Older Brother Used to Listen to Lagwagon =

I Think My Older Brother Used To Listen To Lagwagon

EP by Lagwagon
- Released: August 19, 2008
- Recorded: 2005
- Studio: Motor Studios, San Francisco; The Crank Lab, San Francisco
- Genre: Punk rock Skate punk
- Length: 19:04
- Label: Fat Wreck Chords
- Producer: Jamie McMann, Joey Cape

Lagwagon chronology
Resolve (2005)	I Think My Older Brother Used To Listen To Lagwagon (2008)	Hang (2014)

I Think My Older Brother Used to Listen to Lagwagon is a Lagwagon EP released in 2008. It is their first recording released since 2005's Resolve and final recording with longtime bassist Jesse Buglione, who left the band in 2010.

The EP charted at No.30 on Billboard's Top Heatseekers Chart in September 2008.

== Reception ==
Professional ratings
Review scores
Source	Rating
Allmusic	3.5/5 stars

Allmusic's Jason Lymangrover states "The seven songs race by in a blur of themes dealing primarily with the abstract, but also the ripe topic of aging: specifically holes in the memory of a worn-out drug-addled mind, and disillusionment with society, all while glancing back at their long career and realizing that even though they have regrets they have every intention of continuing on."

Eric Nakamura in Giant Robot, states "There are no weak links in this seven - song release. The Fat Wreck Chords flagship band still has its signature slow - down moments that build up into punk rock and singer Joey Cape keeps up his vocal range as much as he can in for the genere."

== Track listing ==
1. B Side - 2:58
2. No Little Pill - 2:31
3. Errands - 3:05
4. Memoirs and Landmines - 1:55
5. Fallen - 2:56
6. Live It Down - 3:43
7. Mission Unaccomplished - 1:56

== Production ==
- Scott Cole - Album Photography
