= Twelve Small Steps, One Giant Disappointment =

Studio album by Bad Astronaut
- Released: November 14, 2006
- Genre: Indie Rock
- Length: 50:07
- Label: Fat Wreck Chords
- Producers: Joey Cape; Angus Cooke; Thomas Flowers

Bad Astronaut chronology
Houston: We Have a Drinking Problem (2002)	Twelve Small Steps, One Giant Disappointment (2006)

Professional ratings
Review scores
Source	Rating
AbsolutePunk.net	94% link
Allmusic	link
Decoymusic	link

Twelve Small Steps, One Giant Disappointment is the third studio album from the American indie rock band Bad Astronaut. It was released in November 2006, on Fat Wreck Chords and follows Houston: We Have a Drinking Problem from 2002 and Acrophobe from Feb 2001 on Honest Don's. Due to the death of drummer Derrick Plourde, it is Bad Astronaut's final album. It is also the only Bad Astronaut release to feature all original material.

The song "Violet" was originally released by Joey Cape as a solo acoustic track on his split LP with No Use for a Name singer Tony Sly. "Minus" was also previously released as a Cape solo track on the Fat Wreck Chords compilation PROTECT: A Benefit for the National Association to Protect Children.

== Track listing ==
1. "Good Morning Night" – 3:53
2. "Ghostwrite" – 3:56
3. "Beat" – 5:31
4. "Stillwater, California" – 4:01
5. "One Giant Disappointment" – 2:59
6. "Minus" – 3:08
7. "Best Western" – 3:56
8. "San Francisco Serenade" – 4:33
9. "Autocare" – 4:01
10. "Violet" – 1:59
11. "Go Humans" – 1:49
12. "The 'F' Word" – 8:02
13. "The Thirteenth Step" – 2:19

== Trivia ==
The song "Ghostwrite" contains several allusions to legendary Southern California punk band T.S.O.L., including the lines "True sounds of liberty/Straining through my voice" and "Posing Weathered Statues."

== Credits ==
- Joey Cape – lead vocals, bass
- Angus Cooke – cello, percussion, bass, guitar, vocals
- Sean McCue – guitar
- Thomas Flowers – banjo, guitar, mandolin
- Derrick Plourde – drums
- Todd Capps – keyboards
- Jonathan Cox – loops
- Produced and engineered by Angus Cooke, Joey Cape, and Thomas Flowers
- Engineered by Ryan Greene
- Additional Mixing Jamie McMann
