= Doesn't Play Well with Others =

Studio album by Joey Cape
- Released: June 1, 2011
- Genre: Acoustic, alternative rock, indie rock, folk punk
- Length: 39:42
- Label: Self-released
- Producer: Joey Cape

Joey Cape chronology
Liverbirds (2010)	Doesn't Play Well with Others (2011)	Acoustic: Volume Two (2012)

Digital Download Edition

Doesn't Play Well with Others is the second full-length solo album by Lagwagon and Bad Astronaut frontman Joey Cape, released on June 1, 2011. It was released with one song at a time, each month, during 2010 on Joey Cape's official website, beginning on January 18, 2010.

The first track "Going for the Bronze" was released on January 18, 2010, while the last track "I Always Knew This Was Going to End Badly" was released on December 12, 2010. Cape's daughter Violet drew the pictures which are used as the artwork for each of the songs, as well as the full album's artwork.

Before the release of the album, Cape has announced that those who will get a paid subscription would get a new song each month as well as receiving a package including a signed limited edition CD and a vinyl of all 12 songs. The package also included a DVD made entirely by Joey Cape including videos he made by himself to each song on the album, live concert footage, an interview and random behind the scenes tour footage. The full-length was released on June 1, 2011 in CD and vinyl record format after a short delay.

On April 25, 2011, Cape has revealed that he is indeed working on a new project called Joey Cape's Bad Loud and that he already recorded a full-length album with the band, to feature electric full-band renditions of acoustic songs from this album, as well as his first solo album Bridge.

== Track listing ==
No.	Title	Length
1.	"Going for the Bronze"	4:35
2.	"Okay"	3:09
3.	"It's Always Sunny"	3:34
4.	"No Mirror"	2:53
5.	"Montreal" (feat. Hugo Mudie of The Sainte Catherines)	4:03
6.	"Drag"	2:11
7.	"Uniform"	3:34
8.	"The Greatest Generation"	2:30
9.	"The Fish Rots from the Head Case Down"	2:17
10.	"I'm Not Gonna Save You"	2:40
11.	"A Song for the Missing"	2:46
12.	"I Always Knew This Was Going to End Badly"	5:30

== Personnel ==
- Joey Cape - lead vocals, acoustic guitar, keyboards, percussion
