= Tonight! (Summercamp EP) =

EP by Summercamp
- Released: 1997
- Genre: Alternative rock
- Length: 20:27

Summercamp chronology
Pure Juice (1997)	Tonight! (1997)

Tonight! is an EP by alternative rock band Summercamp, released in 1997.

== Track listing ==
No.	Title	Writer(s)	Length
1.	"Nowhere Near" (Live)	Tim Cullen	2:16
2.	"High Horse" (Live)	Tim Cullen	3:16
3.	"The Bright Side" (Live)	Sean McCue	4:19
4.	"Anyone"	Tim Cullen	3:14
5.	"Miss Leonard"	Tim Cullen	3:09
6.	"Drawer" (Demo)	Tim Cullen	4:08
7.	"Tonight!"		0:05

== Band members ==
- Tim Cullen - guitars and vocals
- Sean McCue - guitars and vocals
- Misha Feldmann - bass/backing vocals
- Tony Sevener - drums/backing vocals
