= Houston: We Have a Drinking Problem =

Studio album by Bad Astronaut
- Released: October 15, 2002
- Recorded: Orange Whip Studios, Santa Barbara
- Genre: Punk rock
- Length: 47:10
- Label: Honest Don's; DON041-2
- Producer: Joey Cape and Angus Cooke

Bad Astronaut chronology
Acrophobe (2001)	Houston: We Have a Drinking Problem (2002)	Twelve Small Steps, One Giant Disappointment (2006)

Houston: We Have a Drinking Problem is the second studio album by Bad Astronaut, released in 2002 on the Honest Don's independent record label. The title is a reference to the quote "Houston, we have a problem," which is somewhat inaccurately attributed to astronaut Jim Lovell aboard the Apollo 13 spacecraft when an explosion in the Service Module endangered the crew. The track "Our Greatest Year" features a harmonica solo by John Popper of Blues Traveler fame.

The album features two covers. "Break Your Frame" is originally performed by Armchair Martian, and "Solar Sister" is originally performed by The Posies.

== Track listing ==
1. "These Days" - 4:17
2. "Clear Cutting" - 1:40
3. "Single" - 3:01
4. "Break Your Frame" (Jon Snodgrass) - 3:20
5. "Disarm" - 4:26
6. "Not a Dull Moment" - 2:36
7. "You Deserve This" - 3:05
8. "If I Had a Son" - 3:52
9. "Solar Sister" (Jon Auer & Ken Stringfellow) - 3:18
10. "Off the Wagon" - 3:09
11. "Another Dead Romance" - 3:29
12. "Killers and Liars" - 3:04
13. "Our Greatest Year" - 3:44
14. "The Passenger" - 4:03

(original performers / writers shown in parentheses)
