= Joe Raposo (bassist) =

American bassist

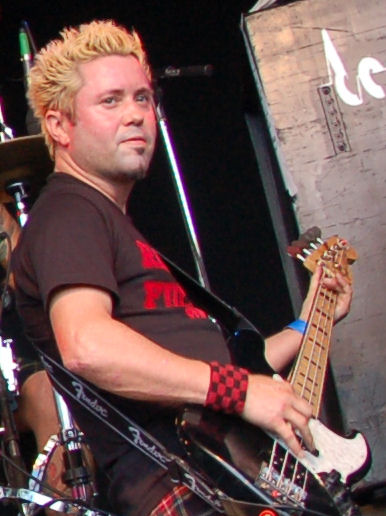
- Raposo playing with The Real McKenzies

Background information
- Born: 1970 (age 55–56)
- Genres: Punk rock, skate punk
- Occupation: Musician
- Instrument: Bass guitar
- Years active: 1987–present

Joe Raposo (born 1970) is an American musician. He is the bassist for the California punk rock band Lagwagon and QA engineer lead at Zynga. He also played bass for a period of time for The Real Mckenzies and Mad Caddies. Additionally, Raposo plays bass for the San Francisco-based fusion group King City, with fellow Lagwagon member Chris Rest as well as filling in on bass for several live shows with the Dwarves. Raposo began his career in 1987 at the age of seventeen by joining California hardcore punk band Rich Kids on LSD as their new bassist and remained with RKL until their hiatus in 1996. In 1995, Maximumrocknroll called Raposo "flat out the best bass player in the state of California." He began playing shows with RKL again in 2003 (after they had re-formed a year prior) until their current hiatus after the death of lead singer Jason Sears. Raposo joined Lagwagon in 2010, replacing original bassist Jesse Buglione. Raposo also plays bass in the cover band Uke-Hunt and is the bass player for the band A Vulture Wake, which is fronted by Chad Price from the band ALL

In 2018 his band A Vulture Wake released their first full-length album called The Appropriate Level of Outrage.
