= Bridge (Joey Cape album) =

Studio album by Joey Cape
- Released: (United States) September 29, 2008 (Europe) October 21, 2008
- Recorded: 2008
- Genre: Acoustic, alternative rock, indie rock, folk punk
- Length: 37:08
- Label: Suburban Home/ Fat Wreck Chords
- Producer: Joey Cape

Joey Cape chronology
Acoustic (2004)	Bridge (2008)	Who Wants to Get Down? (2009)

Bridge is the first solo album by Californian punk rock musician Joey Cape, frontman of Lagwagon and Bad Astronaut, released on September 29, 2008, through Suburban Home Records.

Unlike Cape's work in his bands, the album is an acoustic alternative/indie rock album, much like his work with Tony Sly on their collaborative album Acoustic from 2004. In the album's booklet, Cape describes the solo album as a "rite of passage."

5 songs on the album are acoustic renditions of songs previously released on the Lagwagon EP I Think My Older Brother Used to Listen to Lagwagon which was released in August of the same year. Those are: "Errands", "B Side", "Memoirs and Landmines", "No Little Pill" and "Mission Unaccomplished".

== Track listing ==
No.	Title	Length
1.	"Errands"	3:38
2.	"We're Not In Love Anymore"	2:59
3.	"Canoe"	3:01
4.	"B Side"	2:51
5.	"Who We've Become"	3:26
6.	"Memoirs and Landmines"	2:49
7.	"The Ramones Are Dead"	1:51
8.	"Non Sequitur"	3:30
9.	"No Little Pill"	4:05
10.	"Mission Unaccomplished"	1:59
11.	"Gun It. No, Don't"	3:16
12.	"Home"	3:43

== Personnel ==
- Joey Cape - lead vocals, acoustic guitar, production, engineering
