= Summercamp =

US musical group

- Also known as: Old Man
- Origin: Santa Barbara, California, United States
- Genres: Alternative rock, Indie rock, Indie pop
- Years active: 1993–2001
- Label: Maverick Records
- Members: Tim Cullen; Sean McCue; Misha Feldmann; Ramy Antoun
- Past members: Tony Sevener; Erik Herzog; Eric Merone

Summercamp is an alternative rock quartet from Santa Barbara, California, United States, where, in 1987, vocalist/guitarists Tim Cullen and Sean McCue met in high school. Another fellow student, bass guitarist Misha Feldmann, joined soon after; and drummer Tony Sevener signed on in 1994, making the line-up complete. With Chris Shaw producing, the band issued its first LP, Pure Juice, in 1997 on Maverick Records.

They charted with the single "Drawer" in the U.S. and "Should I Walk Away" reached the Top 10 in Japan.

Summercamp toured the US, Europe and Japan in support of their release, including the second stage of the 1997 Lollapalooza, the 1997 Pukkelpop, and appearing at the very first Fuji Rock Festival in Japan in 1997. The band also toured with Failure, Poster Children, Tonic and fellow Santa Barbarans, Toad the Wet Sprocket.

After coming off the road in support of Pure Juice, the band started work on a second album that was finished and for which a promotional video was shot but went unreleased, as record company issues led to their eventual breakup in 2001. Summercamp reunited in mid-2015 and performed a reunion show on August 8 at Velvet Jones in Santa Barbara.

Summercamp also released a new single called "PeachTree" independently through their bandcamp page on August 28, 2015.

== Members ==
- Tim Cullen (born September 12, 1969) – lead vocals/guitar
- Sean McCue (born March 3, 1969) – lead vocals/guitar
- Misha Feldmann (born December 19, 1970) – bass guitar
- Eric Merone (born August 11, 1970 - bass guitar
- Tony Sevener (born August 21, 1970) – drums
- Ramy Antoun – drums
- Erik Herzog – drums (in Old Man)

== Discography ==
=== Studio albums ===
- Old Man (1993) (under the name Old Man)
- Pure Juice (1997)

=== EPs ===
- Tonight! (1997)
- Sampler (1997) Maverick Recording Company PRO-CD-8730 U.S.A. A preview of their upcoming album Pure Juice.

=== Singles ===
- "Drawer" (1997, Maverick) No. 21 Modern Rock Tracks, No. 37 Mainstream Rock Tracks
- "Should I Walk Away" (1997)
- "PeachTree" (2015)

== Old Man ==
Old Man

Studio album by Old Man
- Released: June 1, 1993
- Genre: Pop rock
- Length: 43:14
- Producer: Old Man

Old Man chronology
''Old Man'' (1993)	Pure Juice (1997)

On June 1, 1993, Old Man (effectively the first incarnation of Summercamp, with Sean McCue, Tim Cullen, Misha Feldmann, and Erik Herzog on drums) released a self-titled album, recorded on a TASCAM 38 1/2" analog 8-track tape machine at McCue's home in Santa Barbara. Three of the songs on this album ("Should I Walk Away", "The Bright Side" and "Thing of the Past") appeared on Pure Juice four years later. Dean Dinning of Toad the Wet Sprocket plays bass guitar on "Johnny", "Strollin'" and "Time Passes". Under the Summercamp moniker, a different version of the song "Johnny" was released on the 1997 My Records label compilation Happy Meals: A Smorgasbord of My Favorite Songs.

Old Man
No.	Title	Writer(s)	Length
1.	"Should I Walk Away"	Sean McCue	3:12
2.	"The Bright Side"	Sean McCue	4:36
3.	"Johnny"	Sean McCue	3:43
4.	"Your Gravity"	Sean McCue	3:29
5.	"Give Me a Moment"	Sean McCue	3:44
6.	"Thing of the Past"	Tim Cullen	4:04
7.	"Big Fatty"	Tim Cullen	3:36
8.	"Strollin'"	Sean McCue	4:38
9.	"Revelation"	Tim Cullen, Sean McCue, Erik Herzog	3:11
10.	"Life in General"	Sean McCue	2:45
11.	"Time Passes"	Sean McCue	4:57
12.	"Escondido"	Sean McCue	1:19

== Solo discographies ==
=== Tim Cullen ===
==== Albums ====
- Fun Razor (2004)

==== Singles ====
- "One More Time Around" (February 2010)
- "Merry Christmas" (December 2010)
- "Face" (January 2011)

=== Sean McCue ===
==== Albums ====
- Apart (2006)
- Apart - Instrumentals (2006)

==== Singles and EPs ====
- "I Never Said" (1999)
- "Peace Is the Word" ("Grease" cover - 2008)
- "Lying in the Shade" (2009)
- "Rescue" (May 2010)
- "Falling for You" (July 2010)
- "Feeling Creative" (August 2010)
- SAF3 EP (August 2010)
- "Home" (April 2015)

=== Sean & Michelle (Sean McCue and Michelle Beauchesne) ===
==== Albums ====
- Simple Lines (2009)
- After the Fire (May 2012)

==== Singles ====
- "Beautiful Day" (U2 cover - November 2010)
- "Blackbird" (Beatles cover - November 2010)
- "You Can Close Your Eyes" (April 2011)
