= Real Kabaddi League =

Kabaddi tournament in India

- Country: India
- First tournament: 2019
- Number of teams: 8
- Current champions: Jaipur Jaguars (1st title)
- Most successful: Shekhawati Kings (2 titles)
- Website: realkabaddi.com

The Real Kabaddi League, also known as (RKL) was a franchise-based professional Kabaddi league in India. League was founded by Shubham Choudhary, and its co-founder is Rannvijay Singha. As of 2024, the current champion was the Jaipur Jaguars.

== Background ==
Real Kabaddi League was initially established as the Rajasthan Kabaddi League before undergoing a rebranding process to become the Real Kabaddi League.

== Teams ==
The teams in the Real Kabaddi League are:

DOMESTIC TEAMS

1. Chambal Pirates
2. Bikana Riders
3. Jaipur Jaguars
4. Singh Soorma
5. Mewar Monks
6. Aravali Eagles
7. Jodhana Warriors
8. Shekhawati Kings

INTERNATIONAL TEAMS

1. Aussie Raiders
2. Bangla Titans
3. Emirati Falcons
4. Indo Warriors
5. Persian Panthers
