= Resolve (Lagwagon album) =

Studio album by Lagwagon
- Released: November 1, 2005
- Recorded: 2005
- Genres: Pop-punk, skate punk
- Length: 39:43
- Label: Fat Wreck Chords
- Producer: Joey Cape

Lagwagon chronology
Blaze (2003)	Resolve (2005)	I Think My Older Brother Used to Listen to Lagwagon (2008)

Professional ratings
Review scores
Source	Rating
AllMusic	4/5 stars
IGN	7.6/10

Resolve is Lagwagon's seventh studio album, released in 2005. It is inspired by and dedicated to former Lagwagon drummer Derrick Plourde, who died by suicide on March 30, 2005. All of the songs were written shortly after that event. Resolve was Lagwagon's last studio album to feature longtime bassist Jesse Buglione, who left the band in 2010.

== Release ==
On June 24, 2005, Fat Wreck Chords announced that Lagwagon's next album would be released in five months' time. On August 31, 2005, the album's artwork and track listing was posted online. On October 6, 2005, "Automatic" was posted online. Resolve was made available for streaming on October 31, 2005, before being released the following day through Fat Wreck Chords. It was promoted with tour of the US with fellow Fat Wreck Chords act the Lawrence Arms. On December 1, 2005, a music video was released for "Heartbreaking Music"; it was made as a memorial to Plourde. In January 2006, they embarked on a tour of Europe with A Wilhelm Scream, which was followed by a trek to Australia. Between June and August 2006, Lagwagon played a few shows in South Africa with Fuzigish, which led into a European tour, and then a US tour with the Lawrence Arms and A Wilhelm Scream. In November 2006, the band went on a short tour of Japan, which they dubbed the JaPANDAmonium Tour. In April 2007, they embarked on a tour of Europe, which included an appearance at the Groezrock festival. Following this, they appeared on most of that year's Warped Tour, missing three weeks' worth of shows in the middle of the trek. They then played three shows in California in September 2007.

== Track listing ==
1. "Heartbreaking Music" – 2:22
2. "Automatic" – 3:16
3. "Resolve" – 2:07
4. "Virus" – 3:31
5. "Runs in the Family" – 1:56
6. "The Contortionist" – 3:24
7. "Sad Astronaut" – 3:01
8. "Rager" – 1:21
9. "The Worst" – 2:30
10. "Creepy" – 1:32
11. "Infectious" – 3:50
12. "Days of New" (ends at 2:56; hidden acoustic track "The Chemist" starts at 7:50) – 10:53
13. "Fallen" (iTunes only)
