= Derrick Plourde =

American drummer (1971–2005)

- Plourde in 2002

Background information
- Born: October 17, 1971; Goleta, California, U.S.
- Died: March 30, 2005 (aged 33) Goleta, California, U.S.
- Cause of death: Suicide by firearm
- Genres: Skate punk, punk rock, pop punk
- Occupations: Musician
- Instruments: Drums, percussion
- Years active: 1989–2005
- Label: Fat Wreck Chords

Derrick William Plourde (October 17, 1971 – March 30, 2005) was an American drummer, musician and artist. Born in Goleta, California, he was active from 1989 until his death in 2005. Although best known as a former member of Lagwagon, Plourde also played in several different bands like Bad Astronaut, Jaws, The Ataris, Mad Caddies and Rich Kids on LSD, among others. Besides drums, he played guitar and was described as a multi-instrumentalist. Aside from music, he was known as a skilled painter and gifted carpenter, and was appreciated for his off-beat sense of humor. After a long battle with drug addiction, Plourde died by suicide on March 30, 2005.

== Career ==
Plourde first caught the attention of the pop-punk underground in the Goleta/Santa Barbara scene in the early 1990s in the band Lagwagon (then called Section 8). That recognition expanded beyond the Southern California scene in 1992 with the release of Lagwagon's debut album Duh (the first release from Fat Wreck Chords) and the two follow-up albums Trashed and Hoss. Plourde left Lagwagon in 1995 and was replaced by Dave Raun of RKL.

In 1997, Plourde contacted Kris Roe of The Ataris, who were looking for a rhythm section at the time. The two immediately hit it off and Plourde would stay with the band through the recording of their debut album Anywhere but Here.

Plourde also played with acclaimed Santa Barbara outfit Mad Caddies, and appeared on their 2001 album Rock the Plank.

Later in 2001, Plourde teamed up with his friend and former bandmate Joey Cape in the band Bad Astronaut and played on their first two albums, Acrophobe and Houston: We Have a Drinking Problem. The band also released a third album in 2006, named Twelve Small Steps, One Giant Disappointment, which included several tracks featuring Plourde on drums. After Plourde's death, Cape announced that there would be no more Bad Astronaut albums because "without Derrick, there is no Bad Astronaut".

== Influences and playing style ==
Although Rush's Neil Peart and RKL's Bomer Manzullo are often credited as his biggest influences, Plourde developed his own distinctive sound and style that was considered innovative and fresh in the hardcore/punk music scene. His playing style can best be described as a mixture of fast, complex grooves and fills, often played with a lot of dynamics. Songs like "Move the Car" and "Rifle" by Lagwagon are often considered the best examples of his skill, speed and technique as these songs involved many things that were prominent in Plourde's style such as linear and syncopated drum grooves, fast single strokes and double strokes with both hands and feet. Songs like "Bury the Hatchet", "Mr.Coffee" and "Give It Back" by Lagwagon, all originally recorded with Plourde on drums, are also often cited as examples of his progressive rock influences and outstanding skill and versatility.

== Death and tributes ==
Although the official cause of death and other details were not immediately disclosed, a posting by The Ataris frontman Kris Roe to that band's website confirmed reports that Plourde died from a self-inflicted gunshot wound. On the subject of Plourde's suicide, Joey Cape said that he and others felt like "it's not if, it's when".

Lagwagon produced a tribute album titled Resolve in his honor and made a video for the song "Heartbreaking Music" that consisted almost entirely of different photographs of Plourde along with the footage of the band playing.

The first verse in the lyrics for the NOFX song "Doornails", on their Wolves in Wolves' Clothing album is about Plourde while the song itself is a tribute to punk rock musicians who have died.
