= Jason Sears =

- Jason Sears performing with RKL at Autonomes Kulturzentrum Metzgerstrasse Hanau in 1988

Background information
- Born: Jason Kemper Sears; 23 January 1968
- Died: 31 January 2006 (aged 38)
- Genres: Punk rock; hardcore punk; skate punk; crossover thrash
- Occupation: Singer
- Instrument: Vocals
- Years active: 1982–2006

Jason Kemper Sears (23 January 1968 – 31 January 2006) was an American punk rock vocalist from Santa Barbara, California, best known for his work with Rich Kids on LSD (RKL), from 1982 to their first breakup in 1990 and again from 1993 to 2006. He was also a nationally ranked snowboarder at one time and sponsored by Barfoot snowboarding team.

Sears was one of many singers to contribute to the album Strait Up, made in memory of Lynn Strait, the late lead singer of the band Snot. Sears provided vocals for the track "Until Next Time".

In 2006, Sears died in a detoxification clinic in Tijuana, Mexico, of pulmonary thrombosis unrelated to the treatment. According to Mexican authorities he had been suffering from serious skin abscesses and an infection. He was being treated for addiction with ibogaine, a psychoactive compound with anti-addictive properties that is illegal in the U.S.

Sears is remembered by NOFX in the song "Doornails" from the 2006 album Wolves in Wolves' Clothing, a tribute to punk rock musicians from Southern California who have died. The Sears reference is in the line, "This Patrón's for Jason."
