= Lagwagon =

American punk rock band

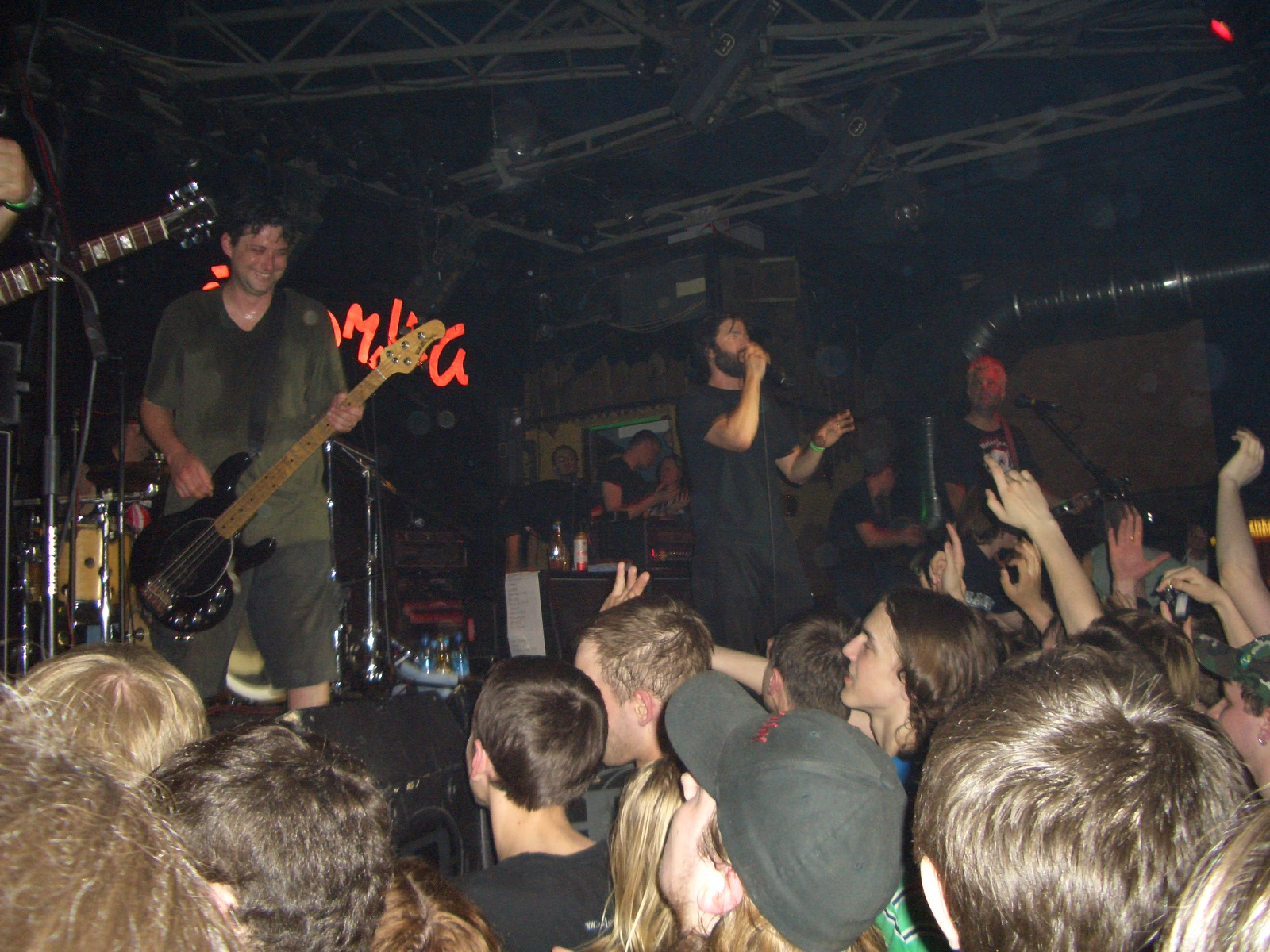
- Lagwagon in 2007

Background information
- Origin: Goleta, California, U.S.
- Genres: Punk rock, skate punk, melodic hardcore
- Years active: 1990–present
- Label: Fat Wreck Chords
- Members: Joey Cape; Chris Flippin; Dave Raun; Chris Rest; Joe Raposo
- Past members: Shawn Dewey; Derrick Plourde; Jesse Buglione; Ken Stringfellow
- Website: lagwagon.com

Lagwagon is an American punk rock band formed in 1990 from Goleta, California, just outside Santa Barbara. Their name comes from the band's tour van, which can be seen on the back cover of their 1994 second album Trashed.

The band has 12 releases through Fat Wreck Chords: nine studio albums, one EP, one live album and a collection of B-sides, compilation tracks and demos. Lagwagon has never had, nor have they seemed to pursue, strong mainstream success, but they do have a devoted underground following in North America, Europe and Asia. Their moderate success reflected a growing interest in punk rock during the 1990s, along with fellow California bands Rancid, Green Day and The Offspring. Their song "May 16" was also featured in Tony Hawk's Pro Skater 2.

== History ==
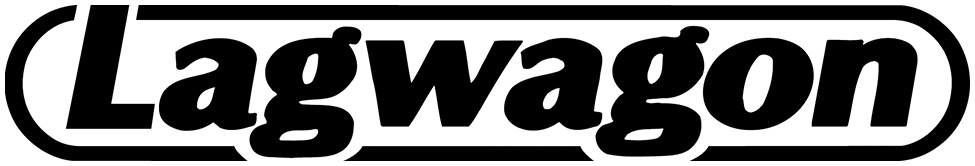
The band's logo

In a 1994 interview, the band's first guitarist Shawn Dewey stated that the band's original members met and formed a band due to each member's individual history with child abuse landing them in the same counseling group: "[The] whole reason this band got together is because we were all neglected children[,] and we all met in a counseling group, we're all about the same age except Jesse [Buglione]. We were all just pretty much beaten by our parents." ( The statements we made in that interview were untrue and, frankly, pretty misleading. We thought we were being funny at the time—turns out we were only being… well, wrong. In hindsight, those remarks weren’t just bad jokes; They caused real harm to the parents of the members involved, and to anyone who has experienced child abuse. That was never our intention, and we take full responsibility for the impact of our words.) Shawn Dewey, former guitarist

Lagwagon originally started under the name Section 8 but were dissatisfied with the name because multiple other bands were already using it. According to the liner notes of the re-release of Duh, it was Fat Mike's idea to switch to Lagwagon based on the already written song of the same name about the band's unreliable touring van. After signing to Fat Mike's label Fat Wreck Chords, Lagwagon released their debut album for the label, Duh, in 1992. Frontman Joey Cape commented on how the album was made, "Back then, we were inexperienced in the studio. It was less about the recording process and more about rehearsing. We recorded and mixed Duh in 4 days. There's something to be said for a budget. You have to have your shit together before you go into the studio and the end result is a record that better reflects the band's sound at the time." Two years later, Lagwagon released Trashed, their second record on Fat, which turned out to be highly successful, leading to the eventual production of a video for "Island of Shame." During this time, a number of punk bands, such as Green Day, The Offspring and Rancid, had hit the mainstream and Lagwagon turned down offers to join several major labels. Hoss, the third Lagwagon album, was released on November 21, 1995. After the release of that album and an extensive tour in Europe, Australia, and Japan, both guitarist Shawn Dewey and drummer Derrick Plourde would leave the band and be replaced temporarily by Kenneth Stringfellow (The Posies) on guitar, and permanently by Dave Raun (RKL) on drums. Shawn Dewey, already in the side project band Buck Wild on Lobster Records would go on to release two full-length LPs, Beat Me Silly and Full Metal Overdrive, and do two European tours with Good Riddance and Ten Foot Pole.

After two more albums, Double Plaidinum and Let's Talk About Feelings, the band went on indefinite hiatus in 2000, due to all members working on side projects. Lagwagon resurfaced in 2002, and released their sixth album Blaze the following year. In 2004, frontman Joey Cape released a split album with No Use for a Name vocalist Tony Sly featuring acoustic versions of songs by both bands. On November 1, 2005, Lagwagon released Resolve, which is a homage to the life of Derrick Plourde, original drummer for Lagwagon and Bad Astronaut.

In 2008, Lagwagon released an EP titled I Think My Older Brother Used to Listen to Lagwagon. Despite earlier reports that the band would begin recording their next full-length studio album by 2009, Lagwagon had gone on hiatus from touring and writing again, due to Cape launching a solo career, releasing Bridge in 2008 and Doesn't Play Well with Others in 2010.

In January 2010, Joey Cape announced during an interview with Canada's Exclaim! magazine that Jesse Buglione had left Lagwagon, having been with the band since its foundation in 1990. However, Cape dismissed rumors of Lagwagon breaking up. While he was not sure if Lagwagon would record a new album or embark on another full-scale tour, he said that he was open to playing shows and possibly recording and releasing new Lagwagon songs sporadically. Jesse Buglione confirmed his departure on Lagwagon's official message board himself, as reported by SputnikMusic and Punknews.org. Lagwagon toured with No Use for a Name that summer. In an interview with fasterlouder.com.au, Cape revealed former RKL bassist Joe Raposo would serve as Lagwagon's new bassist. In a June 2011 interview with ExploreMusic, however, Joey Cape said that the band would not move forward with Raposo as their new bassist, so they would be testing a new bassist. After first announcing Patrick Solem as their new bass player in August 2011, the band later decided that Raposo would remain in the band permanently.

On September 22, 2011, Fat Wreck announced they would be re-issuing expanded editions of the first five albums on CD, vinyl, and digital download. The albums were available both separately and in a box set titled Putting Music In Its Place. The reissues were released November 22, 2011, with a short line-up of concerts in the U.S. played in December and January, and a European tour following in April 2012. Lagwagon headlined a full U.S. tour titled The Fat Tour 2012, with Dead To Me, The Flatliners, and Useless ID as support.

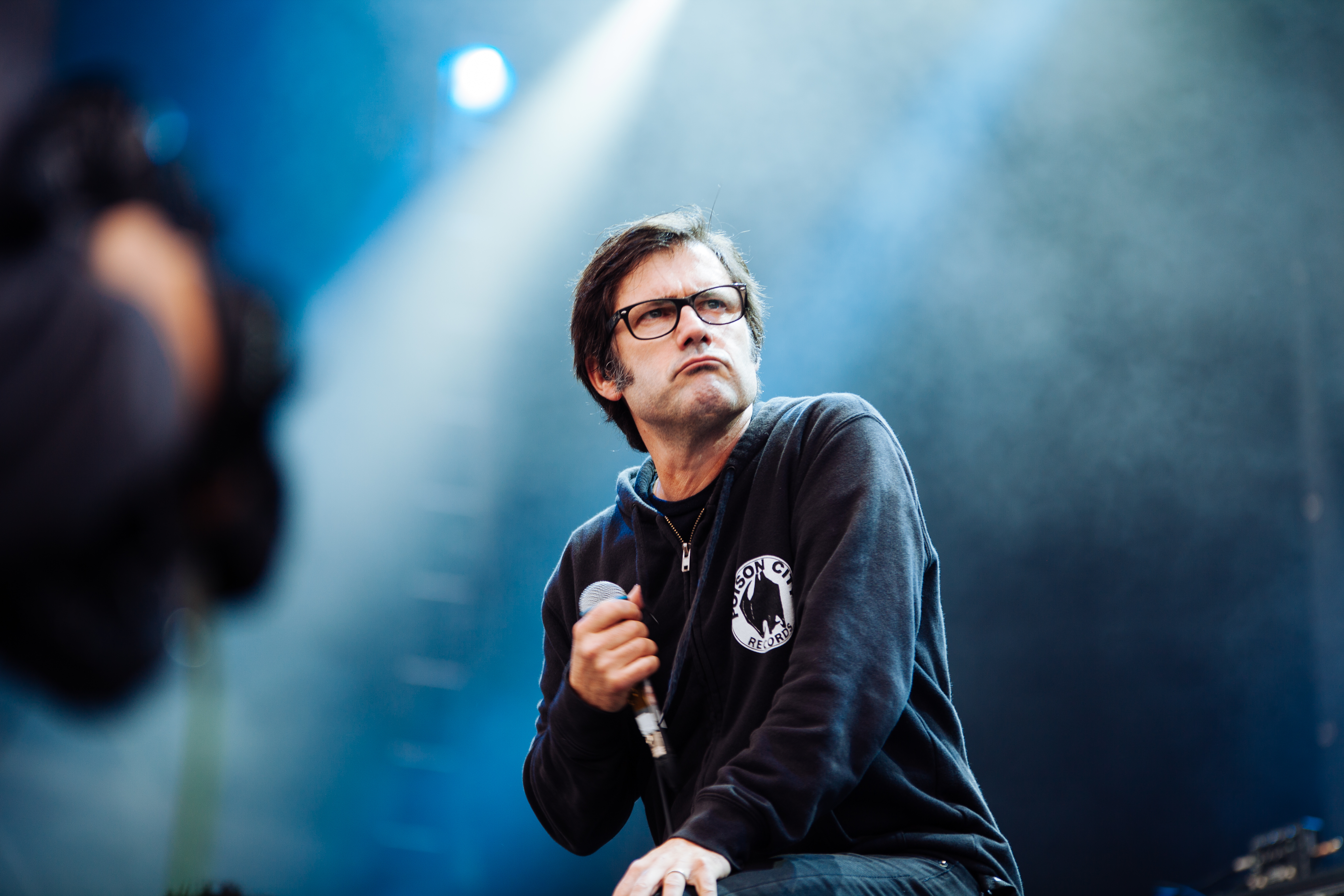
Vocalist Joey Cape performing with Lagwagon in 2014

In October 2012, Joey Cape stated that there would be a new Lagwagon album, which would be their first since 2005's Resolve. While details and release dates were not yet known, the band announced on its Twitter feed that songs were being written for a new album. The September 22 tweet reads, "Writing, writing, writing. New album... It's gonna happen!"

The band recorded their eighth album, Hang, with Bill Stevenson and Jason Livermore at The Blasting Room, Ft Collins, CO. The album was released on October 28, 2014, and debuted at #95 on the Billboard 200.

On October 4, 2019, the band released their ninth studio album Railer, with the lead single being "Bubble". To support the new release, a tour was announced with Face to Face as a co-headlining event.

During late 2024 Jesse would briefly return on bass to cover for Joe, who is currently back in RKL.

== Members ==
=== Current members ===
- Joey Cape – vocals (1990–present)
- Chris Flippin – guitar (1990–present)
- Dave Raun – drums (1996–present)
- Chris Rest – guitar (1997–present)
- Joe Raposo – bass (2010–present)

=== Former members ===
- Derrick Plourde – drums (1990–1996; died 2005)
- Shawn Dewey – guitar (1990–1996)
- Jesse Buglione – bass (1990–2010)
- Ken Stringfellow – guitar (1996–1997)

=== Touring members ===
- Chris Shiflett – guitars (1996)
- Scott Shiflett – guitars (2008)
- John Kraft – drums (2010-2011)
- Lindsay McDougall – guitars (2008, 2023, 2026)

== Discography ==
=== Studio albums ===
Year	Title	Label	Format	Other information
1992	Duh	Fat Wreck Chords	CD/LP	
1994	Trashed	Fat Wreck Chords	CD/LP	
1995	Hoss	Fat Wreck Chords	CD/LP	Last album recorded with guitarist Shawn Dewey and drummer Derrick Plourde.
1997	Double Plaidinum	Fat Wreck Chords	CD/LP	First album recorded with drummer Dave Raun. Only album to feature guitarist Ken Stringfellow
1998	Let's Talk About Feelings	Fat Wreck Chords	CD/LP	First album recorded with guitarist Chris Rest
2003	Blaze	Fat Wreck Chords	CD/LP	
2005	Resolve	Fat Wreck Chords	CD/LP	Last album recorded with bassist Jesse Buglione.
2014	Hang	Fat Wreck Chords	CD/LP	First album recorded with bassist Joe Raposo.
2019	Railer	Fat Wreck Chords	CD/LP	

=== EPs ===
Year	Title	Label	Format	Other information
1992	Tragic Vision b/w Angry Days	Fat Wreck Chords	7"	
1994	Brown Eyed Girl	Hard Records	7"	Split single with Jughead's Revenge
1999	A Feedbag of Truckstop Poetry	Fat Wreck Chords	7"	
2008	I Think My Older Brother Used to Listen to Lagwagon	Fat Wreck Chords	CD/EP	Final recording with bassist Jesse Buglione.

=== Box sets ===
Year	Title	Label	Format	Other information
2011	Putting Music In Its Place	Fat Wreck Chords	CD/LP	Remastered versions of Duh, Trashed, Hoss, Double Plaidinum, and Let's Talk About Feelings (all featuring b-sides, demos and acoustic versions that were partially unreleased before), as well as a Live-DVD.

=== Other releases ===
Year	Title	Label	Format	Other information
2000	Let's Talk About Leftovers	My Records / Fat Wreck Chords	CD/LP	Compilation of rare and previously unreleased tracks.
2005	Live in a Dive	Fat Wreck Chords	CD/LP	Live album

=== Singles and music videos ===
- "Island of Shame" from Trashed
- "Razor Burn" from Hoss
- “Messengers” from Let’s Talk About Feelings
- “E Dagger” from Blaze
- "Falling Apart" from Blaze
- "Heartbreaking Music" from Resolve
- "Made of Broken Parts" from Hang
- "Bubble" from Railer
- "Surviving California" from Railer
- "Stealing Light" from Railer

=== Compilations ===
- "Noble End" on Can of Pork
- "Know-It-All" and "Mr. Coffee" on Fat Music For Fat People
- "Sleep" and "Laymen's Terms" on Survival of the Fattest
- "Raise a Family" on Physical Fatness
- "May 16" on Life in the Fat Lane
- "Alison's Disease" on Live Fat, Die Young
- "Never Stops" on Uncontrollable Fatulence
- "Randal Gets Drunk" on Short Music for Short People
- "Failure" on A Compilation of Warped Music from Double Plaidinum
- "Dinner and a Movie" on Warped Tour 2002 Tour Compilation from Blaze
- "Falling Apart" on Warped Tour 2003 Tour Compilation from Blaze
- "S.O.S. (One Man Army)" on Let Them Know: The Story of Youth Brigade and BYO Records
- "Status Pools" on Rock Against Bush, Vol. 2
- "Violins" on Wrecktrospective from Hoss
- "Discomfort Inn (Tony Sly)" on The Songs of Tony Sly: A Tribute
- "A Feedbag of Truckstop Poetry" on Playing 4 Square
- "Rock ’n’ Roll" on Killed By Deaf: A Punk Tribute to Motörhead
