= Chris Rest =

American guitarist

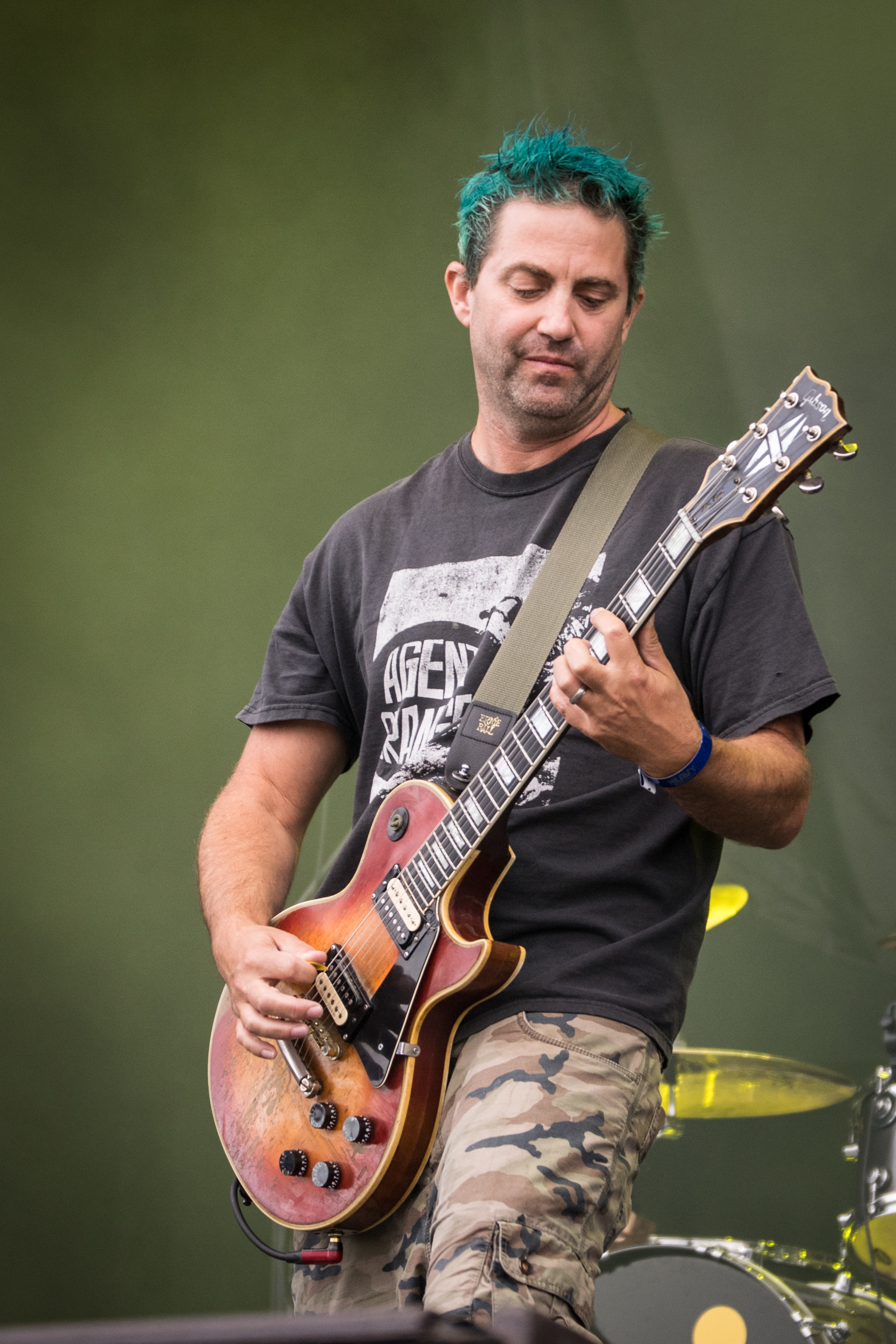
- Rest performing with Lagwagon in 2015

Background information
- Also known as: Leon Rest
- Genres: Punk rock, skate punk, hardcore punk
- Occupation: Musician
- Instrument: Guitar
- Years active: 1983–present

Chris Rest is an American guitarist best known for his work with the punk bands No Use for a Name, Rich Kids on LSD, and Lagwagon. He is Rich Kids on LSD's only constant member, having participated in every album and tour.

== Career ==
Rest was a founding member of hardcore punk band Rich Kids on LSD (RKL) when they formed in 1982. He remained the only consistent throughout the band's entire career. Through their influential career spanning three decades RKL released four full-length studio albums and one live album. RKL went on hiatus in 1995. In 1996 Rest formed a band called The Other with RKL's Bomer Manzullo and drummer Boz Rivera. This group produced one self-titled album released in 1997 on Honest Don's Records, a subsidiary label set up by Fat Wreck Chords to release material by bands that didn't fit within the roster at Fat. That same year Rest played guitar on Buck Wild's album Beat Me Silly. In 1997 Rest replaced guitarist Ken Stringfellow as a member of Lagwagon. Rest has appeared on all subsequent Lagwagon releases. Rest also contributed his guitar on Mad Caddies 2001 release Rock the Plank, and Hotbox's 2001 release Lickety Split.

In 2002 Rest reformed RKL with original members Jason Sears and Bomer Manzullo. The line-up fluctuated over the next few years and new material was being written and recorded, however the death of lead singer Sears in 2006 ended any plans of a release.

Chris Rest is also a member of the San Francisco-based group King City.

Rest contributed guitar to The Real McKenzies's 2008 release Off the Leash and played guitar for the group District of Columbias in 2009. In 2008 he also recorded a guitar solo for the song "Stroudsburg" for the band I Know the Struggle. Rest joined No Use for a Name in 2008 replacing Dave Nassie and remained a member until their final show following the death of lead singer Tony Sly in 2012.
