= Bad Astronaut =

American rock band

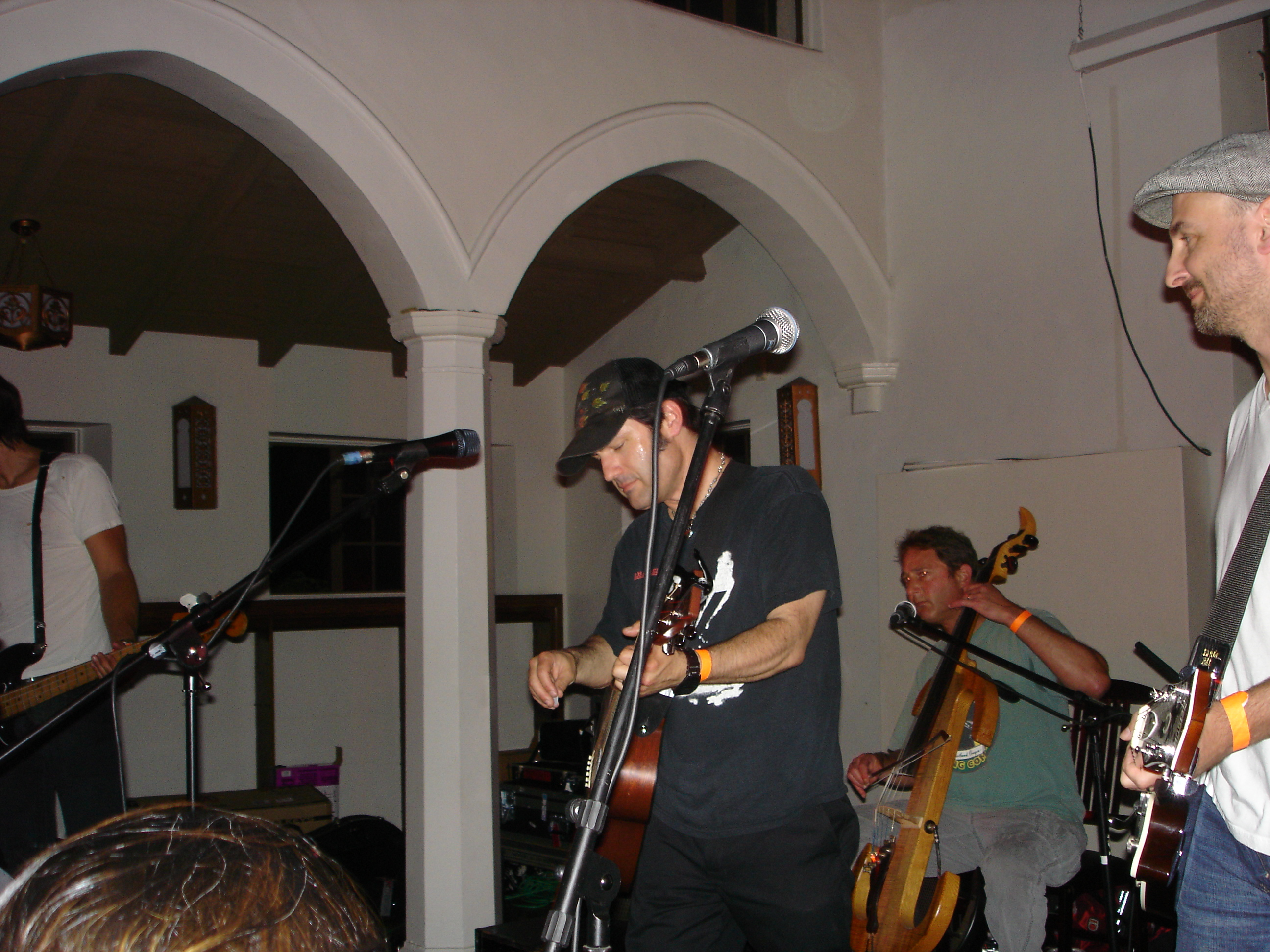
- Bad Astronaut playing at the Center for the Arts in Eagle Rock, California, on July 10, 2010

Background information
- Genres: Indie rock, punk rock, alternative rock
- Years active: 2000–2006, 2010–present
- Labels: Honest Don's; Fat Wreck Chords
- Spinoff of: Lagwagon
- Past members: Joey Cape; Marko DeSantis; Derrick Plourde; Angus Cooke; Thom Flowers; Jonathan Cox; Todd Capps
- Website: www.badastronaut.com

Bad Astronaut is an American indie/alternative rock band founded in 2000 by Joey Cape, singer from Lagwagon. In Bad Astronaut, Joey Cape explores a style of alternative rock, with lyrics often about deep and intricate personal matters.

The band released its debut album, Acrophobe in 2001, followed by Houston: We Have a Drinking Problem in 2002 on Honest Don's Records. The band released its third and final album, Twelve Small Steps, One Giant Disappointment on November 14, 2006, on Fat Wreck Chords. Upon the album's release, Joey Cape announced, "without Derrick, there is no Bad Astronaut" on the band's Myspace page, deciding the resulting record would be the last for Bad Astronaut. (Drummer Derrick Plourde died by suicide in March 2005.) Joey Cape expressed plans on releasing a b-sides album sometime in the future. Bad Astronaut reformed to play their first live shows in July 2010. They played four shows in California, with Mike Hale of In the Red and Joey Cape doing a solo act as the openers. On December 2, 2016, Fat Wreck Chords announced that Erik Herzog had died.

== Band members ==
- Joey Cape – Lead Vocals, Guitar
- Marko DeSantis – Bass
- Derrick Plourde – Drums (deceased)
- Angus Cooke – Cello, Percussion, Vocals
- Thom Flowers – Guitar, Vocals
- Jonathan Cox – Keyboard
- Todd Capps – Keyboard, Vocals
- Erik Herzog – Drums (deceased)

== Discography ==
- War of the Worlds (2001, Owned & Operated – split with Armchair Martian)
- Acrophobe (2001, Honest Don's Records)
- Houston: We Have a Drinking Problem (2002, Honest Don's Records)
- Twelve Small Steps, One Giant Disappointment (2006, Fat Wreck Chords)
- Untethered (2024, Fat Wreck Chords)

== Music videos ==
- "The Passenger" (2002)
