= Joey Cape =

American singer

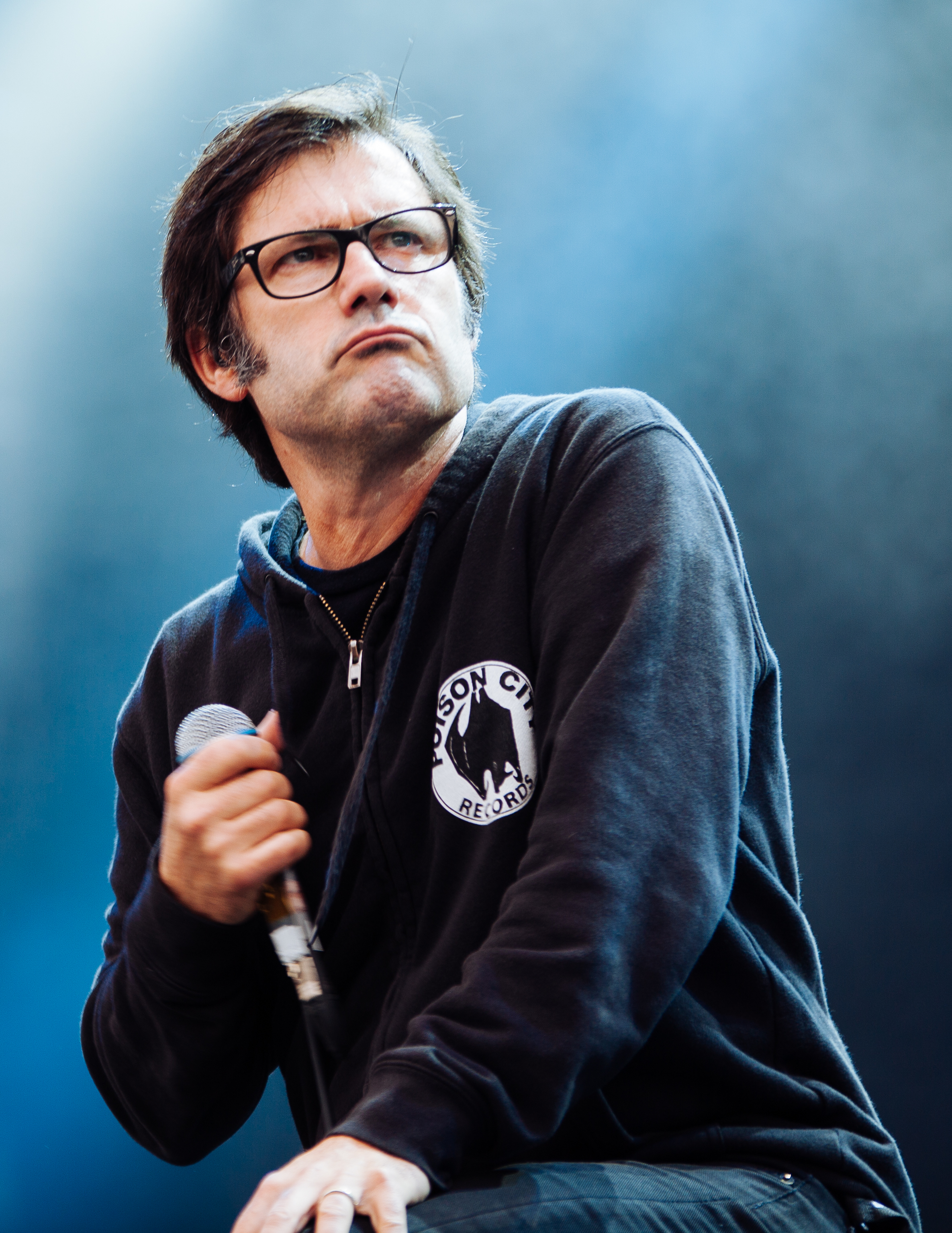
- Joey Cape performing in 2014

Background information
- Born: Randall Joseph Cape; November 16, 1966 (age 59)
- Genres: Punk rock, skate punk, alternative rock, indie rock, folk punk, alternative country
- Occupations: Singer, musician, songwriter
- Instruments: Vocals, guitar
- Years active: 1989–present
- Labels: Fat Wreck Chords, Suburban Home, One Week Records

Randall Joseph Cape (born November 16, 1966) is an American singer and musician. Active since 1989, Cape is best known as the frontman of the California punk rock band Lagwagon.

Cape released his first solo album, Bridge, in 2008. His second album Doesn't Play Well with Others, was self-released in 2011, after he released each song on the album each month of 2010, collecting them all on CD and vinyl in the end of 2010.

== Biography ==
In addition to his work with Lagwagon, he was the lead vocalist for Bad Astronaut until they disbanded due to death of drummer Derrick Plourde and is also a guitarist in the cover band Me First and the Gimme Gimmes. Moreover, Joey Cape released two split albums with Tony Sly of No Use for a Name, featuring acoustic versions of Lagwagon and No Use For a Name songs. Both Cape and Sly also contributed one unreleased/new song to the split. Cape's was titled, 'Violet', a song written for his daughter of the same name. He has also contributed a song called 'Minus' for the album Protect: A Benefit for the National Association to Protect Children.

In 1996, Cape created a record label called My Records that released its debut album, Nerf Herder's self-titled album. My Records is no longer in operation.

From 1999 to 2000, Cape spent the hiatus of Lagwagon working on two side projects: Bad Astronaut and Me First and the Gimme Gimmes. This slowed down Cape's work on Lagwagon until 2002. Cape, with Lagwagon, later released Blaze in 2003 and Resolve in 2005, the latter being a tribute to Lagwagon / Bad Astronaut drummer Derrick Plourde, who killed himself in 2005. They released an EP, I Think My Older Brother Used to Listen to Lagwagon, on August 19, 2008, on Fat Wreck Chords. In October 2014, they released Hang.

Cape has produced records by The Ataris, Ridel High, Nerf Herder and his own bands Lagwagon and Bad Astronaut. He is also involved in a project called Afterburner, working alongside fellow Bad Astronaut Todd Capps, as well as opening a solo Myspace page with new acoustic songs and demos. He has also written songs for and played guitar with a band of old friends called The Playing Favorites. Their first album titled I Remember When I Was Pretty was released on December 4, 2007.

On October 21, 2008, Cape released his first solo acoustic record Bridge on Bad Taste Records in Europe, and on Suburban Home Records in the US.

In August 2009, Cape announced that he was recording material for a second solo acoustic album, titled Doesn't Play Well with Others. In November of the same year, he performed 8 shows alongside Chuck Ragan, Jim Ward, Audra Mae, and Frank Turner as part of The Revival Tour. Cape's album was released throughout 2010, one track at a time, with one song being released by Cape in each month of the year, with the full album with all 12 tracks to be released in January 2011. The album was delayed a few times until it was released on June 1, 2011, on CD and vinyl.

On April 25, 2011, Cape has revealed that he is working on a new band project called Joey Cape's Bad Loud and that he already recorded a full-length album with the band, to feature electric full-band renditions of acoustic songs from his two solo albums Bridge and Doesn't Play Well with Others. The band's debut self-titled album was released on June 9, 2011, on BandCamp.

He is also the founder of One Week Records. A One Week Record is ten songs that are recorded in seven days. The records are produced in his home studio. The artist is invited to his house to eat, drink, sleep and record music for one week. Given the limited schedule, there is no time to overproduce.

== Discography ==
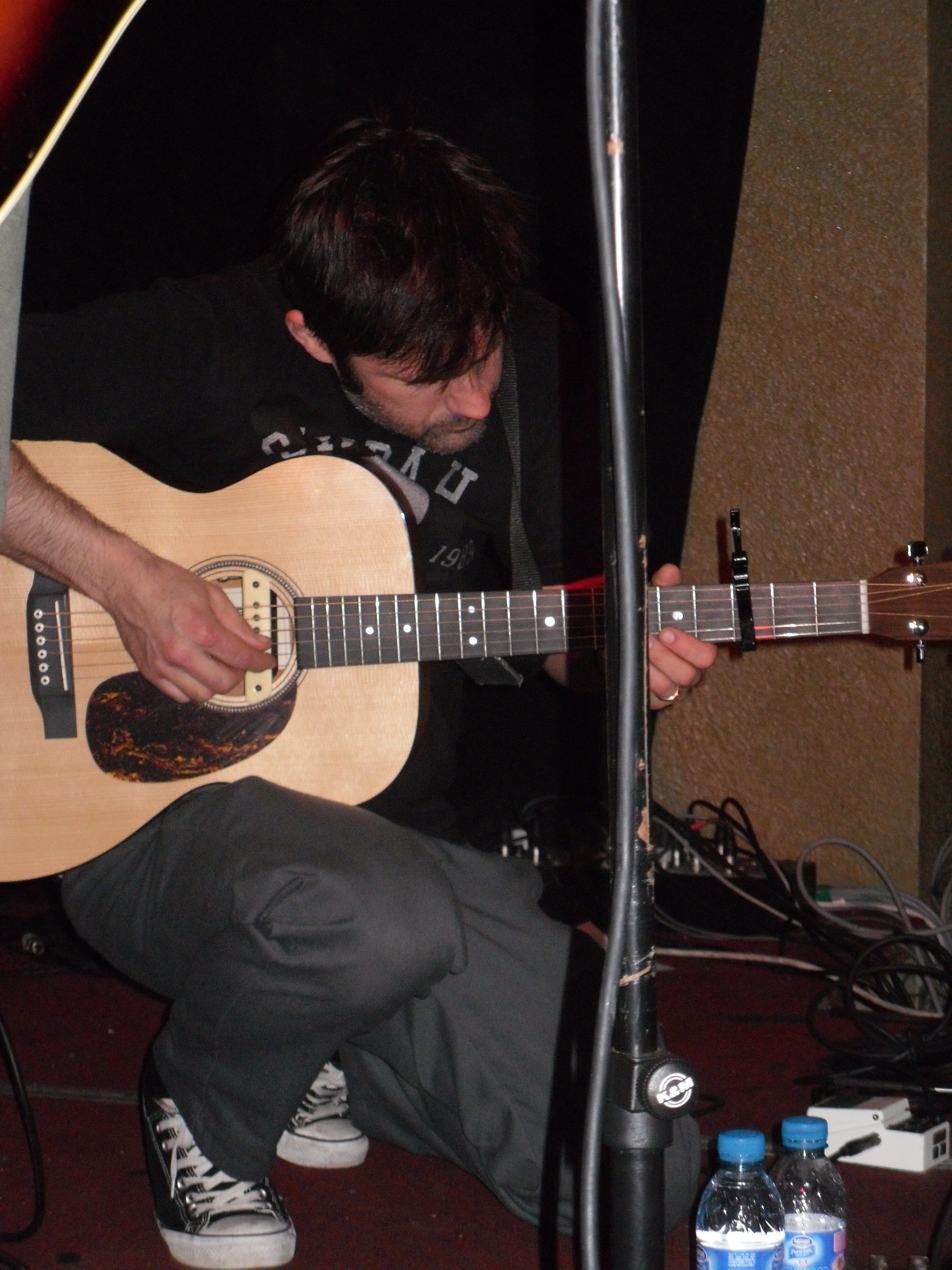
Cape performing solo in 2010

=== Albums ===
- 2008 – Bridge
- 2011 – Doesn't Play Well with Others
- 2015 – Stitch Puppy
- 2016 – One Week Record
- 2019 – Let Me Know When You Give Up
- 2021 – A Good Year to Forget

=== Splits and singles ===
- 2004 – Acoustic (with Tony Sly)
- 2009 – Who Wants to Get Down? (7" with Jon Snodgrass)
- 2009 – Under the Influence, vol. 11 (7" with Mike Hale) – "Watch Me Bleed" (Tears for Fears cover)
- 2010 – Don't Wake Up The Kids!! (with Ken Yokoyama & Duncan Redmonds)
- 2010 – Tony Sly / Joey Cape Split 7" (with Tony Sly)
- 2010 – Liverbirds (with Jon Snodgrass)
- 2012 – Joey Cape / Hugo Mudie & The City Streets – Split (with Hugo Mudie from the Sainte Catherines)
- 2012 – Acoustic Volume 2 (with Tony Sly)
- 2011 – Scorpios (with Tony Sly, Jon Snodgrass, and Brian Wahlstrom)
- 2017 – Scorpios (One Week Record; with Jon Snodgrass, Brian Wahlstrom, and Chris Cresswell)

=== Compilation albums ===
- 2005 – Protect: A Benefit for the National Association to Protect Children
- 2008 – Mission Hall Session
- 2010 – The Revival Tour Collections 2009
