= Me First and the Gimme Gimmes discography =

- Studio albums: 6
- Extended plays: 3
- Live albums: 2
- Compilation albums: 2
- Singles: 18
- Music videos: 4
- Box sets: 1
- Other appearances: 3

Me First and the Gimme Gimmes, a punk rock supergroup cover band, has a discography that consists of six studio albums, three EPs, two live albums, two compilation albums, eighteen singles, one box set, and three music videos.

Me First and the Gimme Gimmes formed in 1995 in California from members of other notable rock bands: Spike Slawson (Swingin' Utters), Chris Shiflett (No Use for a Name, Foo Fighters), Fat Mike (NOFX), and Joey Cape and Dave Raun (Lagwagon). They came together to perform cover songs during off-time from their main acts and did not initially intend to release albums, instead releasing singles named after the artists they had covered and contributing songs to compilation albums. Their first album, Have a Ball, was released in 1997 and began a pattern of themed albums after particular musical genres. Have a Ball covered pop hits of the 1960s and 1970s and was followed by Are a Drag (1999), which covered Broadway show tunes. Blow in the Wind (2001) focused on pop hits of the 1960s, while Take a Break (2003) covered rhythm and blues songs. The band released the live album Ruin Jonny's Bar Mitzvah in 2004 on which they covered karaoke favorites, followed by Love Their Country in 2006 which focused on country and western songs. The compilation album Have Another Ball was released in 2008, consisting of outtakes from the Have a Ball sessions, many of which had appeared on compilations and singles over the years.

== Studio albums ==
Year	Album details	Peak chart positions		
Year	Album details	US		
Year	Album details	Billboard 200	Heatseekers	Independent
1997	Have a Ball: Released: July 29, 1997; Label: Fat Wreck Chords (FAT 554); Format: CD, LP	—	—	—
1999	Are a Drag: Released: May 18, 1999; Label: Fat Wreck Chords (FAT 586); Format: CD, LP	—	—	—
2001	Blow in the Wind: Released: March 20, 2001; Label: Fat Wreck Chords (FAT 620); Format: CD, LP	—	—	14
2003	Take a Break: Released: July 1, 2003; Label: Fat Wreck Chords (FAT 650); Format: CD, LP	131	—	6
2006	Love Their Country: Released: October 17, 2006; Label: Fat Wreck Chords (FAT 712); Format: LP, CD	169	4	12
2014	Are We Not Men? We Are Diva!: Released: May 13, 2014; Label: Fat Wreck Chords (FAT 919); Format: CD, LP	102	—	—
"—" denotes albums that were released but did not chart.

== Live albums ==
Year	Album details	Peak chart positions		
Year	Album details	US		
Year	Album details	Billboard 200	Heatseekers	Independent
2004	Ruin Jonny's Bar Mitzvah: Released: October 5, 2004; Label: Fat Wreck Chords (FAT 674); Formats: CD, LP	197	13	17
2024	¡Blow it...at Madison's Quinceañera!: Released: June 14, 2024; Label: Fat Wreck Chords (FAT117); Formats: CD, LP, MP3	N/A	N/A	N/A

== Compilation albums ==
Year	Album details	Peak chart positions		
Year	Album details	US		
Year	Album details	Billboard 200	Heatseekers	Independent
2008	Have Another Ball: Released: July 8, 2008; Label: Fat Wreck Chords (FAT 729); Formats: CD, LP	163	11	26
2017	Rake it In: The Greatestest Hits: Released: April 7, 2017; Label: Fat Wreck Chords (FAT 975); Formats: CD, LP	—	—	—

== Extended plays ==
Year	Album details
2001	Turn Japanese: Released: February 21, 2001; Label: Pizza of Death (PZCY-2); Format: CD
2011	Go Down Under: Released: February 1, 2011; Label: Fat Wreck Chords (FAT765); Format: CD, EP
2011	Sing in Japanese: Released: September 13, 2011; Label: Fat Wreck Chords (FAT776); Format: CD, EP

== Singles ==
Year	Release details	Tracks	Original performer
1995	Denver: Released: August 26, 1995; Label: Fat Wreck Chords (FAT 531); Format: 7" single	1. "Country Roads"^{[I]}; 2. "Leaving on a Jet Plane"^{[II]}	John Denver
1996	Billy: Released: November 1, 1996; Label: Epitaph (#86485); Format: 7" single	1. "Uptown Girl"^{[II]}; 2. "Only the Good Die Young"^{[I]}	Billy Joel
1997	Paul: Released: 1997; Label: Kung Fu (KFS-7002); Format: 7" single	1. "Me and Julio Down By the Schoolyard"^{[II]}; 2. "Mother and Child Reunion"^{[I]}	Paul Simon
1997	Diamond: Released: 1997; Label: Hopeless (HR 624–7); Format: 7" single	1. "Sweet Caroline"^{[II]}; 2. "America"^{[I]}	Neil Diamond
1997	Barry: Released: 1997; Label: Side One Dummy (S1-10); Format: 7" single	1. "Mandy"^{[II]}; 2. "I Write the Songs"^{[I]}	Barry Manilow
1999	Elton: Released: September 2, 1999; Label: Honest Don's (DON 020); Format: 7" single	1. "Don't Let the Sun Go Down on Me"^{[I]}; 2. "Rocket Man"^{[II]}	Elton John
1999	Garf: Released: 1999; Label: Lookout! (L 219); Format: 7" single	1. "The Boxer"^{[I]}'; 2. "I Am a Rock"^{[II]}	Simon & Garfunkel; Art Garfunkel
1999	In Your Barcalounger: Released: 1999; Label: Alternative Tentacles (VIRUS 226); Format: 7" single	1. "Fire and Rain"^{[II]}; 2. "You've Got a Friend"^{[I]}	James Taylor
2001	Shannon: Released: 2001; Label: BYO (BYO-71); Format: 7" single	1. "Runaway"; 2. "Hats Off to Larry"	Del Shannon
2001	Stevens: Released: 2001; Label: Nitro (NR-15841); Format: 7" single	1. "Father and Son"; 2. "Wild World"	Cat Stevens
2001	Bob^{[III]}: Released: November 27, 2001; Label: Fat Wreck Chords; Format: 7" single	1. "Blowin' in the Wind"; 2. "The Times They Are A-Changing"	Bob Dylan
2003	Jackson: Released: 2003; Label: Jade Tree (JT 1086); Format: 7" single	1. "Ben"; 2. "I'll Be There"	Michael Jackson; The Jackson 5
2003	Stevie: Released: September 1, 2003; Label: No Idea (NIR 148); Format: 7" single	1. "I Just Called to Say I Love You"; 2. "Isn't She Lovely"	Stevie Wonder
2007	Dolly^{[IV]}: Released: October 16, 2007; Label: Fat Wreck Chords (FAT 227); Format: 7" single	1. "Jolene"; 2. "I Will Always Love You"	Dolly Parton
2007	Cash^{[IV]}: Released: November 6, 2007; Label: Fat Wreck Chords (FAT 228); Format: 7" single	1. "Sunday Morning Coming Down"; 2. "I Still Miss Someone"	Johnny Cash
2007	Willie^{[IV]}: Released: December 11, 2007; Label: Fat Wreck Chords (FAT 229); Format: 7" single	1. "On the Road Again"; 2. "City of New Orleans"	Willie Nelson
2008	Kenny^{[IV]}: Released: January 22, 2008; Label: Fat Wreck Chords (FAT 230); Format: 7" single	1. "She Believes in Me" ('05 version); 2. "Lady"	Kenny Rogers
2008	Jerry^{[IV]}: Released: March 4, 2008; Label: Fat Wreck Chords (FAT 231); Format: 7" single	1. "East Bound and Down" (rough mix); 2. "I'm Gonna Write a Song"	Jerry Reed

I Denotes tracks that were re-released on Have Another Ball.

II Denotes tracks that were also released on Have a Ball.

III Bob is exclusive to the Me First and the Gimme Gimmes box set and was not released separately.

IV Dolly, Cash, Willie, Kenny, and Jerry comprise the "Square Dance Series", so named because the first pressing of each was on square-shaped vinyl. The A side tracks on each are songs from Love Their Country, while the B side tracks are outtakes from the album sessions.

== Music videos ==
Year	Title	Director	Album
1997	"Danny's Song"		Have a Ball
1999	"Summertime"		Are a Drag
2003	"I Believe I Can Fly"		Take a Break
2006	"Goodbye Earl"		Love Their Country
2026	"We Are The World"	Josh Roush	Shit The Bed

== Box sets ==
Year	Details	Pressings and contents
2001	Me First and the Gimme Gimmes: Released: November 27, 2001; Label: Fat Wreck Chords; Format: 11 7" vinyl set in a bowling bag.	500 copies produced; now out of print.; Contains the singles Denver, Billy, Paul, Diamond, Barry, Elton, Garf, In Your Barkalounger, Shannon, Stevens, and Bob, as well as stickers, pins, and beer coasters. Packaged in a bowling bag.; Bob was a new release exclusive to this set.

== Other appearances ==
The following Me First and the Gimme Gimmes songs were released on compilation albums, soundtracks, and other releases. Some songs were later re-released on albums, as noted below. This is not an exhaustive list: songs that were first released on the band's albums, EPs, or singles are not included.

Year	Release details	Tracks	Original performer
2000	Happy Meals, Vol. 2: The Perfect Marriage: Released: 2000; Label: Honest Don's; Format: CD	"Rich Girl"^{[I]}	Hall & Oates
2002	Uncontrollable Fatulence: Released: November 19, 2002; Label: Fat Wreck Chords (FAT 646); Format: CD, LP	"Nothing Compares 2 U"^{[II]}	The Family
2003	Warped Tour 2003 Tour Compilation: Released: June 3, 2003; Label: Side One Dummy; Format: CD	"The Harder They Come"^{[I]}	Jimmy Cliff

I Denotes songs that were re-released on Have Another Ball.

II "Nothing Compares 2 U" was included on Take a Break in 2003.
