= Rake It In: The Greatestest Hits =

Compilation album by Me First and the Gimme Gimmes
- Released: April 7, 2017
- Recorded: 1995–2014
- Genre: Punk rock
- Length: 39:37
- Label: Fat Wreck Chords

Me First and the Gimme Gimmes chronology
Are We Not Men? We Are Diva! (2014)	Rake It In: The Greatestest Hits (2017)	¡Blow it…at Madison’s Quinceañera! (2024)

Rake It In: The Greatestest Hits is a greatest hits album by the punk rock supergroup Me First and the Gimme Gimmes. It was released on April 7, 2017, on Fat Wreck Chords. The album has songs from throughout their career, from their first release, the "Denver" 7" in 1995, to their last, Are We Not Men? We Are Diva! in 2014. The track selection was based on the live set list the band had developed over the course of its career.

In March 2017, the band released a track from the album, a cover of "City of New Orleans", which had previously only been available on vinyl.

== Critical reception ==
Professional ratings
Review scores
Source	Rating
Maximum Rocknroll	(favorable)
Maximum Rocknroll	(unfavorable)
New Noise	3.5/5 stars
Paste	8.6/10 stars
PunkNews.org	2.5/5 stars

Will Hodge, writing in Paste, said that the album was a perfect distillation of the band's career, and demonstrated how adept they were at keeping their music sounding fresh despite being a cover band. Philip Fairbanks of New Noise Magazine was similarly positive, describing the album as "frenetic" and "irresistibly satisfying". Julie River of PunkNews.org found that the album was not a good reflection of the band's career, and particularly decried the exclusion of Rocket Man, which had previously appeared on the album Have a Ball. Maximum Rocknroll published a pair of dueling reviews: the first, by Ramsey Kanaan, praised the record out of a general appreciation of the band's work, while reviewer Kenny Kaos said he was "not really sure what the point is" of the compilation album or of the band's existence in general.

== Track listing ==
No.	Title	Writer(s)	Original performer/Musical	Length
1.	"The Times They Are a-Changin'"	Bob Dylan	Bob Dylan	2:05
2.	"Rainbow Connection"	Paul Williams, Kenneth Ascher	The Muppet Movie	2:20
3.	"City of New Orleans"	Steve Goodman	Steve Goodman (made famous by Arlo Guthrie and Willie Nelson)	3:04
4.	"Summertime"	DuBose Heyward, Dorothy Heyward, Ira Gershwin, George Gershwin	Porgy and Bess	2:10
5.	"All My Loving"	John Lennon, Paul McCartney	The Beatles	1:56
6.	"Straight Up"	Elliot Wolff	Paula Abdul	2:59
7.	"Over the Rainbow"	E. Y. Harburg, Harold Arlen	The Wizard of Oz	1:33
8.	"Country Roads"	John Denver, Bill Danoff, Taffy Nivert	John Denver	2:09
9.	"Sloop John B"	Traditional, arranged by Brian Wilson	The Beach Boys	2:08
10.	"Jolene"	Dolly Parton	Dolly Parton	1:48
11.	"Uptown Girl"	Billy Joel	Billy Joel	2:21
12.	"Hats Off to Larry"	Del Shannon	Del Shannon	2:21
13.	"Desperado"	Glenn Frey, Don Henley	Eagles	2:28
14.	"Lady"	Lionel Richie	Kenny Rogers	2:22
15.	"San Francisco"	John Phillips	Scott McKenzie	1:49
16.	"I Believe I Can Fly"	R. Kelly	R. Kelly	3:03
17.	"End of the Road"	Kenneth "Babyface" Edmonds, Antonio "L.A." Reid, Daryl Simmons	Boyz II Men	3:00

== Track origins ==
- Track 1 originally appeared on Turn Japanese EP (2001) and on Bob 7" (2001)
- Tracks 2, 4 and 7 originally appeared on Are a Drag (1999)
- Track 3 originally appeared on Willie 7" (2007)
- Tracks 5, 9 and 15 originally appeared on Blow in the Wind (2001)
- Track 6 originally appeared on Are We Not Men? We Are Diva! (2014)
- Track 8 originally appeared on Denver 7" (1995) and later Have Another Ball (2008)
- Tracks 10 and 13 originally appeared on Love Their Country (2006)
- Track 11 originally appeared on Billy 7" (1996) and later Have a Ball (1997)
- Track 12 originally appeared on Shannon 7" (2001)
- Track 14 originally appeared on Kenny 7" (2008)
- Tracks 16 and 17 originally appeared on Take a Break (2003)

== Personnel ==
- Spike Slawson – vocals
- Chris Shiflett (a.k.a. Jake Jackson) – lead guitar
- Joey Cape – rhythm guitar
- Fat Mike – bass guitar
- Dave Raun – drums
