= Blow it...at Madison's Quinceañera! =

2024 album by the punk supergroup "Me First and the Gimme Gimmes"

¡Blow it… at Madison's Quinceañera!

Live album by Me First and the Gimme Gimmes
- Released: 2024
- Recorded: July 15. 2023
- Venues: The Soap Factory, San Diego
- Genre: Punk rock
- Label: Fat Wreck Chords

Me First and the Gimme Gimmes chronology
Rake it In: The Greatestest Hits (2017)	¡Blow it… at Madison's Quinceañera! (2024)	Shit the Bed (2026)

¡Blow it...at Madison's Quinceañera! is the twelfth album by Me First and the Gimme Gimmes, released in 2024 on the Fat Wreck Chords independent record label. The album is unusual for the band in that it has no overarching theme, but does feature a number of songs in Spanish. The album is a live recording at a real Quinceañera celebration on July 15, 2023, at the Soap Factory, San Diego. The band performed as a surprise guest to an audience unfamiliar with their music, echoing their earlier concept from the 2004 live album Ruin Jonny's Bar Mitzvah.

== Track listing ==
The album features 13 punk rock covers of songs spanning multiple decades and languages:

No.	Title	Writer(s)	Original performer	Length
1.	"Changes"	Black Sabbath	Black Sabbath
2.	"Love Will Keep Us Together" (Contains an interpolation of "Love Will Tear Us Apart" by Joy Division sung in Spanish)	Neil Sedaka	Captain & Tennille
3.	"Dancing Queen" (Contains an interpolation of "Janie Jones" by The Clash)	ABBA	ABBA
4.	"I Could Fall in Love"	Keith Thomas	Selena
5.	"Estos Celos"	Joan Sebastian	Joan Sebastian
6.	"La Última muñeca" (Audio of traditional practice.)
7.	"Happy Birthday to You" (Sung in Spanish and English)	Patty Hill	Trad.
8.	"Por Tu Maldito Amor"	Vicente Fernández	Vicente Fernández
9.	"Good 4 U" (Contains an interpolation of "Ever Fallen in Love (With Someone You Shouldn't've)" by The Buzzcocks)	Olivia Rodrigo	Olivia Rodrigo
10.	"Queen of Hearts"	Hank DeVito	Juice Newton
11.	"Camino de Guanajuato"	José Alfredo Jiménez	José Alfredo Jiménez
12.	"Before the Next Teardrop Falls"	Vivian Keith, Ben Peters	Freddy Fender
13.	"De Niña a Mujer"	J. Iglesias, C. Enterria, T. Renis, R. Arcusa	Julio Iglesias

== Release and reception ==
The first single, a cover of ABBA’s "Dancing Queen", was released on April 9, 2024. A second single, a punk rendition of Olivia Rodrigo’s "Good 4 U", followed in May 2024.

Punk Rock Theory gave the album a 4 out of 5 rating, praising its humorous concept and tight musicianship despite the spontaneous setting.

== Personnel ==
- Spike Slawson – vocals
- John Reis – lead guitar
- Joey Cape – rhythm guitar
- CJ Ramone – bass
- Andrew "Pinch" Pinching – drums

== Tour ==
To support the album, Me First and the Gimme Gimmes embarked on a North American tour in spring 2024, followed by European dates in summer 2024.

== See also ==
- Me First and the Gimme Gimmes discography
