= Shiflett =

Shiflett may refer to:

- Chris Shiflett (born 1971), lead guitarist for the rock band Foo Fighters
- Scott Shiflett (1966), bassist
- Shiflett Brothers, Texas-based sculptors working in the comic book and gaming industries

== See also ==
- Chris Shiflett & the Dead Peasants, the debut self-titled album from Chris Shiflett, lead guitarist of Foo Fighters
