= Uke-Hunt =

American band

- Origin: San Francisco, California
- Genre: Folk music
- Years active: 2013–present
- Label: Fat Wreck Chords
- Members: Spike Slawson; Randy Burk; Jamin Barton; Joe Raposo

Uke-Hunt is a ukulele-based cover band fronted by Spike Slawson from Me First and the Gimme Gimmes. Although both this and the Gimmes are cover bands, they have very different approaches. While the Gimmes generally pick non-rock songs, rock them out and speed them up to turn them into punk music, the songs picked for this band are generally upbeat songs that are then slowed down and mellowed out.

== History ==
The band's origins start with Slawson learning to play ukulele when Me First and the Gimme Gimmes would perform their cover of R. Kelly's "I Believe I Can Fly" live. Slawson would then learn different songs on ukulele which led to this band. The band initially played on the San Francisco Wharf under the name Uke Hammer. The band was initially made up of Slawson on ukulele and vocals, Randy Burk on percussion and vocals and Jamin Barton on various instruments, including saxophone, melodica and harmonica.

The band first appeared on the 2013 Fat Music for Fest People III compilation before releasing their debut single, "The Prettiest Star", in April 2014, followed by their debut, self-titled album in June 2014. The following year, the band went on their first national tour.

== Members ==
- Spike Slawson – lead vocals
- Jamin Barton - saw, saxophone
- Randy Burk - percussion
- Joe Raposo - bass

== Discography ==
=== "The Prettiest Star" 7" (2014) ===
"The Prettiest Star"

Single by Uke-Hunt

from the album Uke-Hunt
- B-side: "Ben"
- Released: April 29, 2014
- Length: 2:50
- Label: Fat Wreck Chords
- Songwriter: David Bowie

"The Prettiest Star" was the first release by the band. It was released on April 29, 2014 by Fat Wreck Chords.

==== Track listing ====
No.	Title	Writer(s)	Original artist	Length
1.	"The Prettiest Star"	David Bowie	David Bowie	2:50
2.	"Ben"	Donald Black/Walter Scharf	Michael Jackson	2:04

=== Uke-Hunt (2014) ===
Uke-Hunt

Studio album by Uke-Hunt
- Released: June 10, 2014
- Length: 25:38
- Label: Fat Wreck Chords

Uke-Hunt is the debut album by the band. It was released on June 10, 2014 by Fat Wreck Chords.

==== Track listing ====
No.	Title	Writer(s)	Original artist	Length
1.	"Because"	Dave Clark	The Dave Clark Five	2:20
2.	"Animal Farm"	Ray Davies	The Kinks	2:41
3.	"End of the World"	Arthur Kent/Sylvia Dee	Skeeter Davis	2:34
4.	"Green, Green Grass of Home"	Claude Putman Jr.	Johnny Darrell	2:14
5.	"Enjoy the Silence"	Martin Gore	Depeche Mode	2:19
6.	"Needles and Pins"	Jack Nitzsche/Sonny Bono	Jackie DeShannon	1:59
7.	"The Prettiest Star"	David Bowie	David Bowie	2:50
8.	"Fascination"	Fermo Dante Marchetti/Maurice de Féraudy	N/A	2:29
9.	"Rainy Days and Mondays"	Paul Williams/Roger Nichols	The Carpenters	3:14
10.	"Ready to Take a Chance Again"	Charles Fox/Normal Gimbel	Barry Manilow	3:03

=== Compilation appearances ===
The following releases feature songs by the band.

- Fat Music for Fest People III (2013, Fat Wreck Chords)
  - Features "Animal Farm", later released on Uke-Hunt
- Fat Music for Fest People IV (2014, Fat Wreck Chords)
  - Features "Needles and Pins" from Uke-Hunt
- Mild in the Streets: Fat Music Unplugged (2016, Fat Wreck Chords)
  - Features the exclusive "Xanadu"
