= Dougie Padilla =

American poet and visual artist (born 1948)

- Born: July 28, 1948 (age 78); St. Louis Park, Minnesota, U.S.
- Occupations: Poet; multimedia visual artist; activist
- Years active: 1960s–present
- Known for: Chicano movement activism; co-founding Art-a-Whirl; founding Grupo Soap del Corazón
- Notable work: River Town; Pepin Diaries; Grupo Soap del Corazón projects
- Style: Día de Los Muertos; multimedia
- Movement: Chicano Movement; Mythopoetic men's movement

Dougie Padilla (born July 28, 1948) is an American poet, multimedia visual artist, and activist of Norwegian and Mexican descent. He works in Minneapolis, Minnesota, and Pepin, Wisconsin. Padilla has participated in Chicano cultural activism and community-based art projects in the Upper Midwest since the late 1960s.

Padilla is a co-founder of Art-a-Whirl, an annual open-studio event in Northeast Minneapolis, and a founding member of the traveling art collective "Grupo Soap del Corazón." His work includes poetry, visual art, and collaborative projects, engaging with themes of identity, ritual, and community history.

== Early life ==
Padilla studied piano and French horn as a child. By age 11, he was able to sight-sing Bach cantatas.

Padilla attended Lake Forest College for two years, where he became involved in activism through marches, picketing, and protests. During this time, he connected with Chicano poet and activist Corky Gonzales and other Chicano leaders. In the late 1960s, he worked with Reies Tijerina’s Alianza in New Mexico, furthering his involvement in the Chicano Movement.

In 1968, Padilla moved to California and participated in social and cultural movements in San Francisco and Berkeley. Following a health issue at age 20, he studied under Ram Dass, Swami Muktananda, and Suzuki Roshi.

== Artistic inspiration and style ==
Padilla's work draws inspiration from Día de los Muertos and the ritual practices of Native American and African spiritual practitioners. His visual art frequently incorporates Calaveras, a traditional Mexican symbol used in Día de los Muertos.

== Major works ==
=== Grupo Soap del Corazón ===
In 2000, Padilla and Xavier Tavera co-created the community art group Grupo Soap del Corazón. The group includes artists from various ethnic backgrounds and origins, such as Latino, Native American, African, and Euro-American. The collective creates mobile artwork intended for various community contexts. As of 2024, the group includes approximately 90 artists.

In 2006, the group showcased two exhibitions in Valparaíso, Chile, including "El Otro Americano (The Other American)" at El Instituto Chileno Norteamericano de Cultura. The group also worked on the "Pepin Portrait Project," photographing residents of rural Pepin, Wisconsin. In 2021, Grupo Soap del Corazón published a zine, Fabulista 2. It featured themes related to the struggles of Chicano and Latinx people and addressed the political uprising of the summer of 2020 following the murder of George Floyd.

In 2024, Tavera and Padilla curated an exhibition at the Minnesota Museum of American Art featuring works by fifteen Latinx visual artists. The exhibit, "Hilo de la Sangre" (Thread of the Blood), featured topics such as blood as the "foundation of life," complex lineage, and the cultural symbols of sacrifice and atonement.

=== Poetry ===
In 2019, Padilla published two poetry chapbooks, River Town and Pepin Diary, with Luna Brava Press.

== Personal life ==
As of 2021, Padilla lives in the Northeast Minneapolis Arts District and commutes to his studio, Dougieland Pepin, in Pepin, Wisconsin. Padilla is married to Susan Jacobsen and is a father, grandfather, and great-grandfather.
