= Northeast Minneapolis Arts Association =

American nonprofit organization

The Northeast Minneapolis Arts Association (or NEMAA) is a 501(c)(3) non-profit organization of working artists and allies based in Northeast Minneapolis, in the U.S. state of Minnesota.

Founded by a small collective of artists in 1995, today NEMAA has more than 1,000 members including artists, students, community friends, non-profit organizations, art galleries, and business members. NEMAA's most visible event is Art-A-Whirl, the largest annual open artist studio tour in the U.S., held since 1996 and partially founded by Dougie Padilla, a Chicano poet, multimedia visual artist. During the event artists open their studios to the public, and other performing, visual and educational groups have special art events all around the neighborhoods of Northeast. In 2017, more than 600 artists in 50 locations participated.

NEMAA publishes an annual Artist Directory and Guide, a year-round guide for visitors to Northeast Minneapolis, Art-A-Whirl, and other arts happenings. Since 2019, NEMAA also produces the NEMAA 10x10 online member art show and fundraiser. In addition, NEMAA promotes members, artists, and events year-round, including monthly open studio events.

NEMAA was instrumental in establishing the Northeast Minneapolis Arts District in 2003, with the Mississippi River on the west, Broadway Street on the south, Central Avenue on the east, and 27th Avenue on the north.
