= Ruin Jonny's Bar Mitzvah =

2004 live album by Me First and the Gimme Gimmes

Live album by Me First and the Gimme Gimmes
- Released: October 19, 2004
- Recorded: October 25, 2003
- Genre: Punk rock
- Length: 46:36
- Label: Fat Wreck Chords
- Producer: Ryan Greene

Me First and the Gimme Gimmes chronology
Take a Break (2003)	Ruin Jonny's Bar Mitzvah (2004)	Love Their Country (2006)

Ruin Jonny's Bar Mitzvah is a live album by Me First and the Gimme Gimmes, released on October 19, 2004, on Fat Wreck Chords.

It was recorded live at an actual bar mitzvah party, and its runtime lasts their entire performance, including a break in which little can be heard other than the sounds of party guests wandering around and chatting amongst themselves. Jonny Wixen, the Bar Mitzvah boy, plays drums on one of the hidden tracks that are on the final track. The CD comes with footage of the bar mitzvah.

The album is almost entirely made up of songs that have not appeared on previous albums. The only exceptions are two hidden tracks: "Seasons in the Sun" from Have a Ball (1997) and "Sloop John B" from Blow in the Wind (2001).

== Track listing ==
No.	Title	Writer(s)	Original performer	Length
1.	"Jonny's Blessing"			1:04
2.	"Stairway to Heaven"	Jimmy Page, Robert Plant	Led Zeppelin	2:33
3.	"Heart of Glass"	Debbie Harry, Chris Stein	Blondie	2:43
4.	"Delta Dawn"	Larry Collins	Tanya Tucker	2:41
5.	"Come Sail Away"	Dennis DeYoung	Styx	2:48
6.	"'O Sole Mio"	traditional		2:19
7.	"Strawberry Fields Forever"	John Lennon, Paul McCartney	The Beatles	2:57
8.	"Auld Lang Syne"	traditional		1:49
9.	"The Longest Time" (contains an interpolation of "Suspect Device" by Stiff Little Fingers, written by Jake Burns and Gordon Ogilvie)	Billy Joel	Billy Joel	2:30
10.	"On My Mind"	Johnny Christopher, Mark James, Wayne Carson Thompson	Brenda Lee, Elvis Presley, Willie Nelson, Pet Shop Boys	2:36
11.	"Take It on the Run"	Gary Richrath	REO Speedwagon	2:44
12.	"Superstar" (contains an interpolation of "Kids of the Black Hole" by The Adolescents)	Bonnie Bramlett, Leon Russell	Delaney and Bonnie	3:21
13.	"Hava Nagila" (contains an interpolation of "Come Out and Play" by The Offspring, written by Dexter Holland)	traditional		3:41
14.	"Hava Nagila (Christmas Arrangement)" (contains an interpolation of "Feliz Navidad" by José Feliciano)	traditional		12:53
15.	"Seasons in the Sun" (featuring Uncle Roger)	Jacques Brel, Rod McKuen	The Kingston Trio (made famous by Terry Jacks), in turn an English adaptation of "Le Moribond" by Brel	2:27
16.	"Sloop John B" (featuring Jonny Wixen; contains an interpolation of "Teenage Lobotomy" by the Ramones, written by Dee Dee Ramone)	Traditional, arranged by Brian Wilson	The Beach Boys	2:09

== Personnel ==
- Spike Slawson – vocals
- Chris Shiflett (a.k.a. Jake Jackson) – lead guitar, ukulele
- Joey Cape – rhythm guitar
- Fat Mike – bass
- Dave Raun – drums

=== Additional musicians ===
- Jonny Wixen (the Bar Mitzvah boy) – drums on hidden track #16 ("Sloop John B") and spoken word vocals (Hebrew blessing) on opening track #1 "Jonny's Blessing"
- Uncle Roger (a party guest) – French vocals on hidden track #15 ("Seasons In The Sun")

== Critical reception ==
Professional ratings
Review scores
Source	Rating
Allmusic	4/5 stars
Des Moines Register	3.5/5 stars
Punknews.org	3.5/5 stars
Reno Gazette-Journal	1.5/4 stars
Rolling Stone	3/5 stars

Giving the album three stars, David Swanson with Rolling Stone magazine said the band members "revel in kitsch and irony", adding "What's not to like?"
