= Have Another Ball =

Compilation album by Me First and the Gimme Gimmes
- Released: July 8, 2008
- Recorded: 1996–2008
- Genre: Punk rock
- Length: 28:29
- Label: Fat Wreck Chords

Me First and the Gimme Gimmes chronology
Love Their Country (2006)	Have Another Ball (2008)	Go Down Under (2011)

Professional ratings
Review scores
Source	Rating
AbsolutePunk.net	(85%) link
Allmusic	link
Kerrang!	3/5 stars

Have Another Ball is a compilation album by the punk rock cover band Me First and the Gimme Gimmes. It is their seventh album overall, and was released on July 8, 2008 by Fat Wreck Chords.

The album features songs dating back to before their first album, Have a Ball. Many of the tracks were previously released on now out-of-print 7" vinyl singles, while others were featured on compilation albums.

== Track listing ==
No.	Title	Writer(s)	Original performer	Length
1.	"Rich Girl" (from Happy Meals, Vol. 2: The Perfect Marriage)	Daryl Hall	Hall & Oates	2:06
2.	"The Boxer" (from Garf)	Paul Simon	Simon and Garfunkel	2:49
3.	"Country Roads" (from Denver)	John Denver, Bill Danoff, Taffy Nivert	John Denver	2:10
4.	"I Write the Songs" (from Barry)	Bruce Johnston	Barry Manilow	2:57
5.	"Sodomy"	Galt MacDermot, James Rado, Gerome Ragni	Hair cast (musical)	0:28
6.	"You've Got a Friend" (from In Your Barkalounger (contains an interpretation of "Blitzkrieg Bop" by The Ramones))	Carole King	James Taylor	2:35
7.	"Mahogany" (contains an interpretation of "Richie Dagger's Crime" by the Germs)	Michael Masser, Gerald Goffin	Diana Ross	1:50
8.	"Mother and Child Reunion" (from Paul)	Paul Simon	Paul Simon	2:10
9.	"Only the Good Die Young" (from Billy)	Billy Joel	Billy Joel	2:47
10.	"Coming to America" (from Diamond)	Neil Diamond	Neil Diamond	2:24
11.	"The Harder They Come" (from the Warped Tour 2003 Tour Compilation)	Jimmy Cliff	Jimmy Cliff	2:25
12.	"Don't Let the Sun Go Down on Me" (from Elton)	Elton John, Bernie Taupin	Elton John	3:48

== Personnel ==
- Spike Slawson – vocals
- Chris Shiflett (a.k.a. Jake Jackson) – lead guitar
- Joey Cape – rhythm guitar
- Fat Mike – bass
- Dave Raun – drums
- Billie Joe Armstrong – backing vocals on "Coming to America"
- Danny Vapids – backing vocals on "Coming to America"
- Ron Weltner – backing vocals on "Coming to America"

== See also ==
- Me First and the Gimme Gimmes discography
