= Xavier Tavera Castro =

Mexican photographer & artist (born 1971)

- Born: Mexico City, Mexico
- Education: Minneapolis College of Art and Design
- Known for: Photography
- Website: https://www.xaviertavera.com/

Xavier Tavera Castro (born August 5, 1971) is a Mexican photographer and artist. He was born and raised in Mexico City where he studied at the Universidad Autonoma Metropolitana. Tavera completed his Bachelor of Fine Arts in Photography from Minneapolis College of Art and Design (MCAD) in 2014. Tavera received his Master of Fine Arts in Photography and Moving Images from the University of Minnesota in 2017. He taught photography at Augsburg College and the University of Minnesota-Twin Cities, and is currently an assistant professor of art at Carleton College. Tavera's work has been exhibited at the Minneapolis Institute of Art, the Soap Factory, the Eide/Dalrymple Gallery at Augustana University, the Staniar Gallery at Washington and Lee University, the Athens Institute for Contemporary Art in Georgia, the Center for the Study of Political Graphics in Los Angeles, the Galeria del Hospital Maciel in Montevideo, Uruguay, and at ProjekTraum FN at l'atelier Glidden Wozniak in Friedrichshafen, Germany. Tavera received a McKnight Fellowship for Photography in 2003 and his work has been recognized with grants from OverExposureMN and the Minnesota State Arts Board.

== Early life and education ==
=== Early years ===
Around age sixteen, Tavera started using the family camera to make portraits of family, friends and strangers he encountered on the street. During these formative years, Tavera also became interested in events which brought together large groups of people, such as religious events focused on the Passion (“La Pasión de Cristo'') or the creation of community altarpieces (ofrendas).

=== Education ===
Tavera enrolled in law school in 1993 at Universidad Autonoma Metropolitana in Mexico City. In 1996, Tavera was invited to work as an industrial photographer for a company in the United States. The company offered to cover the cost of Tavera's tuition at Minneapolis College of Art and Design (MCAD). When the company went bankrupt and failed to pay his tuition, Tavera dropped out of MCAD to seek employment. He later re-enrolled and received his Bachelor of Fine Arts degree in 2014.

== Artworks ==
Tavera's photographs are inspired by interactions with strangers on the street, neighbors, and family members. Tavera's portraits emphasize individuals who are often marginalized, and he frequently focuses on members of the Latinx community. Tavera's work is based in prolonged engagement with his subjects. in his theory of photographic experience in which the process begins when the artist conceives an idea, continues over the course of multiple conversations with the intended subject (sometimes involving long-distance travel, culminating in one or more photography sessions, complete with the image post production. Tavera contends that the final image printed on paper is a byproduct or record of the photographic experience.

=== Borderlands, 2017 ===
Tavera's final year of his Masters in Fine Arts at the University of Minnesota coincided with the political turmoil concerning immigration and the Trump administration which inspired a new series of work for Tavera. Prior to starting his last semester, Tavera traveled the whole length of the United States-Mexico border to document the landscape and its inhabitants. Drawing on his own memories of crossing the border and the knowledge that the border exists as a part of everyday life for Latinas/Latinos/Latinx living in the United States, Tavera photographed views from both sides of the border depicting the surrounding landscapes and portraits of people he encountered in the area. Tavera's intention with Borderlands was in finding the more personal, humane aspect of the region as this resonated deeper with him versus the constant politicization of the land. Drawing on his previous work, he also began photographing deported veterans living on the border—many of whom were Mexican-born and served under various branches of the United States military as undocumented citizens. This aspect of Tavera's work seeks to bring veterans that have been cast aside to light. Tavera exhibited selections from the Borderland series at ProjekTraum FN at l'atelier Glidden Wozniak in Friedrichshafen, Germany, Kunsthaus Caserne in Friedrichshafen, Germany, and the Staniar Gallery at Washington and Lee University.

=== Veteranas/Veteranos, 2017 ===
Even as a child, Tavera exhibited great curiosity in Mexico's 201st Fighter Squadron (Spanish: Fuerza Aérea Expedicionaria Mexicana (FAEM) Escuadron 201), also known as Águilas Aztecas or Aztec Eagles which was a part of the Mexican Expeditionary Air Force that aided war efforts during World War II. Due to a lack of information on Escuadrón 201 and his personal interest in the subject, Tavera began seeking out veterans with the intention of documenting their lives and stories through photography. It was at this time that a friend of his, a journalist by the name of Alberto Luck, mentioned a documentary on which he had been working about Escuadrón 201. Tavera was introduced to Captain Manuel Cervantes Ramos, a World War II veteran who Tavera photographed in his home in Mexico City. This interaction allowed Tavera to get in contact with over a dozen Mexican WWII veterans, that he interviewed and photographed.

With time, the project expanded to a more diverse group that included Chicano/a, Mexican, and Latino/a veterans who served in the United States military during various wars. Tavera gained access to members of VFW Post #5, started by a group of Latino/a veterans who settled in St. Paul, Minnesota. While photographing these veterans along with their military memorabilia, he gained immense respect for their service, particularly moved by their courage and their fear of being forgotten. Tavera placed emphasis on capturing their vulnerability and emotional expression. The portraits often depict the veterans in their uniforms, some displaying alterations to their clothes that represented an aspect of their identity, such as their heritage or their military affiliation. Tavera also recorded some of these meetings which he used to give context to the messages displayed in his photographs. This body of work played a major role in his goal of recording the valuable history of Mexican, Chicano/a, and Latino/a veterans.

From personal interviews to photographs from his work with veterans, Tavera collected a wide variety of information which he sought to preserve through the Minnesota Historical Society. Through the use of a grant from the Minnesota State Arts Board, Tavera organized all of his photographs, interviews, and general information into a large collection, ready for preservation. After receiving Tavera's collection, the Minnesota Historical Society took interest in his work and set up an exhibition titled “AMVETS Post #5: Photographs by Xavier Tavera.” The exhibition opened September 23, 2017 at the Minnesota History Center and ran for the duration of six months. In the summer of 2020 he was able to publish a book with Cottage Industry, titled Nowhere To Go But Home where compiled all the portraits of the project and two essays by Andrea Lepage and Mike Soto.

=== Mascaras ===
Mascaras is an ongoing photo series that consists of photographs dedicated to showing the intimate, often unseen, parts of a mask. Tavera photographs masks that are either owned by members from his community in Minneapolis or are kept in museum institutions as artifacts. Tavera's goal with this project is to document the evidence of the people and the cultures that these masks belong to. He takes photos of the backsides of the masks which would typically be placed on one's face, often during cultural celebrations. Tavera also documents the structures and serial numbers placed onto the masks by the institutions they are held in which shows evidence of a different type of transformation: personal and intimate object to museum artifact. Tavera exhibited selections from the Mascaras series at the Staniar Gallery at Washington and Lee University.

=== Mexicaliens and vaqueros ===
While much of Tavera's photography features documentary-style portraits of members within his community, he also works constructing and staging photographic images. One of these series is titled Mexicaliens in reference to the Biden administration's move to replace the word “alien” with “noncitizen” when referencing non-American citizens. The project aims to provide a humorous take on the label and build fantastical characters, or aliens, that have stories and superpowers of their own.

Another part of Tavera's experimental work is labeled Vaqueras/Vaqueros, and its focus is on reinventing and reimagining the constructed Hollywood concept of the white cowboy as the lonely hero and the brown mustachioed villain. These projects serve as an extra creative outlet for Tavera to construct a fictional world of his own through portrait photography.

=== El Maciel Solo Exhibition ===
One important exhibition focuses on the people of the Hospital Maciel in Montevideo, Uruguay. Tavera spent two weeks photographing over one hundred of the hospital staff. The photos were large scale portraits of the personnel who worked at the hospital. He personally installed the photos of the doctors, administrative workers, nurses, and cleaning staff in one of the atriums of the hospital where the exhibition reception was held. The hospital photo collection had previously held portraits of the hospital directors and doctors, and Tavera aimed to dismantle professional hierarchies within the hospital by showcasing portraits of everyone who personally worked in the hospital.
