= East Bound and Down =

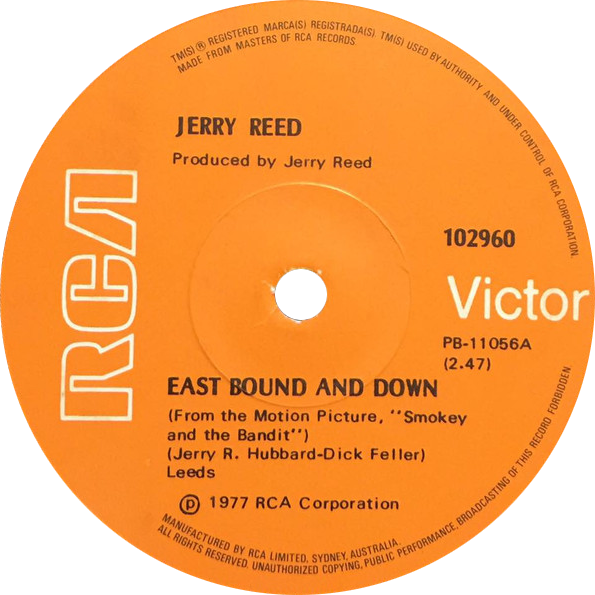
- Side A of the Australian single

Single by Jerry Reed

from the album Smokey And The Bandit: Music from the Motion Picture
- B-side: "(I'm Just a) Redneck in a Rock and Roll Bar"
- Released: August 1, 1977
- Genre: Truck-driving country
- Length: 2:45
- Label: RCA Victor
- Songwriters: Jerry Reed, Deena Kaye Rose
- Producer: Jerry Reed

Jerry Reed singles chronology
"With His Pants in His Hand" (1977)	"East Bound and Down" (1977)	"You Know What" (1977)

"East Bound and Down" is a song written by Jerry Reed and Deena Kaye Rose, (Note: Credited as Dick Feller; the song was written and released before Rose came out as transgender.) and recorded by Reed for the soundtrack for the film Smokey and the Bandit. The song features Reed on the lead vocal, and vocalist Gordon Stoker of the Jordanaires on the harmony vocal. It was released in August 1977 as a single on RCA Records, paired with "(I'm Just a) Redneck in a Rock and Roll Bar" as the B-side.

The song's lyrics tell the basic plot line of the movie (leaving out the runaway bride element) of making a 28-hour round-trip run from Atlanta, Georgia, to Texarkana, Texas, and back to illegally transport 400 cases of Coors beer for an after-race celebration. It spent 16 weeks on the U.S. country music charts, reaching a peak of No. 2. It also reached No. 3 on the Bubbling Under Hot 100.

The "...and Down" in the title and lyric is CB radio jargon for driving with the accelerator pedal all the way to the floor, which is known as having the "hammer down". "I got the hammer down" or "I'm down" means "I'm driving as fast as I can". "[Direction] bound and down" remains a common sign-off for truckers on CB radio.

== Chart performance ==
Chart (1977–1978)	Peak position
U.S. Billboard Hot Country Singles	2
U.S. Billboard Bubbling Under Hot 100	3
Canadian RPM Country Tracks	2

== Cover versions ==
- A variant version of the song, titled "West Bound and Down," was also recorded by Reed and included on the Smokey and the Bandit soundtrack. This variant is played during the westbound portion of the movie. The lyric "East bound and down—loaded up and truckin'" is changed to "West bound and down—eighteen wheels a-rollin'." The music and the rest of the lyrics remain the same; however, there is additional instrumentation which includes strings and horns.
- The Ford Motor Company revived the song's popularity as part of its F-Series truck advertisements in 2018, in which a host of pickups from different years and towing various items, such as barbecue grills, a 1960s-era Ford Bronco, and a statue of the Big Boy mascot, is seen driving down the highway.
- American Pop-Punk band Me First and the Gimme Gimmes included a cover on their fifth studio album Love Their Country.
