= Love Their Country =

Studio album by Me First and the Gimme Gimmes
- Released: October 17, 2006
- Recorded: April 3, 2006
- Genre: Punk rock
- Length: 25:28
- Label: Fat Wreck Chords
- Producer: Alex Newport

Me First and the Gimme Gimmes chronology
Ruin Jonny's Bar Mitzvah (2004)	Love Their Country (2006)	Have Another Ball (2008)

Professional ratings
Review scores
Source	Rating
Allmusic	4/5 stars
IGN	7.5/10 stars
The Post and Courier	B−
The Press-Enterprise	3/5 stars
PunkNews.org	3.5/5 stars
Stylus Magazine	A−

Love Their Country is the fifth studio album, and sixth overall by Me First and the Gimme Gimmes. It was released on October 17, 2006, by Fat Wreck Chords. The album consists of cover versions of country and western songs.

Prior to its release, a Fat Wreck Chords press release had stated that the album would range from "the Dixie Chicks to Garth [Brooks], Hank [Williams] Sr. to [Johnny] Cash." A cover of the "(Ghost) Riders in the Sky" was featured on iFloyd, a sampler released by Fat Wreck Chords.

Like their previous four albums, The Gimmes interpolate punk rock classics in their covers. Willie Nelson's "On the Road Again" uses the intro riff of "Astro Zombies" by The Misfits; "Sunday Morning Coming Down" adapts its arrangement from The Clash's rendition of "Police and Thieves"; "East Bound And Down" includes some of The Damned's "Love Song."

== Track listing ==
No.	Title	Writer(s)	Original performer	Length
1.	"Much Too Young (To Feel This Damn Old)"	Garth Brooks, Randy Taylor	Garth Brooks	2:02
2.	"(Ghost) Riders in the Sky"	Stan Jones	Stan Jones and his Death Valley Rangers	1:33
3.	"Desperado"	Glenn Frey, Don Henley	Eagles	2:28
4.	"On the Road Again" (contains an interpretation of "Astro Zombies" by the Misfits, written by Glenn Danzig)	Willie Nelson	Willie Nelson	2:13
5.	"Annie's Song"	John Denver	John Denver	1:42
6.	"Jolene"	Dolly Parton	Dolly Parton	1:47
7.	"I'm So Lonesome I Could Cry"	Hank Williams	Hank Williams	2:00
8.	"Lookin' for Love"	Wanda Malette, Robert Morrison, Patti Ryan	Johnny Lee	1:48
9.	"Goodbye Earl"	Dennis Linde	Dixie Chicks	2:25
10.	"East Bound and Down" (contains an interpretation of "Love Song" by The Damned)	Dick Feller, Jerry Reed	Jerry Reed	1:47
11.	"She Believes in Me"	Stephen Gibb	Kenny Rogers	2:11
12.	"Sunday Morning Coming Down" (contains an interpretation of "Police and Thieves" by The Clash, written by Junior Murvin and Lee "Scratch" Perry)	Kris Kristofferson	Johnny Cash	3:32

== Personnel ==
- Spike Slawson - vocals
- Chris Shiflett (a.k.a. Jake Jackson) - lead guitar
- Joey Cape - rhythm guitar
- Fat Mike - bass
- Dave Raun - drums

=== Additional musicians ===
- Brendan Allen - bagpipes on "I'm So Lonesome I Could Cry"

== See also ==
- Me First and the Gimme Gimmes discography
