= Are We Not Men? We Are Diva! =

Studio album by Me First and the Gimme Gimmes
- Released: May 13, 2014
- Recorded: 2013–14
- Studio: Studio 606 West (Northridge, Los Angeles, California)
- Genre: Punk rock
- Length: 34:11
- Label: Fat Wreck Chords

Me First and the Gimme Gimmes chronology
Sing in Japanese (2011)	Are We Not Men? We Are Diva! (2014)	Rake it In: The Greatestest Hits (2017)

Are We Not Men? We Are Diva! is a cover album from punk rock supergroup Me First and the Gimme Gimmes. The album consists of covers of songs originally performed by divas. It was released on May 13, 2014 on Fat Wreck Chords.

Prior to the album's release, the band put out two singles. The first was their cover of Paula Abdul's track "Straight Up". On May 5, they released a cover of Christina Aguilera's "Beautiful" as a second pre-release single.

Speaking about the album, guitarist Joey Cape said in an interview that "we always cover songs that one might consider to be guilty pleasures. 'Beautiful' clearly fits the bill. It is a great song but not necessarily something a fan of any of our bands would even consider." The title is a reference to Devo's album Q: Are We Not Men? A: We Are Devo!.

The album continues the band's tradition of marrying cover versions with elements of classic punk songs. For example, this album's version of "Speechless" borrows the intro to "Sonic Reducer" by Dead Boys, "On the radio" uses the intro to "Brickfield Nights" by The Boys, "Beautiful" uses the intro to "Superficial Love" by TSOL, "Straight Up" lifts the intro from "Evil" by 45 Grave, and "Karma Chameleon" uses the intro to "Everybody's Happy Nowadays" by Buzzcocks.

== Critical reception ==
Professional ratings
Review scores
Source	Rating
AllMusic	3.5/5 stars
Alternative Press	4/5 stars
The Intelligencer	3.5/5 stars
South Wales Evening Post	(favorable)
Weekender	5/5 stars

At Alternative Press, Brendan Manley rated the album four out of five stars, remarking how the band "achieves bona fide diva-dom, estrogen aside."

== Track listing ==
No.	Title	Writer(s)	Original performer	Length
1.	"I Will Survive"	Freddie Perren, Dino Fekaris	Gloria Gaynor	2:27
2.	"Straight Up" (uses the intro from "Evil" by 45 Grave, composed by Dinah Cancer, Paul Cutler and Don Bolles)	Elliot Wolff	Paula Abdul	2:59
3.	"Believe"	Brian Higgins, Stuart McLennen, Paul Barry, Steven Torch, Matthew Gray, Timothy Powell	Cher	3:08
4.	"Beautiful" (uses the intro from "Superficial Love" by T.S.O.L.)	Linda Perry	Christina Aguilera	2:12
5.	"My Heart Will Go On"	James Horner, Will Jennings	Celine Dion	2:44
6.	"I Will Always Love You (from Dolly)"	Dolly Parton	Dolly Parton	2:12
7.	"Top of the World"	Richard Carpenter, John Bettis	The Carpenters	2:09
8.	"Speechless" (uses the intro from "Sonic Reducer" by The Dead Boys)	Stefani Germanotta	Lady Gaga	3:19
9.	"Karma Chameleon" (uses the intro from "Everybody's Happy Nowadays" by The Buzzcocks, written by Pete Shelley)	George O'Dowd, Jon Moss, Mikey Craig, Roy Hay, Phil Pickett, Alfie Malone	Culture Club	3:45
10.	"Crazy for You" (uses a ukulele interpretation of the intro from "The Tide Is High" by Blondie, written by John Holt)	John Bettis, Jon Lind	Madonna	2:48
11.	"On the Radio" (uses the intro from "Brickfield Nights" by The Boys, written by Stein "Casino Steel" Groven and Matt Dangerfield)	Donna Summer, Giorgio Moroder	Donna Summer	3:36
12.	"The Way We Were"	Alan Bergman, Marilyn Bergman, Marvin Hamlisch	Barbra Streisand	2:53

== Personnel ==
- Spike Slawson – vocals
- Chris Shiflett (a.k.a. Jake Jackson) – lead guitar
- Joey Cape – rhythm guitar
- Fat Mike – bass
- Dave Raun – drums

== Additional musicians ==
- Samon Rajabnik – keyboards
- Jamin Barton – sax
- Joe Raposo – upright bass
- Darius Koski – accordion
- Eric Melvin – backing vocals
- Paddy Skinner – backing vocals
