= Sing in Japanese =

Sing In Japanese

EP by Me First and the Gimme Gimmes
- Released: September 13, 2011
- Recorded: 2011
- Genre: Punk rock
- Length: 16:05
- Label: Fat Wreck Chords

Me First and the Gimme Gimmes chronology
| Go Down Under (2011) | Sing In Japanese (2011) | Are We Not Men? We Are Diva! (2014) |

Professional ratings
Review scores
| Source | Rating |
|---|---|
| Daily News | (unfavorable) |
| Punknews.org | 4.0/5 stars |

Sing In Japanese is a cover EP from punk rock supergroup Me First and the Gimme Gimmes. The album consists of covers from Japanese artists and groups. It was released on September 13, 2011 in conjunction with the band's Japanese tour. It was recorded at the Foo Fighters’ 606 Studio, and this is the second EP in the band's series of "world EPs".

== Track listing ==
| No. | Title | Writer(s) | Original performer | Length |
|---|---|---|---|---|
| 1. | "Hero" | Yoshihiro Kai | Kai Band | 2:33 |
| 2. | "Kokoro No Tabi" | Kazuo Zaitsu | Tulip | 2:12 |
| 3. | "Kekkon Shiyoyo" (Contains an interpolation of "Story of My Life" by Social Distortion) | Takuro Yoshida | Takuro Yoshida | 2:43 |
| 4. | "C-C-C" (Contains an interpolation of "Bloodstains" by Agent Orange, written by Mike Palm) | Kunihiko Kase, Kazumi Yasui | The Tigers | 2:08 |
| 5. | "22 Sai No Wakare" | Shōzō Ise | Kaguyahime | 2:17 |
| 6. | "Linda Linda" | Hiroto Kōmoto | The Blue Hearts | 4:02 |

== Personnel ==
- Spike Slawson - vocals
- Chris Shiflett (a.k.a. Jake Jackson) - lead guitar
- Joey Cape - rhythm guitar
- Fat Mike - bass
- Dave Raun - drums

=== Additional musicians ===
- Brad Magers and Keith Douglas - trumpets on "Linda Linda"
- Toshiya Ohno, Yoshiki Suzuki, Kosuke Yamagishi and Yumiko Hoshi - gang vocals
