= Blow in the Wind =

Studio album by Me First and the Gimme Gimmes
- Released: March 20, 2001
- Genre: Punk rock
- Length: 26:02
- Label: Fat Wreck Chords

Me First and the Gimme Gimmes chronology
Turn Japanese (2001)	Blow in the Wind (2001)	Take a Break (2003)

Professional ratings
Review scores
Source	Rating
The Age	4/5 stars
AllMusic	4.5/5 stars
Boston Herald	2/4 stars
Calgary Herald	3/4 stars
Robert Christgau	(dud)
Entertainment Weekly	B+
Fort Worth Star-Telegram	3.5/5 stars
Ottawa Sun	3.5/5 stars
Reno Gazette-Journal	2.5/5 stars
The Stanford Daily	(mixed)
Winnipeg Sun	3.5/5 stars

Blow in the Wind is the third album by Me First and the Gimme Gimmes, released in 2001, on the Fat Wreck Chords independent record label. Blow in the Wind features several tracks which are led off with musical mash-ups of, or homages to, classic punk songs, a trend the group began on their second album, Are a Drag (with an interpolation of "Generator" by Bad Religion for their cover of "My Favorite Things") and would continue with Take a Break and Ruin Jonny's Bar Mitzvah: "Sloop John B" samples "Teenage Lobotomy" by The Ramones, "Elenor" samples "London Calling" by The Clash, "San Francisco" samples "Stranger Than Fiction" by Bad Religion, "I Only Want to Be With You" samples and "The Money Will Roll Right In" by Fang. Similarly, the track "Different Drum" also ends with a guitar riff taken from "Georgy Girl" by the Seekers.

The first song begins with a clip similar to the hidden track on the NOFX album Punk in Drublic where Fat Mike attempts to find the proper pitch of the word "how" in the line "How did the cat get so fat?" from "Perfect Government".

The album is made up entirely of "Hits of the 1960s". The band's version of "Different Drum" can be heard during the credits of the film Dodgeball: A True Underdog Story.

The band's version of "Sloop John B" is featured in the 2013 film The Wolf of Wall Street.

== Track listing ==
No.	Title	Writer(s)	Original performer	Length
1.	"Blowin' in the Wind" (begins with an allusion to the end of "Perfect Government" by NOFX)	Bob Dylan	Bob Dylan
2.	"Sloop John B" (contains an interpolation of "Teenage Lobotomy" by the Ramones, written by Dee Dee Ramone)	Traditional, arranged by Brian Wilson	The Beach Boys
3.	"Wild World"	Cat Stevens	Cat Stevens
4.	"Who Put the Bomp (in the Bomp, Bomp, Bomp)"	Barry Mann, Gerry Goffin	Barry Mann and The Halos
5.	"Elenore" (contains an interpolation of "London Calling" by The Clash, written by Joe Strummer and Mick Jones)	Howard Kaylan, Mark Volman, Al Nichol, Jim Pons, John Barbata	The Turtles
6.	"My Boyfriend's Back"	Bob Feldman, Jerry Goldstein, Richard Gottehrer	The Angels
7.	"All My Loving" (contains an interpolation of "You Drive Me Ape (You Big Gorilla)" by The Dickies, written by Stan Lee, Leonard Graves Phillips, and Steve Hufsteter.)	John Lennon, Paul McCartney	The Beatles
8.	"Stand by Your Man"	Billy Sherrill, Tammy Wynette	Tammy Wynette
9.	"San Francisco (Be Sure to Wear Flowers in Your Hair)" (contains an interpolation of "Stranger Than Fiction" by Bad Religion, written by Brett Gurewitz and "Pessimistic Lines" by Bad Religion, written by Greg Graffin)	John Phillips	Scott McKenzie
10.	"I Only Want to Be with You" (contains an interpolation of "The Money Will Roll Right In" by Fang)	Mike Hawker, Ivor Raymonde	Dusty Springfield
11.	"Runaway" (ends with a similar ending lyric from "EMI" by The Sex Pistols)	Del Shannon, Max Crook	Del Shannon
12.	"Will You Still Love Me Tomorrow?" (ends with a similar ending lyric from "Making Friends" by Lagwagon)	Gerry Goffin, Carole King	The Shirelles
13.	"Different Drum" (ends with a guitar riff taken from "Georgy Girl" by The Seekers)	Michael Nesmith	The Greenbriar Boys

== Personnel ==
- Spike Slawson – vocals
- Chris Shiflett (a.k.a. Jake Jackson) – lead guitar
- Joey Cape – rhythm guitar
- Fat Mike – bass
- Dave Raun – drums
