= Shiflett Brothers =

American sculptors

The Shiflett Brothers are Texas-based sculptors working in the comic book and gaming industries.

== Life and career ==
Brandon (born December 19, 1968)and Jarrod (born August 7, 1972) Shiflett began their sculpting careers working on the character maquettes for the video game "Oddworld: Abe's Oddysee". The pair are most well known for their work on Marvel character statues including The Incredible Hulk, Thanos, Wolverine, Black Panther, and The Juggernaut all produced by Bowen Designs.

Other notable work includes The Earth X Captain America statue co-sculpted with creator Alex Ross. Matt Wagner's "Grendel Prime" and David Mack's "Kabuki" porcelain statues were also sculpted by the brothers.

The brothers have been included in two Spectrum Art books, collecting that specific year's best fantasy art. They won the Spectrum Silver Dimensional Award for their work on the "Draco" from Dragonheart porcelain statue from Moore Creations. The pair has garnered praise from painter Alex Ross as well as Special Effects guru and multiple Academy Award winner, Sir Richard Taylor of Weta Workshop.

== Notable works ==
=== Originals ===
- Chloe: Aviator For Hire
- Ol' Scratch
- Principia & the Serpent

=== Commercial Pieces ===
- The Incredible Hulk
- Thanos
- Wolverine
- Black Panther
- The Juggernaut
- Earth X Captain America (co-sculpted with creator Alex Ross)
- Grendel Prime
- Kabuki
- Cremator
- Draco
- Frank Frazetta's Jaguar God
- Oddworld: Abe's Oddysee
