= Turn Japanese =

EP by Me First and the Gimme Gimmes
- Released: February 21, 2001
- Recorded: Motor Studios, San Francisco
- Genre: Punk rock
- Length: 13:02
- Label: Pizza of Death

Me First and the Gimme Gimmes chronology
Are a Drag (1999)	Turn Japanese (2001)	Blow in the Wind (2001)

Turn Japanese is an EP released by Me First and the Gimme Gimmes on February 21, 2001 by Japanese label Pizza of Death Records. The EP is made up of covers of songs from the 1960s and 1970s.

The majority of the songs were previously released, with "The Boxer", "You've Got a Friend" and "Don't Let the Sun Go Down on Me" each originally appearing on 7" singles (Garf, In Your Barkalounger and Elton respectively) in 1999. All three later appeared on Have Another Ball. "Blowin' in the Wind" and "The Times Are A-Changing" were both unreleased at the time, with the former appearing a month later on the album Blow in the Wind and both appearing on the Bob 7" later in the year. "The Times Are A-Changing" also later appeared on the compilation album Happy Meals Volume 3.

== Track listing ==
No.	Title	Writer(s)	Original artist	Length
1.	"The Times They Are A-Changin'"	Bob Dylan	Bob Dylan	2:09
2.	"The Boxer"	Paul Simon	Simon & Garfunkel	2:49
3.	"You've Got a Friend"	Carole King	Carole King / James Taylor	2:35
4.	"Blowin' in the Wind"	Bob Dylan	Bob Dylan	1:44
5.	"Don't Let the Sun Go Down on Me"	Elton John, Bernie Taupin	Elton John	3:49
