= Chris Shiflett =

American guitarist (born 1971)

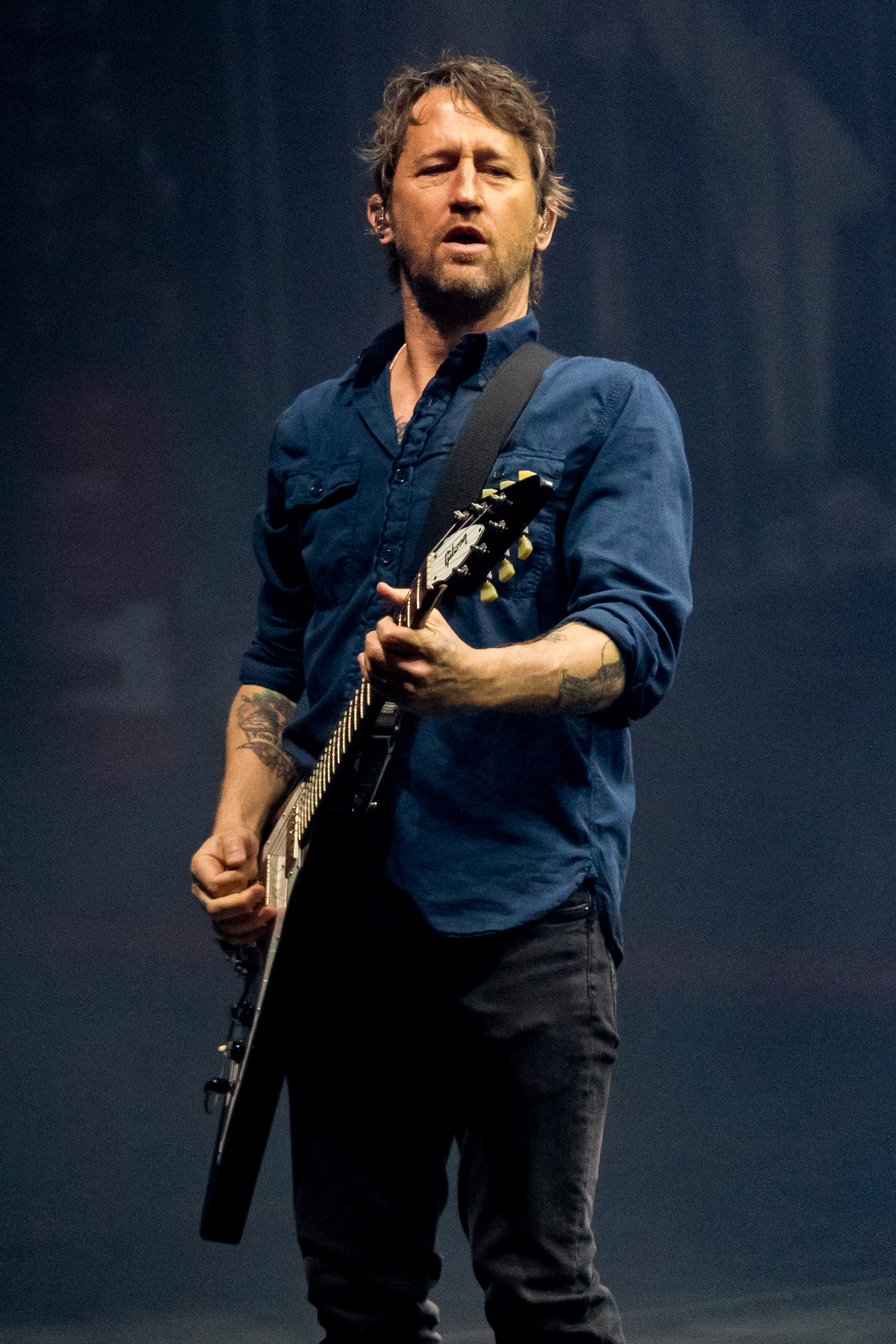
- Shiflett with Foo Fighters in 2023

Background information
- Also known as: Jake Jackson
- Born: Christopher Aubrey Shiflett; May 6, 1971 (age 55); Santa Barbara, California, U.S.
- Genres: Alternative rock; punk rock; skate punk; post-grunge; country rock; hard rock
- Occupation: Musician
- Instruments: Guitar, vocals, mandolin
- Years active: 1985–present
- Label: RCA
- Member of: Foo Fighters, Viva Death
- Formerly of: Me First and the Gimme Gimmes, No Use for a Name, Jackson United, Sound City Players, 22 Jacks, The Real McCoy, The Dead Peasants, Rat Pack
- Website: chrisshiflettmusic.com

Christopher Aubrey Shiflett (/ˈʃɪflɪt/ SHIF-lit; born May 6, 1971) is an American musician. He is the lead guitarist for the rock band Foo Fighters, which he joined in 1999 following the release of the band's third album There Is Nothing Left to Lose (1999). Shiflett was also previously a member of the punk rock bands No Use for a Name (1995–1999) and Me First and the Gimme Gimmes (1995–2019).

Though primarily a lead guitarist and backing vocalist, Shiflett has also fronted bands such as Jackson United and Chris Shiflett & the Dead Peasants. He has also made several solo albums; his third, Lost at Sea, was released in October 2023. In 2021, he was inducted into the Rock and Roll Hall of Fame as a member of the Foo Fighters.

== Early life ==
Shiflett was born in Santa Barbara, California. He has two older brothers, Mike, and Scott, who also became a musician – best known as the bassist of the punk rock band Face to Face. When Shiflett was 11, he started learning how to play the guitar. Shiflett played with the American Youth Soccer Organization (AYSO) from 1982–1984 under legendary coach Noemi Vazquez. Shiflett then traded soccer for guitar. Shiflett joined his first band by the time he reached the age of 14. Shiflett is a supporter of Arsenal F.C., having discovered the club while reading John Lydon's autobiography in the early 1990s.

== Career ==
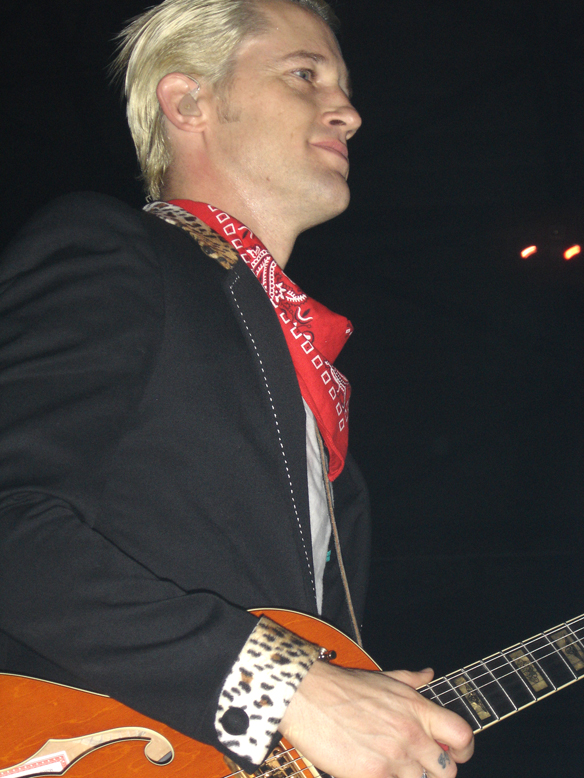
Shiflett in 2007

Shiflett began his music career in a band called Lost Kittenz with current members of Sugarcult. He later moved on to be the resident lead guitarist for the San Francisco Bay Area punk rock band No Use for a Name. In 1999, when a friend told him that Guns N' Roses were auditioning for a guitarist, Shiflett asked the friend to get him an audition instead with the Foo Fighters, who after recording There Is Nothing Left to Lose as a trio held open auditions to hire another guitarist. Offered the job, and seeing an opportunity that he knew he could not pass up, he quickly parted ways with No Use for a Name to join Foo Fighters. His departure was abrupt, as his former band was about to head out on tour in support of their album More Betterness!.

Dave Grohl said part of his motivation to hire Shiflett was that he had a history in the underground punk scene, including opening for Grohl's former band Scream as bassist of the group Rat Pack. After being hired, Shiflett played on the tour for There Is Nothing Left to Lose, and all subsequent studio albums starting with One by One. Shiflett has noted several times that one of his favorite songs that he plays with Foo Fighters is "All My Life" from their fourth studio album One by One. He has said that he was afraid of being fired even before he started to play with the band, as previous guitarist Pat Smear had asked to return. Smear eventually did rejoin the band as a touring rhythm guitarist in 2005, and finally as a full-fledged fifth member in 2010.

=== Side projects and cover bands ===
In addition to his full-time duties with Foo Fighters, Shiflett also plays in his own side-project, Jackson United, as well as Viva Death with his brother, Scott. For numerous projects, Shiflett performed under the name Jake Jackson. He played with the cover band Chevy Metal along with the late Foo Fighter Taylor Hawkins. They played songs from classic rock bands such as Black Sabbath, Queen, ZZ Top, and the Rolling Stones.

In 2009, Shiflett played in a band called The Real McCoy, which was founded by Andy McCoy, the guitarist of the former Finnish rock band Hanoi Rocks. The band split up after only three gigs.

In 2010 Shiflett created a new country-oriented side project, Chris Shiflett & the Dead Peasants, releasing a self-titled album in July. In 2011, Shiflett performed at the 2011 Wisconsin protests in Madison. He also performed at the Anti War rally for the A.N.S.W.E.R coalition (Act Now to Stop War and End Racism). Shiflett performed at the opening rally at the one and a half mile march from Hollywood and Vine to Hollywood and Highland March 19, 2011.

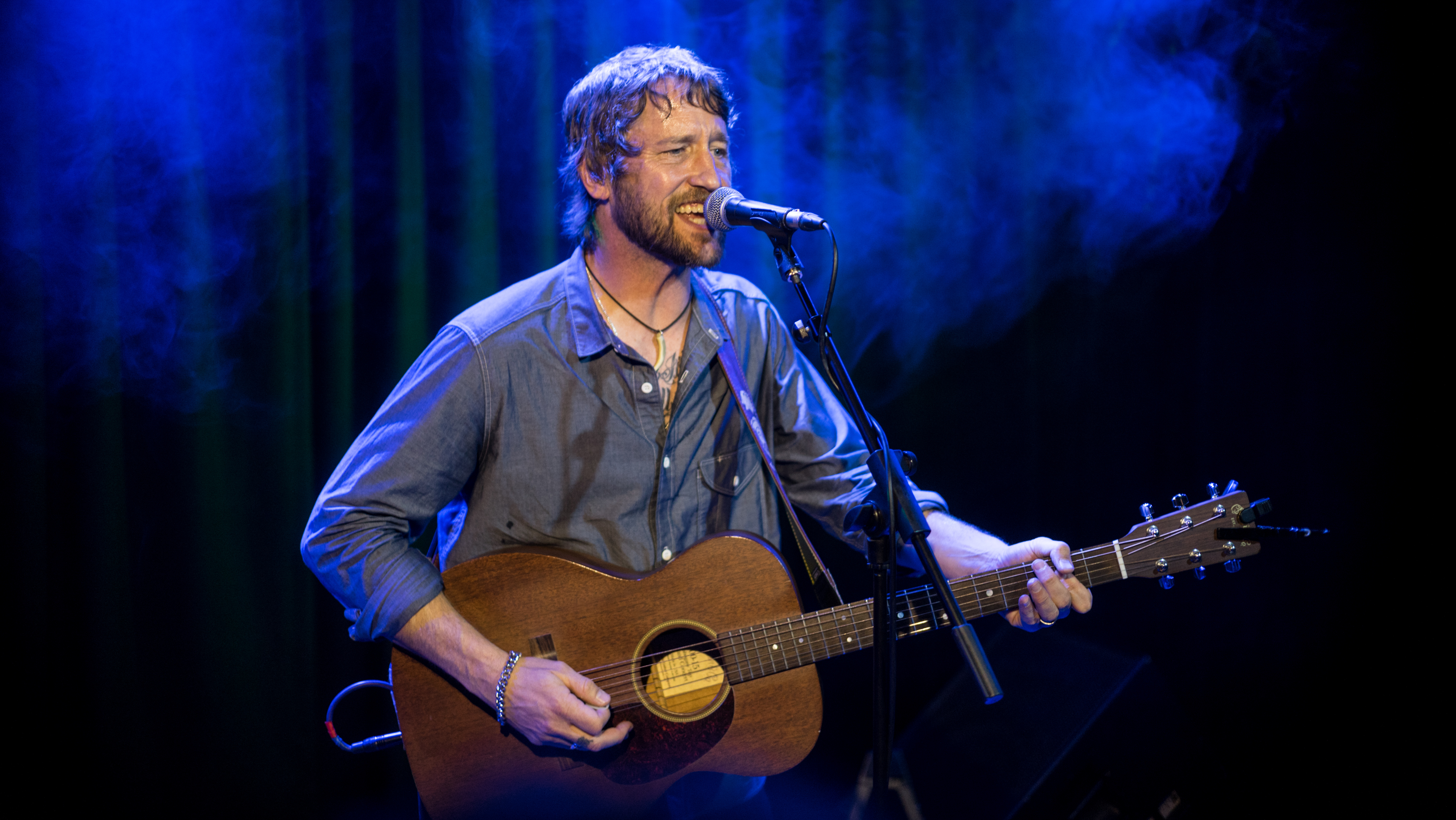
Shiftlett at a 2017 solo concert

In 2013, Shiflett announced he would be releasing a new album with The Dead Peasants, called All Hat and No Cattle. The album of honky-tonk covers and original tracks came out on July 30, 2013, via SideOneDummy Records.

April 2017 saw Shiflett release West Coast Town, the first album to bear solely his name, which was a collection of original honky tonk tracks. A short North American tour accompanied the release. A second solo album Hard Lessons was released on June 14, 2019. As with the first album Hard Lessons was produced by Dave Cobb. His third solo album, Lost At Sea, was released on October 20, 2023. The album's announcement came with a run of solo dates through the UK and Ireland, which were completed in March 2023.

From October 2013 to December 2022, Shiflett hosted the weekly podcast Walking the Floor with Chris Shiflett. 215 episodes of the show were produced in total. In June 2023, Shiflett announced a new guitar-based podcast entitled Shred with Shifty.

== Equipment ==
Guitars

Shiflett uses various Gibsons and Gretschs, but over the past few years has been using mostly Fender Telecasters, Fender Telecaster Deluxes, and Fender Telecaster Thinlines. Shiflett also assembled some Telecaster Deluxes and Telecaster Thinlines out of Warmoth guitar parts with his tech. On the headstock of the Warmoth Telecasters, Shiflett's nickname "Shifty" replaces the Fender logo that would appear on a Telecaster created by Fender. He also has a signature Fender Telecaster Deluxe based on the Warmoth Telecasters, that is now his main guitar.

- Gretsch Brian Setzer Black Phoenix
- Gretsch '59 Nashville reissue
- Gretsch G6129TAU Sparkle Jet
- Gretsch G6136TBK Black Falcon
- Gretsch 1957 Silver Jet
- Gretsch G6120T Players Edition Nashville
- Gibson ES-135 Black Custom
- Gibson ES-140
- Gibson ES-175 Electric
- Gibson ES-347
- Gibson ES-335
- Gibson SG Custom
- Gibson Les Paul Traditional (Heritage Cherry Sunburst)
- Gibson Les Paul Custom
- Gibson Les Paul Goldtop
- Gibson Les Paul Junior
- Gibson Les Paul Standard
- Gibson Firebird Vintage
- Gibson Firebird Non-Reversed
- Gibson Flying V
- Gibson Explorer
- Fender Chris Shiflett Telecaster Deluxe
- Fender Telecaster
- Fender Blacktop Telecaster
- Fender Telecaster Deluxe
- Fender Stratocaster Custom Shop
- Fender Esquire
- Duesenberg Fullerton TV
- B.C. Rich Mockingbird
- Martin Acoustic guitar
- Vox Phantom Special VI
- Vox SSC-55
- Duesenberg Starplayer TV Electric Guitar
- Warmoth Stratocaster
- Warmoth Thinline Telecaster
- Normandy Chrome Archtop w/ Bigsby Tailpiece
- Burns Double Six

Effects

- Strymon Timeline
- EHX Micro POG
- BOSS TU-3 Chromatic Tuner / Power Supply
- Dunlop DVP1 Volume pedal
- Whirlwind A/B Selector
- Line 6 M13 Stompbox Modeler (Wasting Light Tour)
- Boss DS-1 Distortion
- ProCo Rat Pedal
- Line 6 DL4 Delay Modeler
- Voodoo Labs Amp Selector
- Line 6 MM4 Modulation Modeler
- Menatone Red Snapper
- Electro-Harmonix Holy Grail Pedal
- Fulltone Fulldrive 2 MOSFET
- Vox Input Selector/Jumper Switch
- Heptode Virtuoso Phase Shifter
- JHS Muffuletta Fuzz

Amplifiers

- Handwired Vox AC30
- Fender Bassman
- Fender Super Reverb
- Friedman BE-100
- Mesa/Boogie Road King
- Neural DSP Quad Cortex (solo tours)

== Discography ==
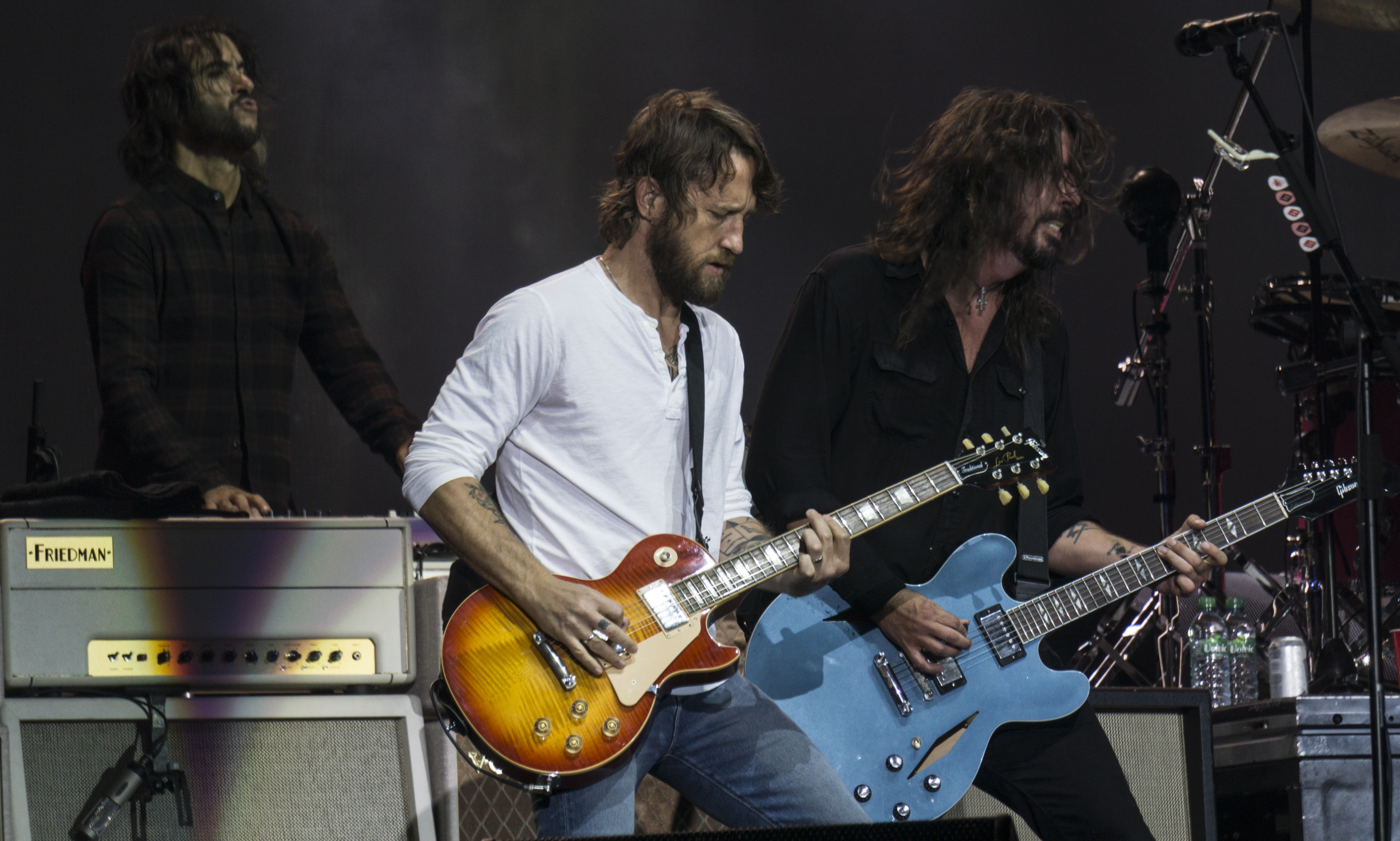
Shiflett with Foo Fighters at Lollapalooza 2017

=== Solo ===
- 2010: Chris Shiflett & the Dead Peasants (with The Dead Peasants)
- 2013: All Hat and No Cattle (with The Dead Peasants)
- 2017: West Coast Town
- 2019: Hard Lessons
- 2023: Lost at Sea

=== No Use for a Name ===
- 1997: Making Friends
- 1999: More Betterness!

=== Me First and the Gimme Gimmes ===
- 1997: Have a Ball
- 1999: Are a Drag
- 2001: Blow in the Wind
- 2001: Turn Japanese
- 2003: Take a Break
- 2004: Ruin Jonny's Bar Mitzvah
- 2006: Love Their Country
- 2008: Have Another Ball
- 2011: Go Down Under
- 2011: Sing in Japanese
- 2014: Are We Not Men? We Are Diva!

=== Foo Fighters ===
- 2002: One by One
- 2005: In Your Honor
- 2007: Echoes, Silence, Patience & Grace
- 2011: Wasting Light
- 2014: Sonic Highways
- 2015: Saint Cecilia (EP)
- 2017: Concrete and Gold
- 2021: Medicine at Midnight
- 2023: But Here We Are
- 2026: Your Favorite Toy

=== Jackson United ===
- 2004: Western Ballads
- 2008: Harmony and Dissidence

=== Guest appearances ===
- 1994: Lagwagon — Trashed (Guitar Solo on “Bye for Now”)
- 1997: Ten Foot Pole – Unleashed (additional guitar on "Denial", "What You Want" and "Pride and Shame")
- 1998: Swingin' Utters – Five Lessons Learned (lead guitar on "I Need Feedback" and "Untitled 21")
- 2001: Sugarcult - "Bouncing off the Walls" (guitar solo)
- 2006: Viva Death – One Percent Panic
- 2007: Jesse Malin – Glitter In The Gutter (additional guitar on "Prisoners Of Paradise")
- 2023: Appeared as a secret act on the Pyramid stage at Glastonbury festival in the UK

== Walking the Floor ==
Walking the Floor episodes
1. Red Simpson
2. John Doe
3. Nick Arson
4. Robert Garcia
5. Joe Saunders
6. Dwight Yoakam
7. Dwight Yoakam
8. Tommy Hays
9. Peter Case
10. Peter Case
11. Jonny Wickersham
12. Steve Earle
13. Thomas Frank
14. Matt Skiba
15. Redd Volkaert
16. Kenny Vaughn
17. Sami Yaffa
18. Sam Jones
19. Kevin Smith
20. Keith Gattis
21. Conner Coffin
22. Robbie Fulks
23. Brad Paisley
24. Brad Paisley
25. Bloodshot Records
26. Jack McCoy
27. Brian Whelan
28. Sturgill Simpson
29. Mike Ness
30. Merle Haggard
31. Patterson Hood
32. Jim Lauderdale
33. Dale Watson
34. Dicky Barrett
35. Rhett Miller
36. Steven Shane McDonald
37. Jack Grisham
38. Steve Caballero
39. Spike Slawson
40. Merle Haggard tribute
41. Eli Reed
42. Andrew Stockdale
43. Dierks Bentley
44. Sam Palladio
45. Kip Moore
46. John Doe
47. Sara Watkins
48. Jason Isbell
49. Ryan Bingham
50. Sarah Jarosz
51. Old Dominion
52. Wheeler Walker Jr.
53. Jack Ingram
54. Cody Jinks
55. Dave Cobb
56. Whitey Morgan
57. Michaela Anne
58. Buddy Miller
59. Amanda Shires
60. Freddie Roach
61. Thomas Frank
62. John Moreland
63. Robert Ellis
64. Lydia Loveless
65. BJ Barham
66. Taylor Goldsmith
67. Mickey Raphael
68. Slim Jim Phantom
69. Tim Easton
70. Courtney Marie Andrews
71. Aaron Lee Tasjan
72. Andrew Leahey
73. Lucinda Williams
74. Tucker Beathard
75. Davey Havok and Jade Puget
76. Marty Stuart
77. Bob Mould
78. Rodney Crowell
79. Paul Cauthen
80. Imelda May
81. Sam Outlaw
82. Jaime Wyatt
83. Joe Sib
84. Jade Jackson
85. Sunny Sweeney
86. Jim Breuer
87. Dave Hause
88. Robbie Robertson
89. Justin Townes Earle
90. Rod Melancon
91. Butch Walker
92. Sheryl Crow
93. Lukas Nelson
94. Paul Kelly
95. Steve Earle
96. Tyler Childers
97. Chris Stapleton
98. Lindi Ortega
99. Anderson East
100. Ray Benson
101. Pokey LaFarge
102. Lillie Mae
103. Elizabeth Cook
104. Lee Ann Womack
105. Colter Wall
106. Alex Williams
107. Kendell Marvel
108. Cindy Wilson
109. Bob Arum
110. Brothers Osborne
111. Dan Tyminski
112. Dave Alvin
113. Drew Holcomb
114. Tony Joe White
115. Charley Crockett
116. Tyler Mahan Coe
117. Joshua Hedley
118. Paul Franklin
119. Michael Monroe
120. Rhett Miller
121. Vince Gill
122. Taylor Goldsmith
123. Ashley Monroe
124. Brent Cobb
125. Justin Moore
126. Amanda Shires
127. Sam Morrow
128. Dawn Landes
129. Carolina Story
130. Ace Frehley
131. Mike and the Moonpies
132. Manny Pacquiao
133. Rayland Baxter
134. Shooter Jennings
135. Garret T. Capps
136. BJ Barham
137. Shakey Graves
138. Blackberry Smoke
139. Parker Millsap
140. Will Hoge
141. Hayes Carll
142. Joe Firstman
143. Quaker City Night Hawks
144. John Paul White
145. The Lumineers
146. Seven Peaks Special Report
147. Todd Snider
148. Yola
149. Kendell Marvel
150. Randy Houser
151. Tony Brown
152. Jamie Brisick
153. Foy Vance
154. Jack Ingram
155. Robert Earl Keen
156. Marcus King
157. Delbert McClinton
158. Luke Dick
159. Pokey LaFarge
160. Jonathan Wilson
161. Sadler Vaden
162. Midland
163. Steve Gorman
164. Jon Pardi
165. Pat Green
166. Brandy Clark
167. Ketch Secor
168. Lori McKenna
169. Lucinda Williams
170. Thomas Frank
171. Shelby Lynne
172. Matt Stoller
173. Molly Tuttle
174. S.G. Goodman
175. Jaren Johnston
176. Billy Strings
177. Jay Joyce
178. Brian Fallon
179. The Wild Feathers
180. Brian Setzer
181. Tommy Lee
182. Waylon Payne
183. The Jayhawks
184. Duane Betts
185. Tommy Emmanuel
186. Satsang
187. Devon Gilfillian
188. Suggs
189. Ward Davis
190. Del McCoury
191. Greta Van Fleet
192. Imelda May
193. Jay Bentley
194. Corb Lund
195. Morgan Wade
196. Teddy Atlas
197. Dom Flemons
198. Jackson Browne
199. Hardy
200. Charlie Worsham
201. Tom Beajour and Rich Bienstock
202. Lake Street Dive
203. Samantha Crain
204. Lucas Kunce
205. Lee Rocker
206. David Sirota
207. George Kambosos Jr.
208. Leah Blevins
209. Gennady Golovkin
210. Mike Campbell
211. Wolfgang Van Halen
212. Hailey Whitters
213. Ashley McBryde and John Osborne
214. Randy Rogers
215. Aaron Ratiere
