= Chris Shiflett & the Dead Peasants =

Studio album by Chris Shiflett & the Dead Peasants
- Released: July 9, 2010
- Recorded: December 2009 – January 2010
- Studio: Studio 606 in Los Angeles
- Genre: Alt-country; rock
- Length: 34:52
- Label: RCA
- Producer: Chris Shiflett & the Dead Peasants

Professional ratings
Review scores
| Source | Rating |
|---|---|
| AllMusic | 3.5/5 stars |
| Rock Sound | 7/10 |

Chris Shiflett & the Dead Peasants is the self-titled debut album from Chris Shiflett, lead guitarist of Foo Fighters. The Dead Peasants are his second side project, following Jackson United, and the backing band is composed of different musicians than that of Jackson United.

The album is a departure from his rock/punk background, and is influenced by country, rockabilly, and Americana.

All songs feature Shiflett as lead vocalist and guitarist. All songs are also written by him, with the exception of "Burning Lights", a cover of a song performed by Joe Strummer in a cameo in the 1990 film, I Hired a Contract Killer.

== Track listing ==
All songs written by Chris Shiflett, except "Burning Lights" by John Mellor.

1. "Helsinki" - 3:50
2. "Get Along" - 4:24
3. "Bandaged" - 4:16
4. "God Damn" - 4:21
5. "Burning Lights" - 3:25
6. "An Atheists Prayer" - 5:02
7. "Not Going Down Alone" - 1:58
8. "Baby, Let It Out" - 4:34
9. "Death March" - 2:41

== Personnel ==
Personnel adapted from Chris Shiflett & the Dead Peasants CD booklet.

Musicians

- Chris Shiflett – guitar & vocals (all tracks); mandolin (track 4), bass (tracks 7, 9)
- John Lousteau – drums (all tracks)
- Derek Silverman – keyboards (all tracks)
- Greg Leisz – pedal steel (tracks 1–5, 9)
- Paul Bushnell – bass (tracks 1, 3, 8)
- Davey Faragher – bass (tracks 2, 4–6)
- Eddie Perez – guitar (tracks 2, 3, 5, 6)
- Audra Mae – vocals (track 3)
- Stevie Blacke – mandolin (track 3), violin (track 9)
- Dan Lavery – vocals (tracks 4–6)
- Heather Waters – vocals (track 6)

Production

- Chris Shiflett & the Dead Peasants – production
- John Lousteau – engineering
- Michael Dumas – mixing
- Eddy Schreyer – mastering
- Jack Butler – cover & live photos
- Jeff Nicholas – Arlington Theatre photo
