= Última muñeca =

Quinceañera tradition

La última muñeca (Spanish for "the last doll") is a tradition of the Quinceañera, the celebration of a girl's fifteenth birthday in parts of Latin America. During this ritual, the quinceañera relinquishes a doll from her childhood to signify that she is no longer in need of such a toy, often giving it to a younger female relative. The ritual could also suggest that she is now capable of being a mother. The chambalán de honor is a person designated to "present her to society" and is usually the one to give her the última muñeca as well. The birthday girl will then dance with the doll as part of the ceremony. Some of the dolls used in the ceremony are made in a very elegant manner, using ceramic or porcelain and are hand painted. These collector’s dolls are highly sought on the collector’s market.
