= Take a Break (album) =

Studio album by Me First and the Gimme Gimmes
- Released: July 1, 2003
- Recorded: Motor Studios, San Francisco
- Genre: Punk rock
- Length: 32:30
- Label: Fat Wreck Chords

Me First and the Gimme Gimmes chronology
| Blow in the Wind (2001) | Take a Break (2003) | Ruin Jonny's Bar Mitzvah (2004) |

Take a Break is the fourth album by Me First and the Gimme Gimmes, released on July 1, 2003, on Fat Wreck Chords independent record label.

The album consists entirely of cover versions of R&B songs. Like its predecessor, Blow in the Wind, several tracks lead off with appropriations of classic punk (or related genres like new wave) riffs ("Crazy" incorporates "Six Pack" by Black Flag, "Save the Best for Last" includes "Pretty Vacant" by the Sex Pistols, and "I'll Be There" borrows the intro from the Cars' "Just What I Needed").

== Production ==
The band had trouble selecting songs for inclusion, at first attempting upbeat songs such as "Papa Was a Rolling Stone", but found that they did not translate well to sped-up punk rhythms. They eventually settled on ballads with "no real time signature" that were more amenable to rearrangement. When the band first finished recording and submitted the album to be pressed and distributed, the record label, Fat Wreck Chords, initially refused to distribute it; this was at the behest of the label's employees and was despite label owner Fat Mike being a member of the band. This prompted the Gimme Gimmes to record five additional songs to make the album acceptable to those employees. Even after the addition of the new recordings, guitarist Joey Cape felt that Take a Break was the band's "worst record".

== Critical reception ==
Professional ratings
Review scores
| Source | Rating |
|---|---|
| The Age | 4/5 stars |
| AllMusic | 4.5/5 stars |
| Alternative Press | 4/5 |
| AMP | (favorable) |
| The Buffalo News | 3/5 stars |
| The Hartford Courant | (favorable) |
| The Maneater | (mixed) |
| Moose Jaw Times-Herald | 2.5/4 stars |
| Post Register | (unfavorable) |
| Reno Gazette-Journal | 1.5/4 stars |

Mackenzie Wilson of AllMusic praised Take a Break as superior to the band's previous outing, Blow in the Wind, saying it was rock & roll done "the right way". Andrew Parks of the Buffalo News praised the "infectious takes" on R&B songs, and the "sly songwriting touches" that the Gimme Gimmes included, while Roger Catlin in the Hartford Courant described it as "giddy fun". Richard Baker of The Age described the middle section of the album as "the Gimmes at their best", and Darryl Sterdan in the London Free Press was similarly positive about the middle tracks "Nothing Compares 2 U", "Isn't She Lovely", and "I'll Be There". Dan MacEachern of the Moose Jaw Times-Herald and Jeremy Plothow of the Post Register gave negative reviews, each saying that the band's formula had become tired, and Mark Robison in the Reno Gazette-Journal wrote that the song selections were uninspired.

== Track listing ==
| No. | Title | Writer(s) | Original performer | Length |
|---|---|---|---|---|
| 1. | "Where Do Broken Hearts Go" | Frank Wildhorn, Chuck Jackson | Whitney Houston | 2:30 |
| 2. | "Hello" | Lionel Richie | Lionel Richie | 2:18 |
| 3. | "End of the Road" | Kenneth "Babyface" Edmonds, Antonio "L.A." Reid, Daryl Simmons | Boyz II Men | 3:00 |
| 4. | "Ain't No Sunshine" | Bill Withers | Bill Withers | 1:44 |
| 5. | "Nothing Compares 2 U" | Prince | The Family | 2:39 |
| 6. | "Crazy" (contains an interpretation of "Six Pack" by Black Flag, written by Greg Ginn) | Seal, Guy Sigsworth | Seal | 3:08 |
| 7. | "Isn't She Lovely" | Stevie Wonder | Stevie Wonder | 2:25 |
| 8. | "I Believe I Can Fly" | R. Kelly | R. Kelly | 3:01 |
| 9. | "Oh Girl" (contains an interpretation of "Race Against Time" by GBH) | Eugene Record | The Chi-Lites | 1:58 |
| 10. | "I'll Be There" (contains an interpretation of "Just What I Needed" by The Cars, written by Ric Ocasek) | Berry Gordy, Bob West, Hal Davis, Willie Hutch | The Jackson 5 | 2:07 |
| 11. | "Mona Lisa" | Ray Evans, Jay Livingston | Nat King Cole | 2:50 |
| 12. | "Save the Best for Last" (contains an interpretation of "Pretty Vacant" by the Sex Pistols) | Phil Galdston, Wendy Waldman, Jon Lind | Vanessa Williams | 2:05 |
| 13. | "Natural Woman" | Gerry Goffin, Carole King, Jerry Wexler | Aretha Franklin | 2:37 |

== Personnel ==
- Spike Slawson - vocals
- Chris Shiflett (a.k.a. Jake Jackson) - lead guitar
- Joey Cape - rhythm guitar
- Fat Mike - bass
- Dave Raun - drums

== Charts ==
Chart performance for Take a Break
| Chart (2003) | Peak position |
|---|---|
| Australian Heavy Rock & Metal Albums (ARIA) | 13 |
| Australian Hitseekers Albums (ARIA) | 4 |
| Canadian Albums (Nielsen SoundScan) | 93 |
| UK Independent Albums (Official Charts) | 20 |
| US Billboard 200 | 131 |
| US Independent Albums (Billboard) | 6 |
