= The Soap Factory =

Building in Aberdeen, Scotland

Coordinates: 57.151°N 2.0991°W

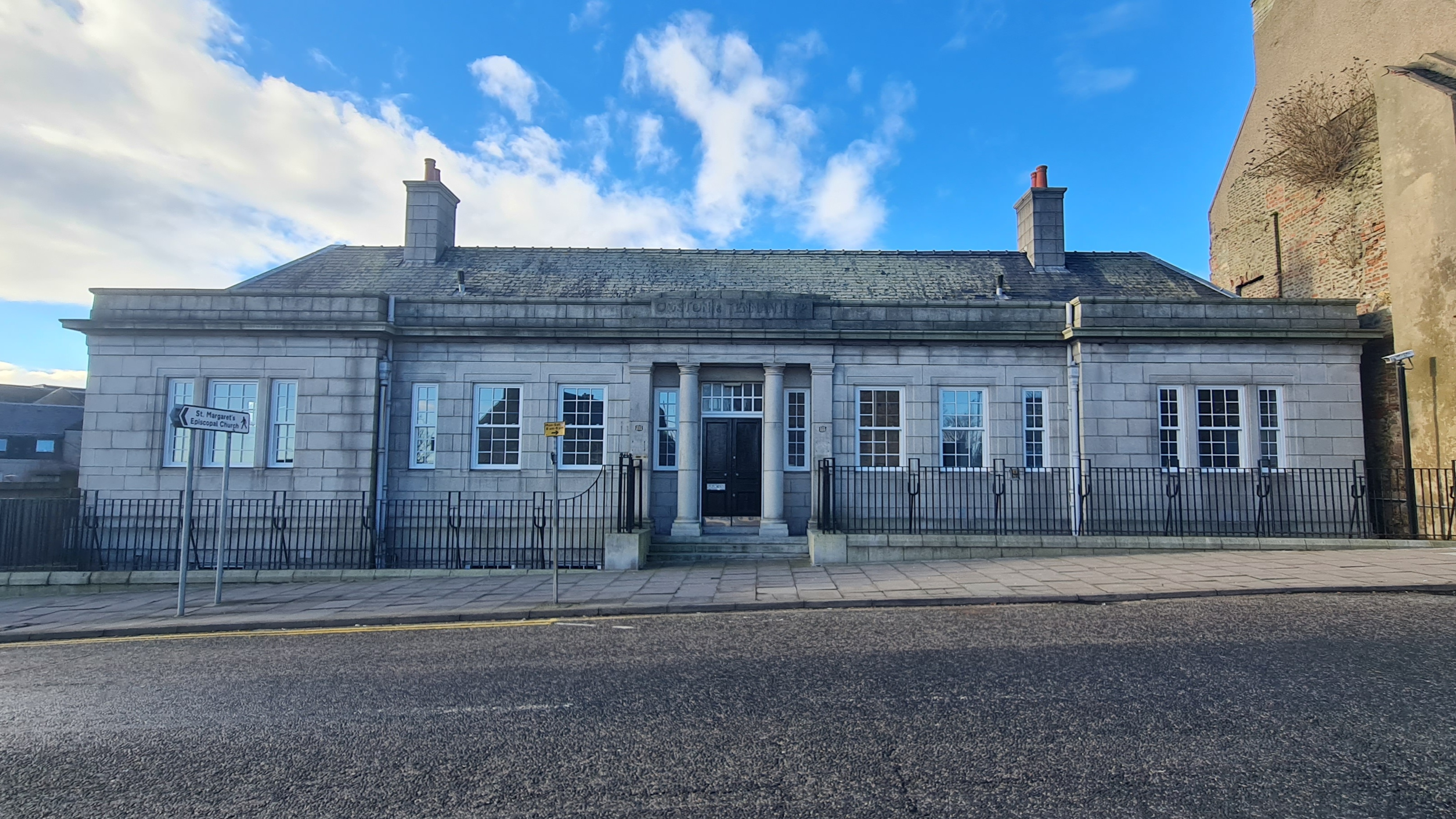
- Address: 111 Gallowgate, Aberdeen

Listed Building – Category C(S)
- Official name: 111 Gallowgate including boundary wall and railings
- Designated: 29 November 1994
- Reference no.: LB20316

The Soap Factory is a building in Aberdeen, Scotland. It was built in 1922 for Ogston & Tennant, a company which manufactured soaps and candles, and was designed to be the formal office and to stand detached from the main factory and warehouses, which opened onto Loch Street. Ogston & Tennant ceased trading in the 1970s. It is a category C listed building.

In 2025 Code The City, a civic hacking organisation promoting open data, took on the building.

== The building ==
The architect credited with the design of 111 Gallowgate is Alexander Mavor who designed the soap-works for Ogston & Tennant. Alexander Mavor trained as a builder in London before moving to Scotland and joining William Henderson & Sons architectural practice. He became a partner there before leaving to start his own business.

The building on the Gallowgate side has a low classical profile and is built from Kemnay granite. The main entrance has granite steps leading up to two Doric columns set either side of a recessed timbered door. The listing makes particular mention of the granite boundary wall topped with decorative metal railings. To the rear is the basement which is built from brick, not granite, and housed Ogston & Tennant's industrial laboratories.

In 1941 the Loch Street side of the factory site was bombed. At some point in the 1970s Ogston and Tennant ceased trading and the building was then used as a Waldorf school. The interior of the building has been modernised to include serviced office and media space.

== Ogston & Tennant ==
Ogston & Tennant Ltd. was formed in 1898 from two companies joining A. Ogston & Sons and Charles Tennant and Co. At the time of the merger Ogstons already owned both a factory and warehouses in Loch Street, Aberdeen. On 9 March 1910 the company won damages against the Glasgow Daily Record for defamation. This was in connection with another libel, by the Daily Mail against Lever Brothers. It totalled £9,000 and the news was reported around the world.

On 27 June 1910 they suffered a great fire which engulfed and destroyed the factory. Reports mention machinery crashing through the floors. Damage totalled £80,000. In 1911 the company agreed to an "association" with Lever Brothers and after the Second World War, they became part of the company until they ceased trading in the 1970s.
