= Have a Ball =

Studio album by Me First and the Gimme Gimmes
- Released: July 29, 1997
- Genre: Punk rock
- Length: 28:48
- Label: Fat Wreck Chords

Me First and the Gimme Gimmes chronology
Have a Ball (1997)	Are a Drag (1999)

Have a Ball is the debut studio album by Me First and the Gimme Gimmes, released in 1997 on the Fat Wreck Chords independent record label. The album is made up entirely of "Hits of the '60s and '70s", with the exception of Billy Joel's "Uptown Girl", originally released in 1983.

== Critical reception ==
Professional ratings
Review scores
Source	Rating
AllMusic	4/5 stars
Maximum Rocknroll	(favorable)
Nanaimo Daily News	4/5 stars
NME	7/10

Larry Katz of the Boston Herald said that the album was an "unforgettable" album of 1997, despite being relatively little-known, and that the band's gimmick of recording cross-genre covers was a "darn good" joke. Noel Murray, writing in Nashville Scene, praised the record as being fun while not overly long, and said that the rearrangements of familiar older songs allowed listeners to better appreciate the writing of those songs.

== Track listing ==
No.	Title	Writer(s)	Original performer	Length
1.	"Danny's Song"	Kenny Loggins	Loggins and Messina	2:10
2.	"Leaving on a Jet Plane" (from Denver)	John Denver	John Denver	2:32
3.	"Me & Julio Down By The Schoolyard" (from Paul)	Paul Simon	Paul Simon	2:42
4.	"One Tin Soldier"	Dennis Lambert, Brian Potter	Original Caste	2:01
5.	"Uptown Girl" (from Billy)	Billy Joel	Billy Joel	2:22
6.	"I Am a Rock" (from Garf)	Paul Simon	Simon & Garfunkel	2:04
7.	"Sweet Caroline" (from Diamond)	Neil Diamond	Neil Diamond	2:53
8.	"Seasons in the Sun"	Jacques Brel	Terry Jacks	2:27
9.	"Fire and Rain" (from In Your Barcalounger)	James Taylor	James Taylor	1:24
10.	"Nobody Does It Better" (from The Spy Who Loved Me)	Carole Bayer Sager, Marvin Hamlisch	Carly Simon	2:28
11.	"Mandy" (from Barry)	Scott English, Richard Kerr	Barry Manilow	2:27
12.	"Rocket Man" (from Elton)	Elton John, Bernie Taupin	Elton John	3:15

== Personnel ==
- Spike Slawson – vocals
- Chris Shiflett (a.k.a. Jake Jackson) – lead guitar
- Joey Cape – rhythm guitar
- Fat Mike – bass
- Dave Raun – drums

== See also ==
- Me First and the Gimme Gimmes discography
