= Are a Drag =

Studio album by Me First and the Gimme Gimmes
- Released: May 18, 1999
- Genre: Punk rock
- Length: 25:58
- Label: Fat Wreck Chords
- Producer: Ryan Greene, Me First and the Gimme Gimmes

Me First and the Gimme Gimmes chronology
| Have a Ball (1997) | Are a Drag (1999) | Turn Japanese (2001) |

Professional ratings
Review scores
| Source | Rating |
|---|---|
| Allmusic | 4/5 stars |
| Las Vegas Sun | (favorable) |
| The Maneater | (favorable) |
| Maximum Rocknroll | (mixed) |

Are a Drag is the second album by Me First and the Gimme Gimmes, released in 1999 on the Fat Wreck Chords independent record label.

The album is made up mainly of show tunes. The album's title alludes to the fact that most of the songs on the album feature vocalist Spike Slawson singing songs that were originally performed by female characters in their original stage shows/movies (with the exception of the Phantom's part in "Phantom of the Opera", "Science Fiction/Double Feature" which was sung by a female traditionally, but more popularly by Richard O'Brien in The Rocky Horror Picture Show, and "Rainbow Connection").

The album's cover features the members of the band dressed up, in drag, as five characters from the musicals represented in song: a member of A Chorus Line ("What I Did For Love"), Annie Mudge from Annie ("Tomorrow"), Dorothy Gale from The Wizard of Oz ("Over the Rainbow"), Sandy Dumbrowski from Grease ("It's Raining on Prom Night"), and Dr. Frank-N-Furter from The Rocky Horror Show ("Science Fiction/Double Feature").

Like many other Gimme Gimmes albums, Are a Drag contains many elements of mash-up - more specifically, musical allusions to punk or power-pop songs in their covers. The intro to the song "My Favorite Things" quotes "Generator", by Bad Religion, and at the end of "Tomorrow", Fat Mike can be heard singing "Mommy's alright, daddy's alright, they just seem a little weird" - a lyric from "Surrender" by Cheap Trick.

Geoff Carter, writing in the Las Vegas Sun, described the album as "infectious" and "oh-so-satisfying", though warned that it may become less enjoyable with repeat listening.

== Track listing ==
| No. | Title | Lyrics | Music | Musical | Length |
|---|---|---|---|---|---|
| 1. | "Over the Rainbow" | E. Y. Harburg | Harold Arlen | The Wizard of Oz | 1:32 |
| 2. | "Don't Cry for Me Argentina" | Tim Rice | Andrew Lloyd Webber | Evita | 2:29 |
| 3. | "Science Fiction/Double Feature" | Richard O'Brien | O'Brien | The Rocky Horror Show | 2:34 |
| 4. | "Summertime" | DuBose Heyward, Dorothy Heyward, Ira Gershwin | George Gershwin | Porgy and Bess | 2:10 |
| 5. | "My Favorite Things" (contains an interpolation of "Generator" by Bad Religion, written by Brett Gurewitz) | Oscar Hammerstein II | Richard Rodgers | The Sound of Music | 1:52 |
| 6. | "Rainbow Connection" | Paul Williams, Kenneth Ascher | Williams, Ascher | The Muppet Movie | 2:18 |
| 7. | "Phantom of the Opera" | Charles Hart, Richard Stilgoe, Mike Batt | Andrew Lloyd Webber | The Phantom of the Opera | 1:45 |
| 8. | "I Sing the Body Electric" | Dean Pitchford | Michael Gore | Fame | 1:44 |
| 9. | "It's Raining on Prom Night" | Jim Jacobs, Warren Casey | Jacobs, Casey | Grease | 2:57 |
| 10. | "Tomorrow" (contains an interpolation of "Surrender" by Cheap Trick, written by Rick Nielsen) | Martin Charnin | Charles Strouse | Annie | 1:31 |
| 11. | "What I Did for Love" | Edward Kleban | Marvin Hamlisch | A Chorus Line | 1:46 |
| 12. | "Cabaret" | Fred Ebb | John Kander | Cabaret | 3:24 |

== Personnel ==
- Spike Slawson - vocals
- Chris Shiflett (a.k.a. Jake Jackson) - lead guitar
- Joey Cape - rhythm guitar
- Fat Mike - bass
- Dave Raun - drums

=== Additional musicians ===
- Karina Denike - backing vocals
- Sara K. Fisher - backing vocals
