= Spike Slawson =

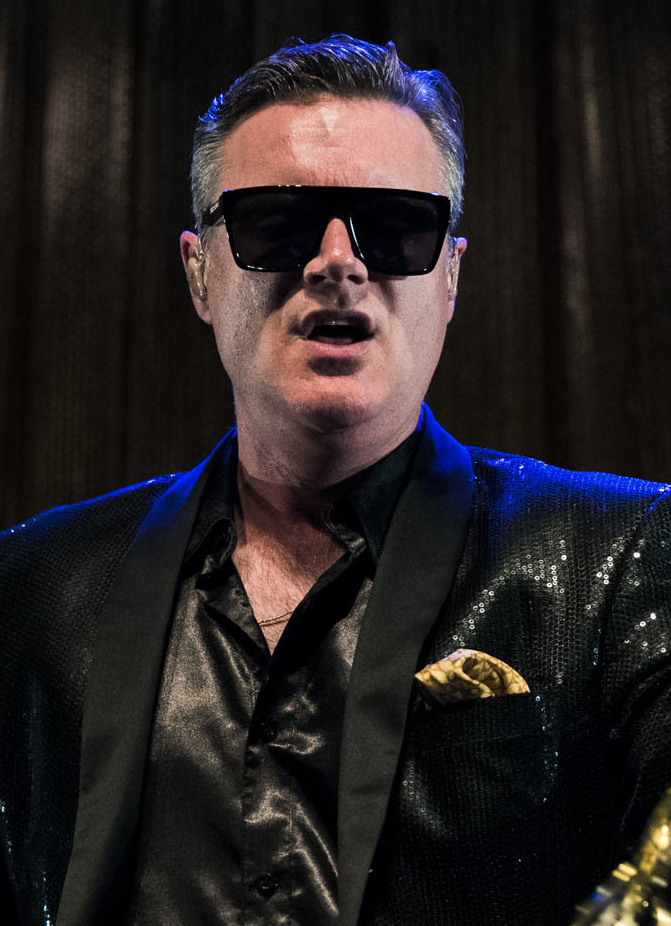
- Slawson performing in 2017

Background information
- Born: Sean Slawson; April 9, 1970 (age 56)
- Occupation: Musician
- Instruments: Vocals, bass, ukulele, guitar
- Years active: 1995–present

Sean "Spike" Slawson (born April 9, 1970) is an American punk rock musician, a member of Spike and the Gimme Gimmes, Swingin' Utters, Filthy Thievin' Bastards, Re-Volts, Uke-Hunt, and Los Nuevos Bajos.

== Early life and musical career ==
Having grown up in Pittsburgh, Slawson worked in the mail order department of the record label Fat Wreck Chords (which is the subject of a song by The Aquabats titled "Dear Spike").

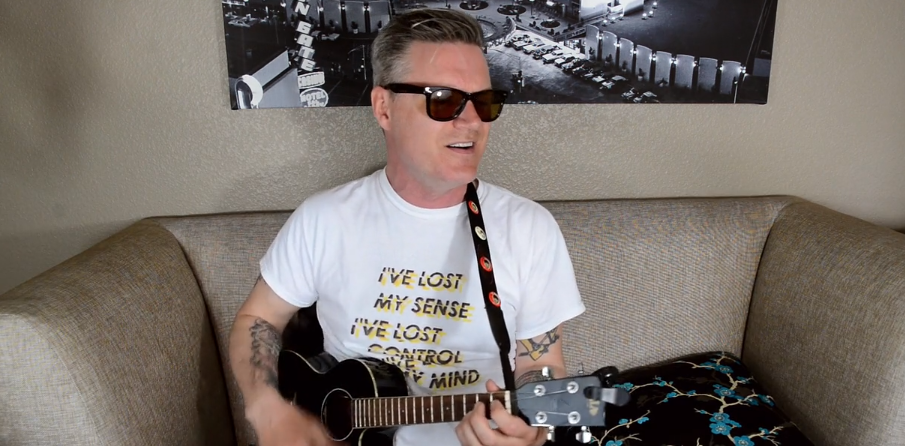
Spike Slawson performing "Crazy for You" by Madonna in a Punks in Vegas session of 2015.

He later joined Me First and the Gimme Gimmes, a cover band and supergroup consisting primarily of members of Fat Wreck bands that formed in 1995. Slawson serves as the group's lead singer, and in 2025, the band changed its name to Spike and the Gimme Gimmes. From 1997 to 2012, he was the bassist for Swingin' Utters. He also plays bass in Filthy Thieving Bastards, sings and plays bass for the Re-Volts, and sings and plays ukulele for Uke-Hunt. In 2018, Slawson and a group of Panamanian musicians formed Los Nuevos Bajos, a Latin post-punk band that primarily covers classic boleros, with Slawson serving as lead singer.

== Discography ==
=== With Me First and the Gimme Gimmes ===
- Have a Ball (1997)
- Are a Drag (1999)
- Blow in the Wind (2001)
- Take a Break (2003)
- Ruin Jonny's Bar Mitzvah (2004)
- Love Their Country (2006)
- Have Another Ball (2008)
- Go Down Under (2011)
- Sing in Japanese (2011)
- Are We Not Men? We Are Diva! (2014)
- Blow it…at Madison’s Quinceañera! (2024)

=== With Swingin' Utters ===
- Five Lessons Learned (1998)
- BYO Split Series Volume II (1999)
- Brazen Head E.P. (1999)
- Teen Idol Eyes (1999)
- Swingin' Utters (2000)
- Fat Club (2001)
- Dead Flowers, Bottles, Bluegrass, and Bones (2003)
- Live in a Dive (2004)
- Hatest Grits: B-Sides and Bullshit (2008)
- Brand New Lungs (2010)
- "Taking The Long Way" (2010)
- Here, Under Protest (2011)
- The Librarians Are Hiding Something (2012)
- Stuck in a Circle - 2013

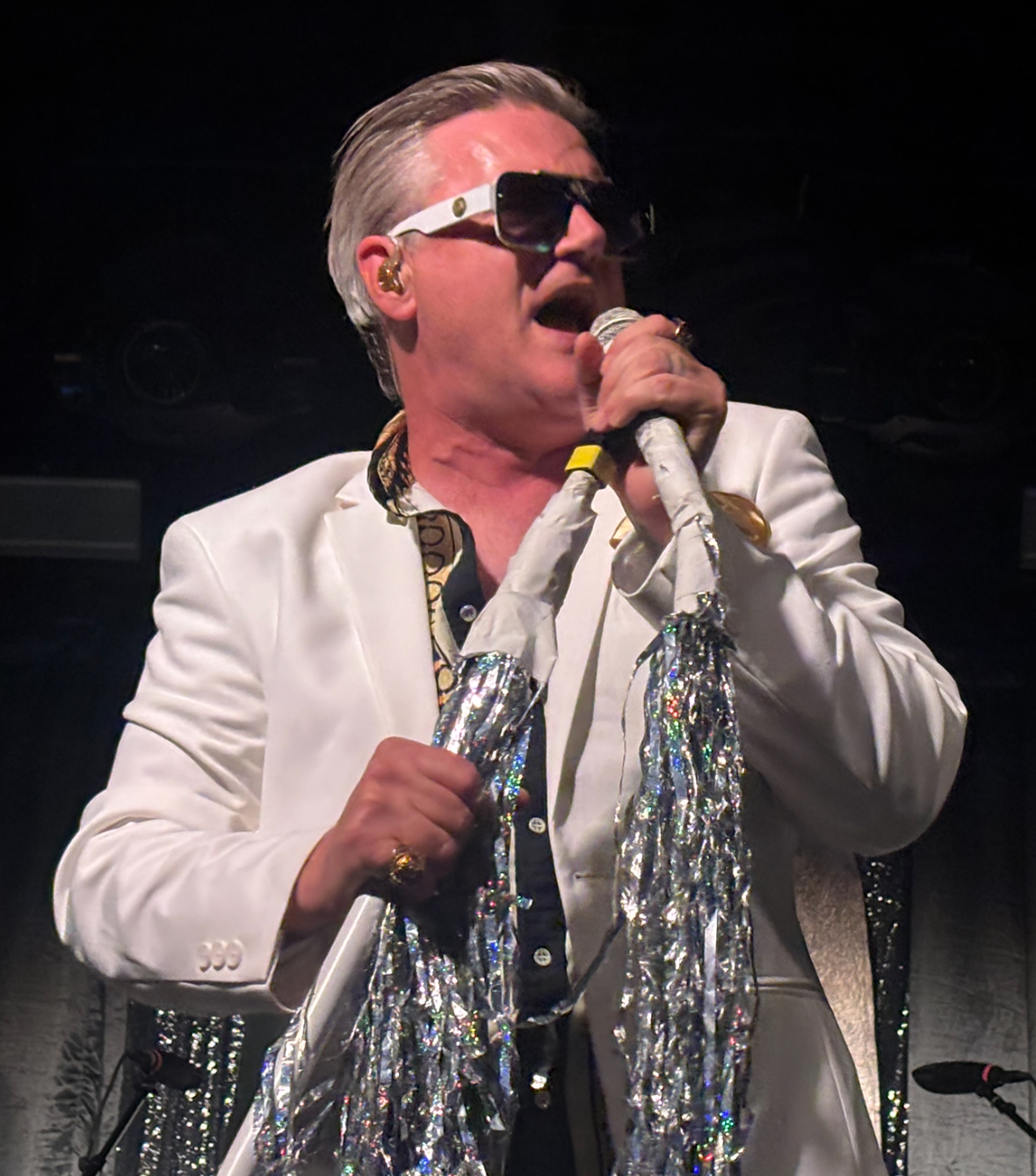
Spike Slawson performing with Spike and the Gimme Gimmes in Asbury Park on August 3, 2025.

=== With Filthy Thieving Bastards ===
- Our Fathers Sent Us (2000)
- A Melody of Retreads and Broken Quills (2001)
- My Pappy Was a Pistol (2005)
- I'm A Son of a Gun (2007)

=== With Re-Volts ===
- Re-Volts (2007)

=== With Uke Hunt ===
- "The Prettiest Star" (2014)
- Uke-Hunt (2014)

=== With Los Nuevos Bajos ===
- Cien Años/Gema (2019)
- Rebájate con Los Nuevos Bajos (2023)

=== Other appearances ===
- The Dwarves – The Dwarves Are Young and Good Looking (1997)
- NOFX – So Long and Thanks for All the Shoes (1997)
- No Use for a Name – Making Friends (1997)
- NOFX – The Decline (1999)
- No Use for a Name – More Betterness! (1999)
- The Dwarves – Come Clean (2000)
- The Dwarves – "Way Out!" (2000)
- NOFX – Pump Up the Valuum (2000)
- The Real McKenzies – Oot & Aboot (2003)
- The Dwarves – "Salt Lake City" (2004)
- Lagwagon – Resolve (2005)
- Punk Rock Karaoke – Punk Rock Karaoke (2008)
- NOFX – Coaster (2009)
- NOFX – Cokie the Clown (2009)
- The Dwarves – Dwarves (2011)
- NOFX – Self Entitled (2012)
- NOFX – "Xmas Has Been X'ed/New Year's Revolution" (2009)
