= Spike and the Gimme Gimmes =

American punk rock band

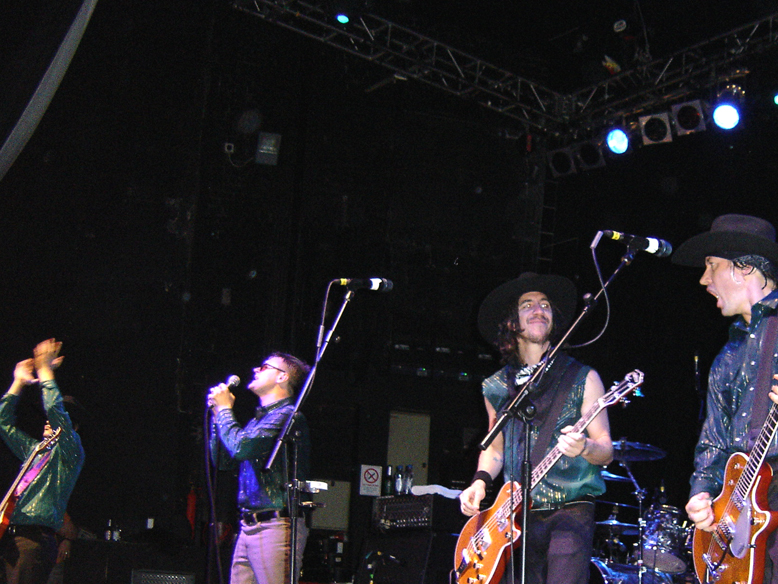
- The band performing as Me First and the Gimme Gimmes in 2007

Background information
- Also known as: Me First and the Gimme Gimmes
- Origin: San Francisco, California, United States
- Genres: Punk rock; pop-punk; skate punk
- Years active: 1995–present
- Labels: Fat Wreck Chords; Pizza of Death
- Members: Spike Slawson; Joey Cape; C. J. Ramone; Jake Kiley; John Reis; Andrew Pinching
- Past members: Chris Shiflett; Fat Mike; Dave Raun

Spike and the Gimme Gimmes (previously Me First and the Gimme Gimmes) are a punk rock supergroup and cover band that formed in San Francisco, California in 1995. The band's current lineup consists of Spike Slawson, C. J. Ramone, Joey Cape, Pinch and John Reis. Dave Raun, Chris Shiflett, and Fat Mike are former members.

The Gimmes work exclusively as a cover band. They specialize in rapid-fire punk interpretations of a wide range of songs, often with a humorous edge. The band also incorporates melodies and riffs of classic punk songs into their performances.

The band was originally named after a children's book by Gerald G. Jampolsky and Diane V. Cirincione.

== History ==
The band's first release came with 1995's Denver, a 7" single released on band member Fat Mike's record label Fat Wreck Chords, featuring two John Denver covers. The band released four more singles in 1996 and 1997, each on a different label and named after the artist covered on that particular release, as well as some compilation appearances. Their first full-length album, Have a Ball, was released July 29, 1997, and is still their best-selling record.

Each album by the band has a different theme: Have a Ball focuses on classic 1960s, 1970s, and early 1980s songs by singer/songwriters like Elton John, Neil Diamond, and John Denver; Are a Drag consists entirely of show tunes, Blow in the Wind of '60s classics, and Take a Break of contemporary R&B songs (by artists such as Boyz II Men, Lionel Richie, and Vanessa L. Williams). Their fifth album, Ruin Jonny's Bar Mitzvah (recorded live at a bar mitzvah), consists of pop music from the 1960s through the 1980s by artists such as REO Speedwagon, Styx and The Beatles, as well as traditional songs like "Hava Nagila". The compilation album Have Another Ball features '60s–'80s classics.

The band entered the studio on April 3, 2006, to work on their sixth album, Love Their Country, which was released on October 17, 2006. The theme of this album is country and western, and includes covers of tracks by Dixie Chicks, Garth Brooks, Hank Williams, Sr. and Johnny Cash. Prior to the release of the album, Fat Wreck Chords released a digital label sampler, iFloyd which included "(Ghost) Riders in the Sky" by the band.

In August 2006 Me First and the Gimme Gimmes were scheduled to play three dates at PNC Park after Pirates games, but after they got booed on the first night, the next two nights were cancelled. They were to play along with fireworks during the post-game "Skyblast" shows. In late 2006, Fat Wreck Chords released another digital label sampler, Christmas Bonus, containing a previously unreleased cover of Steve Goodman's "City of New Orleans".[1]

On December 5, 2007, Fat Wreck Chords released a flash MP3 holiday bonus sampler called Hanuk-Comp containing "The Boxer", originally released on the 1997 Garf single. There is also a downloadable podcast that features commentary from Fat Mike and Floyd during breaks between songs in which the next album is revealed.

The compilation Have Another Ball was released on July 8, 2008; it comprises all the B-sides from the Have a Ball singles, plus covers of "Sodomy" (from Hair) and Diana Ross's "Theme from Mahogany (Do You Know Where You're Going To)".

Fat Wreck Chords released Go Down Under on February 1, 2011, featuring covers of five songs by Australian artists. On September 13, 2011 (in anticipation of a tour of Japan) Fat Wreck Chords released a five-song EP, Sing in Japanese.

In a Reddit AMA on January 28, 2014, Fat Mike revealed the next album theme would be "Divas". Featuring covers of Barbra Streisand, Christina Aguilera and Lady Gaga, Are We Not Men? We Are Diva! was released on May 13, 2014, on Fat Wreck Chords.

On November 30, 2018, they released a cover of "Santa Baby".

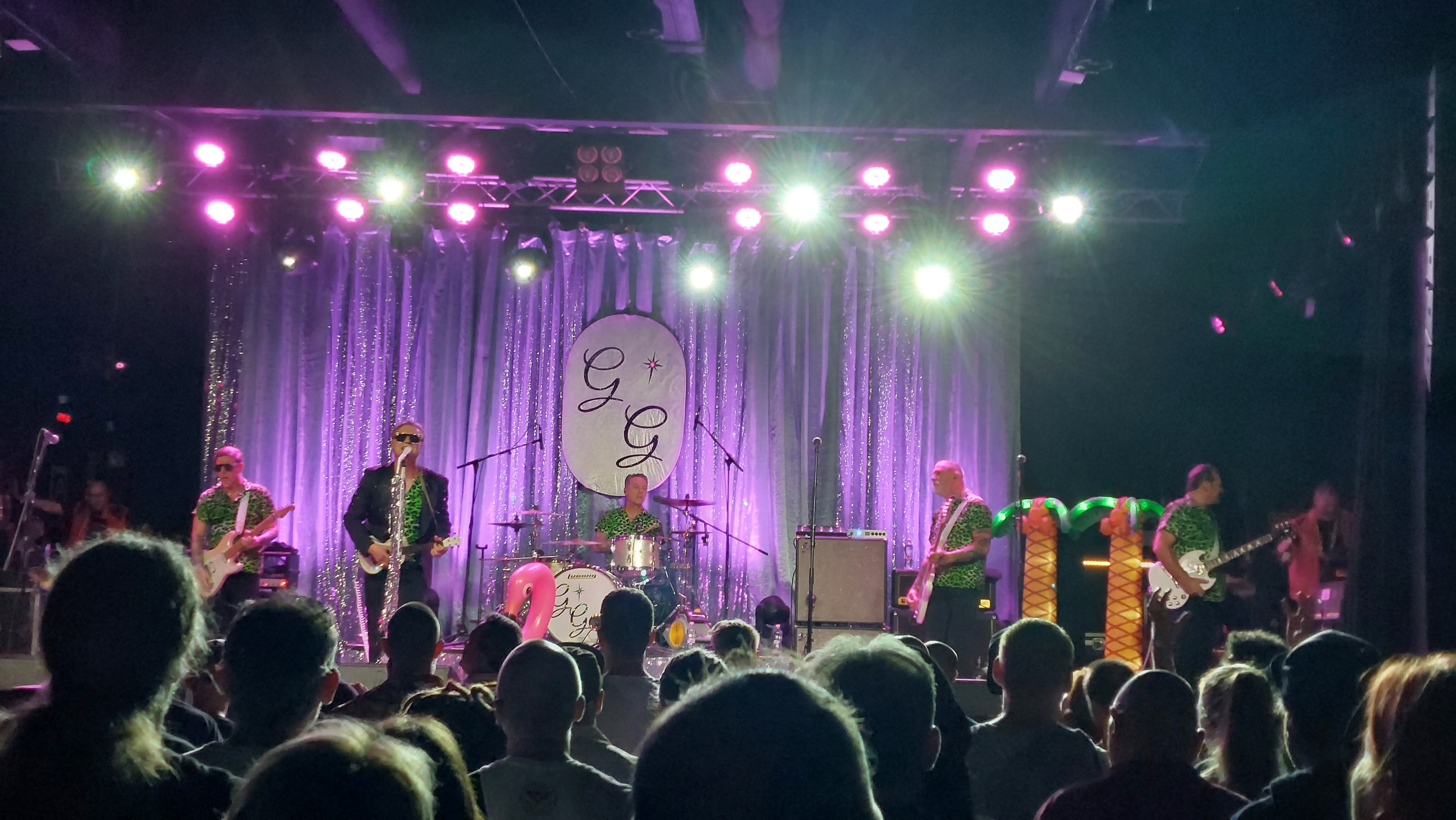
Me First and the Gimme Gimmes in 2025 (Budapest, Hungary)

On June 7, 2019, Chris Shiflett took part in a Reddit AMA. When asked about The Gimmes he revealed he is "No longer involved", although he did not specify exactly when he left the band. He noted that "When the Gimmes decided to start releasing songs that I didn't play on it was time for me to leave", adding in another comment that it was "on bad terms".

In May 2021, the band announced a livestream event called Saturday Night Special. The lineup for the show was Spike Slawson, Joey Cape, Scott Shiflett, CJ Ramone, and Pinch, with Fat Mike making a guest appearance.

In July 2023, the Gimmes "gave away" and performed at a quinceañera in Las Vegas. It was later confirmed by Slawson that this event was recorded by Fat Wreck Chords for the band's next album. On April 9, 2024, the band confirmed the album would be released on June 14, 2024, and be called Me First and The Gimme Gimmes ¡Blow it ... at Madison's Quinceañera!. The first single from the album, a cover of ABBA's "Dancing Queen," was released on the same day.

On April 21, 2025, founders Fat Mike and Slawson announced that going forward, the touring band would be billed as Spike and the Gimme Gimmes. No reason was given for this change.

On July 22nd, 2026, Spike and the Gimme Gimmes released their first single under the new moniker, a cover of USA for Africa's "We Are The World". Like the original song, the cover is a charity single; in this instance, it is to benefit the Sweet Relief Musicians Fund. Also like the original, the song features multiple guest vocalists including Milo Aukerman, Nikki Corvette, Dani Miller, Jim Lindberg, Tony Reflex, Blag Dahlia, Dickey Barrett, and Stacey Dee. Included in the music video are cameos by Marc Orrell, Tokyo Hiro, Channel 3, and director Josh Roush. With the release of the single, the band also officially announced their forthcoming album Spike and the Gimme Gimmes Shit The Bed.

== Members ==
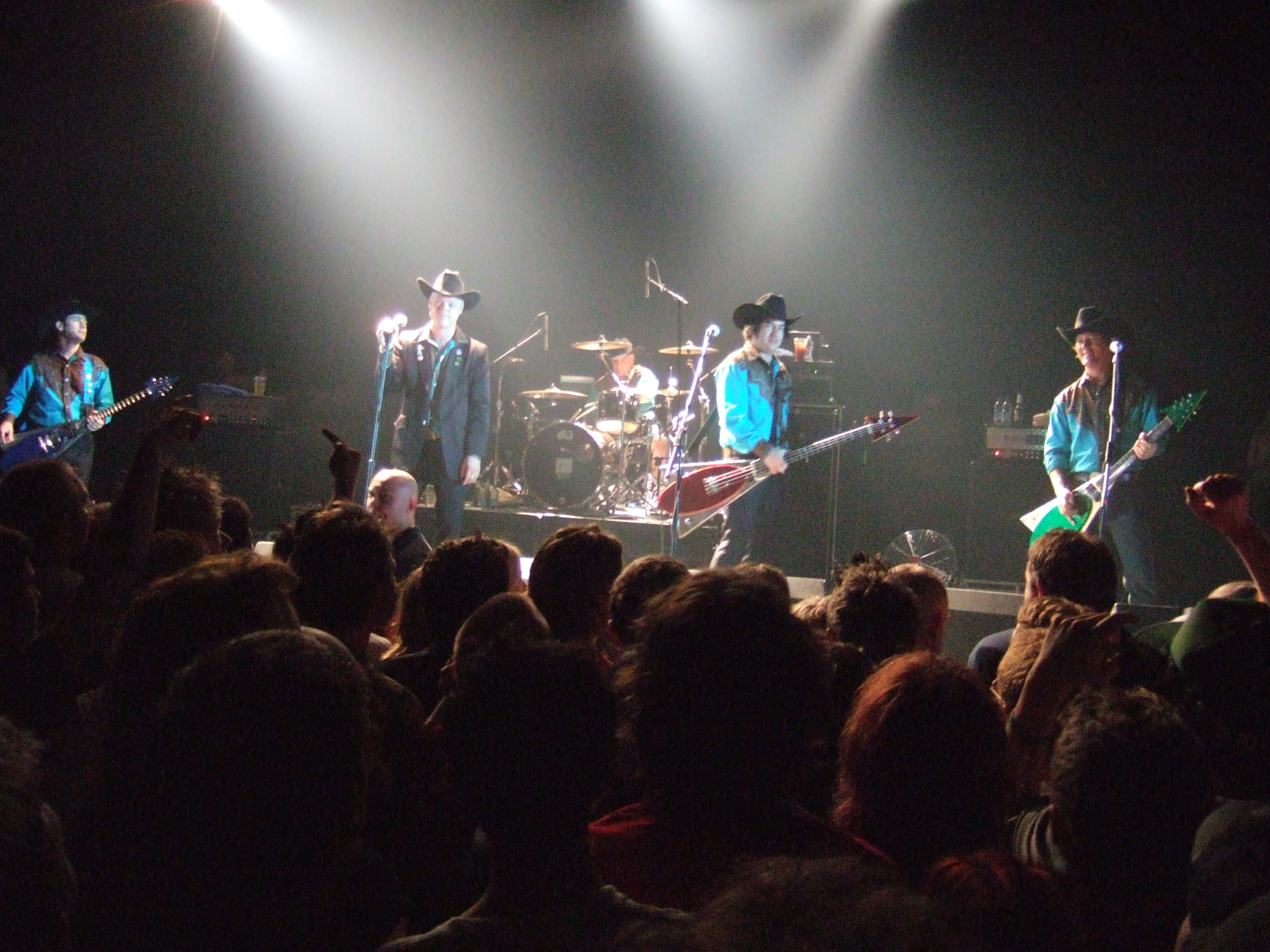
The core lineup in 2006, left to right: Cape, Slawson, Raun, Fat Mike, and "Jake Jackson" (Chris Shiflett)

- Spike Slawson (of Swingin' Utters and Re-Volts) – lead vocals (1995–present)
- CJ Ramone (of The Ramones) – bass, backing vocals (2018–present)
- Joey Cape (of Lagwagon) – guitar, backing vocals (1995–present)

Past members

- Chris Shiflett (of Foo Fighters and No Use for a Name) – guitar, backing vocals (1995–2019)
- Fat Mike (of NOFX) – bass, backing vocals (1995–2019)
- Dave Raun (of Lagwagon and RKL) – drums (1995–2019)

Former touring musicians

- Brian Baker (of Minor Threat and Bad Religion) filled in for Shiflett in 2006.
- Chris Shiflett's brother, Scott Shiflett (of Face to Face and Viva Death), filled in for him on multiple tours in the late 2010s.
- NOFX guitarist Eric Melvin filled in for Fat Mike on bass during the 2007 European tour and 2008 and 2013 Australian tours.
- Adam Stern from Youth Brigade and Royal Crown Revue has filled in for Fat Mike on bass
- Mark Mortenson from Screw 32 has filled in for Dave Raun on drums.
  - Grant McIntire, also from Screw 32, has filled in for Joey Cape on guitar.
- Barry d'live Ward from Rich Kids on LSD and Crosstops filled in for Chris Shiflett on guitar during the 1996 tour.
- Warren Fitzgerald of The Vandals and Lindsay McDougall of Frenzal Rhomb filled in on guitar during the band's participation in the 2003 Livid Festival in Australia.
  - McDougall has also filled in during a spring 2017 tour of North America, a South America tour in April 2018, and well as a European tour in 2019.
- Since 2014, Jay Bentley of Bad Religion was the band's regular touring bassist, substituting for Fat Mike, until CJ Ramone took over that role in the late 2010s.
- On a spring 2017 tour, Chris Cheney of The Living End filled in on guitar.
- Christopher Ward, a.k.a. CJ Ramone, joined for the 2018 Summer Tour, as invited by Jay Bentley. CJ returned in 2021 to launch a tour opening for Violent Femmes and Flogging Molly, and later returned for the 2023 Australian tour.
- Stacey Dee of Bad Cop/Bad Cop filled in for Joey Cape on some dates on the European Tour 2019.
  - Dee also joined on rhythm guitar for the Winter 2024 tour of the UK and Ireland.
- John "The Swami" Reis of Rocket from the Crypt made his debut with the band in 2021, opening for Violent Femmes and Flogging Molly. Swami was also a member of their Australian tour in 2023.
- Andrew "Pinch" Pinching, drummer for The Damned, has performed with the band at two one-off shows in 2021 and 2022.
- Jonny "2 Bags" Wickersham of Social Distortion filled in for a one-off show in 2021.
- Jake Kiley of Strung Out has played lead guitar for the Gimmies for various stints from May 2023 onwards.
- Andrew McKeag of The Presidents of the United States of America and David Hidalgo Jr. of Social Distortion were both fill-ins for the band's 2024 tour, on guitar and drums respectively.
- Dan Goatham, bass player in Snuff, filled in on rhythm guitar during the 2025 Christmas UK tour. In late 2026, he returned to join them on their European mainland tour.

== Costumes ==
The Gimmes have a gimmick of wearing quirky matching costumes during their live shows. Some of the themes match the albums, such as when they dress in cowboy outfits to accompany the album Love Their Country or in drag as various characters from musicals in Are a Drag. They have also worn pajamas, red suits, cheerleader outfits, shiny suits and fezzes, and, during one show in Camden, NJ on the Warped Tour, dressed as the band AFI (who in turn dressed as The Gimmes). Their most common costume is a set of matching Hawaiian shirts of varying styles and colors.

== Discography ==
=== Albums ===
- Have a Ball (1997)
- Are a Drag (1999)
- Blow in the Wind (2001)
- Take a Break (2003)
- Ruin Jonny's Bar Mitzvah (2004)
- Love Their Country (2006)
- Have Another Ball (2008)
- Sing in Japanese (2011)
- Go Down Under (2011)
- Are We Not Men? We Are Diva! (2014)
- Rake it In: The Greatestest Hits (2017)
- ¡Blow it...at Madison's Quinceañera! (2024)
- Shit The Bed (2026; as Spike and the Gimme Gimmes)
