= Dave Raun =

American drummer

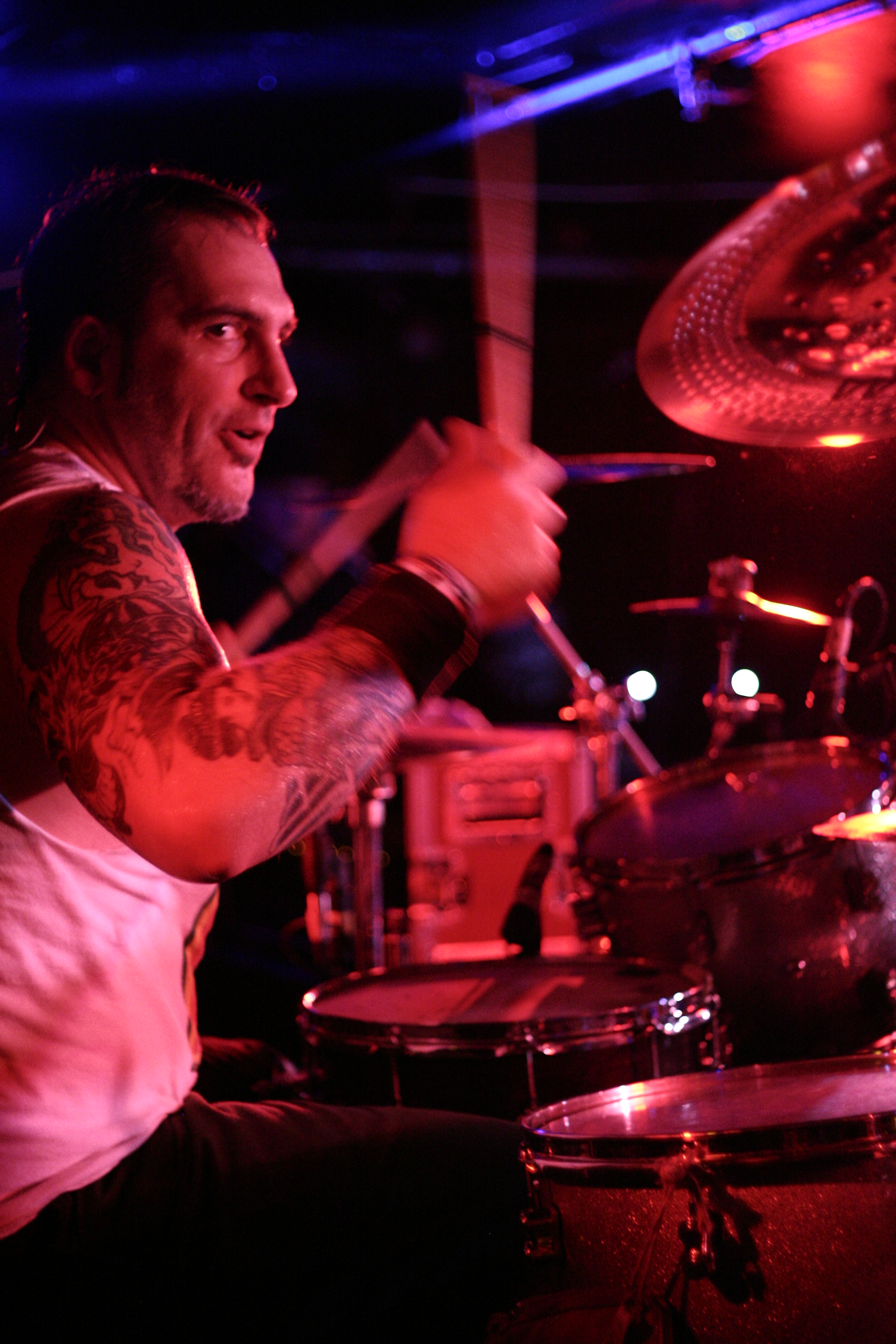
- Dave Raun drumming for Lagwagon on October 16, 2012 at Middle East Club, Cambridge, MA.

Background information
- Born: June 7, 1970 (age 56)
- Genres: Skate punk, punk rock, pop punk
- Occupation: Musician
- Instruments: Drums, percussion
- Years active: 1989–present
- Labels: Fat Wreck Chords, Epitaph Records

Dave Raun (born June 7, 1970) a resident of Fresno, California, is the drummer for the seminal California punk rock band Lagwagon. He also filled in on drums for a short period for Sean "SC" Sellers of Good Riddance. Additionally, Raun drummed for the punk rock cover band/supergroup Me First and the Gimme Gimmes until 2019, with fellow Lagwagon member Joey Cape. Me First and the Gimme Gimmes also features members of NOFX, Swingin' Utters, Ramones and Foo Fighters.

== Career ==
Raun, a native of San Mateo, California, began his career in the mid to late '80's drumming in numerous bands before joining California hardcore punk band Rich Kids on LSD in 1992. Raun joined Lagwagon in 1996, replacing original drummer Derrick Plourde. Most recently, he has been seen drumming for Hot Water Music and Black President.

== Personal life ==
Raun is married to Laura Slippy.
