= Jack Dalrymple (musician) =

American musician

- Genres: Punk rock
- Occupations: Musician, songwriter
- Instruments: Vocals, guitar
- Years active: 1995–present
- Labels: Fat Wreck Chords; BYO Records; Adeline Records

Jack Dalrymple is an American musician, hailing out of San Francisco, California, who started his music career in 1996 with his first band One Man Army. They released their first EP entitled Shooting Blanks in 1996. One Man Army found moderate success in the late 90s punk rock explosion due to Jack's unique voice and melodic style of writing. They played on Warped Tour, the 2001 Holidays in the Sun Festival, traveled the world touring and released 3 full-length albums and a split full length with Alkaline Trio before breaking up in 2004.

Jack formed the punk rock band Dead To Me in 2003 along with Brandon Pollack (ex One Man Army drummer), Chicken (who also plays in the band Western Addiction) and Ian Anderson. With the break-up of One Man Army, Dead To Me became Jack's main focus. But in the years following, Dalrymple would also join the veteran punk rock band Swingin' Utters in 2006 as their rhythm guitarist, start a new band with Utters' bassist Spike Slawson called The Re-Volts, and also toured with the punk rock band, U.S. Bombs. Jack left the band Dead To Me after their first 2 releases when his son was born to focus on work, family, and full-time commitment to the Swingin' Utters.

In 2012-13 Jack released a new EP with One Man Army on Adeline records called She's An Alarm. But shortly after, his long time friend and One Man Army bassist Heiko Schleprel died, and while there has been no official confirmation by the band as to their status, their lack of activity since has left their fans to believe that this means their final break up.

On top of recording and touring with his other bands Swingin' Utters and The Re-Volts, Jack started a new band called toyGuitar. The first 7" toyGuitar recorded for Adeline Records featured his One Man Army bandmate, Brandon, and Miles Peck(The Sore Thumbs) from Swingin' Utters. The current lineup features Rosie Gonce on drums and Paul Oxborrow on bass and they have recorded a full-length album for Fat Wreck Chords entitled "In This Mess" (2015) as well as a 5-song EP titled "Move Like A Ghost" (2016).

Around the time that toyGuitar was taking off it was announced by Dead To Me that Jack would be re-joining the band, and they are due to release their first record together after an 8-year hiatus in the fall of 2016. This reunion means Jack is now active in Swingin' Utters, Dead To Me, toyGuitar and The Re-Volts.

== Discography ==
One Man Army

Albums (LPs):

- Dead End Stories (1998, Adeline Records)
- Last Word Spoken (2000, Adeline Records)
- Rumors and Headlines (2002, BYO Records)

EPs:

- Shooting Blanks EP
- Bootlegger's Son EP, TKO Records
- Fat Club 7" (2001, Fat Wreck Chords)
- BYO Split Series, Vol. 5 (split with Alkaline Trio), (2004, BYO Recordss)
- She's An Alarm, (2012, Adeline Records)

Dead To Me

Albums (LPs):

- Cuban Ballerina (2006, Fat Wreck Chords)

EPs:

- Little Brother (2008, Fat Wreck Chords)
- I Wanna Die in Los Angeles (2016, Fat Wreck Chords)

Swingin' Utters

- Here, Under Protest (2011, Fat Wreck Chords)
- Poorly Formed (2013, Fat Wreck Chords)
- Fistful Of Hollow (2014, Fat Wreck Chords)
- Peace and Love (Swingin' Utters album) (2018, Fat Wreck Chords)

Re-Volts

EPs:

- Re-Volts (2013, Pirates Press Records)

toyGuitar

Albums (LPs):

- In This Mess (2015, Fat Wreck Chords)

EPs:

- toyGuitar (2014, Adeline Records)
- Move Like a Ghost (2016, Fat Wreck Chords)

== Videography ==
- Special Professional (Dead to Me)
- Greener Grass (Swingin Utters)
- Human Hyenas (toyGuitar)
- Punks in Vegas Sessions (toyGuitar)
