= Broadway Calls =

American punk rock band

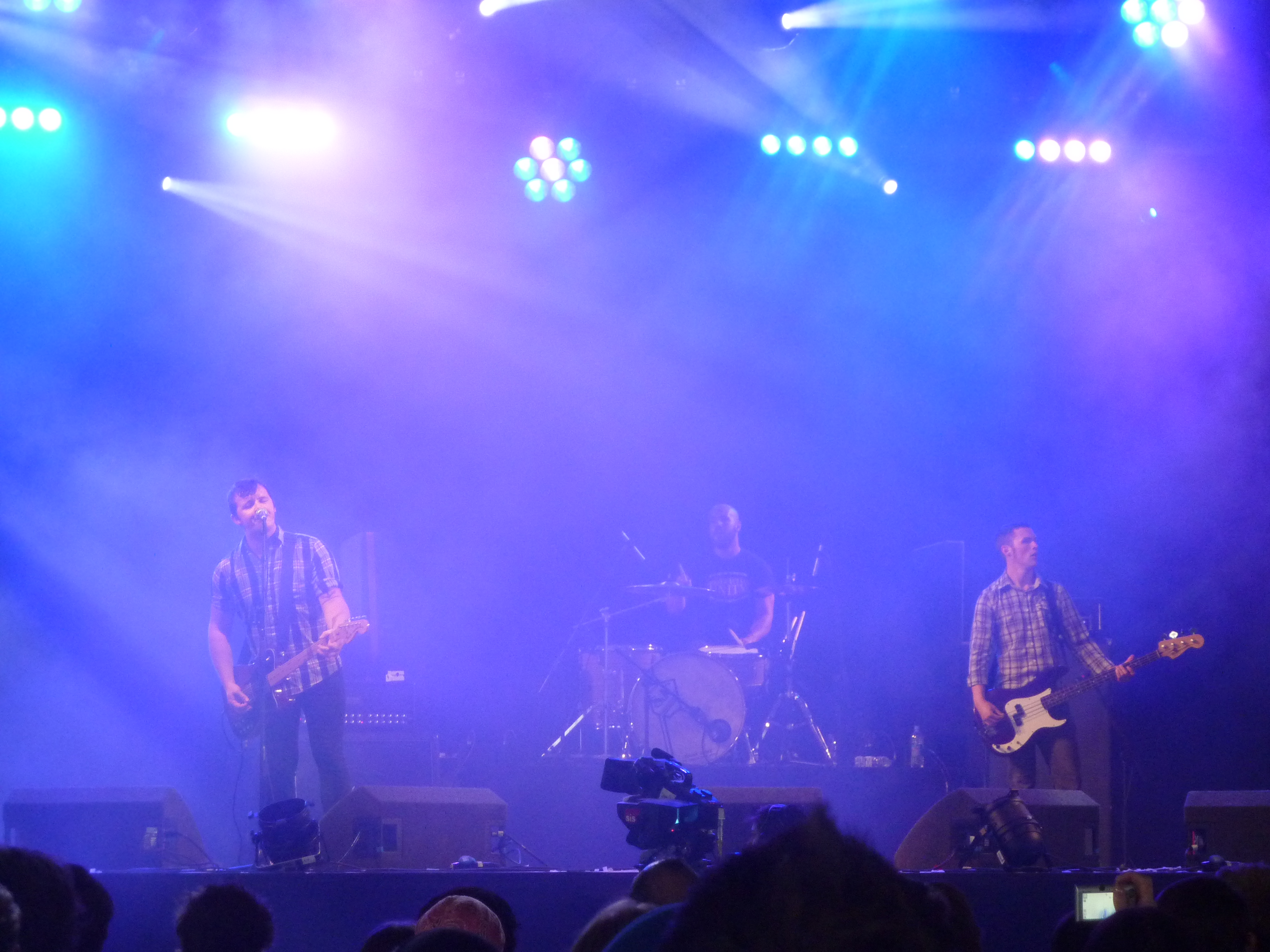
- Broadway Calls in 2009

Background information
- Origin: Rainier, Oregon, U.S.
- Genres: Pop punk, punk rock
- Years active: 2005–present
- Labels: No Sleep, SideOneDummy, Adeline, Smallman, Red Scare
- Members: Ty Vaughn; Josh Baird; Adam Willis
- Past members: Matt Koenig; Robbie Baird; Chris Spencer
- Website: www.myspace.com/broadwaycalls

Broadway Calls is an American punk rock band from Rainier, Oregon. The band has released four records and toured the United States and Canada extensively and often. More recently the band has completed tours in Europe. Broadway Calls have toured with such bands as Alkaline Trio, The Gaslight Anthem, Rancid, The Bouncing Souls, and Bad Religion.

== The Beginning (2005–2006) ==
Broadway Calls formed in the winter of 2005/2006, with Ty Vaughn (guitar and vocals), Matt Koenig (bass and vocals) Robert Baird (guitar) and Josh Baird (drums). The band was built on the solid foundation of Josh, Robert, and Ty's decade long history of making music together. Their previous band Countdown To Life was signed to New Age Records (Strife, Countervail, Lifetime). After playing one hometown show, Broadway Calls took a sink-or-swim approach and headed straight out on tour with label-mate Daggermouth. The tour was a great success and Broadway Calls made a name for themselves in the hardcore community. In late 2005, the band released its debut EP, Call the Medic, on the State of Mind label. In July and August 2006, they embarked on a US tour with Set It Straight.

== Self Titled Album (2007–2008) ==
Still signed to State of Mind Records in the US, and expanding their distribution potential by signing to Smallman Records in Canada, Broadway Calls released their self-titled album Broadway Calls and produced by Willie Samuels of Green Day's production team at Pittsburg's Nu-Tone studios. Broadway Calls was released on July 10, 2007; it was promoted with a West Coast US tour. Between September and November 2007, the band toured across the US with Death Is Not Glamorous and the Riot Before. Halfway through the tour, the band sold a split single with the Riot Before. They opened 2008 with a month-long cross-country US tour with Ruiner. In January 2008, the band announced they had signed to Adeline Records, who re-released their self-titled album in March 2008.

Halfway through the tour with Ruiner, Robbert Baird left the band to help support his new baby daughter. In March and April 2008, the band toured the US with Teenage Bottlerocket. During this, a music video was released for "Call It Off", which was directe by Jeff Altrock and filmed in Redding, California.

During April 2008, the band performed at Bamboozle Left, the annual two-day music festival held in California on April 5 with bands such as Jimmy Eat World, Alkaline Trio and Hot Water Music.

Shortly after the re-release of the album, in May 2008 the band played its first gig in England at the Give It A Name Festival 2008, on the Second Stage on Saturday May 10, 2008 at Earl's Court in London. They were the first band to perform that day and did so in front of 5,000 people. This was followed by performing the day after in Sheffield. Following this festival, the band went on a UK tour in support of Cobra Starship and All Time Low.

June 2008 started with three shows on the west coast of the U.S. with Alkaline Trio and then Warped Tour 2008 until August 2008. During the middle of the Warped Tour, the band released a split 7-inch with Teenage Bottlerocket on Adeline Records on July 15, 2008. This release was available in five different colour schemes.

During a break following Warped Tour, the band shot a music video for the second single from their debut album, Back To Oregon. The band returned to performing, coming back in September 2008 to play some shows with the Canadian band The Flatliners. In October 2008, the band went on a tour of the US with Crime in Stereo and Polar Bear Club, which included an appearance at The Fest in Florida. Following this, they played a handful of shows with Smartbomb. The band finished out the year by playing their final show in L.A, opening for The Gaslight Anthem and Alkaline Trio.

(Above Information under "Self-titled" section as per Blog by TY (Band member) on band's official Myspace – )

== Good Views, Bad News (2009–2010) ==
Following the conclusion of their touring in 2008, the band went back home, to write and record their follow up album. The band also booked and performed on a European Tour with Alkaline Trio in early 2009, starting on January 22, 2009, and ending on the February 17, 2009. The tour covered shows in Belgium, Germany, the Netherlands, Austria, Italy, Switzerland, France and ending in an 11 date tour in England. Shortly before the European Tour, the band announced via myspace on January 6, 2009, that they had signed with Sideone Dummy Records for their next album release. The music video for "Back to Oregon" was posted online on February 14, 2009.

Once the band came home from the European Tour with Alkaline Trio, the band set about tackling their next album. Starting on Tuesday March 10, they headed to Ft. Collins, Colorado, to record in the "Blasting Room!!", armed with close to 20 songs. There they would record their second album with producer Bill Stevenson, the drummer for Descendents and Only Crime. Bill Stevenson's production credits include records with bands like NOFX, Good Riddance, Rise Against, Comeback Kid, Suicide Machines, Descendents, A Wilhelm Scream, MxPx, Lagwagon, The Ataris, Black Flag, and many more. Pre-production was completed by March 15, which whittled the number of songs down to 13. Tracking began on March 15 with Bill and Jason Livermore. The band had finished recording and mixing the album by April 8. The band then performed some tour dates with Menzingers.

On May 14, 2009, Sideone Dummy Records revealed the name of the band's second album to be Good Views, Bad News, to be released August 18, 2009. On June 1, 2009, Sideone Dummy announced the release of the album's first single, "Be All That You Can't Be" on July 21, 2009. The single was available on 7" vinyl, available in Blue, Orange and White(Hot Topic Exclusive). The pressings of each colour was limited to 500 each. On June 10, 2009, the band announced that "Be All That You Can't Be" was to be included on the Warped Tour 2009 Tour Compilation CD. Good Views, Bad News reached No. 24 on the Billboard Heatseekers chart.

More recently the band has announced single shows with Bane and This Is Hell on July 27 and Comadre, Dead To Me, Hour of the Wolf on August 8. These shows are to be warm up shows ready for the band to perform on 5 dates on the 2009 Warped Tour on the Kia/Kevin Says Stage. Broadway Calls is scheduled to perform at the Leeds Festival in England on August 29, and at the Reading Festival on August 30. These festival dates line between dates supporting The Offspring on August 25 and 26 in London and Manchester, England and September 1 and 2 at shows in Munich, Germany and Milan, Italy.

More recently Sideone Dummy have announced the band is to support Streetlight Manifesto on a U.S. tour during late September and early October, followed up by 3 dates supporting The Gaslight Anthem during mid October 9.

In late July 2009, two additional songs were made available from the new album, for free download. "The Call Out" is available from NME website. "Jump at Shadows", is available, from a promotion with UK based "Kerrang!".

On August 6, 2009, the music video for "Be All That You Can't Be" debuted on Absolute Punk. In late August 2009, the Bouncing Souls announced that Broadway Calls would be supporting them alongside Bayside on a tour across the West Coast of the U.S. during late October and early November 2009.

During April and May 2010 the band toured the east coast and midwest of the U.S. with Cobra Skulls, The Flatliners and Off With Their Heads, amongst other bands.

The 2nd music video for the album was made for "Basement Royalty", and was released on May 13, 2010. It was made up of a collection of live performances when the band performed at Banquet Records in the UK in early 2010, and clips of the band members exploring the UK.

Matt Koenig left the band in early June 2010, due to alleged lack of song writing contribution towards the band's third album, which they had planned to start writing for following the end of their tour in early 2010. Koenig has been replaced by Adam Willis, who previously played with Josh Baird & Ty Vaughn in Countdown to Life. The band is currently writing for their third album.

Screamo band Comadre released their 4th Mix tape on October 1, 2010, which includes a collaboration with Broadway Calls.

== Toxic Kids EP and Sad in the City (2011–present) ==
The Toxic Kids EP was recorded at The Atomic Garden studio in San Francisco, which is owned by Jack Shirley of the band Comadre. The EP was released October 2011. On September 15, 2011, it was announced through Facebook that the Toxic Kids EP would be released on vinyl and in 4 colours. All for Hope Records handled the release in the US and Banquet Records in the UK. The EP consists of 6 tracks. The first track to be released was "Horizons And Histories".

On February 11, 2013, the band held an album-release concert in Portland, OR, for Comfort/Distraction.

On July 20, 2020, the band released the album Sad in the City by Red Scare Industries.

== Band members ==
- Ty Vaughn – guitar, vocals
- Adam Willis – bass guitar
- Josh Baird – drums

== Former members ==
- Robbie Baird – guitar
- Chris Spencer – guitar
- Matt Koenig – bass guitar, backing vocals

== Discography ==
=== Albums ===
- Broadway Calls (2007), (Smallman/State of Mind Records)
- Good Views, Bad News (2009), (Side One Dummy Records)
- Comfort/Distraction (2013), (No Sleep Records)
- Sad in the City (2020), (Red Scare Industries)

=== EPs ===
- Call the Medic (2006), (State of Mind Records)
- Toxic Kids (2011), (All For Hope Records (U.S)/Banquet Records (UK))
- Coming After You! (2024), (Red Scare Industries)

=== Splits ===
- The Riot Before/Broadway Calls Split (2007) (Say-10)
- Broadway Calls/Teenage Bottlerocket Split (2008), (Adeline Records)
- Vision Quest with Mixtapes (2012) (No Sleep Records)

=== Singles ===
| Year | Title | Chart Positions | | | Album |
| Year | Title | US Mod Rock | US Main Rock | UK Singles Chart | Album |
|---|---|---|---|---|---|
| 2008 | "Call It Off" | - | - | - | Broadway Calls |
| 2008 | "Back To Oregon" | - | - | - | Broadway Calls |
| 2009 | "Be All That You Can't Be" | - | - | - | Good Views, Bad News |
| 2010 | "Midnight Hour" | - | - | - | Good Views, Bad News |

=== Music videos ===
| Year | Title | Director |
|---|---|---|
| 2008 | "Call It Off" | Jeff Altrock |
| 2008 | "Back To Oregon" | Josh Landan |
| 2009 | "Be All That You Can't Be" | Josh Landan |
| 2010 | "Basement Royalty" | |
