= Fistful of Hollow =

Studio album by Swingin' Utters
- Released: November 11, 2014
- Genre: Punk rock, folk punk
- Length: 34:07
- Label: Fat Wreck Chords 932-2 (CD and LP)
- Producer: Jamie McMann, Swingin' Utters

Swingin' Utters chronology
Poorly Formed (2013)	Fistful of Hollow (2014)	Drowning in the Sea, Rising with the Sun (2017)

Professional ratings
Review scores
Source	Rating
Punknews.org	4/5 stars

Fistful of Hollow is the ninth full-length album by Californian punk rock band Swingin' Utters. The title and cover of the album are references to Hatful of Hollow, by The Smiths.

== Track listing ==
All tracks are written by Darius Koski, except where noted.

No.	Title	Length
1.	"Alice" (Johnny "Peebucks" Bonnel, Steve Bonnel, Miles Peck)	2:13
2.	"Fistful of Hollow"	1:38
3.	"Tell Them Told You So" (J. Bonnel, S. Bonnel, Jack Dalrymple)	2:32
4.	"From the Towers to the Tenements" (D. Koski, Aust Koski)	2:14
5.	"Napalm South" (J. Bonnel, S. Bonnel, Peck)	2:16
6.	"More or Less Moral"	1:54
7.	"I'm Not Coming Home"	1:53
8.	"Spanish"	2:57
9.	"Tibetan Book of the Damned" (J. Bonnel, S. Bonnel, Peck)	2:29
10.	"Agonist"	1:17
11.	"We Are Your Garbage" (J. Bonnel, S. Bonnel, Dalrymple)	2:09
12.	"Tonight's Moons" (J. Bonnel, S. Bonnel, Dalrymple)	2:17
13.	"No Talking"	2:03
14.	"Unaffected"	2:44
15.	"End of the Weak" (J. Bonnel, S. Bonnel, Peck)	3:31

== Personnel ==
- Johnny Bonnel (vocals)
- Darius Koski (guitar, vocals)
- Jack Dalrymple (guitar, vocals)
- Greg McEntee (drums)
- Miles Peck (bass, vocals)
