= Poorly Formed =

Studio album by Swingin' Utters
- Released: February 19, 2013
- Genre: Punk rock, folk punk
- Length: 29:18
- Label: Fat Wreck Chords 901-2 (CD and LP)
- Producer: Jamie McMann, Swingin' Utters

Swingin' Utters chronology
Here, Under Protest (2011)	Poorly Formed (2013)	Fistful of Hollow (2014)

Poorly Formed is the eighth full-length album by Californian punk rock band Swingin' Utters.

== Track listing ==
No.	Title	Length
1.	"The Librarians Are Hiding Something"	1:59
2.	"Brains"	2:55
3.	"Stuck in a Circle"	2:14
4.	"Pour Beans"	1:22
5.	"I'm a Little Bit Country"	2:30
6.	"In a Video"	1:41
7.	"Poorly Formed"	2:34
8.	"Greener Grass"	2:33
9.	"Temporary Contemporary"	1:54
10.	"A Walk with the Postman"	1:57
11.	"Military Barbara Billingsley"	2:02
12.	"Dreadlock Dread Reggae"	1:17
13.	"The Fake Rat of Dave Navarro"	2:08
14.	"Sevita Sing"	2:12

== Personnel ==
- Johnny Bonnel (vocals)
- Darius Koski (guitar, vocals)
- Jack Dalrymple (guitar, vocals)
- Greg McEntee (drums)
- Miles Peck (bass, vocals)
