= The Sounds Wrong EP =

EP by Swingin' Utters
- Released: 1995
- Recorded: January 1995
- Genre: Punk rock
- Label: IFA Records, Fat Wreck Chords

Swingin' Utters chronology
| The Streets of San Francisco (1995) | The Sounds Wrong EP (1995) | More Scared: The House of Faith Years (1996) |

The Sounds Wrong EP is the second EP by Californian punk rock band Swingin' Utters, released in 1995.

== Track listing ==
All tracks are written by Swingin Utters.

| No. | Title | Length |
|---|---|---|
| 1. | "The Dirty Sea" | 3:03 |
| 2. | "Stupid Lullabies" | 2:18 |
| 3. | "L.O.V.E. I Hate You" | 2:30 |
| 4. | "Gregs Love Song" | 2:57 |
| 5. | "Sounds Wrong & Devious Means" | 3:24 |
| Total length: | | 14:12 |

- The EP's final track is in fact two separate songs, with Sounds Wrong finishing and Devious Means starting at 1:14.

== Personnel ==
- Johnny "Peebucks" Bonnel (vocals)
- Greg McEntee (drums)
- Darius Koski (guitar)
- Kevin Wickersham (bass)
- Max Huber (guitar)

== In other media ==
"Stupid Lullabies" appears in Dave Mirra Freestyle BMX as part of an in-game soundtrack.
