= Five Lessons Learned =

Studio album by Swingin' Utters
- Released: June 23, 1998
- Recorded: Winter of 1997–98, at Motor Studios, San Francisco, California
- Genre: Punk rock
- Length: 38:07
- Label: Fat Wreck Chords
- Producer: Fat Mike, Ryan Greene, Swingin' Utters

Swingin' Utters chronology
A Juvenile Product of the Working Class (1996)	Five Lessons Learned (1998)	Brazen Head E.P. (1999)

Professional ratings
Review scores
Source	Rating
Allmusic	4/5 stars

Five Lessons Learned is the fourth full-length album by American punk rock band Swingin' Utters. Released in 1998, it was their second album on Fat Wreck Chords.

== Background ==
This album's title track was used on the video game Tony Hawk's Pro Skater 2, perhaps making it the band's most widely heard song. "I Need Feedback", however, was the only single released from this album. Also, the song "This Bastard's Life" is featured in music video game Rock Band 3.

The Track "Tell Me Lies" was also featured in a VHS BMX Video called "Dig" Featuring Tim "Fuzzy" Hall and TJ Lavin. The track is played during a Backyard Dirt Session.

Five Lessons Learned is mainly an album of short, fast songs in the 'punk revival' style - "I Need Feedback" borrows a riff from The Damned's "Neat Neat Neat" - but there is also a ska-esque song ("Unpopular Again"), and an Irish folk-style song ("Fruitless Fortunes"), hinting at the band's future direction, and that of the side-project, the Filthy Thievin' Bastards.

The outer and inner cover art is by photographer Steve Zeigler and features black-and-white shots involving guns, crime and murder scenes (in one picture, the date "2-14-47" is etched in chalk).

The presence of the head of the Fat Wreck Chords label, NOFX's Fat Mike, is felt in that he co-produces and plays bass guitar on "Unpopular Again". Another of the many guest musicians is Chris Shiflett, later of Foo Fighters.

== Track listing ==
1. "Five Lessons Learned" (Koski/Aust Koski) – 1:55
2. "Tell Me Lies" (Huber) – 2:09
3. "A Promise to Distinction" (Koski) – 2:08
4. "The Stooge" (Koski) – 3:27
5. "(The) Picture's Perfect" (Huber) – 2:37
6. "This Bastard's Life" (Huber) – 3:05
7. "As You Start Leaving" (Koski) – 2:44
8. "I Need Feedback" (Huber) – 3:27
9. "Good People" (Koski) – 2:18
10. "As Sure as I'm down" (Bonnel) – 2:01
11. "Untitled 21" (Huber) – 2:36
12. "Unpopular Again" (Huber) – 3:16
13. "New Day Rising" (Koski) – 1:49
14. "Two Jacks Shitty" (Bonnel) – 1:43
15. "Fruitless Fortunes" (Koski) – 2:52

== Personnel ==
- Johnny Bonnel (vocals)
- Max Huber (guitars, vocals, bass on track #8, percussion)
- Greg McEntee (drums and percussion)
- Darius Koski (guitar, vocals, accordion, violin, bass on tracks #1, #4 & #5)

=== Additional musicians ===
- John Maurer (bass on tracks #2, #3, #6, #7, #9, #10, #13 & #14)
- Howie Pyro (bass on track #11)
- Fat Mike (bass on track #12)
- Rockin Lloyd Tripp (upright bass on track #15)
- Seth Lorenzi (Hammond and Vox organs, electric piano)
- Max Butler (mandolin)
- Chris Shiflett (lead guitar on tracks #8 and #11)
- Ryan Greene (tambourine on track #12)
- Spike Slawson (backup vocals on tracks #5 and #8)
- Morty Okin (trumpet)
- Van Hughes (trombone)
- David Murotake (tenor saxophone)
- Tom Griesser (baritone saxophone)
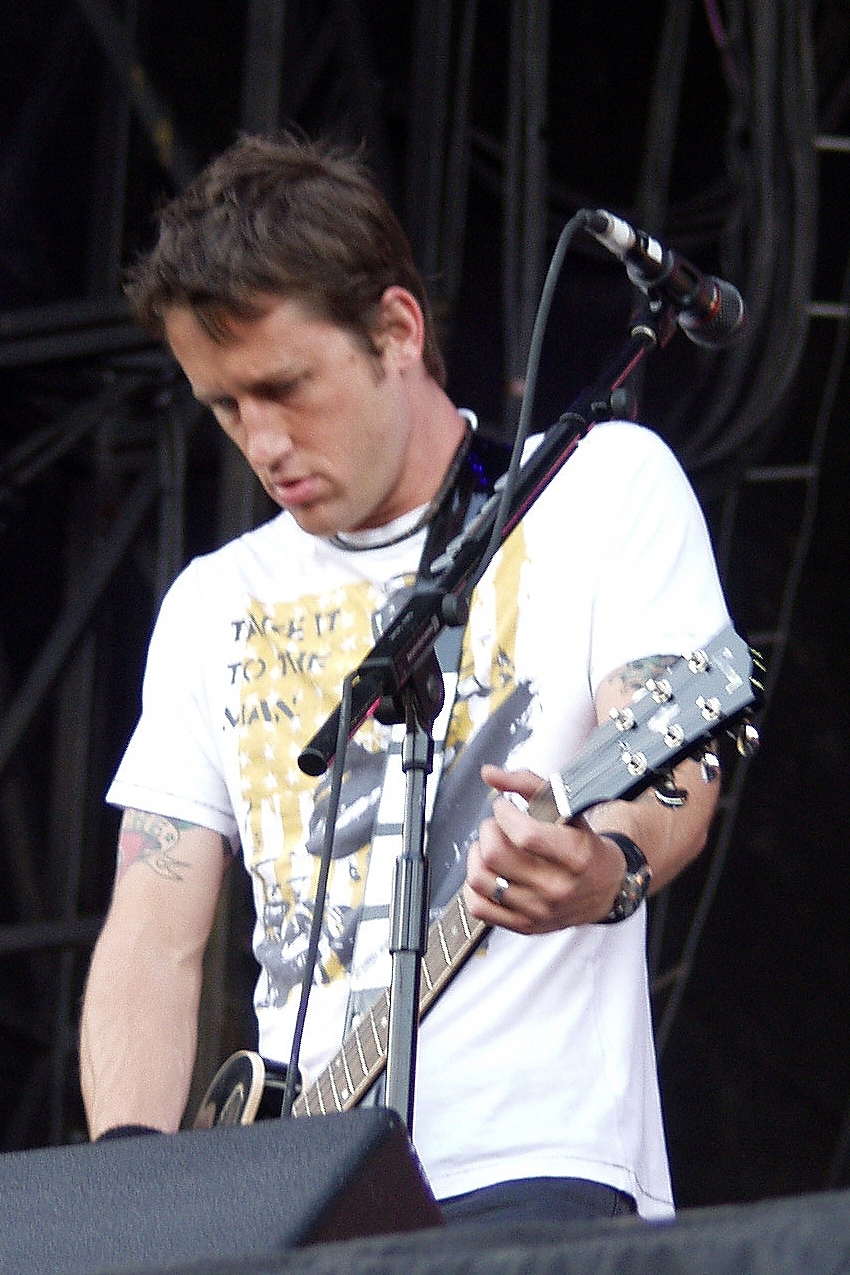
Chris Shiflett (who appears on two tracks); seen here as a member of Foo Fighters

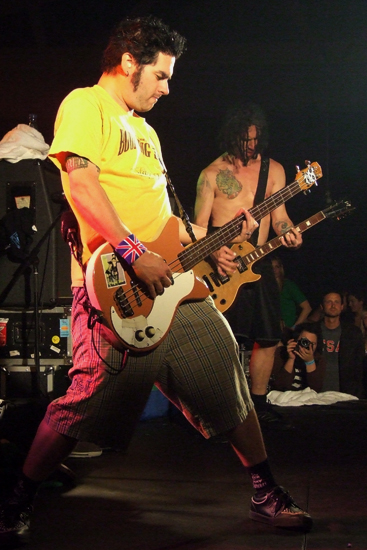
Fat Mike
