= Toxic Kids =

EP by Broadway Calls
- Released: 19 September 2011
- Recorded: Jan–July 2011 at Atomic Garden Studio, Palo Alto
- Genre: Punk rock, pop-punk
- Length: 17:50
- Label: All For Hope Records (U.S), Banquet Records (U.K)
- Producer: Jack Shirley

Broadway Calls chronology
Call the Medic (2006)	Toxic Kids (2011)

Toxic Kids is the second EP from Broadway Calls'. It was released digitally on 19 September 2011, with a physical release on vinyl following in mid October 2011. This will precede the release of the band's third album, most likely to see a 2012 release.

The EP has been released on 12" vinyl, available in 4 colours – Blue (from Banquet Records), Black, Highlighter Yellow and Red. The red and highlighter yellow colours are limited to 200 copies each, the black limited to 600 copies, and the blue variant limited to 300 copies.

== Track listing ==
All tracks are written by Broadway Calls.

Side A:
No.	Title	Length
1.	"I'm So Ready To Be Done with My 20's"	2:36
2.	"I Never Made The Team"	3:27
3.	"Denver"	3:36
4.	"Toxic Kids"	3:18
5.	"Horizons And Histories"	3:06
6.	"Stealing Sailboats"	1:47
Total length:		17:50

== Personnel ==
- Ty Vaughn – guitar, vocals
- Adam Willis – bass guitar, vocals
- Josh Baird – drums

== Writing and recording ==
During early 2011, the band had been in studio at The Atomic Garden studio in Palo Alto, which is owned by Jack Shirley of the band Comadre, writing for their third album. They had around 15 songs in June, with at least 4–5 as work-in-progress.

On 15 September 2011, it was announced through Facebook that the New EP would be released in mid to late October 2011, on vinyl. All For Hope Records were announced as handling the release in the US and Banquet Records in the UK. The first track to be released is available to listen to at punknews.org, called "Horizons And Histories".

== Vinyl release ==
Blue	Yellow	Red	Black
Banquet Records	All For Hope Records		
300 Copies	200 Copies	200 Copies	600 Copies
