= Live in a Dive (Swingin' Utters album) =

Live album by Swingin' Utters
- Released: June 29, 2004
- Recorded: May 25, 2003
- Venues: The Troubadour, Los Angeles
- Genres: Punk rock; Folk rock
- Length: 63:14 (CD version)
- Label: Fat Wreck Chords 669
- Producer: Ryan Greene

Swingin' Utters chronology
Dead Flowers, Bottles, Bluegrass, and Bones (2003)	Live in a Dive (2004)	Hatest Grits: B-Sides and Bullshit (2008)

Live in a Dive chronology
Subhumans (2004)	Swingin' Utters (2004)	Lagwagon (2005)

Professional ratings
Review scores
Source	Rating
AllMusic	4/5 stars
IGN	8/10 stars

Live in a Dive is a live album by Californian punk rock band Swingin' Utters, released by Fat Wreck Chords on June 29, 2004, as a 23-track CD and a double LP. It is the sixth release in the label's Live in a Dive series.

The album was recorded at The Troubadour in Los Angeles. The band plays 23 songs in about an hour, drawn from nearly its entire catalog up to Dead Flowers, Bottles, Bluegrass, and Bones. The set also includes several acoustic songs and stage banter between tracks. As with other entries in the series, the liner notes take the form of a comic book, in this case a Scooby-Doo style mystery starring the band.

== Critical reception ==
Punktastic called it "another great addition to the series" and praised the band's live sound and song selection. IGN rated the album 8 out of 10.

== Personnel ==
- Johnny Bonnel – vocals
- Darius Koski – guitar, vocals, accordion
- Greg McEntee – drums
- Spike Slawson – bass, vocals
- Chuck Worthy – guitar
- Ryan Greene – recording, mixing

== Track listing ==
All songs written by Swingin' Utters unless stated. The vinyl edition is a double LP with two songs not on the 23-track CD.

Side A
No.	Title	Length
1.	"Don't Ask Why"	2:26
2.	"Pills & Smoke"	2:42
3.	"Five Lessons Learned"	1:54
4.	"Jackie Jab"	2:10
5.	"Nowhere Fast"	2:01
6.	"Glad"	2:10
7.	"Tied Down, Spit On"	1:18
8.	"Hopeless Vows"	2:17

Side B
No.	Title	Length
1.	"Fruitless Fortunes"	3:54
2.	"All That I Can Give"	2:42
3.	"Windspitting Punk"	2:15
4.	"Tell Me Lies" (vinyl only)
5.	"The Courage of a Younger Pope"	2:46
6.	"Sign in a Window" (vinyl only)

Side C
No.	Title	Writer(s)	Length
1.	"No Eager Men"		3:07
2.	"15th and T"		2:02
3.	"Teenage Genocide"		2:05
4.	"I Got Your Number"	Beaufoy, Bruce, Burgess, McFaull	2:33
5.	"Mother of the Mad"		2:20
6.	"London Drunk"		3:32

Side D
No.	Title	Writer(s)	Length
1.	"Expletive Deleted"		4:13
2.	"The Next in Line"		3:46
3.	"The Dirty Sea"		3:06
4.	"Here We Are Nowhere"	Cluney	0:56
5.	"Catastrophe"		6:59
