= No Eager Men =

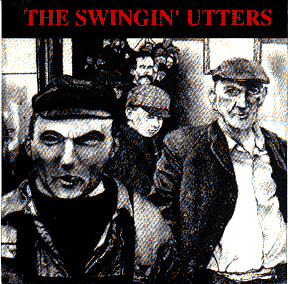

Studio album 7" by Swingin' Utters
- Released: 1993
- Genre: Punk rock
- Label: Quality of Life, Inc.

Swingin' Utters chronology
Scared (1992)	No Eager Men (1993)	The Streets of San Francisco (1995)

"No Eager Men" was the second 7" by Californian punk rock band Swingin' Utters, released in 1993.

- The cover calls the band "the Swingin' Utters" for the first time, thus losing the Johnny Peebucks moniker.
- Originally released as a 7" record, two of these songs would be re-recorded for The Streets of San Francisco.
- The song "Here We Are Nowhere" is a cover, originally done by Stiff Little Fingers.

== Track listing ==
1. "No Eager Men"
2. "Here We Are Nowhere"
3. "Petty Wage"
4. "Hello Charlatan"

== Personnel ==
- Johnny Bonnel (vocals)
- Greg McEntee (drums)
- Darius Koski (guitar)
- Kevin Wickersham (bass)
- Max Huber (guitar)
