= Frail Bray =

Studio album by Western Addiction
- Released: May 15, 2020
- Recorded: late 2019
- Studio: The Atomic Garden
- Genre: Punk rock, hardcore punk
- Length: 27:53
- Label: Fat Wreck Chords
- Producer: Jack Shirley

Western Addiction chronology
| Tremulous (2017) | Frail Bray (2020) | Psychedelic Munitions (2026) |

Professional ratings
Review scores
| Source | Rating |
|---|---|
| Punk Rock Theory | 8/10 stars |
| Scene Point Blank | 8/10 stars |
| Vladkraykulla-webzine | 8/10 stars |
| Brokenheadphones.com | (positive) |
| York Calling | (positive) |

Frail Bray is the third studio album by the San Francisco based punk rock band Western Addiction. The album was released by Fat Wreck Chords on May 15, 2020. It was recorded in late 2019 and produced by Jack Shirley, who also produced albums for Jeff Rosenstock, Deafheaven and Joyce Manor.

Frail Bray features guest appearances by Darius Koski from Swingin' Utters and Brenna Red from The Last Gang. It is the first album by Western Addiction with the bass guitarist Mitch Paglia.

== Background ==
The album was announced by Fat Wreck Chords first officially on March 17. A song was released, "They Burned Our Paintings". On April 20, a new song was released, called "Lurchers". A music video for "They Burned Our Paintings" was released on May 6 and the full album was made available for streaming on May 13. The album was officially released two days later, on May 15. A music video for the title track, "Frail Bray", was released on July 22.

== Track listing ==
1. "The Leopard and the Juniper" - 2:00
2. "They Burned Our Paintings" - 2:29
3. "Frail Bray" - 2:28
4. "Lurchers" - 1:51
5. "Rose's Hammer I" - 1:32
6. "Rose's Hammer II" - 3:24
7. "Laurette" - 1:26
8. "Utter Despair" - 2:43
9. "Wildflowers of Italy" - 3:56
10. "We Lived in Ultraviolet" - 2:43
11. "Deranged by Grief" - 3:21

== Performers ==
Western Addiction

- Mitch Paglia - bass, backing vocals
- Chad Williams - drums
- Ken Yamazaki - guitar, backing vocals
- Jason Hall - vocals
- Tony Teixeira - guitar, piano, backing vocals, synthesizer

Additional performers

- Darius Koski - vocals (track 9), violin, viola, piano, tambourine
- Brenna Red - vocals (tracks 1, 3 and 6)
