= Dead Flowers, Bottles, Bluegrass, and Bones =

Studio album by Swingin' Utters
- Released: February 25, 2003
- Recorded: Stout Recording, Oakland, California, April, May, June and August 2002
- Genre: Punk rock; folk punk
- Length: 35:47
- Label: Fat Wreck Chords 648 (CD and LP)
- Producer: The Greedy Bros.

Swingin' Utters chronology
Swingin' Utters (2000)	Dead Flowers, Bottles, Bluegrass, and Bones (2003)	Live in a Dive (2004)

Dead Flowers, Bottles, Bluegrass and Bones is the sixth full-length album by American punk rock band Swingin' Utters.

== Background ==
Alongside the band's usual punk style of music, there is a strong presence of Pogues-influenced Irish folk on this album, perhaps even more heavily than on the band's previous album. The Swingin' Utters recorded Live in a Dive shortly after this album was released.

== Reception ==
Professional ratings
Review scores
Source	Rating
Allmusic	4.5/5 stars
Free Lance-Star	favorable

The Free Lance-Star gave the album a positive review, while Allmusic gave it a four and a half stars out of five rating, with reviewer Jo-Ann Greene calling it "a stomping mix of rabid punk and pub-crunching singalongs" and "the best yet from the band".

== Track listing ==
All tracks written by Darius Koski except as noted.

1. "No Pariah" – 1:30
2. "Glad" – 2:09
3. "Hopeless Vows" – 1:48
4. "Dead Flowers, Bottles, Bluegrass and Bones" (Johnny Bonnel, Koski) – 2:05
5. "All That I Can Give" – 2:24
6. "Sign in a Window" – 1:54
7. "Dont Ask Why" – 2:12
8. "Lampshade" – 2:56
9. "Letters to Yourself" – 2:35
10. "Heaven at Seventeen" – 1:43
11. "Leaves of Fate" (Bonnel, Koski) – 1:57
12. "If You Want Me To" (Koski, Spike Slawson) – 2:46
13. "Elation" (Goddard, Koski) – 1:40
14. "Poor Me" (Aust Koski, Koski) – 1:44
15. "My Closed Mind" – 1:23
16. "Looking for Something to Follow" – 2:57
17. "Shadows and Lies" – 1:57

== Personnel ==
- Johnny Bonnel (vocals)
- Darius Koski (guitar, vocals, accordion, piano, organ, violin, viola)
- Greg McEntee (drums)
- Spike Slawson (bass, vocals)

Additional musicians

- Tom Brayton (percussion)
- mike busbee [sic] (vibraphone, bass on track #17, percussion)
