= Dead End Stories =

Studio album by One Man Army
- Released: September 29, 1998
- Genre: Punk rock
- Length: 36:31
- Label: Adeline
- Producer: Kevin Army; One Man Army

One Man Army chronology
Dead End Stories (1998)	Last Word Spoken (2000)

Dead End Stories is the debut album from punk rock band One Man Army, released in 1998 through Adeline Records. As of 2025, the album is not available on any streaming service and has been out of print for many years on CD and vinyl due to Adeline Records shutting down in 2017.

== Track listing ==
All tracks written by Jack Dalrymple and Brandon Pollack, except where noted.

1. "Another Dead End Story" - 2:38
2. "Money In the Bank" - 2:52
3. "They'll Never Call It Quits" - 3:19
4. "One In the Same" - 2:11
5. "Stuck In the Avenues" - 3:49
6. "Another Time" (Jack Dalrymple) - 3:36
7. "Fate At Fourteen" (Dalrymple) - 3:19
8. "Down the Block" (Dalrymple) - 2:53
9. "Big Time" - 3:05
10. "Three Strikes" (Dalrymple, Pollack, Romero) - 2:42
11. "Back Then" - 2:34
12. "Downtown Lights" (Bonus) - 3:33

== Personnel ==
One Man Army

- Jack Dalrymple – Vocals and guitars
- James Kotter – Bass
- Brandon Pollack – Drums and background vocals

Additional Personnel

- Kevin Army – Production, engineering
- Joe Gastwirt – Mastering
- Randy Burke – Drum tech
- Jef Whitehead – Cover painting
- Gabe Morford – Photos
- Aaron Hawkins – Back cover
- Jim Thiebaud & Jamie Reilly – Layout
