= Frozen Peas =

Audio clip featuring Orson Welles

Frozen Peas is the colloquial term for a blooper audio clip in which American actor and filmmaker Orson Welles performs narration for a series of British television advertisements for Findus. The clip is also known informally as In July, or Yes, Always, based on several of Welles's complaints during the recording.

== Background ==
The British Film Institute (BFI) database lists the titles "Findus: Lincolnshire (Peas)", "Findus: Sweden" and "Findus: Far West", all dated 1970, and attributed to the J. Walter Thompson advertising agency.

Jonathan Lynn, who acted in Welles's film of The Merchant of Venice made between 1969 and 1970, recalled being told about the recording session by Welles:

One night [Welles] told us about his voice over for Findus frozen peas. “An ad agency called and asked me to do a voice over. I said I would. Then they said would I please come in and audition. 'Audition?' I said. 'Surely to God there’s someone in your little agency who knows what my voice sounds like?' Well, they said they knew my voice but it was for the client. So I went in. I wanted the money, I was trying to finish Chimes at Midnight. I auditioned and they offered me the part! Well, they asked me to go to some little basement studio in Wardour Street to record it. I demanded payment in advance. After I'd gotten the cheque I told them 'I can’t come to Wardour Street next week, I have to be in Paris.' I told them to bring their little tape-recorder and meet me at the Georges Cinq Hotel next Wednesday at eleven am. So they flew over to Paris, came to the hotel at eleven – and were told that I had checked out the day before." He chortled happily. "I left them a message telling them to call me at the Gritti Palace in Venice. They did, and I told them to meet me there on Friday. When they got there I was gone – they found a message telling them to come to Vienna." Now he was laughing uproariously. "I made them chase me all around Europe with their shitty little tape recorder for ten days. They were sorry they made me audition."

It is therefore possible that Welles recorded the session in Vienna, during the making of the Vienna segment of his unfinished Orson's Bag TV special.

Lynn’s second-hand story may be a recollection from the initial recording session with perhaps the same client (the director was heard to refer to a previous successful session). Also, the outtakes give many clues that they took place in a professional recording studio and not a hotel using a portable recorder. This also would better explain the client-mandated audition.

The BFI database also lists four more 1970 Findus advertisements with place names: "France", "Highlands", "Normandy and "Shetland". These may be part of the same series, and possibly also voiced by Welles.

=== Bootleg circulation ===
The original recording was made in 1970. The outtake/blooper reel was presumably spliced to circulate as a bootleg recording, and nothing is known about who made it or their connection to Findus or J. Walter Thompson. The earliest record of the bootleg dates to 1979, when advertiser Peter Shillingford shared a copy with Welles, who enjoyed it.

It is not known whether a complete recording of the session exists (since, for example, the "multiple takes" Welles alludes to are not contained on the circulated recording, and the recording transitions between different commercials). It is also not known whether film copies of the final advertisements exist in the BFI National Archive.

== Summary ==
The recording begins with Welles reading the introduction to a script for a commercial for frozen peas.

"We know a remote farm in Lincolnshire, where Mrs. Buckley lives; every July, peas grow there..."

Welles breaks from the script, expressing his dissatisfaction about the timing of the piece, as well as remarking that "it's so nice that you see a snow-covered field and say, "Every July, peas grow there...we're talking about 'em growing and she's picked 'em."

A director requests that he emphasize the word 'in' in the phrase "in July;" Welles claims this is impossible to do in a sensible fashion, claiming that the director isn't thinking.

Why? That doesn't make any sense. Sorry. There's no known way of saying an English sentence in which you begin a sentence with 'in' and emphasize it. Get me a jury and show me how you can say "in July", and I'll go down on you. That's just idiotic, if you'll forgive me my saying so. That's just stupid, "in July"; I'd love to know how you emphasize 'in' in "In July"...impossible! Meaningless!

A director apologizes because the script actually said "Every July" rather than "in July", but Welles continues to complain that it was the other director ("your friend") who made the suggestion, and quips, "Too much directing around here."

From here, the recording transitions to a different commercial for fish fingers, apparently at either the same recording session, or for the same director:

"We know a certain fjord in Norway, near where the cod gather in great shoals. There, Jan St..."

Welles struggles with the pronunciation of the fisherman's name, cursing under his breath. The director requests a different pacing, but Welles refuses.

You don't know what I'm up against: because it's full of, of, of things that are only correct because they're grammatical but they're tough on the ear, you see; this is a very wearying one, it's unpleasant to read. Unrewarding.

Welles attempts to finish the script but gets tangled around the words "crumb-crisp coating." The directors permit him to remove the word "crumb."

The recording moves on to yet another advertisement, for hamburgers, but not before Welles slips in a complaint.

Here, under protest, is "beef burgers." "We know a little place in the American far west, where Charlie Briggs chops up the finest prairie-fed beef and tastes..." This is a lot of shit, you know that?

The directors ask for one more take, as they don't like the way he emphasizes "prairie-fed" over beef.

But you can't emphasize 'beef'; that's like his wanting me to emphasize 'in' before 'July'! Come on, fellas, you're losing your heads! I wouldn't direct any living actor like this in Shakespeare, the way you do this! It's impossible!

The directors try to calm him down, but Welles insists he's giving it the right reading, to which a director responds, "For the moment." Welles continues to gripe about the number of takes he's made for these commercials, which he claims is twenty more than any other he's made.

You're such pests...now, what is it you want? In your depths of your ignorance, what is it you want? Well, whatever it is you want, I can't deliver because I just don't see it.

When the engineer attempts to give Welles some pointers, the actor reveals his frustration of being a performer, a "hired hand" on the commercial being given conflicting advice from different people in the booth.

I take direction from one person...under protest, but from two I don't sit still.

The actual director continues to try to calm Welles down, but he storms out of the recording booth.

This isn't worth it, no money is worth it!

== Parodies ==
The tape has been parodied many times, often when parodying Welles himself. In the animated series Animaniacs, an episode featuring Pinky and the Brain titled "Yes, Always", featured a near-verbatim restaging (with vulgarities replaced by innocuous substitutes, e.g., "...and I'll make cheese for you" in place of "...and I'll go down on you"), with Brain playing the part of Welles and Pinky as the director. Brain's voice actor, Maurice LaMarche, well known for his Welles impressions, would sometimes parody the "frozen peas" tape before recording sessions as a warm up, and parts of these warmup lines were incorporated into the cartoon's script.

Another version portrayed in The Critic features Welles, again voiced by LaMarche, whispering "Rosebud" à la Citizen Kane before the shot pans out to reveal Welles at a table, with a plate of Rosebud Frozen Peas he is advertising. After reading his lines, describing the peas as "full of country goodness and green pea-ness," he becomes disgusted and walks off, taking a handful of peas with him and eating them alongside a French fry stuck in his beard. In another episode, Welles, upset over having to read a living will, begins endorsing for "Mrs. Pell's Fish Sticks" instead, eating them and declaring that "they're even better raw". He even appears later as a ghostly apparition to Margo Sherman to continue promoting and eating the fish sticks, declaring that "they're even better when you're dead".

Another parody of the tape appeared in a skit on the Canadian sketch comedy show SCTV, where Welles, played by John Candy, is hired by Liberace, played by Dave Thomas, for a Christmas storytelling. Welles is frequently distracted by the TV crew and finally, he gets up and walks off (taking an entire roast turkey with him). Amongst Welles's complaints in this scene are three direct quotes from the "Frozen Peas" recording: "You don't know what I'm up against," "I wouldn't direct any living actor like this in Shakespeare," and "No money is worth this!"

Yet another animated example, once more portrayed by LaMarche comes from the 2010 Futurama episode "Lrrreconcilable Ndndifferences" for which he won an Emmy Award. Welles (as a head in a jar) agrees to recreate his famous War of the Worlds broadcast for Lrrr, the Planet Express crew and a cheese log even when complaining on-air about obvious plot holes in the script.

The tape was referenced in the "Bishop" skit from Monty Python's Contractual Obligation Album, where it is mentioned that "Bath and Wells" is busy "doing frozen peas for Nigel."

Will Ferrell's bookend segments in the miniseries The Spoils of Babylon, as Eric Jonrosh (a Welles lookalike), feature Jonrosh breaking from the script frequently to complain of inane language and berate the unseen crew.

== Other media ==
The experimental music group Negativland incorporated "frozen peas" in its entirety in the track "Jolly Green Giant", a collage also featuring sound effects and other archival recordings of commercials in production phase. The track appears on their 1998 EP Happy Heroes.

California punk band Swingin' Utters released an album in 2011 entitled Here, Under Protest and opens with a clip of Welles saying, "Here, under protest, is beef burgers".
