= Wait for It =

Wait for It could refer to:

== Television ==
- "Wait for It" (How I Met Your Mother), an episode of the CBS sitcom How I Met Your Mother
  - "Wait for It", a catchphrase of Barney Stinson, a character in the show

== Songs ==
- "Wait for It" (song), a song from the musical Hamilton
- "Wait for It... Wait for It", a 2010 song by punk rock band Dead to Me
