= Jamie McMann =

- Born: July 20, 1976; Rochester, New York, U.S.
- Died: April 24, 2025 (aged 48)
- Occupation(s): Record producer, engineer, mixer, musician, programmer
- Instrument(s): Guitar, bass
- Years active: 2002–2025
- Labels: Fat Wreck Chords, Adeline, Epitaph, BYO, Myspace, Pirates Press
- Website: www.jamiemcmann.com

Jamie McMann (July 20, 1976 – April 24, 2025) was an American record producer, mixer, and audio engineer, once based in Rochester, New York, United States.

== Life and career ==
Jamie McMann produced recordings spanning multiple genres of music professionally since 2002 when he began working at San Francisco's historic Hyde Street Studios. After a four-year run with Hyde Street Studios, McMann moved on to produce a significant body of work out of Motor Studios, San Francisco, (owned by Fat Mike, bassist and frontman of the punk rock band NOFX). Utilizing a 64 channel SSL4000E (analog audio console), McMann shaped numerous productions that were released on Fat Mike's record label, Fat Wreck Chords. McMann had relocated to Los Angeles not long before his death, where he continued producing records for various artists and record labels. He died April 24, 2025, at the age of 48.

== Select discography ==
- Mandrake – The Shell Corporation (2014) Mixing
- Stuck in a Circle – Swingin' Utters (2013) Producer, engineer
- Panic State – D-Cent Jerks (2013) Producer, Mixing, engineer
- Poorly Formed – Swingin' Utters (2013) Engineer, producer
- Stoke Extinguisher – NOFX (2013) Engineer
- She's an Alarm – One Man Army (2012) Engineer, mixing
- Acoustic, Vol. 2 – Joey Cape, Tony Sly (2012) Engineer, mixing, producer
- Self Entitled – NOFX (2012) Engineer
- Time and Pressure – The Shell Corporation (2012) Producer, mixing, engineer
- The Decline, Live DVD – NOFX (2012) Mixer
- Rubber Bordello – Original Soundtrack (2012) Producer, engineer, mixing
- Agitations – Cobra Skulls (2011) Engineer, mixing, producer
- From the Dumpster to the Grave – Leftöver Crack (2011) Producer, engineer
- Force Majeure – The Shell Corporation (2011) Production, Mixing, engineer
- Go Down Under – Me First and the Gimme Gimmes (2011) Engineer, mixing, producer
- Here, Under Protest – Swingin' Utters (2011) Engineer, mixing, producer
- Sad Bear – Tony Sly (2011) Engineer, mixing, producer
- Bringing the War Home – Cobra Skulls (2010) Producer, engineer, mixing
- 12 Song Program – Tony Sly (2010) Engineer, mixing, producer
- Consentual Selections – Mad Caddies (2010) Engineer
- The Longest EP – NOFX (2010) Engineer, mixing
- African Elephants – Dead to Me (2009) Engineer, mixing
- Coaster – NOFX (2009) Engineer
- Cokie the Clown – NOFX (2009) Engineer, mixing
- Let Them Know: The Story of Youth Brigade & BYO Records (2009) Engineer
- Hatest Grits: B-Sides and Bullshit – Swingin' Utters (2008) Remixing
- Have Another Ball! – Me First and the Gimme Gimmes (2008) Remixing
- I Think My Older Brother Used to Listen to Lagwagon – Lagwagon (2008) Accordion (diatonic), engineer, mixing, producer
- Little Brother – Dead to Me (2008) Engineer, assistant producer
- Off the Leash – The Real McKenzies (2008) Engineer, mixing, producer
- Re-Volts – Re-Volts (2008) Mixing
- Remain in Memory: The Final Show – Good Riddance (2008) Engineer, producer
- Until We're Dead – Star Fucking Hipsters (2008) Engineer, mixing
- A Different Light – Sherwood (2007) Engineer, vocals
- Deadline – Leftöver Crack (2007) Engineer, mixing, producer
- They've Actually Gotten Worse Live – NOFX (2007) Engineer, mixing
- I Remember When I Was Pretty – The Playing Favorites (2007) Engineer
- Hasta La Muerte! – La Plebe (2006) Engineer, mixing
- Love Their Country – Me First and the Gimme Gimmes (2006) Engineer
- My Republic – Good Riddance (2006) Engineer
- Seize the Time! – Flattbush (2006) Engineer
- Twelve Small Steps, One Giant Disappointment – Bad Astronaut (2006) Additional mixing
- Wolves in Wolves' Clothing – NOFX (2006) Additional engineer
- Thrasher Mag: Skate Rock, Vol. 12: Eat the Flag – various artists (2005) Engineer, mixing

== Other sources ==
- 2014: Discogs.
- 1997–2014: Barnesandnoble.com LLC.
- 1997–2014: Rogue Digital, LLC.
- 2012: Snakeoil Media Productions, LLC.
