= Swingin' Utters (album) =

Studio album by Swingin' Utters
- Released: October 10, 2000
- Recorded: April–May 2000 at Motor Studios, San Francisco
- Genre: Punk rock; cowpunk; folk rock
- Length: 36:38
- Label: Fat Wreck Chords 603 (CD and LP)
- Producer: Swingin' Utters, Ryan Greene

Swingin' Utters chronology
BYO Split Series, Vol. 2 (1999)	Swingin' Utters (2000)	Dead Flowers, Bottles, Bluegrass, and Bones (2003)

Professional ratings
Review scores
Source	Rating
AllMusic	3/5 stars

Swingin' Utters is an album by American punk rock band Swingin' Utters, released in 2000. It was produced by Ryan Greene, and has a folkier sound than the band's previous albums.

== Critical reception ==
The Pembroke Observer wrote that "the opening track, 'Pills and Smoke', is immediately so retro sounding that it could reel anyone back into the days of crash and burn English punk rock, whereas 'Watching the Wayfarers' is a superb rockabilly, country blues number that's complete with mandolin and upright bass." The San Antonio Express-News wrote that the Utters "toss in elements of cowpunk, folk/rock and melody ... [their] songs stretch boundaries with instrumentation such as upright bass, violin, piano, cello and mandolin."

== Track listing ==
All songs written by Darius Koski, except for where noted.

1. "Pills & Smoke" – 2:34
2. "Taken Train" – 2:11
3. "Watching the Wayfarers" – 1:55
4. "The Note" (Max Huber) – 2:51
5. "Will Success Spoil Rock Hunter?" (Huber) – 2:33
6. "Playboys, Punks, and Pretty Things" – 3:05
7. "Second Skin" – 1:59
8. "Eddie's Teddy" (O'Brien) – 2:44
9. "Teen Idol Eyes" (Johnny Bonnel, Koski) – 2:25
10. "The Green Glass" (Huber) – 2:00
11. "Scum Grief" – 2:19
12. "Another Day" – 1:58
13. "Step Inside this Room" – 2:36
14. "Little Creeps" – 2:00
15. "My Glass House" (Aust Koski, Koski) – 3:28

== Personnel ==
- Johnny Bonnel (vocals)
- Max Huber (guitar, vocals; lead vocals on "The Note")
- Darius Koski (guitar, vocals, accordion, organ, viola, violin; lead vocals on "Watching the Wayfarers" and "My Glass House")
- Greg McEntee (drums)
- Spike Slawson (bass guitar, vocals; lead vocals on "The Green Glass"; guitar on "Scum Grief" and "Teen Idol Eyes")

Additional musicians:

- Max Butler (pedal steel guitar, mandolin)
- Pat Johnson (piano)
- Mikey Porter (cello)
- Rockin' Lloyd Tripp (upright bass on "Watching the Wayfarers")
- Ryan Greene (percussion)
