= Just Like Them =

Just Like Them may refer to:

- "Just Like Them", a 2012 song by Justin Bieber from Believe
- "Just Like Them", a 1995 song by Swingin' Utters from The Streets of San Francisco
