= Streets of San Francisco (disambiguation) =

The Streets of San Francisco is an American TV series.

Streets of San Francisco may also refer to:

- Streets of San Francisco (film), 1949 American crime drama
- The Streets of San Francisco (album), a 1995 album by Swingin' Utters

== See also ==
- "San Francisco (Be Sure to Wear Flowers in Your Hair)", 1967 song by Scott McKenzie
- List of streets in San Francisco
