= Re-Volts =

- Origin: San Francisco, California
- Genres: Punk rock
- Years active: 2007–present
- Members: Spike Slawson; Jack Dalrymple; Paul Oxborrow; Colin Delaney
- Past members: Darius Koski; Paul Scavuzzo; Heiko Schrepel
- Website: www.instagram.com/revolts.sf

The Re-Volts are an American punk band based out of San Francisco, California. All of the members of the band are also in other San Francisco-area punk bands; these include the Swingin' Utters, Filthy Thieving Bastards, Me First and the Gimme Gimmes, Dead To Me, One Man Army, The Hooks, toyGuitar, U.S. Bombs and United Blood.

The band released a self-titled EP, Re-Volts themselves on CD and subsequently on 10" vinyl and CD via Pirates Press Records. In 2018 they released the "Wages" 7" and the "Equator" flexi-disc, both on Pirates Press Records. In 2019 they released the "Leeches" 7" on Pirates Press Records.

== Members ==
- Spike Slawson – vocals and guitar
- Jack Dalrymple – guitar and vocals
- Paul Oxborrow – bass and vocals
- Colin Delaney – drums

== Discography ==
- Re-Volts EP (2007) Pirates Press Records
- Wages 7" (2018) Pirates Press Records
- Equator 7" flexi-disc (2018) Pirates Press Records
- Leeches 7" (2019) Pirates Press Records

=== Compilations ===
- Rock Against Malaria (2009) Eunuch Records
