= More Scared: The House of Faith Years =

Compilation album by Swingin' Utters
- Released: January 23, 1996
- Recorded: The House of Faith Studios, Palo Alto, California, 1991-93
- Genre: Punk rock
- Length: 38:35
- Label: SideOneDummy
- Producer: Bart Thurber

Swingin' Utters chronology
The Streets of San Francisco (1995)	More Scared: The House of Faith Years (1996)	A Juvenile Product of the Working Class (1996)

Professional ratings
Review scores
Source	Rating
Allmusic	3/5 stars

More Scared: The House of Faith Years is a compilation album by Californian punk rock band Swingin' Utters, released in 1996. The album chronicles some of the band's material from before they signed to Fat Wreck Chords - it was released because these songs were difficult to obtain otherwise.

== Track listing ==
1. "Strongman" (Koski) – 2:16
2. "Reggae Gets Big in a Small Town" (Bonnel) – 1:57
3. "Smoke like a Girl" (Koski) – 2:35
4. "Lazer Attack" (Wickersham) – 2:16
5. "Politician" (McEntee, Koski) – 3:02
6. "Nine to Five" (McEntee, Koski, Dison) – 1:28
7. "Could You Lie?" (Koski) – 2:15
8. "Mommy Mommy" (Callis – 2:43 (a cover of "No" by The Rezillos)
9. "Scared" (Wickersham) – 2:31
10. "No Eager Men" (Koski) – 2:59
11. "Petty Wage" (Koski) – 1:54
12. "Hello Charlatan" (Koski) – 2:47
13. "Proven Song" (Koski) – 2:53
14. "These Pretty Pleasures" (Dison) – 2:55
15. "Mr. Norris" (Koski, Dison) – 3:01
16. "Here We Are Nowhere" (Cluney) – 0:57 (cover of a song by Stiff Little Fingers)

Track #7 is from the band's first release, the 7-inch Gives You Strength EP. All nine tracks from Scared (10 inh E.P.) are present: here they are tracks #1, #2, #14, #9, #8, #15, #3, #6, and #13. Tracks #10, #11, #16, #12 are from the band's third release, the No Eager Men single .

Tracks #4 and #5 were previously unreleased.

== Credits ==
- Johnny Peebucks (Bonnel) (vocals)
- Greg McEntee (drums)
- Darius Koski (guitar)
- Kevin Wickersham (bass)
- Max Huber (guitar)
- Joel Dison (guitar "on 1st 13 tracks")
