= In July =

In July may refer to:

- In July (film) (Im Juli), a 2000 German-Turkish road movie
- Frozen Peas, or In July, a blooper audio recording of Orson Welles
