= Here, Under Protest =

Studio album by Swingin' Utters
- Released: April 26, 2011
- Genre: Punk rock, folk punk, country
- Length: 33:39
- Label: Fat Wreck Chords 754-2 (CD and LP)
- Producer: Jamie McMann

Swingin' Utters chronology
Hatest Grits: B-Sides And Bullshit (2008)	Here, Under Protest (2011)	Poorly Formed (2013)

Here, Under Protest is the seventh full-length album by Californian punk rock band Swingin' Utters. The title is taken from a segment from an Orson Welles blooper audio reel, and additionally the first track opens with a brief clip of Welles saying the part.

== Track listing ==
All songs written by Darius Koski, except where noted.

1. "Brand New Lungs" – 2:43
2. "Taking The Long Way" – 1:59
3. "Bent Collector of 1,000 Limbs" (Koski, Steve Bonnel) – 2:32
4. "Kick It Over" – 2:30
5. "Good Things" – 2:04
6. "Sketch Squandered Teen" (Koski, Johnny Bonnel) – 2:03
7. "Heavy Head" – 2:29
8. "(You've Got To) Give It All To The Man" (Koski, Spike Slawson) – 1:10
9. "Time On My Own" – 2:48
10. "Lepers, Thieves And Whores" (Koski, Bonnel) – 2:18
11. "Blindness Is Kind" – 2:59
12. "Reds And Blues And Beggars" – 2:16
13. "Scary Brittle Frame" (Koski, Bonnel) – 2:13
14. "Effortless Amnesiac" – 3:35

== Personnel ==
- Johnny Bonnel (vocals)
- Darius Koski (guitar, vocals)
- Jack Dalrymple (guitar, vocals)
- Greg McEntee (drums)
- Spike Slawson (bass, vocals)
