= Drowning in the Sea, Rising with the Sun =

Compilation album by Swingin' Utters
- Released: December 8, 2017
- Genre: Punk rock, folk punk
- Length: 79:39
- Label: Fat Wreck Chords

Swingin' Utters chronology
Fistful of Hollow (2014)	Drowning in the Sea, Rising with the Sun (2017)	Peace and Love (2018)

Professional ratings
Review scores
Source	Rating
Punknews.org	4.5/5 stars
AllMusic	4/5 stars

Drowning in the Sea, Rising with the Sun is the fourth compilation album by the punk band Swingin' Utters. The album contains fan favorites and some unreleased material. Drowning in the Sea, Rising with the Sun was released by Fat Wreck Chords on December 8, 2017 on CD and double LP.

== Track listing ==
1. Don't Ask Why - 2:11
2. As You Start Leaving - 2:47
3. No Eager Men - 2:45
4. Nowhere Fast - 1:54
5. Tell Them Told You So - 2:32
6. Five Lessons Learned - 1:57
7. Taking the Long Way - 2:00
8. My Glass House - 3:27
9. London Drunk - 2:03
10. Tied Down, Spit On - 1:19
11. Pills & Smoke - 2:35
12. Tell Me Lies - 2:11
13. The Librarians Are Hiding Something - 1:59
14. Fifteenth & T - 2:14
15. Brand New Lungs - 2:41
16. Beached Sailor - 2:10
17. End of the Week - 3:27
18. Kick It Over - 2:31
19. Mother of the Mad - 2:00
20. Glad - 2:11
21. Strongman - 2:13
22. Windspitting Punk - 2:15
23. From the Observatory - 2:45
24. Teenage Genocide - 1:40
25. Alice - 2:02
26. All That I Can Give - 2:24
27. Stupid Lullabies - 2:19
28. Fistful of Hollow - 1:37
29. A Promise to Distinction - 2:09
30. The Next in Line - 3:35
31. Stuck in a Circle - 2:14
32. Fruitless Fortunes - 2:50
33. Catastrophe - 4:42
