= The Thumbs =

American punk rock band

The Thumbs were an American punk rock band from Baltimore, Maryland. They were active from 1995 until approximately 2002. They were known for having an intense touring ethic, having completed nine U.S. tours, and two Japanese tours between 1997 and 2001. The band was formed by Mike Hall, Bobby Borte, and Mark Minnig, however Hall and Borte remained the only constant members amidst constant drummer changes.

== History ==
The Thumbs were formed when Mike Hall left his former band The Pee Tanks and Borte and Minnig left their former band Rubber Sole. While active, The Thumbs released records on their own Sneezeguard Records, as well as Soda Jerk Records, Adeline Records, and Snuffy Smile.

== Members ==
- Mike Hall - Vocals, Guitar (1995–1998), Vocals, Bass (1998–2003)
- Bobby Borte - Vocals, Guitar (1995–2003)
- Mark Minnig - Vocals, Bass (1995–1998)
- Tom Fortwengler - Drums US Tour Sept 1998
- Phil Spence - Drums (1996–1999), Sprague Dawley Rats recording (1996), Sweet Merciful Crap (1997), Make America Strong (1998)
- Lee Ashlin - Drums scattered appearances in late 1990s, 2001-2003 Japan Tour No. 2 Sept 2001
- Randy Rampage - Drums (1995–1996), self-titled 12-inch 1995, All Lesser Devils recording 1999, 2nd Snuffy Smile 7-inch recording 2001
- Roman Kuebler- Drums (2000–2001) Last Match recording
- Bug - Drums US/Japan Tour Sept 1999
- Friendly Pat - Drums US Tour March 1999
- Jason Gambrel - US Tour Jan-Mar 1997, Eldon recording 1999
- Pat from Crispus Attucks - Eldon recording 1999

== Discography ==
=== EPs ===
- Sprague Dawley Rats - 7-inch EP Sneezeguard Records
- Sweet Merciful Crap - 7-inch EP Soda Jerk Records
- All Lesser Devils - 7-inch/CD EP Adeline Records
- The Thumbs/The Urchin - Split 7-inch on Snuffy Smile
- The Thumbs/Jack Palance Band - Split 7-inch on ADD records
- The Thumbs/One Leaf - Split 7-inch on Snuffy Smile

=== LPs ===
- The Thumbs - 12-inch LP Sneezeguard Records
- Make America Strong - CD Soda Jerk Records
- Last Match - CD/LP Adeline Records

=== Compilations ===
- "Dropping Food On Their Heads Is Not Enough - GC Records - They Improve Ideas
- 52 Lessons on Life Reinforcement Records - They Improve Ideas
- Every Dog Will Have Its Day, Adeline Records Comp.2 - Hour One
- Fast Music Comp CD (Fast Music 2000) Song - "Drug Screamer"
- Might As Well Can't Dance CD (Adeline 2000) Song - "Ribbon Men"
- Dear Fred: Standby For The Next Objective CD (Sneezeguard, 1998.) Song - "I Don't"
- A.D.D. Zine Comp CD (A.D.D. Records, 1999) Song - "John Staab Pants"
- Letters From Punksville CD (Re-inforcement Records, 1998) Song - "Looking For The Cure"
- Punx Just Want To Have Fun cassette comp (8TH DImension Records, 1998) Song - "Sasquatch"
- Breathmint Comp CD (Breathmint Records, 1998) Song - "Happens All The Time" (recorded at WFMU OCT 97)
- Punker Than Your Mother CD (Soda Jerk, 1998) Song - "Pilot Fish"
- North American Takeover CD (Cloister Records, 1998) Songs - "Chrissy Snow", "Fall at Your Feet"
- It Takes a Dummy to Know a Dummy CD (Dumb Ass Records, 1997) Song - "Sprague Dawley Rats"
- If It's Not Punk, It's Junk CD (GFY Records, 1997) Song - "Shuck"
- Exploitational Sampler CD (Creep Records, 1996) Song - "Chrissy Snow"

== Where are they now? ==
- Mike and Bobby play for The Sick Sick Birds
- Lee Ashlin plays for The Fuses, The Swims, and Meanspirits
- Roman plays for The Oranges Band
- Mark Minnig plays bass in Kid Casanova and runs a coffee shop in New York City
