= Last Word Spoken =

Studio album by One Man Army
- Released: March 20, 2000
- Genre: Punk rock
- Length: 31:10
- Label: Adeline

One Man Army chronology
Dead End Stories (1998)	Last Word Spoken (2000)	Rumors and Headlines (2002)

Last Word Spoken is the second album by punk rock band One Man Army, which was released in 2000 through Adeline Records.

As of 2025, the album is not available on any streaming service and has been out of print for many years on CD and vinyl due to Adeline Records shutting down in 2017.

== Track listing ==
1. "The Old Songs" - 2:44
2. "No Controlling" - 2:16
3. "Bootlegger's Son" - 2:22
4. "Another Night" - 2:32
5. "All Your Friends" - 2:28
6. "Until Now" - 2:06
7. "The Lonely Road Nowhere" - 2:52
8. "Join the Ranks" - 2:03
9. "The Tune of the Leisure Pace" - 1:52
10. "Looming Disaster" - 3:07
11. "Red Light's Tinge" - 1:29
12. "Last Word Spoken" - 2:32
13. "The Holidays" - 2:47
