= Western Addiction =

American punk rock band

- Origin: San Francisco, California, United States
- Genres: Hardcore punk, punk rock, melodic hardcore
- Years active: 2003–2006, 2013-current.
- Labels: Fat Wreck Chords, No Idea
- Members: Jason Hall; Ken Yamazaki; Chad Williams; Mitch Paglia
- Past members: Sam Johnson; Tyson "Chicken" Annicharico; Tony Teixeira

Western Addiction is an American punk band based in San Francisco, California, United States. The band was formed by four veterans of the punk scene. Some of the members previously worked for Fat Wreck Chords. They have toured internationally in both the USA, Europe, and Japan.

== Members ==
- Jason Hall - Vocals
- Ken Yamazaki - Guitar
- Mitch Paglia - Bass
- Chad Williams - Drums

== Past members ==
- Sam Johnson - Bass/Vocals
- Tyson "Chicken" Annicharico - Bass/Vocals
- Tony Teixeira - Guitar

== Discography ==
=== Albums ===
- Cognicide (2005)
- Tremulous (2017)
- Frail Bray (2020)
- Psychedelic Munitions (2026)

=== EPs & 7"s ===
- New Mexican Disaster Squad/Western Addiction Split (2004)
- Remember to Dismember (2003)
- Pines (2013)
- I'm Not the Man That I Thought I'd Be (2015)

== Trivia ==
- Ken Yamazaki played in Enemy You, and also in Dead to Me with bandmate, Chicken.
- Chicken plays in Dead to Me and was nominated as 'Sexiest Vegetarian' by PETA in 2006.
- Chad Williams plays in Complaints and formerly Radio Reelers.
- Sam Johnson played in Dead to Me, No Friends, VRGNS and New Mexican Disaster Squad.
- Tony Teixeira currently plays bass with Swingin' Utters.
