= Tremulous (album) =

Studio album by Western Addiction
- Released: March 10, 2017
- Studios: Russell’s Teapot; Los Angeles, California; Motor Studios; San Francisco, California
- Genres: Punk rock, hardcore punk
- Length: 32:05
- Label: Fat Wreck Chords
- Producer: Joey Cape

Western Addiction chronology
Cognicide (2005)	Tremulous (2017)	Frail Bray (2020)

Tremulous is the second studio album by the San Francisco based punk band Western Addiction. The album was released by Fat Wreck Chords in March 2017, more than ten years after their debut album Cognicide in 2005. It was produced by Joey Cape of Lagwagon and Me First and the Gimme Gimmes. The artwork was done by Belgian artist Thierry De Cordier.

== Track listing ==
1. "Clatter and Hiss" – 2:39
2. "Family of Boys" – 1:39
3. "Masscult, Vulgarians and Entitlement" – 2:25
4. "Taedium" – 3:13
5. "Ditch Riders" – 3:12
6. "Honeycreeper" – 3:01
7. "Righteous Lightning" – 3:30
8. "Red Emeralds" – 1:46
9. "Humming Bars of White Light" – 2:17
10. "The Rockery" – 2:50
11. "Your Life is Precious" – 5:34

== Performers ==
Credits adapted from Allmusic.com and Pirate! Promotion

- Tyson Annicharico – bass
- Chad Williams – drums, keyboards
- Ken Yamazaki – guitar, background vocals
- Tony Teixeira – guitar, background vocals
- Jason Hall – vocals
- Joey Cape - keyboards, background vocals, engineer, producer
- Todd Kowalski - vocals on "Taedium"
