= Moscow Penny Ante =

Studio album by Dead to Me
- Released: October 25, 2011
- Length: 34:29
- Label: Fat Wreck Chords

Dead to Me chronology
African Elephants (2009)	Moscow Penny Ante (2011)	I Wanna Die in Los Angeles (2016)

Moscow Penny Ante is the third studio album by American punk rock band Dead to Me, released through Fat Wreck Chords on October 25, 2011.

== Pre-release ==
In an interview before the album's release, band member, Tyson Annicharico, stated his pride in the album. He suggested that this pride came from the band's musical variety. He believes that the band cannot be "pigeon-holed" into one genre but was able to experiment musically. A review on R5 Productions supported this view, commenting, "as usual, it’s nothing less than the exact opposite of what you’d expect from Dead To Me."

On the name of the album, Annicharico suggests that the title has a double meaning. 'Penny Ante' was the term Malcolm X used to describe small-time criminals - those not big enough to be taken seriously by criminal gangs. He describes the band's position in the music industry as analogous to 'penny ante' criminals, saying "we scrape by and do what we can, but we think we run a pretty good hustle as it were."

== Track listing ==
No.	Title	Length
1.	"Undertow"	2:41
2.	"Reckless Behavior"	2:39
3.	"The Evolution Will Be Tele-Visualized"	2:43
4.	"The Hand with Inherited Rings"	2:55
5.	"No Lullabies"	2:39
6.	"The Trials of Oscar Wilde"	2:47
7.	"The Monarch Hotel"	3:00
8.	"Never Relief"	3:02
9.	"I Love My Problems"	3:02
10.	"Dead Pigeon Tricks"	2:32
11.	"Victims of No Ambition"	2:54
12.	"The World Has Gone Mad"	3:35

== Personnel ==
Dead to Me

- Tyson "Chicken" Annicharico – bass guitar, lead vocals
- Sam Johnson – guitar, vocals
- Ken Yamazaki – guitar, backing vocals
- Ian Anderson – drums
