= Good Views, Bad News =

Studio album by Broadway Calls
- Released: August 18, 2009
- Recorded: Early 2009
- Studio: Fort Collins, Colorado
- Genre: Pop punk, punk rock
- Length: 34:09
- Label: SideOneDummy
- Producer: Bill Stevenson, Jason Livermore

Broadway Calls chronology
Broadway Calls (2007)	Good Views, Bad News (2009)	Comfort/Distraction (2013)

Singles from Good Views, Bad News
- 1. "Be All That You Can't Be" Released: July 21, 2009

Professional ratings
Review scores
Source	Rating
Allmusic	4/5 stars
Punknews.org	3.5/5 stars
Read Junk	3.5/5 stars

Good Views, Bad News is the second album by the punk rock band Broadway Calls. It was recorded at Blasting Room in Fort Collins, Colorado, Produced by Descendents drummer Bill Stevenson & Jason Livermore.

== Release ==
The album was preceded by the single "Be All That You Can't Be", released on July 21, 2009 on 7" vinyl in 3 colours. On August 4, 2009, "Tonight Is Alive" was posted on the band's Myspace profile. Three days later, a music video was released for "Be All You Can't Be". On the album's release date, each of the tracks were made available for streaming through a different website, such as "Midnight Hour" through Punknews.org. They appeared at the Reading and Leeds Festivals in the UK in August 2009. Following this, they supported Streetlight Manifesto on their North American tour. In October and November 2009, they supported the Bouncing Souls on their headlining US tour, and appeared at The Fest. In November and December 2009, they went on a European tour with Set Your Goals and Fireworks. In January 2010, the band supported Anti-Flag on their headlining US tour for a few shows. In March 2010, the band appeared at Harvest of Hope Fest and the South by Southwest music conference. Bookending these performances were a handful of shows with Red City Radio and Cobra Skulls. Following this, the band went on a North American tour with the Flatliners and Cobra Skulls until April 2010. Additional dates were added, extending the trek into May 2010. On May 13, 2010 a music video was released for "Basement Royalty". In August 2010, the band performed at the Summer Sonic Festival in Japan.

== Track listing ==
All tracks are written by Broadway Calls.

Good Views, Bad News
No.	Title	Length
1.	"Midnight Hour"	2:50
2.	"Be All That You Can't Be"	2:57
3.	"Election Night"	3:12
4.	"Basement Royalty"	3:04
5.	"To the Sheets"	2:45
6.	"Give Up the Ghost"	2:56
7.	"Sundowners"	3:09
8.	"Tonight Is Alive"	3:48
9.	"Best Year"	3:39
10.	"Wake Up Call"	2:59
11.	"At the End"	2:50
Total length:		34:09

Bonus tracks

UK bonus track
No.	Title	Length
12.	"The Call Out"	2:11

== Personnel ==
Ty Vaughn - Lead Vocals/Guitar
Matt Koenig - Bass/Vocals
Josh Baird - Drums / Percussion

Other Contributors

- Produced by Bill Stevenson & Jason Livermore
- Mixed by Unknown
- Recorded Blasting Room in Fort Collins, Colorado, United States.
