= Cognicide =

Studio album by Western Addiction
- Released: November 1, 2005
- Recorded: 2005
- Genre: Punk rock, hardcore punk
- Label: Fat Wreck Chords

Western Addiction chronology
New Mexican Disaster Squad / Western Addiction (2004)	Cognicide (2005)	Tremulous (2017)

Professional ratings
Review scores
Source	Rating
Punknews.org	3.5/5 stars
AllMusic	3/5 stars

Cognicide is Western Addiction's first full-length album. It was released on Fat Wreck Chords on November 1, 2005. The album is known for featuring a sound heavily inspired by Hardcore punk acts of the 1980s. Fat Mike has often listed Cognicide as one of the greatest releases on his label, Fat Wreck Chords, calling it one of the best hardcore albums he's ever heard. Joey Cape of Lagwagon has also stated that it is his favorite album released on Fat Wreck Chords.

== Track listing ==
1. "Charged Words"
2. "Mailer, Meet Jim"
3. "A Poor Recipe For Civic Cohesion"
4. "The Church Of Black Flag"
5. "We Tech Supported A Manipulator"
6. "Incendiary Minds"
7. "It's Funny, I Don't Feel Like A Winner"
8. "When A Good Friend Attacks"
9. "Matrons Of The Canals"
10. "Face Cancer"
11. "Corralling Pestilence"
12. "Animals And Children"

== Additional credits ==
- Alex Newport – producer, engineer
- John Greenham – mastering
