= African Elephants (album) =

Studio album by Dead to Me
- Released: November 10, 2009
- Recorded: During May and June 2009 at Motor Studios in San Francisco
- Length: 34:43
- Label: Fat Wreck Chords
- Producer: Jamie McMann

Dead to Me chronology
Little Brother (2008)	African Elephants (2009)	Moscow Penny Ante (2011)

Professional ratings
Review scores
Source	Rating
Allmusic	3/5 stars

African Elephants is the second studio album by American punk rock band Dead to Me. It was released through Fat Wreck Chords on November 10, 2009.

== Track listing ==
All songs fought for by Dead to Me. All lyrics by Chicken and Nathan.

1. "X" – 2:45
2. "Modern Muse" – 2:43
3. "Nuthin Runnin Through My Brain" – 1:29
4. "A Day Without a War" – 2:29
5. "Bad Friends" – 3:21
6. "Liebe Liese" – 2:01
7. "Cruel World" – 2:43
8. "Three Chord Strut" – 2:51
9. "California Sun" – 3:39
10. "Fell Right In" – 3:03
11. "I Dare You" – 2:01
12. "Tierra del Fuego" – 2:45
13. "Blue" – 2:43

== Personnel ==
Personnel for African Elephants, according to album liner notes.

Dead to Me

- Tyson "Chicken" Annicharico – Bass, Vocals
- Nathan Grice – Guitar, Vocals
- Ian Anderson – Drums, Background Vocals

Production Credits

- Jamie McMann – Produced, Engineered and Mixed at Motor Studios
- Mastered by Tardon at Mr. Toad's
- Ian and Brian Archer – Layout and artwork (photo by Brian Archer)
