= One Man Army (band) =

American punk rock band

- Origin: San Francisco, California, U.S.
- Genres: Punk rock
- Years active: 1996–2005; 2011-present
- Labels: Adeline; BYO
- Members: Jack Dalrymple; Brandon Pollack
- Past members: Chip Hanna; James Kotter; Heiko Schrepel

One Man Army is an American punk rock band that was formed in San Francisco, California, United States, in 1996 and separated in 2005 and reunited in 2011. The band was discovered by Billie Joe Armstrong while playing in an East Bay club, and their debut album Dead End Stories was the first release on Adeline Records, Armstrong's label.

== History ==
Originally consisting of Jack Dalrymple (guitar, lead vocals), Brandon Pollack (drums), and James Kotter (bass), the members at the time of separation were Dalrymple, Heiko Schrepel (bass, backup vocals) and Chip Hanna (drums).

In 2006, Dalrymple joined Swingin' Utters as a guitarist and backing vocalist and has been with the band ever since. Jack was also guitarist and singer for Dead to Me, formed with Brandon Pollack. On July 31, 2009, Dead to Me announced that Jack was no longer recording or touring with the band, in order to devote time to his newborn baby, Jack Dalrymple III. Dalrymple also started another band with fellow Swingin' Utters members Spike Slawson and Darius Koski, called the Re-Volts.

In 2011 it was announced on the Adeline Records website that One Man Army had reunited, and that Adeline Records planned to re-release One Man Army's first two albums. The reunited line-up is Jack Dalrymple, Heiko Schrepel, and Brandon Pollack. A four-song EP entitled She's an Alarm (produced by Jamie McMann) was released in Aug 2012 on green and pink neon 7" vinyl. She's An Alarm and their first 2 albums were also released digitally at this time. As of 2025, the band's first two albums along with 2012's She's an Alarm, have been out of print for many years likely due to Adeline Records shutting down in 2017. Neither album is available on any streaming service. Only their third album, which was released through BYO Records, remains available on streaming services.

On April 6, 2015, bassist Heiko Schrepel died. While there has been no official confirmation by the band as to their current status, their lack of activity since Schrepel's death has led many to believe that the group is no longer together.

== Discography ==
Albums:

- Dead End Stories (1998, Adeline Records)
- Last Word Spoken (2000, Adeline Records)
- Rumors and Headlines (2002, BYO Records)

EPs:

- Shooting Blanks EP
- Bootlegger's Son EP, TKO Records
- Fat Club 7", Fat Wreck Chords (2001)
- BYO Split Series, Vol. 5 (split with Alkaline Trio), BYO Records (2004)
- She's An Alarm, Adeline Records (2012)

DVD:

- One Man Army: The Show Must Go Off (2003 on Kung Fu Records)
