= Peace and Love (Swingin' Utters album) =

Studio album by Swingin' Utters
- Released: August 31, 2018
- Genres: Punk rock, street punk
- Length: 39:00 ±
- Label: Fat Wreck Chords
- Producer: Chris Dugan

Swingin' Utters chronology
Drowning in the Sea, Rising with the Sun (2017)	Peace and Love (2018)

Professional ratings
Review scores
Source	Rating
New Noise Magazine	3.5/5 stars
Punk Rock Theory	8/10 stars
ReadJunk	3.5/5 stars
Sound Renaissance	8/10 stars

Peace and Love is the tenth studio album by American punk band Swingin' Utters. Peace and Love was released on 31 August 2018 by Fat Wreck Chords. The album was produced by Chris Dugan, who also worked with, among others, Green Day, Iggy Pop and U2.

In July 2018 the song "Human Potential" was put online. "Undertaker, Undertake" followed in August. Later, just before the official release of Peace and Love, the entire album was made available for streaming.

== Background ==
Peace and Love is the most political album of the Swingin' Utters to date. The band states that this textual change is a direct consequence of the policy of president Donald Trump, who won the US presidential election in 2016, whose policy singer Johnny "Peebucks" Bonnel describes as "sexist, racist and nationalist".

Peace and Love is the first Swingin' Utters album to feature a completely new rhythm section, consisting of drummer Luke (who joined the band in 2015) and bass guitarist Tony Teixeira (who joined in 2017). Both band members previously played in Cobra Skulls. The artwork of Peace and Love was also inspired by them.

== Track listing ==
1. "Undertaker, Undertake"
2. "Sirens"
3. "Louise and Her Spider"
4. "E.C.T."
5. "Dubstep"
6. "Constant Companion"
7. "Deranged"
8. "Demons of Springtime"
9. "Human Potential"
10. "Seeds of Satisfaction"
11. "Yes I Hope He Dies"
12. "Sleeping"
13. "Imitation of Silence"
14. "Drinkist"
15. "H.L.S."

== Personnel ==
Performers

- Tony Teixeira - bass guitar, vocals
- Johnny Peebucks - vocals, artwork
- Darius Koski - guitar, vocals
- Jack Dalrymple - guitar, vocals
- Luke Ray - drums

Production

- Chris Dugan - producing, mixing, engineering
- Ben Hirschfield - engineering
