= Rumors and Headlines =

Studio album by One Man Army
- Released: 2002
- Genre: Punk rock
- Label: BYO

One Man Army chronology
Last Word Spoken (2000)	Rumors and Headlines (2002)

Rumors and Headlines is an album by Californian punk rock group One Man Army. Their third and final album, it was released in 2002 by BYO Records. Featuring cover art and layout design as well as photography from artist Mark deSalvo. As of 2025, the album remains the band's only studio album still available for purchase and on streaming services. Their first two albums have been long out of print and unavailable having been released on the now defunct Adeline Records label.

== Track listing ==
1. "Victoria"
2. "It's Empty"
3. "S.O.S"
4. "All Night Long"
5. "Have Nots and Heartbreak"
6. "Leave Me Alone"
7. "Casualty"
8. "Next Generation"
9. "She Wants Me Dead"
10. "Here We Are"
11. "Rotting in the Doldrums"
12. "Sleeper"
