= Little Brother (EP) =

EP by Dead to Me
- Released: October 28, 2008
- Genre: Punk rock
- Length: 13:00
- Label: Fat Wreck Chords
- Producer: Alex Newport, Asst. Producer- Jamie McMann

Dead to Me chronology
Cuban Ballerina (2006)	Little Brother (2008)	African Elephants (2009)

Little Brother is an EP by punk rock band Dead to Me. It was released in October 2008 on Fat Wreck Chords.

Punknews.org rated the EP four stars.

== Track listing ==
1. "Don't Wanna" - 2:36
2. "Arrhythmic Palpitations" - 1:54
3. "Little Brother" - 4:06
4. "Ran That Scam" - 2:39
5. "What's Wrong" - 1:45
