= New Age Records =

New Age Records is a hardcore punk record label founded by Mike Hartsfield in 1988, featuring bands such as Turning Point, Mouthpiece, and Redemption 87. The label was founded in Southern California.

== Discography ==
| Cat. # | Year (First Pressing) | Artist | Title | Format | Ref. |
|---|---|---|---|---|---|
| 1 | 1988 | Walk Proud | Be Yourself | 7" | |
| 2 | 1990 | Pressure Release | Prison of My Own | 7" | |
| 3 | 1990 | Powerhouse | Powerhouse | 7" | |
| 4 | 1990 | Turning Point | It's Always Darkest | 12" | |
| 5 | 1990 | Outspoken | Survival | 7" | |
| 6 | 1990 | Up Front | Daybreak | 7" | |
| 7 | 1991 | Various Artists | Words To Live By... | 7" | |
| 8 | 1991 | Mouthpiece | Mouthpiece | 7" | |
| 9 | 1991 | Lifetime | Lifetime | 7" | |
| 10 | 1991 | Ressurection [sic] | Ressurection | 7" | |
| 11 | 1992 | Strife | My Fire Burns On... | 7" | |
| 12 | 1992 | Unbroken | You Won't Be Back | 7" | |
| 13 | 1996 | Outspoken | Light In the Dark | LP | |
| 14 | 1993 | Mean Season | Bleed to Me | 7" | |
| 15 | 1992 | Lifetime | Background | LP | |
| 16 | 1994 | Outspoken | The Current | 7" | |
