= Vienna (film) =

- Directed by: Orson Welles
- Starring: Orson Welles; Arte Johnson; Mickey Rooney; Senta Berger
- Original language: English

Production
- Cinematography: Giorgio Tonti
- Running time: 8 minutes (incomplete)

Original release
- Release: 1968

Vienna (also known as Orson Welles' Vienna or Spying in Vienna) is a 1968 American short film directed and written by Orson Welles. It was originally produced as part of his abandoned CBS television special, Orson's Bag. However, in 1969, with the project close to completion, CBS withdrew their funding over Welles' long-running disputes with US authorities regarding his tax status. The film remained uncompleted. Despite its name, Vienna freely mixes footage shot in Vienna, Zagreb, and a Los Angeles studio. An 8-minute segment was restored by the Munich Film Museum in 1999.

== Plot of restored segment ==
The film is an eclectic blend of faux-documentary and comical skits. Welles presents a leisurely guided tour of "Vienna," commenting on the city and its inhabitants. He visits the Sacher Hotel, and the Wiener Riesenrad (Giant Ferris Wheel) at the Prater amusement park, both of which appeared in the 1949 film The Third Man, in which Welles had a starring role. The film concludes with a spy film spoof, as Welles becomes involved in the abduction of "the most beautiful woman in Vienna".

== Cast ==
- Orson Welles as self
- Senta Berger as abducted woman
- Mickey Rooney as kidnapper
- Arte Johnson
- Peter Bogdanovich as Welles' assistant
