= Wait for It... Wait for It =

"Wait for It... Wait for It!!"

Single by Dead to Me
- A-side: "'Wait for It... Wait for It!!'"
- B-side: "'Attack Form and Pay Stub'"
- Released: September 10, 2010
- Recorded: 2010
- Genre: Punk rock
- Label: Shield Recordings, Brick Gun Records
- Songwriter: Dead to Me

Alternative covers
- Cover of the US release

"Wait for It... Wait for It!!" is a 7" vinyl single by Californian punk rock band Dead to Me, released on September 10, 2010 in Europe on Shield Recordings, to promote their 2010 European tour. Featuring three brand new songs, the record was also released on October 30, 2010 in the US by Brick Gun Records, at the Fest 9.

== Track listing ==
All lyrics and music by Dead to Me.

=== 7" version ===
| No. | Title | Length |
|---|---|---|
| 1. | "Wait for It... Wait for It!!" | 2:47 |
| 2. | "Attack Form" | 2:56 |
| 3. | "Pay Stub" | 2:28 |

== Personnel ==
=== Band ===
- Chicken – bass guitar, lead vocals
- Sam Johnson – guitar, vocals
- Ken Yamazaki – guitar, backing vocals
- Ian Anderson – drums
