= I Wanna Die in Los Angeles =

EP by Dead to Me
- Released: October 21, 2016
- Recorded: July 2016
- Studio: Jingletown Studios
- Genre: Punk rock, pop punk
- Length: 8:54
- Label: Fat Wreck Chords
- Producer: Tyson "Chicken" Annicharico

Dead to Me chronology
Moscow Penny Ante (2011)	I Wanna Die in Los Angeles (2016)

Professional ratings
Review scores
Source	Rating
Punknews.org	4/5 stars
New Noise Magazine	3.5/5 stars

I Wanna Die in Los Angeles is the second EP by punk rock band Dead to Me. It was released in October 2016 by Fat Wreck Chords and is their first release following 2011's Moscow Penny Ante.

== Track listing ==
1. I Wanna Die in Los Angeles – 02:22
2. Tune it Out – 02:06
3. Comforting the Disturbed and Disturbing the Comfortable – 04:26
