= Filthy Thieving Bastards =

- Origin: Oakland, California, United States
- Genres: Punk rock, Celtic rock, folk rock
- Years active: 2000–present
- Labels: BYO Records, TKO Records
- Members: Johnny Bonnel; Darius Koski; Spike Slawson; Randy Burk
- Past members: Greg Lisher

The Filthy Thieving Bastards is an American folk/punk rock group formed in 2000 in San Francisco, California. The band was originally a side project put together by Johnny Bonnel and Darius Koski of the Swingin' Utters. Spike Slawson (also from Swingin' Utters) later joined the band, along with recording engineer Randy Burk. Greg Lisher from Camper Van Beethoven guested on guitar for several songs on their second release. Their music is influenced by folk rock, Celtic rock, country music, 60's pop, and punk rock, with an acknowledged and oft-noted debt to the music of The Pogues.

The project's first (short) album, Our Fathers Sent Us, was released by TKO Records in 2000. In 2001, the band released A Melody of Retreads and Broken Quills on BYO Records.

The next album My Pappy Was a Pistol was released in 2005. In March 2007 Filthy Thieving Bastards released their next album ... and I'm A Son of a Gun on BYO Records, featuring an appearance by Spider Stacey of the Pogues. The naming of the last two albums was a nod to American Singer/Songwriter Roger Miller.

The song "Drug Lords of the Avenues" is featured on the in-game soundtrack for Skate.

== Discography ==
- Our Fathers Sent Us (E.P.) - 2000
- A Melody of Retreads and Broken Quills - 2001
- My Pappy Was a Pistol - 2005
- I'm A Son of a Gun - 2007

== Reviews ==
- "My Pappy Was A Pistol" CD Review by Chris Andrade for kMNR...Music News Weekly
