= The Streets of San Francisco (album) =

Studio album by Swingin' Utters
- Released: May 8, 1995 (CD/LP); October 23, 2001 (CD re-release)
- Recorded: Art of Ears , Hayward, California, in one week of August 1994
- Genres: Hardcore punk; punk rock
- Length: 42:08
- Labels: New Red Archives (CD/LP 1995); Fat Wreck Chords (CD 2001)
- Producer: Lars Frederiksen

Swingin' Utters chronology
| No Eager Men (1993) | The Streets of San Francisco (1995) | The Sounds Wrong EP (1995) |

The Streets of San Francisco is the second full-length album by American punk rock band Swingin' Utters, released in 1995. It was produced by Lars Frederiksen of Rancid. All songs were newly recorded for the album, although several had been on the band's previous releases.

The original LP was issued by New Red Archives and released on at least four different colors of vinyl: orange, yellow, purple and blue.

Professional ratings
Review scores
| Source | Rating |
|---|---|
| Allmusic | 4/5 stars |

== Track listing ==
All songs written by Darius Koski, except where noted.

1. "Storybook Disease" - 2:22
2. "Jackie Jab" (Johnny Bonnel/Koski/Kevin Wickersham) - 1:44
3. "Tied Down, Spit On" - 1:19
4. "Teenage Genocide" (Koski/Wickersham) - 1:39
5. "Catastrophe" - 4:53
6. "Mr. Believer" - 2:23
7. "Well Wisher" - 1:22
8. "No Place in the Sun" (Bonnel/Koski)- 2:29
9. "(A) Petty Wage" - 1:59
10. "Come On!" (Joel Dison) - 1:34
11. "No Eager Men" - 2:46
12. "(A) Beached Sailor" - 2:08
13. "(Take Me to the) Riverbank" - 2:29
14. "Just Like Them" (Bonnel/Koski) - 1:47
15. "Stars and Starlets" (Bonnel/Koski) - 1:15
16. "Soldier Boy" - 2:17
17. "Last Chance" - 1:51
18. "All Laced Up (But Pitfallen)" (Bonnel/Dison/Koski) - 2:45
19. "Expletive Deleted" - 3:06

== Personnel ==
- Johnny Peebucks: lead vocals
- Darius Koski: guitar, vocals, accordion on tracks #4, 12, 17
- Max Huber: guitar
- Greg McEntee: drums
- Kevin Wickersham: bass guitar
