= Banquet Records =

Record shop and music label in London, England

- Banquet Records Logo
- Company type: Limited company
- Industry: Retail
- Genre: Independent Record Shop
- Founded: 2002
- Headquarters: 52 Eden Street, Kingston upon Thames, KT1 1EE
- Area served: South West London
- Key people: Jon Tolley & Mike Smith - Owners
- Products: CDs, Vinyl Records
- Owner: Jon Tolley and Mike Smith
- Website: banquetrecords.com

Banquet Records is a record shop in Kingston upon Thames, Greater London. Formerly part of the Beggars Banquet Records retail chain, it became fully independent in 2002. It stocks a broad range of music on both vinyl and CD. The establishment is also home to Gravity DIP music management, as well as the Banquet Records record label.

== History ==
Started as part of the Beggars Banquet chain of record stores before becoming fully independent in 2002. The store was sold to the then manager, however decreased profits led the store to near bankruptcy towards the end of 2004.

In February 2005, Banquet Records was taken over by new owners; previous employees of the Beggars store, Jon Tolley and Mike Smith.

In 2013, 2017, 2020 and 2021, the store won Music Week's award for best independent retailer of the year.

== Services ==
The store uses its slogan "More than just your local record store" to provide services other than the sale of music, as it also runs various concerts, club nights and in-stores in and around Kingston upon Thames. The use of slogan has been described as such: "The premise outlined in their advertising strap line is simple: 'More than your local record store'. And it is incredibly apt. Not just content with supplying Kingston's art school students and music aficionados with their favourites, Banquet Records has firmly placed itself at the heart of this vibrant town's music scene."

It stocks music on both vinyl and CD but mainly specialises in new music from indie, punk, emo, electronica, house, drum 'n' bass and hip hop and funk genres. As well as selling Vinyl Records and CDs, the store also sells merch, record players, record boxes and general vinyl accessories.

The store takes part in Record Store Day, an annual celebration of independent record stores.

== Promotions ==
=== In-stores ===
Banquet Records regularly features in store performances. Bands that have performed in store at Banquet include: Beans On Toast, Shed Seven, Nadine Shah, Scouting for Girls, Kojey Radical, Mayday Parade; Title Fight; Frank Iero; The Flatliners; Gnarwolves; Lemuria; Knuckle Puck; Jimmy Eat World; Moose Blood; Great Cynics; Apologies, I have none; and Trash Boat.

=== Other shows ===
Banquet Records also holds separate one-off shows in and around Kingston showcasing some of the biggest bands in the country. The majority are held at PRYZM Kingston or in-store with additional shows at St John's Church and The Fighting Cocks. The Store hosted a Blink-182 concert at the Rose Theatre, which it claimed was the store's biggest show, for the lead up to the band's new album.

Other major artists to have played in Kingston at shows organised by Banquet include Rod Stewart, Madness, Rita Ora, Stormzy, The Who, Johnny Marr, Craig David, Biffy Clyro, The Specials, Gary Barlow, Gorillaz, Fall Out Boy, Nile Rodgers & CHIC, Shania Twain, Jungle and Paloma Faith.

== Record label ==
The Banquet Records shop is also home to a music label of the same name. It has issued music by UK artists, sometimes to support tours. It also release foreign artist which don't have UK distribution deals. The label was created by the current owners of the shop. They were actually running the label before they bought the shop in 2004. Artists released include:

- Modern Baseball
- Lightyear
- Tonight Alive
