= Comadre (band) =

American screamo band

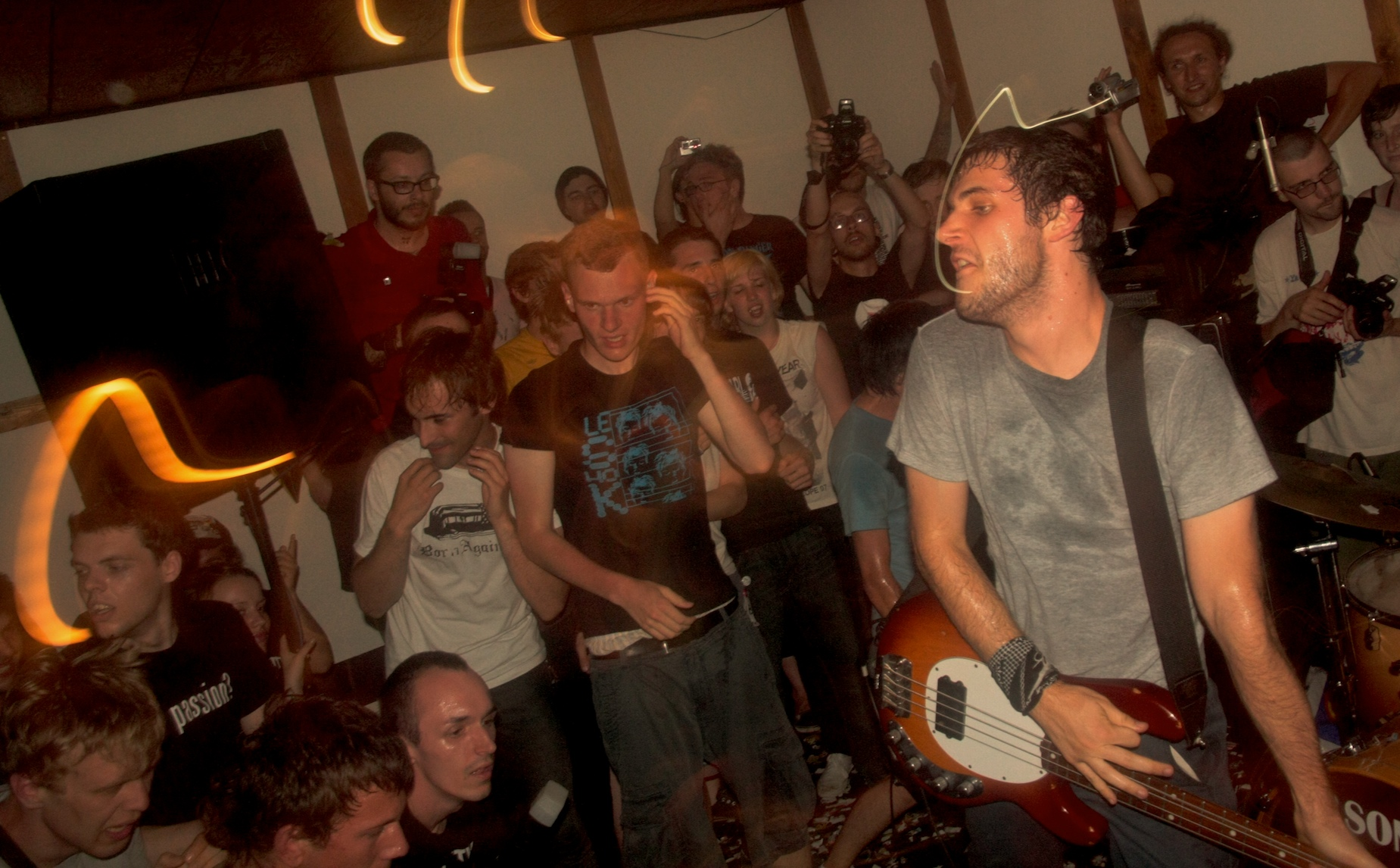
- Comadre performing in 2008

Background information
- Also known as: Coffin (2004)
- Origin: Redwood City, California, U.S.
- Genres: Screamo
- Years active: 2004–2013
- Labels: Bloodtown; Dood; Cosmic Note
- Spinoff of: Heartcrosslove, One's Own Ruin, What Life Makes Us, Light This City
- Past members: Wesley Elsbree; Juan Gabe; Kenny Gabe; Jack Shirley; Steven Shirley

Comadre (formerly Coffin) was a screamo band from Redwood City, California, composed of former members of Heartcrosslove, One's Own Ruin, What Life Makes Us, and Light This City. Their sound is a shoot-off of hardcore and punk, played fast and chaotic with an abundance of energy, but with a large focus on melody and tunefulness as well. Their influences can perhaps best be shown by the covers the band has performed live, by groups such as Rites of Spring, Refused, Kid Dynamite, and Suicide File.

== History ==
After playing a handful of shows and releasing a three-song demo under the moniker Coffin, the band changed their name to Comadre in the fall of 2004. The word "comadre," in addition to being loosely translated as "godmother," is a slang term for anyone not related by blood being a part of another's family.

Since their formation, the band has released four LPs and one EP on their own Bloodtown Recordings, Dood Records, Cosmic Note Records in Japan, and ADAGIO830 Records in Europe. They have toured the United States and Japan extensively - in America most commonly with Los Angeles-based "cinema-grind" band Graf Orlock, and in Japan with hardcore band Endzweck.

The band has also released a series of mixtapes, which feature collaborations with other bands.

== Lineup ==
- Wesley Elsbree (drums)
- Juan Gabe (vocals, of Heartcrosslove)
- Kenny Gabe (guitar, of Heartcrosslove)
- Jack Shirley (guitar, of One's Own Ruin)
- Steven Shirley (bass, of One's Own Ruin and Light This City)

== Discography ==
=== Albums ===
- The Youth (2004)
- Burn Your Bones (2006)
- A Wolf Ticket (2009)
- Comadre (2013)

=== EPs ===
- More Songs About the Man (2005)

=== Splits ===
- Trainwreck split (2007)
- Glasses split (2010)

=== Compilation appearances ===
- Carry The Torche: A Tribute To Kid Dynamite (2009)
- Live At The Atlantic Vol III: Fest Edition (2009)
- The Emo Annihilation (2008)
