= Swingin' Utters =

American punk rock band

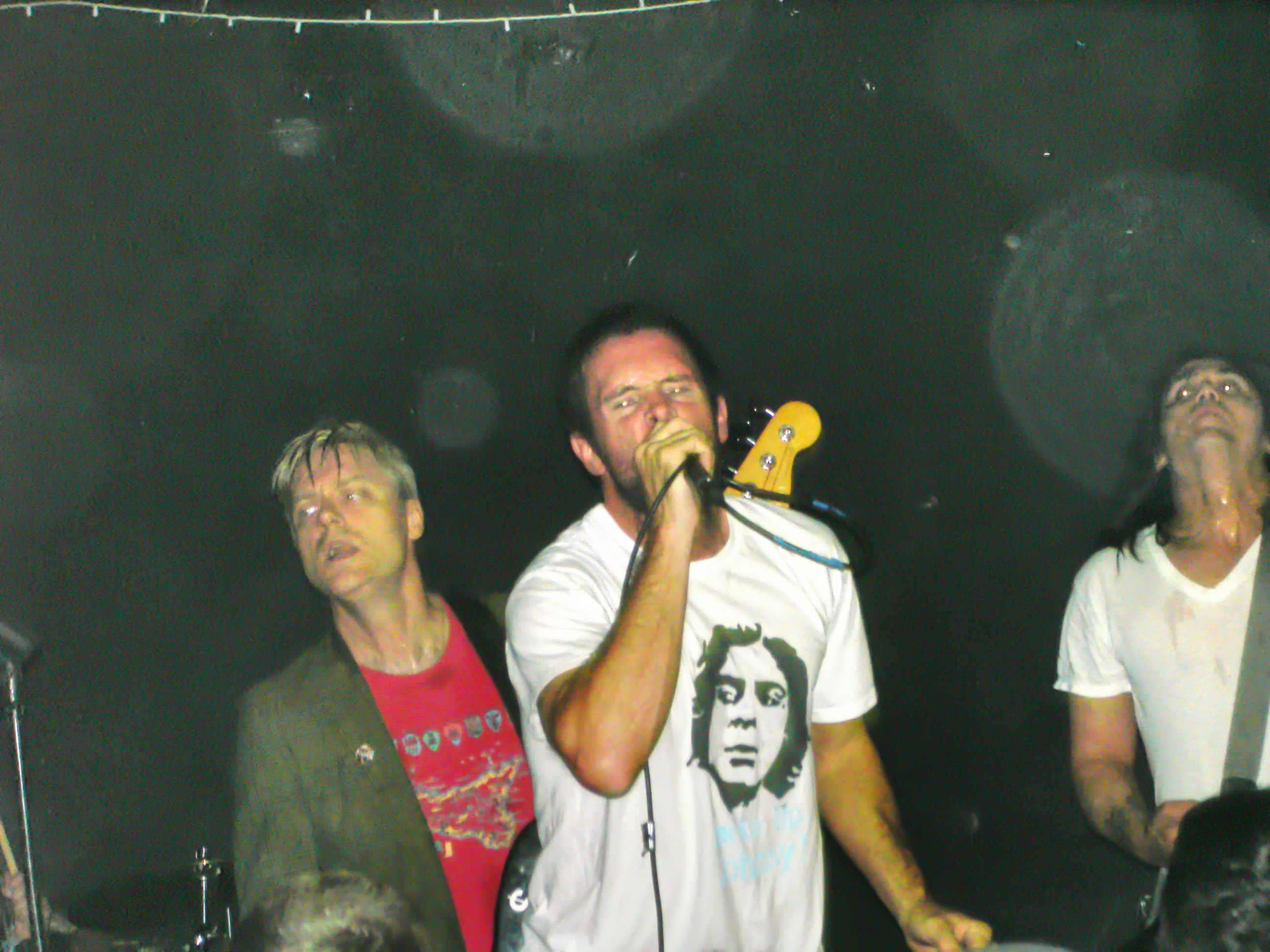
- Swingin' Utters at 924 Gilman St. on December 4, 2009. Left to right: Spike Slawson, Johnny "Peebucks" Bonnel, and Jack Dalrymple.

Background information
- Origin: Santa Cruz, California
- Genres: Punk rock; street punk; cowpunk
- Years active: 1988–present
- Labels: SideOneDummy, New Red Archives, Quality of Life, BYO Records, TKO, Fat Wreck Chords
- Spinoffs: Filthy Thieving Bastards; Re-Volts
- Members: Johnny "Peebucks" Bonnel; Darius Koski; Jack Dalrymple; Tony Teixeira; Luke Ray
- Past members: Aric McKenna; Kevin Wickersham; Greg McEntee; Joel Dison; Max Huber; Spike Slawson; Miles Peck
- Website: www.swinginutters.com

Swingin' Utters (often typeset as $wingin' Utter$, and originally called Johnny Peebucks and the Swingin' Utters) is a Californian punk rock band that formed in the late 1980s. After U.S. and European tours supporting the release of 2003's "Dead Flowers, Bottles, Bluegrass and Bones", some band members concentrated on raising their new families. From 2003-2010, the band played frequently, though mostly limited to the west coast of the United States and Canada, taking a break from any longer, comprehensive touring or recordings. During this time, they released the "Live in a Dive" double live album on Fat Wreck Chords (2004), and "Hatest Grits", a b-sides and rarities compilation (2008). After a seven-year gap in the release of any new, original recordings, the band released the "Brand New Lungs" 3-song 7-inch ep in 2010, followed by the "Here, Under Protest" LP (2011), and have since released four more records, and have resumed touring internationally.

== History ==
Johnny Peebucks and the Swingin' Utters began in Santa Cruz, California, later moving to San Francisco. The early lineup comprised singer Johnny "Peebucks" Bonnel, guitarist/multi-instrumentalist Darius Koski, bassist Kevin Wickersham, and drummer Greg McEntee. The band changed its name to the Swingin' Utters in 1994.

The band's 1995 album The Streets of San Francisco won them 'Best Debut Album' at the Bay Area Music Awards, and they were included on the first Vans Warped Tour.

They have been signed to Fat Wreck Chords since 1996, releasing A Juvenile Product of the Working Class that year and releasing seven original albums, two EP's, a rare/b-sides compilation, a best of compilation, several 7" singles, and a live record on the label since.

While Johnny Bonnel is the lead singer of the group, lead guitarist Darius Koski provides lead vocals on many of the band's tracks. Spike Slawson, Max Huber and Jack Dalrymple have also provided lead vocals on occasion.

The band toured the US with the Damned and Dropkick Murphys in the early 2000s. They also toured Europe with Rancid.

The band's track "The Lonely" was included in the Association for Independent Music (AFIM) Indie Award-winning soundtrack of the 2001 film That Darn Punk.

In 2010 a tribute album for the band, Untitled 21: A Juvenile Tribute to the Swingin' Utters, was released. After a seven-year gap in the release of any new, original recordings, the band returned in 2010 with the Brand New Lungs EP, and followed it with the album Here, Under Protest in 2011.

The band finished their second full-length since their return, Poorly Formed, which was released in early 2013. Longtime bassist Spike Slawson left the band in 2011, and was replaced by Miles Peck. Miles left the band in May 2017, and was replaced by Tony Teixeira.

In April 2013, the band toured Australia with Dropkick Murphys and Frank Turner. The band released the album Fistful of Hollow in 2014. It was the last album to see original/co-founding member and longtime drummer Greg McEntee, who left the band in April 2015. He was then replaced by Luke Ray. Johnny Bonnel and Darius Koski are the only remaining original members of the band.

Swingin' Utters toured with several other Fat Wreck alumni to support the celebration of the Fat Wreck Chords 25th Anniversary, in August 2015. The U.S. tour was followed by a show in Tokyo, Japan.

== Musical style ==
The band's sound is a traditional punk rock sound, and has been described as "street punk". CMJ New Music Report described their sound as "blue-collar pop-influenced punk". Comparisons have been drawn with early punk bands such as the Clash, Sham 69, the Sex Pistols, and Stiff Little Fingers. The band have also incorporated elements of country music and roots rock, with comparisons to band such as Dropkick Murphys and the Pogues. Bonnel cites early punk rock bands and Celtic music as his early influences. Darius Koski said of their music "I've always thought of [our] songs as just loud, aggressive and fast folk or country songs."

== Side projects ==
Members of the Swingin' Utters have been involved in many musical side projects, most notably Johnny Bonnel, Darius Koski, and Spike Slawson's Filthy Thievin' Bastards (formed in 2000). Druglords of the Avenues with Johnny Peebucks singing (formed in Oakland, California in 2004), and Spike Slawson's Me First and the Gimme Gimmes (in which he is the vocalist).

Drummer Greg McEntee also joined Viva Hate in February 2007, and the Re-Volts are fronted by Spike Slawson, with Darius Koski and Jack Dalrymple on guitar for their first record. Dalrymple was the former vocalist/guitarist for fellow Fat Wreck band Dead to Me as well. Jack also sings and plays guitar in two bands that are on Adeline Records: One Man Army, who briefly reunited after almost a decade of hiatus and released a new EP, and toyGuitar, in which Jack is joined by Miles Peck on guitar. A former Utters bandmate, Miles was also the lead singer and guitarist in Bay Area punk band the Sore Thumbs.

== Band members ==
Current members

- Johnny "Peebucks" Bonnel – lead vocals (1988–present)
- Darius Koski – guitars, vocals, accordion (1990–present)
- Jack Dalrymple – guitar, vocals (2006–present)
- Luke Ray – drums (2015–present)
- Tony Teixeira – bass (2017–present)

Former members

- Aric McKenna – guitar (1988–1990)
- Greg McEntee – drums (1988–2015)
- Joel Dison – guitar (1988–1992)
- Max Huber – guitar, vocals (1992–2002)
- Kevin Wickersham – bass (1988–1997)
- Spike Slawson – bass, vocals (1997–2012)
- Miles Peck – bass, vocals (2012–2017)

== Discography ==
=== Studio albums ===
- Scared (1992)
- The Streets of San Francisco (1995)
- A Juvenile Product of the Working Class (1996)
- Five Lessons Learned (1998)
- Swingin' Utters (2000) - CMJ No. 50
- Dead Flowers, Bottles, Bluegrass, and Bones (2003)
- Here, Under Protest (2011)
- Poorly Formed (2013)
- Fistful Of Hollow (2014)
- Peace and Love (2018)

=== Compilations ===
- More Scared: The House of Faith Years - 1996
- Hatest Grits: B-Sides And Bullshit - 2008
- Drowning in the Sea, Rising with the Sun - 2017

=== Live albums/EPs ===
- Live at the Fireside Bowl EP - 1996
- Live in a Dive - 2004

=== Singles/EPs ===
- Gives You Strength EP - 1992
- No Eager Men - 1993
- Nothing To Rely On - 1995
- The Sounds Wrong EP - 1995
- I Need Feedback - 1998
- Brazen Head E.P. - 1999
- Teen Idol Eyes - 1999
- "Fat Club" - 2001
- Brand New Lungs - 2010
- "Taking The Long Way" - 2010
- The Librarians Are Hiding Something - 2012
- Stuck in a Circle - 2013
- Sirens - 2020

=== Splits ===
- Swingin' Utters/Slip (split single with Slip) - 1994
- Swingin' Utters/UK Subs (split with UK Subs) - 1995
- Bombing the Bay (split with AFI) - 1997
- BYO Split Series Volume II (split with Youth Brigade) - 1999
- Der Glorreiche 7" Klub#4 (split with Wham Bam Bodyslam) - 2012
- Swingin' Utters/Modern Action (split single) (Modern Action Records 2013)

=== Compilation appearances ===
- "Five Lessons Learned"- Tony Hawk's Pro Skater 2
- "Stupid Lullabies" - Dave Mirra Freestyle BMX
- "Eddie's Teddy" - The Rocky Horror Punk Rock Show
- "The Lonely" - That Darn Punk
- "Dirty sea"- Keep the Beat, Hairball 8 records - 1996
- "Reggae Gets Big In A Small Town" - Mighty Attack - 1999
- "Back to You" - Short Music for Short People - 1999
- "Teenage Genocide" - Hardcore Breakout USA 1,2,3,... - 2004
- "Not Your Savior" - The Songs of Tony Sly: A Tribute - 2013

=== DVD ===
- Live at the Bottom of the Hill (2003)
