= Dead to Me (band) =

American punk rock band

- Origin: San Francisco, California, U.S.
- Genre: Punk rock
- Years active: 2003–2013, 2015–present
- Label: Fat Wreck Chords
- Members: Tyson Annicharico; Isa Anderson; Ken Yamazaki; Nathan Grice; Jack Dalyrmple
- Past members: Brandon Pollack; Sam Johnson
- Website: DeadToMeSF.com

Dead to Me is an American punk rock band from San Francisco, California, United States, founded by vocalist/guitarist Jack Dalrymple, drummer Brandon Pollack (both from the band One Man Army) and bassist/vocalist Chicken of Western Addiction. Early on, Pollack was replaced by Chicken's cousin Isa Anderson on drums and Nathan Grice joined as a second guitarist.

Shortly after the band's second release "Little Brother", Dalrymple left the band to focus on raising his newborn child and to make a full-time commitment as a member of the Swingin' Utters. Guitarist Nathan Grice took over Jack's vocal duties in his absence.

After touring and recording as a three-piece for about two years, guitarist Nathan Grice left the band. He was replaced by guitarist/vocalist Sam Johnson (of VRGNS, New Mexican Disaster Squad), and guitarist Ken Yamazaki, formerly of Enemy You and Western Addiction. In late 2014, the band tweeted that Jack Dalrymple had returned to the band, thus making the group a 5-piece. As of early 2015 the band entered the studio and pulled together songs that later formed I Wanna Die in Los Angeles (2016). This marked the first release of new music in five years, since Moscow Penny Ante.

In September 2024, a new unreleased song called "Don't Be Mad" was included as part of the "20 Years of Dreaming and Scheming" compilation published by Red Scare Industries.

== Discography ==
=== Studio albums ===
- Cuban Ballerina (2006)
- African Elephants (2009)
- Moscow Penny Ante (2011)

=== EPs ===
- Little Brother (2008)
- I Wanna Die in Los Angeles, 7" (2016)

=== Singles ===
- Dead to Me/Matter(12) Half a Pleasure… (2009)
- Wait for It... Wait for It!! (2010)
- Split 7" w/ Riverboat Gamblers & Off With Their Heads (2011)
- Split 7" w/ The Flatliners- Under the Influence Vol. 16 (2011)
- Fear Is the New Bliss (2018)
- Would It Kill You? (2018)

=== Music videos ===
- "Special Professional" (2006)
- "A Day Without A War" (2010)
- "The Hand with Inherited Rings" (2012)
- "Fear is the New Bliss" (2018)
- "Would It Kill You?" (2018)
