= Adeline Records =

American record label

- Parent company: Warner Music Group
- Founded: 1997; 29 years ago
- Founder: Billie Joe Armstrong; Jason White; Doug Sangalang; Jim Thiebaud
- Defunct: August 1, 2017; 8 years ago
- Status: Defunct
- Distributors: Warner Bros. Records (In the U.S.); East West Records (U.K.); WEA International (outside U.S.)
- Genre: Punk rock; pop-punk; alternative rock
- Country of origin: U.S.
- Location: San Diego, California
- Official website: www.adelinerecords.net

Adeline Records was an American record label that was formed in Oakland, California, in late 1997 and closed in August 2017.

== History ==
In 1997, Adeline Records was founded by Billie Joe Armstrong, lead singer of Green Day, Screw 32's Doug Sangalang, Green Day touring guitarist Jason White, and professional skateboarder Jim Thiebaud. It was named after a street (Adeline Street) that runs from The Port of Oakland through West Oakland and Emeryville, terminating at Ward St and Shattuck Ave in Berkeley.

Green Day's management company, Pat Magnarella Management, took over ownership of the label and ran it from the company's office in San Diego for many years.

The label was closed in 2017. In July 2017, Pat Magnarella split from Green Day, having managed them for over 21 years.

== Bands ==
- The Frustrators
- Green Day (vinyl releases only)
- Stickup Kid
- Jesse Malin
- Living with Lions
- Look Mexico
- One Time Angels
- One Man Army
- Pinhead Gunpowder
- Timmy Curran
- White Wives
- AFI
- Agent 51
- Broadway Calls
- Fetish
- Fleshies
- The Frisk
- The Hours
- The Influents
- The Living End
- The Network
- The Soviettes
- The Thumbs
- Emily's Army

== See also ==
- List of record labels
