= Johnny Bonnel =

American singer-songwriter (born 1967)

- Also known as: Johnny Peebucks
- Born: John Albert Bonnel; August 7, 1967 (age 58)
- Origin: California
- Genres: Punk rock
- Instrument: Vocals

Johnny "Peebucks" Bonnel (born August 7, 1967) is the lead singer and a songwriter of the punk rock band Swingin' Utters and the alternative punk rock band Filthy Thievin' Bastards. His new project is called Druglords of the Avenues.

His nickname, Johnny Peebucks, came from an incident at a party where he became so inebriated that he lost control of his bladder. He later went to Taco Bell with some friends, and paid for his food using wet dollar bills. After the cashier inquired as to whether Johnny had just been swimming, he replied "No, I pissed my pants." The nickname came from the composite of the slang words pee and bucks, colloquialisms for urination and money respectively.
