= NOFX discography =

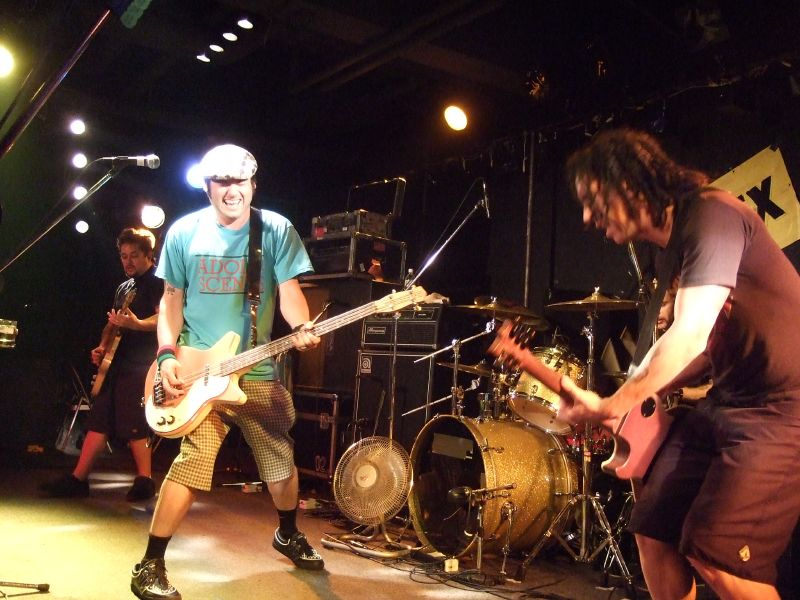
- NOFX performing live in 2007
- Studio albums: 15
- Extended plays: 17
- Soundtrack albums: 1
- Live albums: 3
- Compilation albums: 4
- Singles: 14
- Video albums: 3
- Music videos: 14
- Split albums: 3

This is a discography of NOFX, a California-based punk rock band. The band was formed in 1983 by vocalist and bassist Fat Mike, and guitarist Eric Melvin, drummer Erik Sandin joined them shortly afterwards. Their current second guitarist is El Hefe, who has been with the band since 1991. NOFX officially retired in 2024.

To date, NOFX has released 15 studio full lengths, 17 EPs, and many 7" singles. The band rose to popularity in 1994 with their album Punk in Drublic, which was their only album to obtain gold status in the United States.

== Albums ==
=== Studio albums ===
| Year | Album details | Chart peaks | | | | | | | | | | Certifications (sales thresholds) |
| Year | Album details | US | US Ind. | AUS | AUT | CAN | FRA | GER | SWE | SWI | UK | Certifications (sales thresholds) |
|---|---|---|---|---|---|---|---|---|---|---|---|---|
| 1988 | Liberal Animation: Released: April 22, 1988; Label: Wassail | — | — | — | — | — | — | — | — | — | — | |
| 1989 | S&M Airlines: Released: September 5, 1989; Label: Epitaph | — | — | — | — | — | — | — | — | — | — | |
| 1991 | Ribbed: Released: March 26, 1991; Label: Epitaph | — | — | — | — | — | — | — | — | — | — | |
| 1992 | White Trash, Two Heebs and a Bean: Released: November 5, 1992; Label: Epitaph | — | — | — | — | — | — | — | — | — | — | |
| 1994 | Punk in Drublic: Released: July 19, 1994; Label: Epitaph | — | — | 167 | — | — | — | 72 | — | — | — | RIAA: Gold; MC: Gold |
| 1996 | Heavy Petting Zoo: Released: January 31, 1996; Label: Epitaph | 63 | — | 57 | 20 | 31 | — | 40 | 13 | — | 60 | |
| 1997 | So Long and Thanks for All the Shoes: Released: October 21, 1997; Label: Epitaph | 79 | — | 93 | — | 54 | 51 | 49 | — | — | 128 | MC: Gold |
| 2000 | Pump Up the Valuum: Released: June 13, 2000; Label: Epitaph | 61 | 3 | 19 | — | 53 | 44 | 64 | — | 91 | 50 | |
| 2003 | The War on Errorism: Released: May 6, 2003; Label: Fat Wreck Chords | 44 | 1 | 29 | 46 | 26 | 81 | 27 | — | 25 | 48 | |
| 2006 | Wolves in Wolves' Clothing: Released: April 18, 2006; Label: Fat Wreck Chords | 46 | 2 | 23 | 46 | 19 | 150 | 60 | — | 56 | 119 | |
| 2009 | Coaster: Released: April 28, 2009; Label: Fat Wreck Chords | 36 | 4 | 24 | — | 29 | 176 | 50 | — | 100 | — | |
| 2012 | Self Entitled: Released: September 11, 2012; Label: Fat Wreck Chords | 42 | 10 | 51 | 48 | 25 | — | 60 | — | 79 | — | |
| 2016 | First Ditch Effort: Released: October 7, 2016; Label: Fat Wreck Chords | 54 | 12 | 27 | 28 | 23 | — | 16 | — | 33 | — | |
| 2021 | Single Album: Released: February 26, 2021; Label: Fat Wreck Chords | 152 | 26 | 25 | — | — | — | 19 | — | 34 | — | |
| 2022 | Double Album: Released: December 2, 2022; Label: Fat Wreck Chords | — | — | — | — | — | — | 86 | — | — | — | |
"—" denotes a release that did not chart.

=== Live albums ===
| Year | Album details | Chart peaks | | | | | |
| Year | Album details | US | US Ind. | AUS | FIN | GER | SWE |
|---|---|---|---|---|---|---|---|
| 1995 | I Heard They Suck Live!!: Released: August 22, 1995; Label: Fat Wreck Chords | 198 | — | 184 | 27 | 62 | 34 |
| 2007 | They've Actually Gotten Worse Live!: Released: November 20, 2007; Label: Fat Wreck Chords | — | 40 | — | — | — | — |
| 2018 | Ribbed: Live in a Dive: Released: August 3, 2018; Label: Fat Wreck Chords | — | — | — | — | — | — |
"—" denotes a release that did not chart.

=== Compilation albums ===
| Year | Album details | Chart peaks | | | | | | | |
| Year | Album details | US | US Ind. | AUS | AUT | CAN Alt. | GER | SWI | UK |
|---|---|---|---|---|---|---|---|---|---|
| 1988 | The Album: Released: 1988; Label: Mystic | — | — | — | — | — | — | — | — |
| 1989 | Maximum RocknRoll: Released: 1989 (as E Is for Everything); Re-released: January 1, 1992 (as Maximum RocknRoll); Label: Mystic | — | — | — | — | — | — | — | — |
| 2002 | 45 or 46 Songs That Weren't Good; Enough to Go on Our Other Records: Released: May 21, 2002; Label: Fat Wreck Chords | 80 | 4 | 26 | 57 | 16 | 89 | 97 | 77 |
| 2004 | The Greatest Songs Ever Written (By Us!): Released: November 9, 2004; Label: Epitaph | — | 26 | 98 | — | — | — | — | — |
| 2010 | The Longest EP: Released: August 17, 2010; Label: Fat Wreck Chords | — | 33 | — | — | — | — | — | — |
| 2014 | Backstage Passport Soundtrack: Released: December 9, 2014; Label: Fat Wreck Chords | — | — | — | — | — | — | — | — |
| 2025 | A to H: Released: December 5, 2025; Label: Fat Wreck Chords | — | — | — | — | — | — | — | — |
"—" denotes a release that did not chart.

=== Soundtrack albums ===
| Year | Album details | Chart peaks | |
| Year | Album details | AUS | GER |
|---|---|---|---|
| 2026 | 40 Years of Fuckin' Up: Soundtrack + Score: Released: August 28, 2026; Label: Fat Wreck Chords | 68 | 49 |

=== Split albums ===
| Year | Album details | Chart peaks |
| Year | Album details | GER |
|---|---|---|
| 1988 | Drowning Roses / NOFX: Released: 1988; Label: X-Mist | — |
| 2002 | BYO Split Series, Vol. 3: Released: March 5, 2002; Label: BYO | — |
| 2010 | NOFX / The Spits: Released: November 23, 2010; Label: Fat Wreck Chords | — |
| 2020 | West Coast vs. Wessex (with Frank Turner): Released: July 31, 2020; Label: Fat Wreck Chords | 42 |

=== Video albums ===
| Year | Album details |
|---|---|
| 1994 | Ten Years of Fuckin' Up: Released: November 8, 1994; Label: Fat Wreck Chords |
| 2009 | NOFX: Backstage Passport: Released: March 17, 2009; Label: Fat Wreck Chords |
| 2012 | The Decline Live DVD: Released: September 12, 2012; Label: Fat Wreck Chords |
| 2015 | NOFX: Backstage Passport 2: Released: August 21, 2015; Label: Fat Wreck Chords |

== EPs ==
| Year | EP details | Chart peaks | | |
| Year | EP details | US | US Ind. | AUS |
|---|---|---|---|---|
| 1985 | NOFX: Released: January 1, 1985; Label: Mystic | — | — | — |
| 1986 | So What If We're on Mystic!: Released: 1986; Label: Mystic | — | — | — |
| 1987 | The P.M.R.C. Can Suck on This: Released: 1987; Label: Wassail | — | — | — |
| 1992 | The Longest Line: Released: May 1, 1992; Label: Fat Wreck Chords | — | — | — |
| 1995 | HOFX: Released: June 19, 1995; Label: Fat Wreck Chords | — | — | — |
| 1996 | Fuck the Kids: Released: August 26, 1996; Label: Fat Wreck Chords | — | — | — |
| 1999 | Timmy the Turtle: Released: May 18, 1999; Label: Fat Wreck Chords | — | — | — |
| 1999 | The Decline: Released: November 23, 1999; Label: Fat Wreck Chords | 200 | — | 118 |
| 2001 | Surfer: Released: April 10, 2001; Label: Fat Wreck Chords | — | — | — |
| 2003 | Regaining Unconsciousness: Released: March 25, 2003; Label: Fat Wreck Chords | 187 | 10 | 81 |
| 2005 | 7" of the Month Club: Released: February 2005 – March 2006; Label: Fat Wreck Chords | — | — | — |
| 2006 | Never Trust a Hippy: Released: March 14, 2006; Label: Fat Wreck Chords | 186 | 12 | 117 |
| 2009 | The Myspace Transmissions, Vol. 11: Released: April 8, 2009; Label: N/A | — | — | — |
| 2009 | Cokie the Clown: Released: November 2009; Label: Fat Wreck Chords | — | 39 | — |
| 2011 | NOFX: Released: August 2, 2011; Label: Fat Wreck Chords | — | — | — |
| 2013 | Stoke Extinguisher: Released: November 26, 2013; Label: Fat Wreck Chords | — | — | — |
| 2016 | Hepatitis Bathtub: Released: December 16, 2016; Label: Fat Wreck Chords | — | — | — |
| 2024 | Half Album: Released April 19, 2024; Label: Fat Wreck Chords | — | — | — |
"—" denotes a release that did not chart.

== Singles ==
| Year | Details | Chart peaks | |
| Year | Details | UK | AUS |
|---|---|---|---|
| 1992 | "Liza and Louise": Released: November 16, 1992; Label: Fat Wreck Chords | — | — |
| 1994 | "Don't Call Me White": Released: August 26, 1994; Label: Epitaph | — | — |
| 1995 | "Leave It Alone": Released: 1995; Label: Epitaph | — | — |
| 1996 | "All of Me": Released: 1996; Label: Fat Wreck Chords | — | — |
| 1999 | "Louise and Liza": Released: August 24, 1999; Label: Fat Wreck Chords | — | — |
| 2000 | "Pods and Gods": Released: May 30, 2000; Label: Fat Wreck Chords | — | — |
| 2000 | "Bottles to the Ground": Released: November 21, 2000; Label: Epitaph | 142 | 176 |
| 2001 | "Fat Club": Released: 2001; Label: Fat Wreck Chords | — | — |
| 2003 | "13 Stitches": Released: 2003; Label: Fat Wreck Chords | — | — |
| 2012 | "My Stepdad's a Cop and My Stepmom's a Domme": Released: June 19, 2012; Label: Fat Wreck Chords | — | — |
| 2012 | "Ronnie and Mags": Released: August 14, 2012; Label: Fat Wreck Chords | — | — |
| 2013 | "Xmas Has Been X'ed/New Year's Revolution": Released: January 15, 2013; Label: Fat Wreck Chords | — | — |
| 2019 | "Fish in a Gun Barrel": Released: August 16, 2019; Label: Fat Wreck Chords | — | — |
| 2021 | Linewleum: Released: January 12, 2021; Label: Fat Wreck Chords | — | — |
| 2025 | "Barcelona": Released: July 9, 2025; Label: Fat Wreck Chords | — | — |
| 2026 | "Minnesota Nazis": Released: January 29, 2026; Label: Hopeless Records Inc | — | — |
| 2026 | "40 Years Of Fuckin Up" • Released: May 21, 2026 • Label: Fat Wreck Chords | — | — |
"—" denotes a release that did not chart.

== Music videos ==
| Year | Song | Director | Song from | Video appears on |
|---|---|---|---|---|
| 1988 | "Shut Up Already" | | Liberal Animation | Ten Years of Fuckin' Up |
| 1988 | "Mr Jones" | | Liberal Animation | Ten Years of Fuckin' Up |
| 1989 | "S&M Airlines" | Gore Verbinski | S&M Airlines | Ten Years of Fuckin' Up |
| 1993 | "Bob" | Samuel Bayer | White Trash, Two Heebs and a Bean | Ten Years of Fuckin' Up |
| 1993 | "Stickin' In My Eye" | Issac Camner | White Trash, Two Heebs and a Bean | Punk-O-Rama: The Videos, Volume 1 |
| 1994 | "Leave It Alone" | Geoff Moore | Punk in Drublic | Punk-O-Rama: The Videos, Volume 1 |
| 1996 | "I Wanna Be an Alcoholic" | NOFX | N/A (later released on The Longest EP) | Peepshow DVD |
| 2003 | "Franco Un-American" | John Taylor | The War on Errorism | Peepshow III |
| 2006 | "Seeing Double at the Triple Rock" | Justin Staggs | Wolves in Wolves' Clothing | |
| 2009 | "Cokie the Clown" | | Cokie the Clown | |
| 2010 | "Everything in Moderation (Especially Moderation)" | | The Longest E.P. | |
| 2012 | "Xmas Has Been X'ed" | Ryan Harlin | Self-Entitled | |
| 2016 | "Six Years On Dope" | Moca | First Ditch Effort | |
| 2016 | "Oxy Moronic" | Brad Schulz | First Ditch Effort | Funny or Die |
| 2020 | "I Love You More Than I Hate Me" | Chris Graue | Single Album | |
| 2021 | "Linewleum" | | Single Album | |
| 2021 | "Linewleum" | | Single Album | |
| 2021 | "The Big Drag" | Olga & Vira "MadTwins" Ishchuk | Single Album | |
| 2023 | "Darby Crashing Your Party" | | Double Album | |
