= The Greatest Songs Ever Written (By Us) =

Greatest hits album by NOFX
- Released: November 9, 2004
- Recorded: 1989–2004
- Genre: Punk rock
- Length: 61:24
- Label: Epitaph
- Producers: Brett Gurewitz, Donnell Cameron, Ryan Greene

NOFX chronology
The War on Errorism (2003)	The Greatest Songs Ever Written (By Us) (2004)	Never Trust a Hippy (2006)

Professional ratings
Review scores
Source	Rating
AllMusic	link
Blender	link
IGN	7.5/10

The Greatest Songs Ever Written (By Us) is a greatest hits compilation album released on November 9, 2004, by NOFX consisting of previously released songs (other than "Murder the Government" and "Wore Out the Soles of My Party Boots") that have been cleaned up and restored using a more recent technology. Some songs were even re-mixed for the compilation.

A poster of the record is featured in the 2006 stoner comedy Grandma's Boy.

== Track listing ==
All songs written by Fat Mike.

1. "Dinosaurs Will Die" (Pump Up the Valuum)
2. "Linoleum" (Punk in Drublic)
3. "Bob" (White Trash, Two Heebs and a Bean)
4. "The Separation of Church and Skate" (The War on Errorism)
5. "Murder the Government" (So Long and Thanks for All the Shoes)
6. "Bleeding Heart Disease" (Heavy Petting Zoo)
7. "Bottles to the Ground" (Pump Up The Valuum)
8. "180 Degrees" (So Long and Thanks for All the Shoes)
9. "Party Enema" (Surfer EP)
10. "What's the Matter With Kids Today" (Heavy Petting Zoo)
11. "Reeko" (Punk in Drublic)
12. "Stickin In My Eye" (White Trash, Two Heebs and a Bean)
13. "All Outta Angst" (So Long and Thanks for All the Shoes)
14. "Leave It Alone" (Punk in Drublic)
15. "Green Corn" (Ribbed)
16. "The Longest Line" (The Longest Line EP)
17. "Thank God It's Monday" (Pump Up The Valuum)
18. "The Idiots Are Taking Over" (The War On Errorism)
19. "Don't Call Me White" (Punk in Drublic)
20. "Day To Daze" (S&M Airlines)
21. "Soul Doubt" (White Trash, Two Heebs and a Bean)
22. "Philthy Phil Philanthropist" (Heavy Petting Zoo)
23. "Shut Up Already" (Liberal Animation)
24. "It's My Job to Keep Punk Rock Elite" (So Long and Thanks for All the Shoes)
25. "Franco Un-American" (The War On Errorism)
26. "Kill All The White Man" (The Longest Line EP)
27. "Wore Out The Soles Of My Party Boots" (previously unreleased)

== Notes ==
- The song "Murder the Government" is the LP version, different from the one on the CD version of So Long and Thanks For All the Shoes and also different from the version on Fuck the Kids (which also appeared on 45 or 46 Songs That Weren't Good Enough to Go on Our Other Records).
- The song "180 Degrees" is also the LP version, different from the one on the CD version of So Long and Thanks For All the Shoes.

== Personnel ==
- Fat Mike – bass, vocals, keyboards
- El Hefe – guitar, trumpet, vocals (tracks 1–14, 16-19 and 21–22, 24–27)
- Eric Melvin – guitar, vocals
- Erik Sandin – drums, percussion
- Steve Kidwiler – guitar, vocals (tracks 15 and 20)
- Dave Casillas – guitar (track 23)
- Bryan Wynacht – cover pool photography

== Charts ==
Chart performance for The Greatest Songs Ever Written (By Us)
Chart (2004)	Peak position
Australian Albums (ARIA)	98
US Independent Albums (Billboard)	26
