= They've Actually Gotten Worse Live! =

Live album by NOFX
- Released: November 20, 2007
- Recorded: January 30 – February 1, 2007
- Genre: Punk rock
- Length: 59:11
- Label: Fat Wreck Chords
- Producer: Jamie McMann (Recording Engineer and Mixer)

NOFX chronology
Wolves in Wolves' Clothing (2006)	They've Actually Gotten Worse Live! (2007)	Coaster (2009)

They've Actually Gotten Worse Live! is a live album by punk rock band NOFX. The album is their second live recording, following their 1995 album I Heard They Suck Live!!

On September 26, 2007, the band posted a bulletin from their MySpace profile with the following regarding the album:

"Ever done something you regret while drunk? I know, I know… so embarrassing right? Ever woken up and rubbed your pounding skull and said, “What did I do last night?” Oh man…you should have seen yourself… first… you got totally blitzed and then… then… this is the best part… YOU RECORDED A LIVE RECORD! That’s right, back in January, NOFX booked 3 nights of talking mixed with the occasional song at Slim’s in San Francisco and recorded a live record. It’s their sloppiest, drunkest, funniest, best sounding recording ever with new versions of old songs, rare songs and they even made sure not to play any songs off their 1995 live album I Heard They Suck Live!!. They’ve Actually Gotten Worse Live is scheduled to make the walk of shame into record stores sometime in November."

On October 3, 2007 the band released the track listing for the album, which includes rarities and alternate versions of previously released songs. On November 12, the band released previews of two songs, "You're Wrong" and "Lori Meyers," for download on their MySpace profile.

== Lyrical changes ==
- In "Franco Un-American", Fat Mike replaces "Public Enemy and Reagan Youth" with "The Dead Kennedys and Wasted Youth."
- Also in "Franco Un-American", Fat Mike adds an extra verse over the bridge, directly criticizing George W. Bush. The verse is similar to the verse he sang when the band played the song on Late Night with Conan O'Brien. The verse added in this song is as follows, "We all know George Bush is an imbecile, he loves Dick, but he hates homosexuals. I'm sick and tired, of the embarrassment, the whole world wants us to kill our fucking (scratch)."
- In "What's The Matter With Parents Today?", Fat Mike changes the line "having sex publicly" to "having sex anally." The line "I thought the apple fell far from the tree" is changed to "The asshole fell far from the tree," and "On the couch, with my Misfits records out" is changed to "On the lawn, with My Chemical Romance on."
- The lyrics to "New Happy Birthday Song?" were almost completely different, due to Fat Mike dedicating the song, along with its newly disparaging remarks, to a woman in the audience who very loudly wished herself a happy birthday.
- The intro to "Murder the Government" was modified to make disparaging references to Dick Cheney, and Jenna, Barbara, and George W. Bush.
- The last few lines of "The Longest Line" are changed to "Do you have the time/To listen to me whine?", a line from Green Day's "Basket Case" which has a similar chord progression.
- In "Whoops I OD'd," the line "Assholes like to test the limit" is changed to "Golfers like to test the limit" in reference to an incident where a friend of the band's OD'd on a golf course on the morning of the show.
- "The Longest Line" verse "This world is much too dangerous for someone lacking luck like me" changed to "This world is much too dangerous for someone who's as drunk as me"

== Reception ==
Professional ratings
Review scores
Source	Rating
Crawdaddy!	(favorable)
Punknews.org	3/5 stars

The album received generally good reviews that praised the band's humorous performance. However, the album was universally criticized for fading out "The Decline" instead of playing the whole song.

== Track listing ==
This is the track listing as printed on the disc, but actually on the cover "Instant Crassic" and "See Her Pee" are on changed positions (12/14).

All tracks are written by NOFX.

No.	Title	Originally appeared on	Length
1.	"Intro/Glass War"	13 Stitches single	4:39
2.	"You're Wrong"	Never Trust A Hippy EP	2:53
3.	"Franco Un-American"	War On Errorism	3:19
4.	"Scavenger Type"	Punk In Drublic	2:50
5.	"What's the Matter With Parents Today?"	Pods and Gods, Pump Up The Valuum	2:27
6.	"The Longest Line"	The Longest Line EP	2:34
7.	"New Happy Birthday Song?"	Surfer EP	1:14
8.	"Eat the Meek"	So Long and Thanks for All the Shoes	4:01
9.	"Murder the Government"	Fuck the Kids, So Long and Thanks for All the Shoes	1:12
10.	"Monosyllabic Girl"	So Long and Thanks for All the Shoes	0:52
11.	"I'm Telling Tim"	Fuck the Kids, So Long and Thanks for All the Shoes	1:08
12.	"Instant Crassic"	Wolves in Wolves' Clothing	0:40
13.	"Can't Get the Stink Out"	Surfer	0:50
14.	"See Her Pee"	Short Music For Short People	0:29
15.	"I Wanna Be an Alcoholic"	Peepshow (Video)	0:23
16.	"Fuck the Kids"	Surfer	0:20
17.	"Juice Head"	Surfer	0:58
18.	"What Now My Love" (originally titled "What Now Herb?")	7" of the Month Club (September)	3:35
19.	"Lori Meyers" (with Sarah Sandin on vocals)	Punk in Drublic	3:30
20.	"We March to the Beat of Indifferent Drum"	Wolves in Wolves' Clothing	5:40
21.	"I, Melvin" (with Matt Hensley of Flogging Molly on accordion)	7" of the Month Club (October)	3:10
22.	"Green Corn"	Ribbed	2:55
23.	"Whoops I OD'd"	War On Errorism	3:10
24.	"Stickin in My Eye/The Decline" (faded out)	White Trash, Two Heebs and a Bean, The Decline EP	6:09

== Personnel ==
NOFX

- Fat Mike - bass, vocals
- El Hefe - guitar, vocals, trumpet, trombone
- Eric Melvin - guitar, vocals
- Erik Sandin - drums, percussion

Additional musicians

- Matt Hensley - accordion on "I, Melvin"
- Sarah Sandin - additional vocals on "Lori Meyers"
- Limo - keyboards
