= The Longest EP =

Compilation album by NOFX
- Released: August 17, 2010
- Recorded: 1987–2009
- Genre: Punk rock
- Length: 1:05:26
- Label: Fat Wreck Chords
- Producer: Various

NOFX chronology
Cokie the Clown (2009)	The Longest EP (2010)	NOFX / The Spits (2010)

The Longest EP is a compilation album by the American punk rock band NOFX, which was released on August 17, 2010. Despite the title, it is not actually an EP; it is a compilation of songs from 1987 to 2009, plus rarities, out of print material and previously unreleased outtakes. The Longest EP has been referred to as a "sequel" to NOFX's 2002 compilation album 45 or 46 Songs That Weren't Good Enough to Go on Our Other Records. Upon release of The Longest EP, "the other EP's" by NOFX will go out of print.

The artwork and design for the album was done by the "same dude that illustrated the cover of The Longest Line."

== Track listing ==
All tracks are written by NOFX.

No.	Title	Original release (Year)	Length
1.	"The Death of John Smith"	The Longest Line (1992)	3:51
2.	"The Longest Line"	The Longest Line (1992)	2:04
3.	"Stranded"	The Longest Line (1992)	2:09
4.	"Remnants"	The Longest Line (1992)	2:58
5.	"Kill All the White Man"	The Longest Line (1992)	2:48
6.	"I Wanna Be an Alcoholic"	Previously unreleased, Outtake from the Fuck the Kids EP (1996)	0:31
7.	"Perverted"	Previously unreleased, Outtake from the Fuck the Kids EP (1996)	1:04
8.	"My Name is Bud"	Bottles to the Ground (2000)	0:51
9.	"Hardcore 84"	Regaining Unconsciousness (2003)	1:56
10.	"War on Errorism Commercial"	Regaining Unconsciousness (2003)	2:04
11.	"13 Stitches" (Acoustic)	13 Stitches (2003)	1:54
12.	"Glass War"	13 Stitches (2003)	1:58
13.	"Jaw Knee Music"	Rock Against Bush, Vol. 1 (2004) Outtake from The War On Errorism (2003)	2:31
14.	"Concerns of a GOP Neophyte"	Take Action, Vol. 4 (2004) Outtake from The War On Errorism (2003)	2:23
15.	"Golden Boys" (Vagina Dentata cover)	Never Trust a Hippy (2006)	2:47
16.	"You're Wrong"	Never Trust a Hippy (2006)	2:06
17.	"Everything in Moderation (Especially Moderation)"	Never Trust a Hippy (2006)	1:23
18.	"I'm Going to Hell for This One"	Never Trust a Hippy (2006)	1:53
19.	"I've Become a Cliché"	Coaster bonus track (2009)	3:13
20.	"Cokie the Clown"	Cokie the Clown (2009)	2:26
21.	"Straight Outta Massachusetts"	Cokie the Clown (2009)	1:16
22.	"Fermented and Flailing"	Cokie the Clown (2009)	2:40
23.	"Codependence Day"	Cokie the Clown (2009)	1:28
24.	"My Orphan Year" (Acoustic)	Cokie the Clown (2009)	2:58
25.	"S&M Airlines" (7" version)	NOFX/Drowning Roses split (1988)	4:30
26.	"Dueling Retards"	The P.M.R.C. Can Suck on This (1987)	0:47
27.	"On the Rag"	The P.M.R.C. Can Suck on This (1987)	1:53
28.	"A200 Club"	The P.M.R.C. Can Suck on This (1987)	2:02
29.	"Shut Up Already"	The P.M.R.C. Can Suck on This (1987)	2:29
30.	"The Punk Song (contains Johnny B. Goode as an hidden track)"	The P.M.R.C. Can Suck on This (1987)	2:47

== Personnel ==
- Fat Mike – vocals, bass
- Eric Melvin – guitar, vocals
- El Hefe – guitar, vocals (tracks 1–24)
- Erik Sandin – drums
- Dave Casillas – guitar (tracks 25–30)
