= NOFX / The Spits =

EP by NOFX and The Spits
- Released: November 23, 2010
- Genre: Punk rock
- Length: 6:48
- Label: Fat Wreck Chords

NOFX chronology
The Longest EP (2010)	NOFX / The Spits (2010)	NOFX (2011)

NOFX / The Spits is a split EP between punk bands NOFX and The Spits. It was released on November 23, 2010 on vinyl only but is now available for digital download.

== Track listing ==
All music is composed by NOFX and The Spits.

No.	Title	Length
1.	"Hold It Back" (NOFX)	1:12
2.	"Teenage Existentialist" (NOFX)	2:24
3.	"Wait" (The Spits)	1:20
4.	"Get Our Kicks" (The Spits)	1:52
Total length:		6:48

== Personnel ==
NOFX

- Fat Mike – vocals, bass on tracks 1 and 2
- Eric Melvin – guitar, vocals on tracks 1 and 2
- El Hefe – guitar, vocals on tracks 1 and 2
- Erik Sandin – drums on tracks 1 and 2

The Spits

- Sean Wood — guitar and vocals on tracks 3 and 4
- Erin Wood — bass and vocals on tracks 3 and 4
- Lance Phelps — drums on tracks 3 and 4
- Gregory Toumassian— Keyboard on tracks 3 and 4
