= Bottles to the Ground =

EP by NOFX
- Released: November 21, 2000
- Genre: Punk rock
- Label: Epitaph Records

NOFX chronology
Pods and Gods (2000)	Bottles to the Ground (2000)	Fat Club 7 (2001)

Bottles to the Ground is a CD EP by NOFX. The first and last songs are from the full-length Pump Up the Valuum. "Lower" was originally slated for the album, but was dropped in favor of "Total Bummer." It was later included on 45 or 46 Songs That Weren't Good Enough to Go on Our Other Records.

"My Name Is Bud", which later appeared on The Longest EP, is a re-worked version of the song of the same name on the "Fuck the Kids" EP.

This record was limited to 40,000 copies.

== Track listing ==
1. "Bottles to the Ground"
2. "Lower"
3. "My Name Is Bud"
4. "Dinosaurs Will Die"
