= Hepatitis Bathtub =

EP by NOFX
- Released: December 23, 2016
- Recorded: Omaha, Nebraska in 1987
- Genre: Hardcore punk, punk rock
- Label: Fat Wreck Chords

NOFX chronology
First Ditch Effort (2016)	Hepatitis Bathtub (2016)	Ribbed: Live in a Dive (2018)

Hepatitis Bathtub is an EP by NOFX released on December 23, 2016 through Fat Wreck Chords. The EP was released as a four-song 7". The EP was recorded in a basement in Omaha, Nebraska in 1987 by Dereck Higgins (of Omaha punk band R.A.F.) and consists of never re-recorded songs of NOFX. It was also available as a deluxe package in limited edition color vinyl with a hardcover copy of NOFX's book The Hepatitis Bathtub and Other Stories and a NOFX towel. The Hepatitis Bathtub and Other Stories was eventually released in April 2016.

== Track listing ==
1. "Too Mixed Up"
2. "Nothing But a Nightmare" (Rudimentary Peni Cover)
3. "Young Drunk and Stupid"
4. "No Problems/Death of a Friend"

== Performers ==
- Erik Sandin - drums
- Dave Casillas - guitar
- Eric Melvin - guitar, vocals
- Fat Mike - vocals, bass
