= Hefe =

Hefe may refer to:

- Hefe (born 1965), singer a.k.a. Aaron Abeyta
- The German word for yeast. It is used to differentiate between unfiltered and filtered wheat beer in Germany (Weissbier), the unfiltered version being called "Hefe-Weizen", which may colloquially in the USA be shortened to Hefe.
