= 45 or 46 Songs That Weren't Good Enough to Go on Our Other Records =

Compilation album by NOFX
- Released: May 21, 2002
- Recorded: Various
- Genre: Skate punk, Punk rock
- Length: 70:06
- Label: Fat Wreck Chords
- Producer: Various

NOFX chronology
BYO Split Series Volume III (2002)	45 or 46 Songs That Weren't Good Enough to Go on Our Other Records (2002)	Regaining Unconsciousness (2003)

Professional ratings
Review scores
Source	Rating
AllMusic	4/5 stars
Alternative Press	7/10

45 or 46 Songs That Weren't Good Enough to Go on Our Other Records is a double album released in 2002 by NOFX. It was released through Fat Wreck Chords on May 21, 2002.

Over time, the band built up several songs that had not made it onto any of their albums, or had previously appeared on compilation albums, vinyl singles, or B-sides. Many of the songs had been dropped originally because of Fat Mike's tendency to not release albums that ran for too long.

The first CD contains a collection of songs spanning almost the entirety of the band's career. The oldest track is from the band's first demo, and the newest track was recorded for the album. The second CD contains the EPs Fuck the Kids and Surfer, each of which contain several short songs that were previously available only on 7" vinyl.

The vinyl release of the album was renamed to 22 Songs That Weren't Good Enough to Go on Our Other Records, but only included the first 21 tracks from the first CD, because tracks on the second CD were already available on the two vinyl EPs.

== Song information ==
Song	Recorded	Originally appeared on	Notes
Counting Sheep (CD disc one and vinyl release)
"Pimps and Hookers"	2002	N/A	The only track exclusive to this release.
"All of Me"	1996	All of Me 7" and Physical Fatness compilation album	A cover of a Tin Pan Alley standard whose best-known versions are by Billie Holiday, Louis Armstrong, and Willie Nelson. An outtake from the So Long and Thanks For All the Shoes recording sessions.
"We Threw Gasoline on the Fire and Now We Have Stumps for Arms and No Eyebrows"	1997	Punk-O-Rama Vol. 3 compilation album	
"Drugs Are Good"	1995	HOFX EP	An outtake from the Punk in Drublic recording sessions.
"Lower"	2000	Bottles to the Ground EP	An outtake from the Pump Up the Valuum recording sessions.
"Forming"	1996	A Small Circle of Friends: Germs (Tribute) compilation album	Originally performed by the Germs.
"Electricity"	1999	Before You Were Punk 2 compilation album	Originally performed by OMD. An outtake from the Pump Up The Valuum recording sessions.
"Lazy"	1997	Happy Meals, Volume 2 compilation album	Originally performed by Bracket. An outtake from the So Long and Thanks For All the Shoes recording sessions.
"The Plan"	1999	Timmy the Turtle 7" and Life in the Fat Lane compilation album	An outtake from the Pump Up The Valuum recording sessions.
"Timmy the Turtle"	1999	Timmy the Turtle 7"	Features guest vocals by Duncan Redmonds, best known for singing in UK punk band Snuff. An outtake from the So Long and Thanks For All the Shoes recording sessions.
"Punk Song"	1987	The P.M.R.C. Can Suck on This! EP.	
"See Her Pee"	1999	Short Music for Short People compilation album	
"Zyclone B Bathhouse"	1999	Fat Club 7"	An outtake from the Pump Up The Valuum recording sessions.
"Last Caress"	1996	Violent World compilation album	Originally performed by The Misfits.
"Bath of Least Resistance"	2000	Punk-O-Rama Vol. 6 compilation album	An outtake from the Pump Up The Valuum recording sessions, also featured on the hit dancing game DDR Ultramix 3.
"We Ain't Shit"	1995	HOFX EP.	An outtake from the Punk in Drublic recording sessions.
"San Francisco Fat"	2000	Live Fat, Die Young compilation album	An outtake from the Pump Up the Valuum recording sessions.
"Vincent"	1996	Survival of the Fattest compilation album	Originally performed by Don McLean. An outtake from the Heavy Petting Zoo recording sessions.
"Pump Up the Valium"	2000	Punk-O-Rama Vol. 5 compilation album	An outtake from the Pump Up The Valuum recording sessions. It would have been the title track, but it was left off the album in an homage to a similar move that DC punk band Scream did on their first record.
"Pods and Gods"	2000	Pods and Gods 7"	An outtake from the Pump Up The Valuum recording sessions.
"Eat the Meek (dub mix)"	1998	Wankin' In The Pit compilation album	Alternate mix of a song that appeared on So Long and Thanks for All the Shoes.
"Thalidomide Child"	1984	The band's first demo. Also appeared on the Devil Doll Records compilation Pogo, Strut, Slam, Swivel & Mosh.	This is a hidden track, as it is not listed on the outside front cover of the CD. Originally from their demo.
Catching Zzz's (CD disc two)
Tracks 1–13	2001	Surfer EP	The song "Three Shits To The Wind" wasn't included on this disc.
Tracks 14–25	1996	Fuck the Kids EP	The song "Stupid Canadians" wasn't included on this disc.

== Track listing ==
All tracks are written by Mike Burkett and/or NOFX, except where noted.

Disc One: Counting Sheep
No.	Title	Length
1.	"Pimps and Hookers"	2:13
2.	"All of Me" (Gerald Marks, Seymour Simons)	2:05
3.	"We Threw Gasoline......."	2:44
4.	"Drugs Are Good"	2:18
5.	"Lower"	2:47
6.	"Forming" (Bobby Pyn)	0:50
7.	"Electricity" (Paul Humphreys, Andy McCluskey)	2:06
8.	"Lazy" (Marty Gregori)	3:02
9.	"The Plan"	3:00
10.	"Timmy the Turtle"	1:39
11.	"Punk Song"	0:47
12.	"See Her Pee"	0:31
13.	"Zyclone B Bathouse"	1:37
14.	"Last Caress" (Glenn Danzig)	1:31
15.	"Bath of Least Resistance"	1:47
16.	"We Ain't Shit"	3:05
17.	"San Francisco Fat"	2:44
18.	"Vincent" (Don McLean)	3:21
19.	"Pump Up the Valium"	1:46
20.	"Pods and Gods"	2:57
21.	"Eat the Meek" (Dub Mix)	4:33
22.	"Thalidomide Child"	1:40

Disc Two: Catching Zzz's
No.	Title	Length
1.	"Fun Things to Fuck (If You're a Winner)"	1:05
2.	"Juice Head" (Traditional)	0:20
3.	"Three on Speed"	1:20
4.	"New Happy Birthday Song?"	0:44
5.	"Talking Bout Yo Mama"	0:32
6.	"Party Enema"	1:30
7.	"Can't Get the Stink Out"	1:07
8.	"Go to Work Wasted"	1:01
9.	"Fuck the Kids (Revisited)"	0:33
10.	"Whoa on the Whoas"	0:42
11.	"Puke on Cops"	0:59
12.	"I Gotta Pee"	0:32
13.	"Totally Fucked"	2:10
14.	"Fuck the Kids"	0:07
15.	"Fuck the Kids II"	0:05
16.	"I'm Telling Tim"	1:06
17.	"Reagan Sucks"	1:24
18.	"Posuer"	0:31
19.	"My Name's Bud"	0:54
20.	"Two on Glue"	1:09
21.	"Please Stop Fucking My Mom"	0:55
22.	"Murder the Government"	0:42
23.	"Stranger Than Fishin"	0:52
24.	"Eric Melvin vs. PCP"	0:37
25.	"Always Hate Hippies"	0:55

== Charts ==
Chart performance for 45 or 46 Songs That Weren't Good Enough to Go on Our Other Records
Chart (2002)	Peak position
Australian Albums (ARIA)	26
Austrian Albums (Ö3 Austria)	57
German Albums (Offizielle Top 100)	89
Swiss Albums (Schweizer Hitparade)	97
UK Albums (OCC)	77
US Billboard 200	80
US Independent Albums (Billboard)	4
