= HOFX =

EP by NOFX
- Released: June 19, 1995
- Genre: Punk rock
- Label: Fat Wreck Chords

NOFX chronology
I Heard They Suck Live!! (1995)	HOFX (1995)	Heavy Petting Zoo (1996)

"HOFX" is a 12" EP by NOFX that includes two songs from the Punk in Drublic period. Both songs later appeared on 45 or 46 Songs That Weren't Good Enough to Go on Our Other Records.

The record is limited to 8,300 copies with 1,000 on picture discs and the remaining 7,300 are randomly colored splatter.

The cover art is a photograph of the band with Don Ho in Hawaii.

== Track listing ==
All tracks are written by NOFX.

No.	Title	Length
1.	"We Ain't Shit"	3:05
2.	"Drugs Are Good"	2:18
