= The War on Errorism =

Studio album by NOFX
- Released: May 6, 2003
- Recorded: January–April 2003
- Studios: Motor Studios, San Francisco
- Genres: Punk rock; skate punk; ska punk
- Length: 36:16
- Label: Fat Wreck Chords
- Producers: Ryan Greene; Fat Mike

NOFX chronology
Regaining Unconsciousness (2003)	The War on Errorism (2003)	The Greatest Songs Ever Written (By Us!) (2004)

Alternative cover
- 2026 reissue cover

The War on Errorism is the ninth studio album by the American punk rock band NOFX. It was released on May 6, 2003, through Fat Wreck Chords.

The album was recorded in 2003 after they left Epitaph Records in 2001, following the release of 2000's Pump Up the Valuum.

== Background ==
In September 2002, after 13 weeks of continuous touring around the world, the band began writing material for their next album. On November 26, it was reported that NOFX left Epitaph Records, and were expecting to release their next album through Fat Wreck Chords, which was tentatively titled Our Second Best Album. On December 9, the album's title was changed to The War on Errorism.

Other songs recorded during this time, but not released on the album, are: "Jaw, Knee, Music", "One Way Ticket to Fuckneckville" (Keyboards version), "Glass War", "Idiot Son of an Asshole", "13 Stitches" (acoustic), "Hardcore 84".

== Composition ==
The album takes aim at U.S. President George W. Bush, criticizing him and his policies, while the cover features a cartoon version of the president as a clown. The back of the cover booklet and runout groove has a caption stating "Somewhere in Texas there is a village without its idiot". The 2026 reissue replaces Bush with Donald Trump, similarly critiquing his policies.

"Mattersville" was originally released on Fat Music Volume 6: Uncontrollable Fatulence. A few songs from The War on Errorism were included on the Regaining Unconsciousness EP, released earlier.

Canadian punk musician and NOFX fan Talli Osborne, who was born without arms and is missing some bones in her legs, is the subject of "She's Nubs".

== Release ==
On March 19, 2003, "Idiots Are Taking Over" was posted on the label's website, followed by the album's artwork two days later. NOFX released the Regaining Unconsciousness EP on March 25, 2003. The War on Errorism was released on May 6, 2003, through Fat Wreck Chords. The album was released as an Enhanced CD, and features an introduction from Fat Mike and Eric Melvin, an 8-minute trailer for the movie Unprecedented: The 2000 Presidential Election, a music video for "Franco Un-American", and a live video of the song "Idiot Son of an Asshole." In May and June, the band toured Europe as part of the Deconstruction Tour. On June 5, the band appeared on 54321. The band played a few US shows in March 2004, prior to touring the West Coast as part of the Punkvoter Tour. They then embarked on a tour of Europe in May 2004, with Swingin' Utters and the Epoxies. NOFX performed on Late Night with Conan O'Brien on August 10, 2004. The band was due to appear on the Warped Tour, until Mike and his wife were expecting a child in August 2004.

The song "Franco Un-American" was the first single, garnering some airplay on major radio stations in the United States. A music video was also made for the song.

== Reception ==
Professional ratings
Review scores
Source	Rating
AllMusic	4/5 stars
Robert Christgau	A−

In a review on AllMusic, reviewer Johnny Loftus wrote: "Musically, NOFX fuses its political cynicism with criticism of punk rock itself and suggests that the best thing for all the kids and the bands might be to close ranks and start their own little hardcore community. 'Irrationality of Rationality' and 'Franco Un-American'—two of the album's most melodic, catchy songs—are also two of War on Errorism's most biting commentaries. The first personalizes the trickle-down effect of corporate decision-making over a lockstep hardcore rhythm; the second gets all-new wavy as Fat Mike reasons out his own world view, and somehow rhymes "apathy" with "Noam Chomsky.'"

The album reached the No. 1 position on Billboard's Independent Albums chart, as well as No. 44 in the Billboard Top 200.

== Legacy ==
The track, "Idiots Are Taking Over" was featured as the song on the DVD menu of The Sasquatch Gang.

In an episode of One Tree Hill, several lines from "Re-Gaining Unconsciousness" were read aloud, and "The Separation of Church and Skate" was a playable track on Tony Hawk's Underground.

Pop-punk band MxPx released a cover of "Franco Un-American" on July 2, 2019, with updated lyrics reflecting the contemporary American political climate. The cover artwork mimics that of The War on Errorism, with a caricature of Republican Senate Majority Leader Mitch McConnell in place of George W. Bush.

== Track listing ==
All tracks written by Fat Mike.

No.	Title	Length
1.	"The Separation of Church and Skate"	3:10
2.	"The Irrationality of Rationality"	2:32
3.	"Franco Un-American"	2:25
4.	"Idiots Are Taking Over"	3:23
5.	"She's Nubs"	2:05
6.	"Mattersville"	2:29
7.	"Decom-poseur"	2:54
8.	"Medio-core"	3:05
9.	"Anarchy Camp"	2:54
10.	"American Errorist (I Hate Hate Haters)"	1:52
11.	"We Got Two Jealous Agains"	2:04
12.	"13 Stitches"	1:55
13.	"Re-gaining Unconsciousness"	2:39
14.	"Whoops, I OD'd"	2:50
Total length:		36:16

- On the vinyl back cover, the track "Decom-poseur" is misspelled as "Decom-posuer".

== Personnel ==
=== NOFX ===
- Fat Mike – vocals, bass, keyboards, EBow
- Eric Melvin – guitar, vocals
- El Hefe – guitar, horns, vocals
- Erik Sandin – drums, percussion

=== Additional musicians ===
- Spike Slawson – additional vocals
- Karina Denike – additional vocals, vibraphone on "Mattersville"
- Sascha Lazor – additional guitars on "Anarchy Camp"
- Ronnie King – additional guitars on "Anarchy Camp"
- Jesse Sutherland (aka FM Static) from the Epoxies – additional keyboards on "Franco Un-American"
- Jason Freese – saxophone on "Anarchy Camp"
- Eduardo Hernandez from Mad Caddies – trombone on "Mattersville"

=== Production ===
- Recorded at Motor Studios, San Francisco, US – except "13 Stitches" which "wasn't actually recorded anywhere", according to the liner notes.
- Produced by Ryan Greene and Fat Mike
- Engineered by Adam Krammer
- Mastered at Oasis by Eddy Schreyer

== Charts ==
Chart performance for The War on Errorism
Chart (2003)	Peak position
Australian Albums (ARIA)	29
Austrian Albums (Ö3 Austria)	46
Canadian Albums (Nielsen SoundScan)	26
Dutch Alternative Albums (Alternative Top 30)	3
French Albums (SNEP)	81
German Albums (Offizielle Top 100)	27
Scottish Albums (Official Charts)	45
Swiss Albums (Schweizer Hitparade)	25
UK Albums (Official Charts)	48
UK Independent Albums (Official Charts)	4
UK Rock & Metal Albums (Official Charts)	3
US Billboard 200	44
US Independent Albums (Billboard)	1
