= Surfer (EP) =

EP by NOFX
- Released: April 10, 2001
- Genre: Punk rock
- Length: 13:33
- Label: Fat Wreck Chords

NOFX chronology
Pump Up the Valuum (2000)	Surfer (2001)	BYO Split Series Volume III (2002)

Surfer is a 2001 EP by NOFX.

The record was released on Fat Mike's record label, Fat Wreck Chords. The methodology for writing and recording the songs was much the same as the band's Fuck the Kids EP. Fat Mike wrote all of the songs in a limited amount of time, claiming to have only given himself ten minutes to finish each one, and did not teach the songs to the rest of the band until the day of recording. The EP was recorded in two full-day sessions, making it one of the band's fastest-completed EP or album recording, second to Fuck the Kids which was recorded and mixed in a day and a half.

The EP was later included on the second disc of 45 or 46 Songs That Weren't Good Enough to Go on Our Other Records, but with one track omitted ("Three Shits to the Wind") in order to preserve something unique about the original 7" release.

The album cover, painted by Mark deSalvo, and lyric sheet were inspired by Bad Religion's 1988 record Suffer. Another reference to Suffer is etched into the vinyl: "THE MASSES OF HUMANITY HAVE ALWAYS HAD TO SURF," as opposed to "THE MASSES OF HUMANITY HAVE ALWAYS HAD TO SUFFER" which is etched on the Bad Religion album. The artwork of the lyrics being written on a wall was also replicated for Surfer.

The record is 13 minutes in length. The first 500 copies were pressed on blue vinyl, while subsequent pressings were released on black vinyl.

== Track listing ==
Side A

1. "Fun Things to Fuck (If You're a Winner)" - 1:05
2. "Juice Head" - 0:20
3. "Three on Speed" - 1:20
4. "New Happy Birthday Song" - 0:44
5. "Talking 'Bout Yo Momma" - 0:32
6. "Party Enema" - 1:30
7. "Can't Get the Stink Out" - 1:08

Side B

1. "Go to Work Wasted" - 1:01
2. "Fuck da Kids" - 0:34
3. "Whoa on the Whoas" - 0:42
4. "Three Shits to the Wind" - 0:59
5. "Puke on Cops" - 0:59
6. "I Gotta Pee" - 0:32
7. "Totally Fucked" - 2:11
