= Pods and Gods =

EP by NOFX
- Released: May 30, 2000
- Genre: Punk rock
- Length: 4:55
- Label: Fat Wreck Chords

NOFX chronology
The Decline (2000)	Pods and Gods (2000)	Pump Up the Valuum (2000)

Pods and Gods (FAT614) is a 7" EP by NOFX released one month prior to the release of Pump Up the Valuum. According to Fat Mike, the title track was intended to go on Pump Up the Valuum (the b-side was included on the album), but the band decided to use the song "My Vagina" instead. It was later included on 45 or 46 Songs That Weren't Good Enough to Go on Our Other Records. The record was limited to 12,000 copies on orange vinyl.

== Track listing ==
1. "Pods and Gods"
2. "What's the Matter with Parents Today?"
