= Timmy the Turtle =

EP by NOFX
- Released: May 18, 1999
- Recorded: August 1997 at Motor Studios in San Francisco
- Genre: Punk rock
- Length: 4:38
- Label: Fat Wreck Chords

NOFX chronology
So Long and Thanks for All the Shoes (1997)	Timmy the Turtle (1999)	The Decline (1999)

"Timmy the Turtle" is a song by the American punk rock band NOFX. It was recorded during the sessions for So Long and Thanks for All the Shoes. Duncan from Snuff sings the lead vocal on the song. This record was limited to 9,499 copies on green vinyl. As seen in the inlay of the "45 or 46 songs ..", this song is about Tim who counted the people at the entrance on the NOFX concerts over the years to help prevent promoters from taking advantage of the band.

== Track listing ==
Side A

1. "Timmy the Turtle" (1:39)

Side B

1. "The Plan" (2:59)
