= So Long and Thanks for All the Shoes =

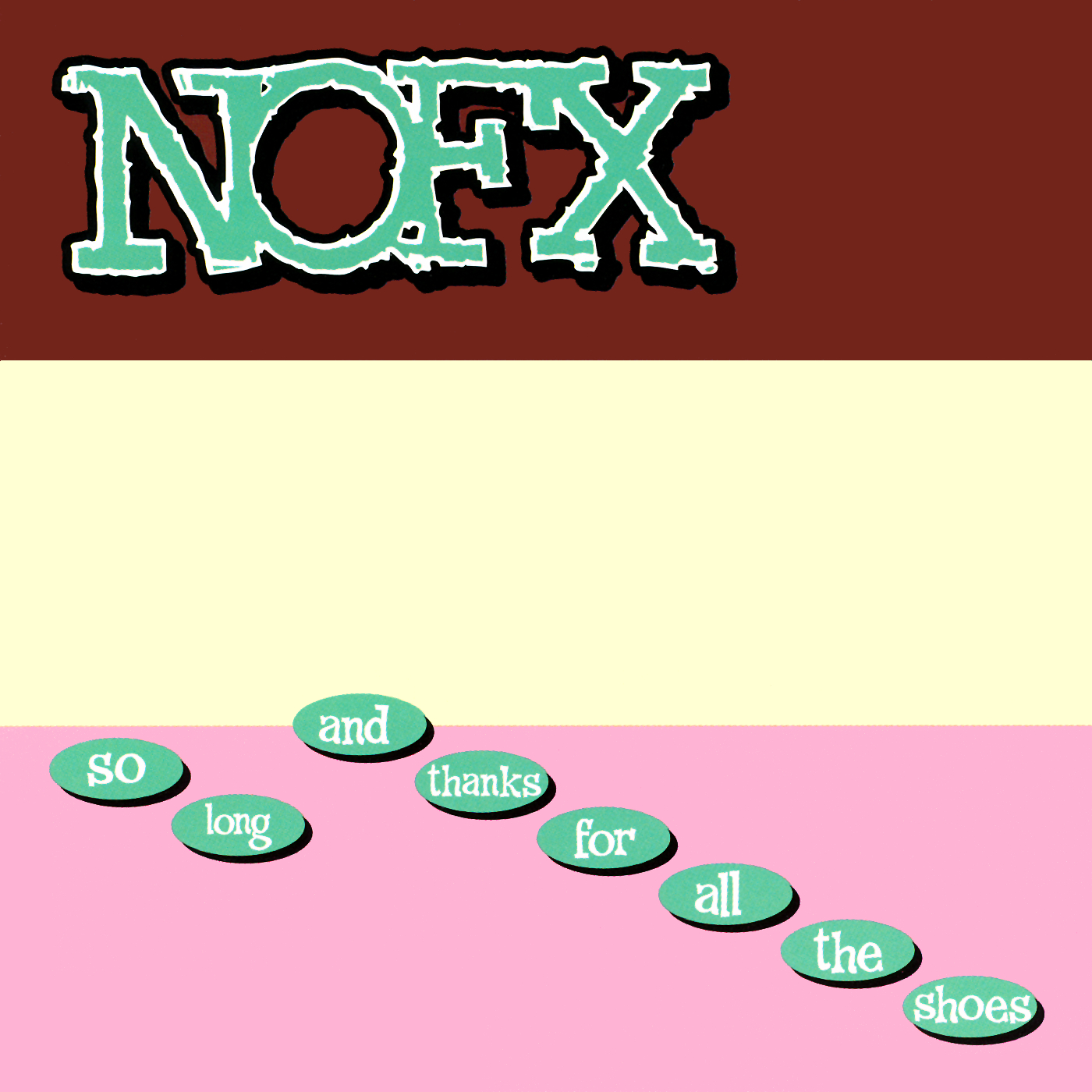

Studio album by NOFX
- Released: October 21, 1997 (US) November 4, 1997 (EU)
- Recorded: August 1997
- Studio: Motor (San Francisco)
- Genre: Punk rock; ska
- Length: 33:16
- Label: Epitaph
- Producer: Ryan Greene, Fat Mike

NOFX chronology
Fuck the Kids (1996)	So Long and Thanks for All the Shoes (1997)	Timmy the Turtle (1999)

Professional ratings
Review scores
Source	Rating
AllMusic	2/5 stars
North County Times	B+
Sputnikmusic	4/5 stars

So Long and Thanks for All the Shoes is the seventh studio album by the American punk rock band NOFX. It was released through Epitaph Records October 21, 1997, in the United States, and November 4, 1997, in Europe.

== Overview ==
The title is inspired by the fourth book of Douglas Adams's The Hitchhiker's Guide to the Galaxy series, So Long, and Thanks for All the Fish, and refers to the frequent occurrence of fans throwing footwear at the band during their live shows.

The album was recorded at San Francisco's Motor Studios in August 1997 and was produced by Fat Mike and regular Fat Wreck Chords producer Ryan Greene. The liner notes for the album claim it is 'arguably their third best album' (up to that point) although Fat Mike has referred to it as his favourite one on several occasions. Also therein the standard practice of including a photograph of each band member has been mocked, with members of other punk bands standing in for the four NOFX members:

- Fat Mike is replaced by Serge Verkhovsky, bassist in Limp,
- El Hefe is replaced by Otis Bartholomeu, vocalist and guitarist in Fluf,
- Eric Melvin (listed as just "Melvin") is replaced by 'Little John', roadie for Swingin' Utters,
- Erik Sandin (listed as "Smelly") is replaced by Chuck Platt, bassist in Good Riddance.

Track 9, "Champs Elysées", is a cover version of the track "Les Champs-Élysées" by Joe Dassin.

The song "Kill Rock Stars" is written about musician Kathleen Hanna, referencing her by name: "Kill the rockstars? How ironic, Kathleen. You've been crowned the newest queen." The song's title is a reference to riot grrrl record label Kill Rock Stars. In response Hanna wrote "Deceptacon", included on Le Tigre's first album, which referred to the NOFX song "Linoleum": "Your lyrics are dumb like a linoleum floor, I'll walk on it, I'll walk all over you".

The final track, "Falling in Love", is reportedly a love song about a friend of Fat Mike and his friend's wife together in a plane in rapid descent, destined to crash. The track has a 'hidden ending' that starts at timecode 4:15. It is a recording of a segment from Howard Stern's radio show in which the host's DJ begins to play the track "Drugs Are Good", from the band's HOFX EP. Stern clearly dislikes the track and stops it after 36 seconds, effectively labelling it as disco before going on to rename the band 'No Talent'. The first pressing of the cd contains an extended bonus track: 8 min instrumental immediately after this radio show segment, that ends with a 10-second song "Congratulations, you made it through the song, I bet you never thought anyone could play something so wrong".

On the CD it bears the Warning "Unlawful Duplication May be Hazardous to your Health!". This warning might be a parody of Bad Religion albums because some Bad Religion albums (e.g., Suffer, No Control) carry this warning.

== Track listing ==
All tracks are written by Fat Mike except where noted.

No.	Title	Length
1.	"It's My Job to Keep Punk Rock Elite"	1:20
2.	"Kids of the K-Hole"	2:16
3.	"Murder the Government"	0:46
4.	"Monosyllabic Girl"	0:54
5.	"180 Degrees"	2:10
6.	"All His Suits Are Torn"	2:19
7.	"All Outta Angst"	1:53
8.	"I'm Telling Tim"	1:17
9.	"Champs Elysées" (Wilsh, Deighan, P Delanoë)	2:02
10.	"Dad's Bad News"	2:02
11.	"Kill Rock Stars"	1:33
12.	"Eat the Meek"	3:32
13.	"The Desperation's Gone"	2:24
14.	"Flossing a Dead Horse" (instrumental)	1:46
15.	"Quart in Session"	1:38
16.	"Falling in Love"	5:13
Total length:		30:04

== Personnel ==
=== NOFX ===
- Fat Mike – vocals, bass
- Eric Melvin – guitar
- El Hefe – guitar, trumpet
- Erik Sandin – drums, percussion

=== Additional personnel ===
- Serge Slovnik (Serge Verkhovsky) – tuba, trombone
- Nate Albert – "chanky" guitar
- Ryan Greene – tambourine
- Spike Slawson – backing vocals

=== Production ===
- Ryan Greene, Fat Mike – producers
- Ryan Greene – engineer
- Adam Krammer – second engineer

== Charts ==
Chart performance for So Long and Thanks for All The Shoes
Chart (1997)	Peak position
Australian Albums (ARIA)	93
French Albums (SNEP)	51
German Albums (Offizielle Top 100)	40
US Billboard 200	79
