= Erik Sandin =

American drummer

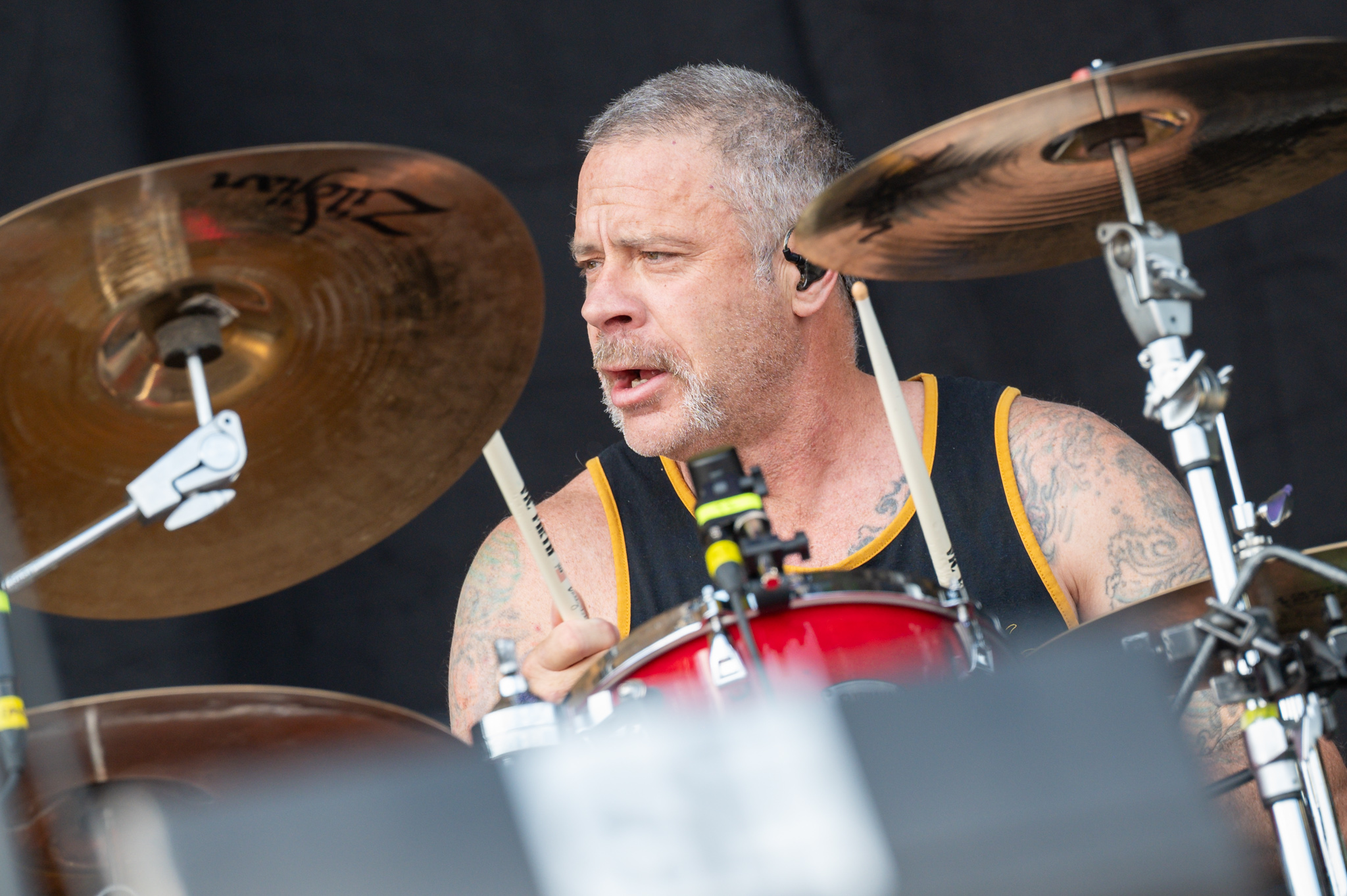
- Sandin in 2023

Background information
- Also known as: Smelly
- Born: July 29, 1966 (age 59)
- Genres: Punk rock; skate punk; melodic hardcore; ska punk; pop-punk; hardcore punk
- Instrument: Drums
- Years active: 1983–present
- Formerly of: NOFX; Caustic Cause
- Spouse: Katherine Woodside

Erik "Smelly" Sandin (born July 29, 1966), is an American musician, best known as the drummer of the punk rock band NOFX, and former member of punk rock band Caustic Cause. He was a founding member of NOFX when they formed in Hollywood, California, in 1983, and has been with the band for a majority of their run until their retirement in 2024.

Sandin's primary drumming style has consistently fallen within the characteristics of skate punk rock, indicating an energetic, fast paced way of playing. Outside of NOFX, Sandin has been running his own surfboard shaping business, Pickle Stix, since 2020.

== History ==
Born and raised in Southern California, Erik Sandin grew up engrossed in surf and skate culture, which would later influence his decision to open a surfboard shaping business. In 1981, at fifteen years old, Sandin took up learning drums because a local punk rock band needed a drummer. From this decision, two years later, Sandin and his two friends, Erik Melvin and Michael John Burkett, would form the punk rock band that is now known as NOFX.

Two years after forming NOFX, Sandin moved to Santa Barbara, leaving the band. In just one year without Sandin, the band had already gone through two drummers (Scott Sellers and Scott Aldahl), and in 1986, the band talked Sandin into rejoining NOFX.

Sandin has been NOFX's permanent drummer since his return in 1986, and played drums on every NOFX full-length album and EP released. The band Dogpiss featured a song about him called "Erik Sandin's Stand In" on the Fat Wreck Chords compilation album Short Music for Short People.

=== Drugs and rehabilitation ===
Spun on by an insecure childhood, Sandin turned to drug use early in his life. Around 1985-1986, Sandin began primarily using heroin, resulting in ceased communication with his family. Six months before he would start sobriety, Sandin was arrested and served jail time.

The other members of NOFX did not address the matter until Sandin's drug use began affecting the band and their workflow. Before the recording of the 1992 album White Trash, Two Heebs and a Bean, NOFX frontman Fat Mike gave Sandin an ultimatum. He had to quit heroin or be replaced. After realizing that NOFX was the most important thing in his life and with assistance of Brett Gurewitz and Lynn Strait, Sandin entered rehab at The Ranch in Desert Hot Springs, California for treatment of heroin addiction. Sandin has not used the drug since.

As it can be seen in the video series Backstage Passport, he conducts a more sober and "clean" life than his bandmates, often going back to the hotel after a show instead of hanging out and partying with the rest of the band.

== Pickle Stix ==
In early 2020, unsure of whether or not NOFX would tour again due to the COVID-19 pandemic, Sandin turned his hobby of shaping surfboards into an actual business. Sandin launched Pickle Stix and began crafting and shipping custom surfboards out of his garage in Long Beach, California. During this period, Sandin was crafting between twenty and forty boards a day, likening the process to his approach to creating music on his instrument.

Sandin began shaping surfboards in 2008, which spurred out of a desire to contribute to surfing's art form, similar to his desire to contribute to music's art form. The second board he ever shaped was finished with a shade of green reminiscent of a pickle. Sandin's friend, Curly, began calling it his pickle stick, hence the title Sandin would eventually decide upon for the business.

Before the establishment of Pickle Stix, Sandin claims to have shaped a couple hundred boards in his free time for the purpose of riding some himself, selling on craigslist, and gifting to friends.

== Drums ==
=== Style and technique ===
Sandin's drumming style is rooted in skate punk rock, characterized by fast and energetic 16th note rhythms in both the hands and feet. Arguably most notable is his double kick technique using just a single kick pedal.

An aspect of his kick technique has to do with the type of shoes he uses, for he prefers to use clean shoes with some grip, so as to not let his foot slide around the kick pedal.

=== Equipment ===
Since 1992, Sandin has frequented the Yamaha Absolute Hybrid Maple Kit as his drum kit of choice, in which he prefers a 22" x 18" kick drum, 14" x 6" snare drum, 12" rack tom, and 16" floor tom. Regarding snare drums, Sandin specifically frequents the AMS1460 and RRS1455.

Sandin has also been known to play Yamaha's Stage Custom Birch drum kit.

== Aliases ==
- Erik Ghint (Arrogant) - White Trash, Two Heebs And A Bean
- Erik Shun (Erection) - S&M Airlines
- Groggy Nodbeggar - Ribbed
- Chris Telmeth (Crystal meth)
- Herb Reath Stinks (Her breath stinks) - Punk in Drublic
- Seymour Butts (See more butts) - The Longest Line EP
- Smelly - So Long and Thanks for All the Shoes, The War on Errorism, Coaster

== Albums with NOFX ==
- 1988 Liberal Animation
- 1989 S&M Airlines
- 1991 Ribbed
- 1992 The Longest Line
- 1992 Maximum Rocknroll
- 1992 White Trash, Two Heebs and a Bean
- 1994 Punk in Drublic
- 1995 I Heard They Suck Live!!
- 1996 Heavy Petting Zoo
- 1997 So Long and Thanks for All the Shoes
- 1999 The Decline
- 2000 Pump Up the Valuum
- 2002 45 or 46 Songs That Weren't Good Enough To Go On Our Other Records
- 2003 The War on Errorism
- 2006 Wolves in Wolves' Clothing
- 2007 They've Actually Gotten Worse Live!
- 2009 Coaster
- 2009 Cokie the Clown
- 2011 NOFX
- 2012 Self Entitled
- 2016 First Ditch Effort
- 2021 Single Album
- 2022 Double Album
