= Fuck the Kids =

7-inch EP by NOFX

EP by NOFX
- Released: August 26, 1996
- Recorded: April 13, 1996
- Studios: Razor's Edge (San Francisco, California)
- Genre: Punk rock
- Length: 9:55
- Label: Fat Wreck Chords

NOFX chronology
Heavy Petting Zoo (1996)	Fuck the Kids (1996)	So Long and Thanks for All the Shoes (1997)

Fuck the Kids is a 7-inch EP by American punk rock band NOFX. All the tracks were recorded in one day over the course of about four hours. Fat Mike had written all the songs, but none of the other band members knew them. Mike would teach the band the song, they would record it, keeping the first take where the band actually managed to make it through the whole song, and then move on. Mike refers to it as "sloppiness in pure form. You can't fake that kind of sloppiness."

The EP was later included on the second disc of 45 or 46 Songs That Weren't Good Enough to Go on Our Other Records, but with one track omitted ("Stupid Canadians") in order to preserve the uniqueness of the original 7-inch release.

The entire EP was recorded and mixed in only 8 hours.

The first 500 copies were pressed on clear-green vinyl, while all others appeared on black vinyl. It has sold a total of 35,000 copies.

The seven inch artwork is the same as Propagandhi's seven inch "How to Clean a Couple o' Things" (which had been built on top of the artwork for "The P.M.R.C. Can Suck on This!") but includes the NOFX logo and a puppet.

Inscribed on the cover artwork is the phrase, "That shitty band Boycot from Holland can fuck off!" This was a response to an obscure anarcho-punk band from Alkmaar, who titled their debut 7" EP "Only Stupid Bastards Help Epitaph." The insert included a diatribe against the sellout of punk rock: "No NOFX, Fuck Offspring, Slay Green Day."

== Track listing ==
All tracks are written by Fat Mike.

No.	Title	Length
1.	"Fuck the Kids"	0:06
2.	"Fuck the Kids II"	0:05
3.	"I'm Telling Tim"	1:03
4.	"Reagan Sucks"	1:23
5.	"Posuer"	0:32
6.	"My Name's Bud"	0:51
7.	"Two on Glue"	1:07
8.	"Please Stop Fucking My Mom"	0:56
9.	"Murder the Government"	0:42
10.	"Stranger Than Fishin"	0:51
11.	"Stupid Canadians"	0:39
12.	"Eric Melvin Vs. PCP"	0:39
13.	"Always Hate Hippies"	0:48
Total length:		9:55
