= El Hefe =

American musician (born 1965)

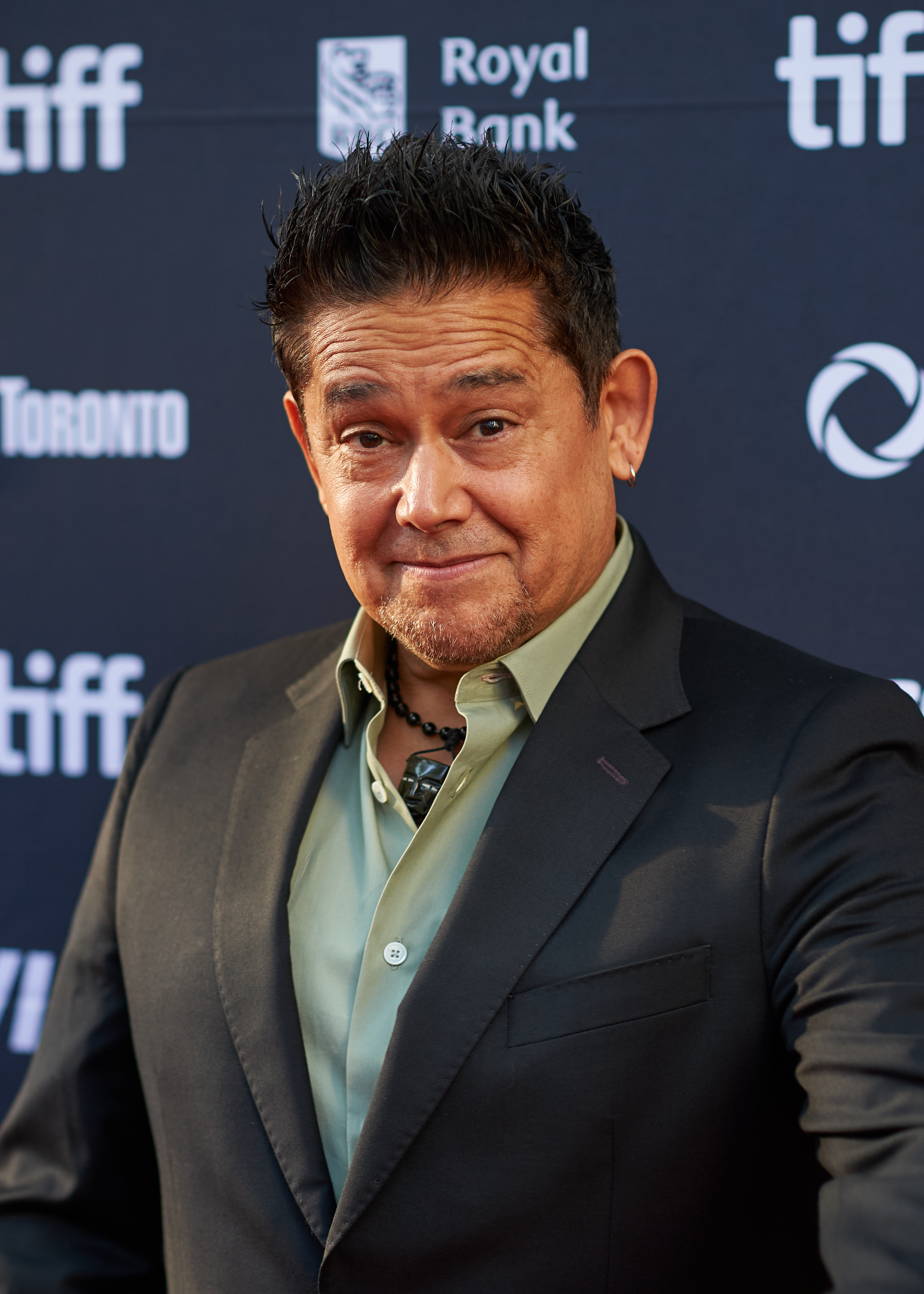
- Abeyta in 2025

Background information
- Also known as: Hefe
- Born: Aaron Abeyta; August 8, 1965 (age 61); Sacramento, California, U.S.
- Genres: Punk rock; ska punk; skate punk
- Occupation: Musician
- Instruments: Guitar; trumpet; trombone; vocals
- Years active: 1991–present
- Labels: Epitaph; Fat Wreck Chords
- Member of: The Aquabats
- Formerly of: NOFX

Aaron Abeyta (born August 8, 1965), better known as El Hefe or simply Hefe, from el Jefe (Spanish for "the boss"), is an American musician and actor, best known as the lead guitarist and trumpet player for the American punk rock band NOFX. He started playing guitar at the age of 13, but he states that he started taking it seriously at the age of 15, joining his first band. He joined NOFX in 1991 and his first recording with the band was his contribution to their EP The Longest Line.

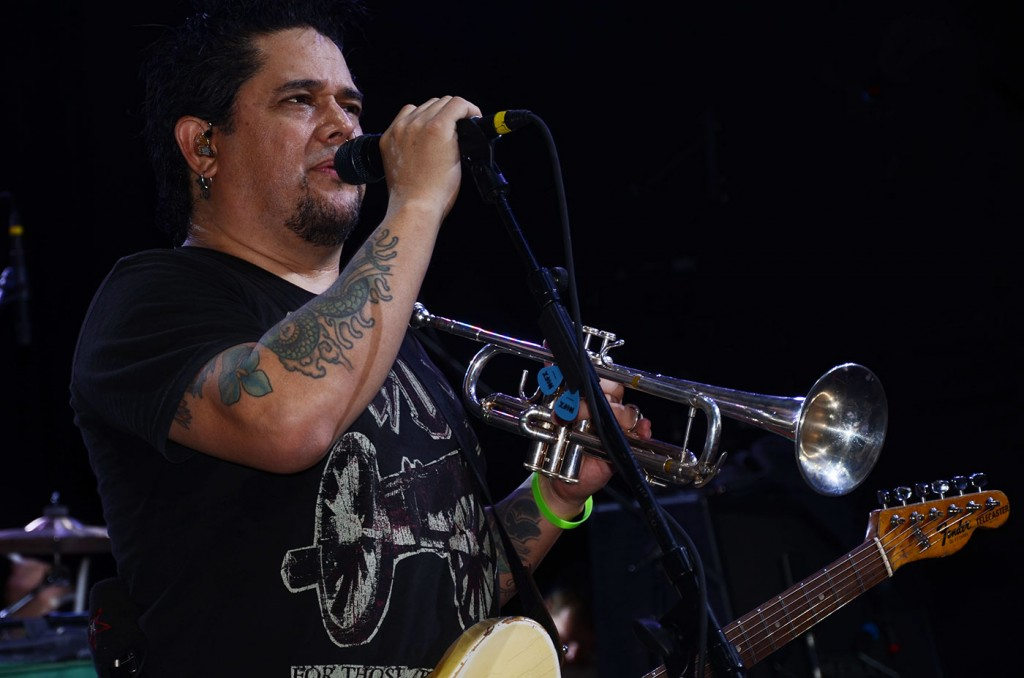
El Hefe performing in 2012

Abeyta was given his nickname by NOFX founder Fat Mike because at the time when Abeyta joined the band, Fat Mike was dating a girl named Erin and he didn't want there to be any confusion. According to Fat Mike, "I suggested a Mexican-sounding name, like 'El Jefe.' I don’t speak Spanish, so I didn’t realize the 'h' sound is usually spelled with a 'j.'"

Abeyta once owned a nightclub called "Hefe's" in Eureka, California, and now lives in Stevenson Ranch, California. He has two children and is divorced from Jennifer Abeyta.

In 2025, Abeyta became a trumpet player for the ska/new wave band, The Aquabats.

On June 27th 2025 he released a solo single titled White Label.

== NOFX albums with El Hefe ==
- 1992: The Longest Line
- 1992: White Trash, Two Heebs and a Bean
- 1994: Punk in Drublic
- 1995: I Heard They Suck Live!!
- 1996: Heavy Petting Zoo
- 1997: So Long and Thanks for All the Shoes
- 1999: The Decline
- 2000: Pump Up the Valuum
- 2002: 45 or 46 Songs That Weren't Good Enough to Go on Our Other Records
- 2003: The War on Errorism
- 2006: Wolves in Wolves' Clothing
- 2007: They've Actually Gotten Worse Live!
- 2009: Coaster
- 2011: NOFX
- 2012: Self Entitled
- 2013: Stoke Extinguisher
- 2016: First Ditch Effort
- 2021: Single Album
- 2022: Double Album

== See also ==
- List of guitarists
