= Ryan Greene =

American record producer

- Occupations: Record producer, recording engineer
- Instrument: drums

Ryan Greene is an American record producer, sound engineer, former owner of Crush Recording Studios in Scottsdale, Arizona and founder of Area 52 Entertainment in Los Angeles, California. He has worked with many artists including Jay-Z, Lita Ford, Tonic, Mr. Big, Wilson Phillips, Megadeth, NOFX, Alice Cooper, Cheap Trick, Usher, Patti LaBelle, Dishwalla and Gladys Knight. He has worked on over 250 musical projects and has been described as an "A-list producer".

== Biography ==
Ryan Greene started his musical career as a drummer in local Los Angeles bands. He became a live engineer at the age of 15. At age 19 he started working at MCA Music Publishing Studio as a tape duplicator. Greene was eventually promoted directly to first engineer. He was the youngest engineer at MCA. While employed by MCA he worked together with people like Glen Ballard, Diane Warren and Desmond Child.

From 1988 to 1996, Greene worked at EMI music publishing as chief engineer where he did all the pre-production for Megadeth's best selling album Countdown to Extinction, released in 1992. It sold over a million copies. This eventually lead Greene to working with Megadeth bassist Dave Ellefson's band F5.

In 1994, he worked with Brett Gurewitz owner of Epitaph Records and founding member of the punk rock band Bad Religion on a demo recording for Bad Religion. Brett Gurewitz hooked Ryan Greene up with the punk rock band NOFX and he produced their record Punk in Drublic the same year. The record sold more than a half million worldwide on its way to being certified gold and became NOFX's best selling record.

In 1997, Greene started Motor Studios in San Francisco together with Fat Mike owner of Fat Wreck Chords and frontman/singer/bass player of NOFX. Greene produced over 40 punk and rock bands for Fat Wreck Chords such as Lagwagon, No Use for a Name, Good Riddance, Pulley, Strung Out, Propagandhi, Me First and the Gimme Gimmes, The Dickies and was instrumental in coining the successful sound of the 1990s skate punk.

In 2005, Ryan Greene founded the Crush Recording Studios in Scottsdale, Arizona. In January 2009, Greene sold Crush Recording and opened his new recording facility Area 52 Entertainment.

Greene has also engineered and mixed songs for the video games Guitar Hero III: Legends of Rock, Guitar Hero: Aerosmith, Rock Revolution, and Rock Band.

In 2010, Greene opened a recording complex, Validus Recording, and was named 'Producer Of The Year’ by the Los Angeles Music Awards.

In 2011, he released a drum sample replacement library called Ryan Greene Alt Drums.

== Selected discography ==
- Adina Howard - Do You Wanna Ride? (1995)
- Back from Ashes - Back from Ashes (EP) (2009)
- Back from Ashes - 261 (2010)
- Bigwig - Invitation to Tragedy (2001)
- Dishwalla - Dishwalla (2005)
- Dogwood - Reverse, Then Forward Again (2004)
- Emphatic - Another Life (2013)
- F5 - A Drug for All Seasons (2005)
- Lita Ford - Greatest Hits Live! (2000)
- Megadeth - Rust in Peace Live (2010)
- Mojiganga - No Estamos Solos (2002)
- Nerf Herder - Nerf Herder (1996)
- NOFX - Punk in Drublic (1994)
- NOFX - The Decline (EP) (1999)
- Off Track - Explode (2009)
- Ridel High - "Self Destructive" [CD Single](1998)
- Usher - Here I Stand (2008)
