= Pump Up the Valuum =

Studio album by NOFX
- Released: June 13, 2000
- Recorded: 1999–2000
- Studio: Motor, San Francisco, California
- Genre: Punk rock
- Length: 31:35
- Label: Epitaph
- Producer: Ryan Greene; Fat Mike

NOFX chronology
| The Decline (1999) | Pump Up the Valuum (2000) | Surfer (2001) |

Pump Up the Valuum is the eighth studio album by the American punk rock band NOFX. It was released on June 13, 2000, on Epitaph Records, their last through the company.

== Production ==
The album's title deliberately misspells the trademark "Valium" to avoid a lawsuit, similar to the one the Melvins faced for their album Lysol. This is explained in the 45 or 46 Songs... album booklet.

The initial song, "And now for Something completely similar", is a parody of the famous saying "And now for Something completely different" from Monty Python skits. As a prank, the intro sounds very similar to "Linoleum" from the band's 1994 album Punk in Drublic, right down to El Hefe warming up his voice before the song begins, while the solo bass part echoes Shadows of Defeat from Good Riddance. Both similarities are addressed in the song's lyrics.

The song "Dinosaurs will die" features a part of the intro skit from the F.U.'s song "Civil Defense" off the album Kill for Christ. The words which are spoken during this intro ("This is not a test of the emergency broadcast system") also appear in the Bad Religion song "Los Angeles Is Burning", on their 2004 album "The Empire strikes first".

The band recorded eight songs that were left off the final version of the album. According to Fat Mike, "...the title track 'Pump Up the Valuum' got cut from the album. That's weird. We gave it to Epitaph for Punk O Rama 5." Three other songs were mentioned in the Pump Up the Valuum booklet, which appeared elsewhere: "Medio-core" (later in The War on Errorism, 2003); "Insulted by Germans" (later in 7" of the Month #1, 2005, and Wolves in Wolves' Clothing, 2006); and "One Way Ticket to Fuckneckville" (later in Aggropop Now 2003, The War on Errorism, and 7" of the Month #7, 2005). Other outtakes include "Pods and Gods", "Lower", "Bath of Least Resistance", "San Francisco Fat", and "Pump Up the Valium".

== Release ==
On November 19, 1999, it was reported that NOFX's next album would be titled Pump Up the Valuum. On March 23, 2000, the album was announced for release in June. "Take Two Placebos and Call Me Lame" was posted on Epitaph's website for free download on April 16, 2000. "Bottles to the Ground" was sent to radio in May 2000. In May and June 2001, the band went on a tour of North-western US, and the western Canada. The band embarked on a brief US tour in October and November 2001, with support from Frenzal Rhomb and the Mad Caddies. In February 2002, the band toured across Australia with Frenzal Rhomb. The band played 10 shows in the US with Rancid in April 2002.

== Critical reception ==
Professional ratings
Review scores
| Source | Rating |
|---|---|
| AllMusic | 4/5 stars |
| North County Times | B+ |
| Ox-Fanzine | Favorable |
| Punknews.org | 4/5 stars |
| Rock Hard | 9/10 |

In 2005, Pump Up the Valuum was ranked number 331 in Rock Hard magazine's book The 500 Greatest Rock & Metal Albums of All Time. The album was included at number 17 on Rock Sound's "The 51 Most Essential Pop Punk Albums of All Time" list.

== Track listing ==
All tracks are written by Fat Mike.

| No. | Title | Length |
|---|---|---|
| 1. | "And Now for Something Completely Similar" | 0:58 |
| 2. | "Take Two Placebos and Call Me Lame" | 2:25 |
| 3. | "What's the Matter with Parents Today?" | 1:58 |
| 4. | "Dinosaurs Will Die" | 2:58 |
| 5. | "Thank God It's Monday" | 1:39 |
| 6. | "Clams Have Feelings Too (Actually They Don't)" | 2:32 |
| 7. | "Louise" | 1:49 |
| 8. | "Stranger Than Fishin'" | 1:05 |
| 9. | "Pharmacist's Daughter" | 1:58 |
| 10. | "Bottles to the Ground" | 2:20 |
| 11. | "Total Bummer" | 2:13 |
| 12. | "My Vagina" | 2:36 |
| 13. | "Herojuana" | 2:46 |
| 14. | "Theme from a NOFX Album" | 4:18 |
| Total length: | | 31:35 |

== Personnel ==
NOFX

- Fat Mike – vocals, bass
- Eric Melvin – guitar
- El Hefe – guitar
- Erik Sandin – drums

Additional musicians

- Spike Slawson – additional vocals
- Bill Hansson – accordion

Production

- Ryan Greene, Fat Mike – producers
- Ryan Greene – mixing, recording
- Adam Krammer – additional engineer

== Charts ==
Chart performance for Pump Up the Valuum
| Chart (2000) | Peak position |
|---|---|
| Australian Albums (ARIA) | 19 |
| French Albums (SNEP) | 44 |
| German Albums (Offizielle Top 100) | 64 |
| Italian Albums (FIMI) | 23 |
| New Zealand Albums (RMNZ) | 27 |
| Swiss Albums (Schweizer Hitparade) | 91 |
| UK Albums (OCC) | 50 |
| US Billboard 200 | 61 |
| US Independent Albums (Billboard) | 3 |
