= Eric Melvin =

American punk musician

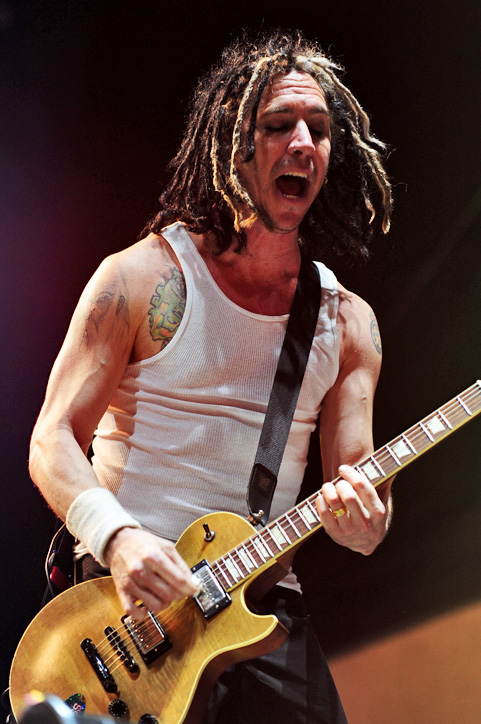
- Eric Melvin in 2010

Background information
- Also known as: Melvin
- Born: Eric Scott Melvin; July 9, 1966 (age 59)
- Genres: Punk rock; skate punk; melodic hardcore; ska punk; pop-punk; hardcore punk
- Instruments: Guitar; vocals; accordion; bass
- Years active: 1983–present
- Labels: Fat Wreck Chords, Epitaph, Mystic
- Website: nofx.org

Eric Scott Melvin (born July 9, 1966) is an American musician and founding member of the punk rock band NOFX. Throughout the band's existence, he and Fat Mike were the only band members who stayed since the beginning.

== NOFX ==
Melvin plays guitar and sings backup vocals on most NOFX songs and wrote the guitar riffs for NOFX songs such as the intro for "Leave It Alone". His vocal style is iconically called the "Mel Yell".

== Music ==
Melvin is a founding member of Punk Rock Karaoke with Greg Hetson and Steve Soto, though he rarely performs with them. Melvin is an irregular touring member of Me First and the Gimme Gimmes.

== Personal life ==
Melvin is of Ukrainian and Jewish descent and grew up in Hollywood.

In 2016, Melvin married Australian-born artist Sarah Melvin. They have identical twin daughters together: Ivy Laine Melvin and Phaedra Rose Melvin, born 21 minutes apart. Melvin also has two boys, Eli Melvin and Caspian Melvin, and lives with his wife Sarah and all four children in the Encinitas area of Southern California. In 2017, he sold his home in San Francisco with some who viewed the home stating "This can't be a punk rocker's house. It's really tasteful."

Melvin was raised Jewish, but also relates to Buddhism and Taoism. He also practices meditation, breath work, and yoga.

== Albums with NOFX ==
- 1985 Maximum Rocknroll
- 1988 Liberal Animation
- 1989 S&M Airlines
- 1991 Ribbed
- 1992 The Longest Line
- 1992 White Trash, Two Heebs and a Bean
- 1994 Punk in Drublic
- 1995 I Heard They Suck Live!!
- 1996 Heavy Petting Zoo
- 1997 So Long and Thanks for All the Shoes
- 1999 The Decline
- 2000 Pump Up the Valuum
- 2002 45 or 46 Songs That Weren't Good Enough To Go On Our Other Records
- 2003 The War on Errorism
- 2006 Never Trust a Hippy
- 2006 Wolves in Wolves' Clothing
- 2007 They've Actually Gotten Worse Live!
- 2009 Coaster
- 2009 Cokie the Clown
- 2012 Self Entitled
- 2013 Stoke Extinguisher
- 2014 Backstage Passport Soundtrack
- 2016 First Ditch Effort
- 2018 Ribbed: Live in a Dive
- 2021 Single Album
- 2022 Double Album
