= Punk in Drublic =

Studio album by NOFX
- Released: July 19, 1994
- Recorded: 1993–1994
- Studios: Westbeach Recorders, Hollywood, California
- Genres: Skate punk; hardcore punk; melodic hardcore; pop-punk
- Length: 39:55
- Label: Epitaph
- Producers: Ryan Greene, Fat Mike

NOFX chronology
White Trash, Two Heebs and a Bean (1992)	Punk in Drublic (1994)	I Heard They Suck Live!! (1995)

Singles from Punk In Drublic
- 1. "Don't Call Me White" Released: May 11, 1994; 2. "Leave It Alone" Released: 1995

Punk In Drublic
- 20th anniversary reissue cover

Punk in Drublic is the fifth studio album by the American punk rock band NOFX. It was released on July 19, 1994, through Epitaph Records. The title is a spoonerism of "Drunk in Public".

Punk in Drublic is NOFX's most successful album to date, peaking at number 12 on Billboard's Heatseekers chart. The album has received positive reviews and is now considered a classic punk album by fans and critics alike. Six years after its release, it became the band's only gold record for sales of over 500,000 copies in the United States. Worldwide, the record has sold over 1 million copies.

== Reception and legacy ==
Professional ratings
Review scores
Source	Rating
AllMusic	4.5/5 stars
Punk Planet	Favorable
The Rolling Stone Album Guide	4/5 stars
The Village Voice	A−

The AllMusic review by Stephen Thomas Erlewine stated: "The quartet didn't change their approach at all — at their core, they remain a heavy, speed-addled, hook-conscious post-hardcore punk group — but their songwriting has improved, as has their attack."

=== Accolades ===
Publication	Country	Accolade	Year	Rank
Guitar World	United States	Superunknown: 50 Iconic Albums That Defined 1994	2014	*
United Kingdom	United States	The 51 Most Essential Pop Punk Albums of All Time	2014	4
United Kingdom	Kerrang!	51 Greatest Pop Punk Albums Ever	2015	6

* denotes an unordered list

The album was a big influence on Blink-182's Cheshire Cat (1995), Unwritten Law's Oz Factor (1996), Lagwagon's Let's Talk About Feelings (1998), Sum 41's All Killer No Filler (2001) and Anti-Flag's The General Strike (2012).

== Track listing ==
All tracks are written by Fat Mike, except where noted.

No.	Title	Writer(s)	Length
1.	"Linoleum"		2:10
2.	"Leave It Alone"	Fat Mike, Eric Melvin	2:04
3.	"Dig"		2:16
4.	"The Cause"		1:37
5.	"Don't Call Me White"		2:33
6.	"My Heart Is Yearning"		2:23
7.	"Perfect Government"	Mark Curry	2:06
8.	"The Brews"		2:40
9.	"The Quass"		1:18
10.	"Dying Degree"		1:50
11.	"Fleas"		1:48
12.	"Lori Meyers"		2:21
13.	"Jeff Wears Birkenstocks"		1:26
14.	"Punk Guy"		1:08
15.	"Happy Guy"		1:58
16.	"Reeko"		3:05
17.	"Scavenger Type"		7:12
Total length:			39:55

== Personnel ==
=== NOFX ===
- Fat Mike – vocals, bass
- Eric Melvin – guitar
- El Hefe – guitar, trumpet
- Herb Reath Stinks – drums

=== Additional musicians ===
- Mark Curry – additional vocals on "Perfect Government"
- Kim Shattuck – additional vocals on "Lori Meyers"
- Chris Dowd – trombone on "Dig"
- Kenny Lyon – additional guitars
- Mr. Rojers – steel drums on "My Heart Is Yearning"
- New Jew Revue – gang vocals on "The Brews"

=== Technical personnel ===
- Ryan Greene; Fat Mike – producers
- Ryan Greene – mixing, engineer
- Steve Kravac – assistant engineer

== Charts ==
=== Weekly charts ===
Chart (2025)	Peak position
Croatian International Albums (HDU)	37

== Certifications ==
Region	Certification	Certified units/sales
United States (RIAA)	Gold	500,000^{^}
^{^} Shipments figures based on certification alone.

== Album notes ==
- The song "Jeff Wears Birkenstocks" was written about Jeff Abarta, an Epitaph Records employee. In 2017, the Birkenstock company produced a short-form documentary about how the song came together that includes new interviews on the subject with Jeff and Fat Mike.
- Track 17 contains a hidden track starting at 5:29, after three minutes of silence; guitarist El Hefe performs impressions of cartoon characters, such as Yosemite Sam and Popeye.
- "Linoleum" is covered by hardcore-punk band Shai Hulud, Russell and the Wolf Choir, post-third wave ska band Streetlight Manifesto on their 2010 album 99 Songs of Revolution, Bad Astronaut, August Burns Red and Frank Turner
- The song "Lori Meyers" was covered by Aiden as a hidden track on their album Knives.
- The song "Dying Degree" was covered by Evergreen Terrace on their cover album Writer's Block.
- The song "Leave It Alone" references another song, "Bringing In the Sheaves", written in 1874 by Knowles Shaw. It is a popular American gospel song strongly associated with Protestant Christians. Despite this fact, both credited songwriters, Fat Mike and Eric Melvin are Jewish. "Leave It Alone" was also the only song from the album to get a music video
