= NOFX =

American punk rock band

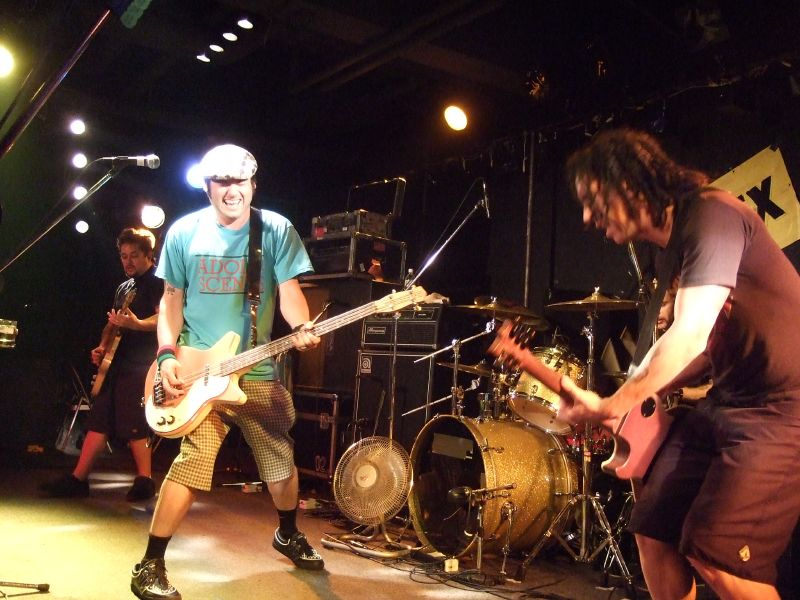
- NOFX performing in 2007

Background information
- Origin: Los Angeles, California, U.S.
- Genres: Punk rock; skate punk; melodic hardcore; ska punk; pop-punk
- Works: Discography
- Years active: 1983–2024; 2026
- Labels: Mystic; Epitaph; Fat Wreck Chords
- Spinoffs: Codefendants
- Past members: Fat Mike; Eric Melvin; Erik Sandin; El Hefe; Scott Sellers; Scott Aldahl; Dave Allen; Dave Casillas; Steve Kidwiler
- Website: nofxofficialwebsite.com

NOFX (/ˌnoʊɛfˈɛks/) was an American punk rock band, formed in Los Angeles in 1983. Bassist/lead vocalist Fat Mike, rhythm guitarist Eric Melvin and drummer Erik Sandin were original founding and longest-serving members of the band, who have appeared on every release by the band, although Sandin had departed briefly in 1985, only to rejoin the following year. El Hefe joined the band in 1991 to play lead guitar and trumpet, rounding out the best-known iteration of the lineup.

NOFX's mainstream success coincided with increased interest in punk rock during the 1990s; unlike many of their contemporaries, however, they had never been signed to a major label. NOFX released fifteen studio albums, sixteen extended plays and a number of 7" singles over a career spanning more than four decades. The band rose to popularity with their fifth studio album Punk in Drublic (1994), which is their only release to receive a gold certification by the RIAA. Their fifteenth and final studio album, Double Album, was released on December 2, 2022. The group has sold over eight million records worldwide, making them one of the most successful independent bands ever. In 2008, NOFX broadcast their own show on Fuse entitled NOFX: Backstage Passport. The band retired in October 2024 after a farewell tour, but has since released both new and previously-unreleased tracks or releases.

The staff of Consequence ranked the band at number 13 on their list of "The 100 Best Pop Punk Bands" in 2019.

== History ==
=== 1983–1987: Early years ===
In 1983, guitarist Eric Melvin met bassist/vocalist Mike Burkett (Fat Mike) and started the band under the name NO-FX, after a Boston hardcore punk band called Negative FX. At this time, they were joined by drummer Erik "Smelly" Sandin. NOFX's first recording was a demo from 1984, entitled Thalidomide Child, produced by Germs drummer Don Bolles, which did not sell many copies, and Fat Mike once claimed that no copies existed. The demo would be re-released in 2012. The group released its self-titled debut extended play NOFX on Mystic Records in 1985; it was later re-released in 1992 as part of the Maximum Rocknroll CD.

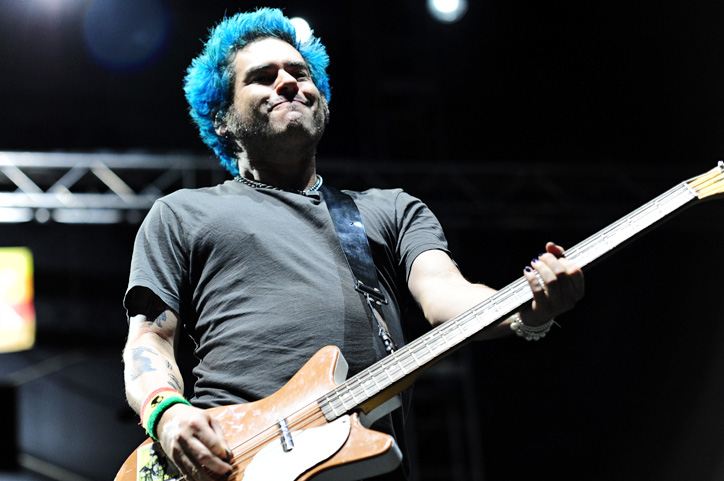
Founding member Fat Mike

The band's line-up underwent numerous changes prior to 1991. For a year, Erik "Smelly" Sandin left the band and was replaced by Scott Sellers, and later by Scott Aldahl. Dave Allen was in the band for about four months, until he died in a car accident. In 1986, the band released the extended play So What If We're on Mystic!. Dave Casillas joined the band on second guitar in 1987 and was featured on the extended play The P.M.R.C. Can Suck on This, attacking the PMRC's campaign for music censorship. The original cover was an edited S&M photo; the cover for the re-released version was changed to a photo of Eric Melvin. Prior to the release of Liberal Animation, a compilation of 14 early NOFX songs was released on Mystic Records. The album was self-titled, and featured the songs from the NOFX and So What If We're on Mystic! extended plays, and only around 1,000 copies were pressed. The album's cover was a redesigned version of the cover from the NOFX extended play.

=== 1988–1993: First four albums and signing to Epitaph ===
NOFX recorded their debut studio album Liberal Animation in 1988 with Brett Gurewitz of Bad Religion. Although the title and some of the album's lyrics mocked vegetarianism and animal rights, Fat Mike says that he became a vegetarian after writing the Liberal Animation album. The album was reissued in 1991 on Gurewitz's label Epitaph Records. Casillas left the band shortly after the recording of Liberal Animation and was replaced by Steve Kidwiler. The band released its second studio album, S&M Airlines, through Epitaph in 1989.

In 1991, NOFX released its third studio album, Ribbed. Shortly after the album was released, Steve Kidwiler left the band, and Aaron Abeyta (a.k.a. "El Hefe") joined the group. With Abeyta, the band recorded the extended play The Longest Line, followed by the studio album White Trash, Two Heebs and a Bean, released in May and November 1992 respectively. Also in 1992, NOFX's former label Mystic Records released Maximum Rocknroll, which compiles early singles and demo songs, and is a reissue of their 1989 long-out-of-print compilation tape E Is for Everything. Despite being referred to as an "official" release, Fat Mike has been quoted as saying that he did not know that the album existed until he saw a copy of it "in a store."

=== 1994–1999: Rise to popularity ===
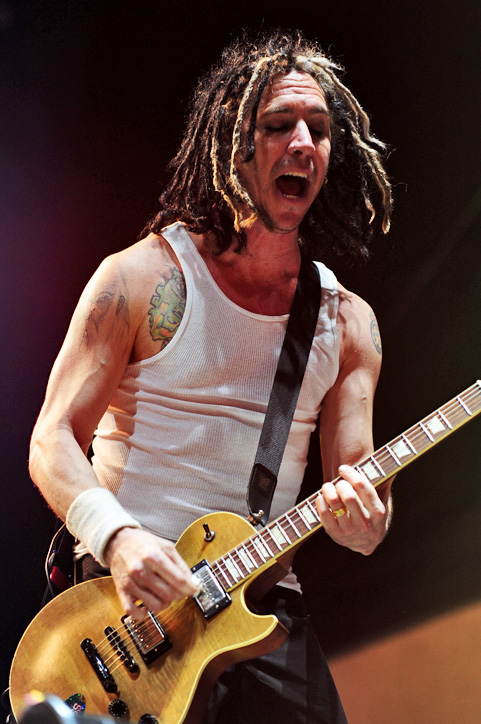
Founding member Eric Melvin

In the wake of the 1990s punk rock revival revolution (dominated by Green Day, the Offspring, Bad Religion and Rancid), NOFX released their fifth studio album Punk in Drublic in July 1994. It is one of the band's most successful albums, peaking at number twelve on Billboard's Heatseekers chart, and obtaining gold status six years after its release. Although one of the album's singles "Leave It Alone" got airplay on active rock radio stations, the most notable being KROQ, its music video never received airplay on MTV. Fat Mike has been quoted saying, "We made the 'Leave It Alone' video, and we decided not to send it to MTV. We just didn't want to be a part of that machine, of that 'punk wave.'" Punk in Drublic is now considered a classic punk album by fans and critics alike.

Due to the success of Punk in Drublic, NOFX received many offers to sign with major record labels, but the band declined the offers. In 1995, the band released its first live album, I Heard They Suck Live!!. In the liner notes the band explicitly rejected the advances of major record labels and radio airplay, stating "We've been doing fine all these years without you so leave us alone!"

Punk in Drublic was followed by 1996's Heavy Petting Zoo, whose LP companion featured different cover art and the name Eating Lamb. The artwork for the CD featured a man holding a sheep, while the LP depicted the same man in a 69 position with the sheep. The Eating Lamb version was banned from sale in Germany due to its obscene cover art. The LP version did not achieve the success of its predecessor, although it was the first NOFX record to achieve a position on the Billboard charts, reaching number 63. Fat Mike stated: "Weird record. I thought it was the coolest record when we finished it, but a few months later I wasn't so sure. Some of those songs are kinda weird. I like the cover a lot though. I think it sold well in Belgium."

In 1997, the band released So Long and Thanks for All the Shoes, a return to faster punk, as exemplified by the frenetic opening track, "It's My Job to Keep Punk Rock Elite."

NOFX released The Decline, an 18-minute single-track extended play, which served as a fiery and cynical social commentary, in 1999. The Decline, clocking in at 18:23, is the second-longest punk song ever recorded (behind Crass' 20-minute song "Taking Sides").

=== 2000–2008: Move from Epitaph to Fat Wreck Chords ===
NOFX released its eighth studio album, Pump Up the Valuum, in 2000. It was the band's final album released through Epitaph, as the band decided to sign to Fat Mike's own label, Fat Wreck Chords.

In 2002, the band recorded BYO Split Series Volume III, a split album with Rancid, in which Rancid covered NOFX songs and NOFX covered Rancid songs.

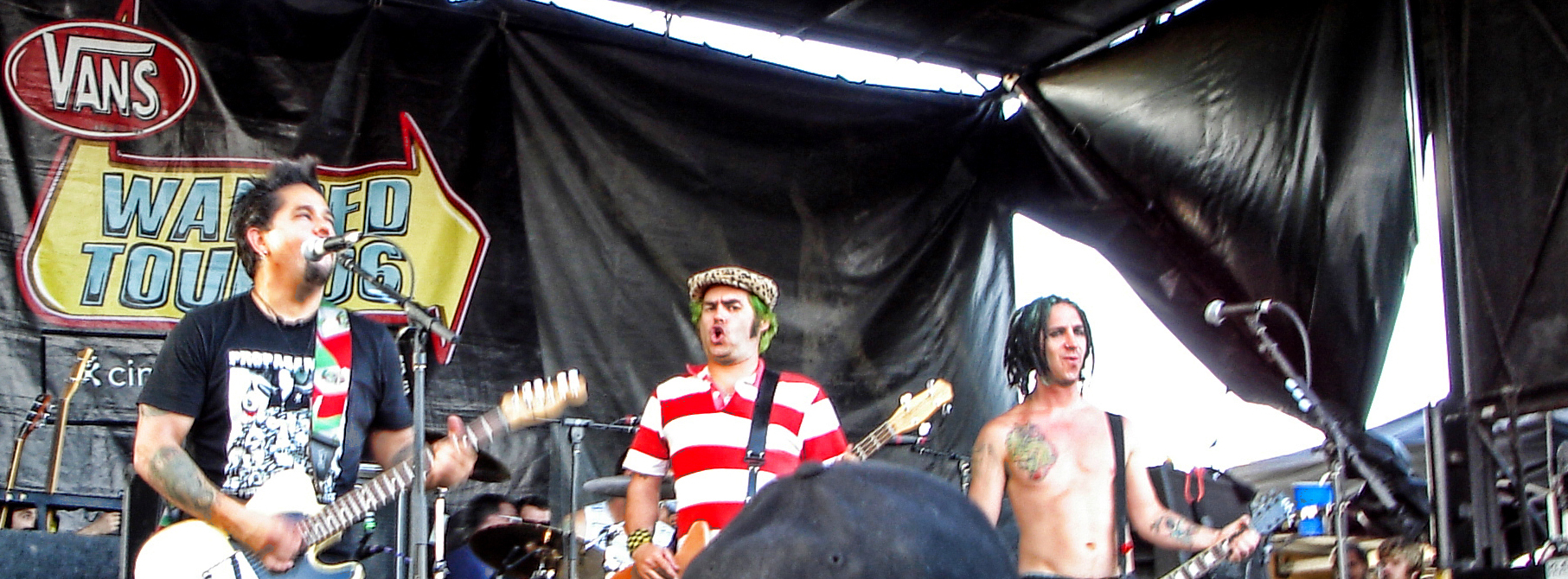
NOFX on Warped Tour '06

NOFX released its ninth studio album, The War on Errorism, in 2003, an album of political songs. It became the start of its anti-George W. Bush campaign. Fat Mike organized the website punkvoter.com, compiled two chart-topping Rock Against Bush albums, and started a Rock Against Bush U.S. tour. The song "Separation of Church and Skate" from the album was featured in the game Tony Hawk's Underground. In 2004, a previously unreleased demo version of their song "Concerns of a GOP Neo-Phyte" was contributed to the compilation album Take Action! Vol. 4.

In February 2005, the band launched the NOFX 7" of the Month Club, a subscription-based service, which saw the release of one new extended play almost monthly, from February 2005 to March 2006 (a total of 12 releases). The cover art for these extended plays was chosen from fan-submitted entries. The first 3,000 subscribers to the club received all of their records on colored vinyl. Fat Wreck Chords later released full sets of the extended plays.

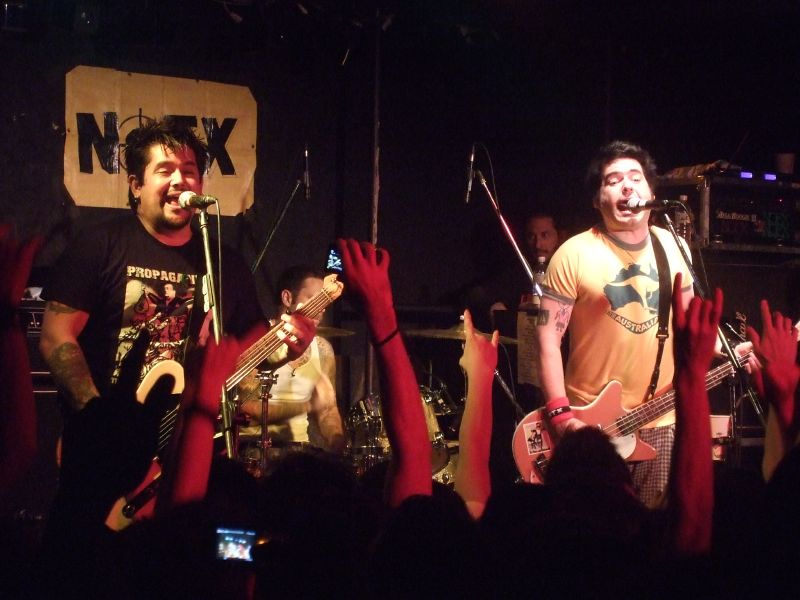
NOFX performing at "The Wall" in Taipei, Taiwan

On March 14, 2006, the EP Never Trust a Hippy was released. It was followed on April 18 by the studio album Wolves in Wolves' Clothing. On September 12, 2006, the video game EA Sports NHL 07 was released, featuring "Wolves in Wolves' Clothing" on its soundtrack, produced by Bill Stevenson and Fat Mike. NOFX's song "Kill All the White Man" was played briefly in the action movie Crank in 2006, and was credited as such in the film's soundtrack.

In January 2007, the band recorded three nights of performances in San Francisco, California, for their second live album, They've Actually Gotten Worse Live!, released November 20, 2007. The live album is described on the press release as "their sloppiest, drunkest, funniest, best sounding recording ever ... and they even made sure not to play any songs off their 1995 live album I Heard They Suck Live!!."

NOFX launched a world tour in September 2007, which was the basis for a documentary, NOFX: Backstage Passport, which aired on Fuse TV about its worldwide tour. The show was entitled NOFX: Backstage Passport.

=== 2009–2014: Coaster, Cokie the Clown and Self-Entitled ===
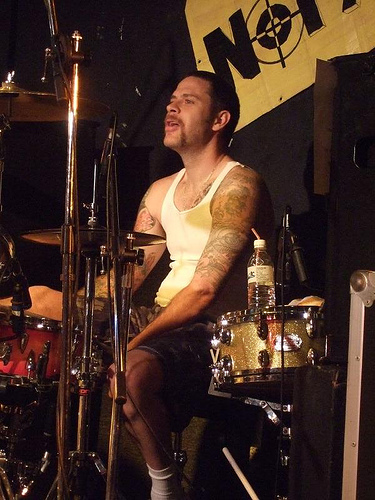
Founding member Erik Sandin

In February 2009, NOFX reunited with former members Steve Kidwiler and Dave Casillas for its 25th-anniversary special performances. They played three sold-out shows, one in San Diego, one in Hollywood, and one in S.F. NOFX released a new album, Coaster, on April 28, 2009. The band worked with the same co-producer, Bill Stevenson, who produced its previous album, Wolves in Wolves' Clothing. NOFX was also added to the lineup for the Warped Tour 2009. They also toured Australia and New Zealand in late 2009 with Bad Religion.

NOFX released a new extended play on November 24, 2009, titled Cokie the Clown. It was released on one CD or two seven-inch vinyl records, which are called Cokie the Clown and My Orphan Year. The extended play consists of outtakes from the Coaster sessions. NOFX started its spring 2010 "Fermented and Flailing" tour on April 21. This was the official tour for its album Coaster.

During this time period, Fat Mike would occasionally adopt the Cokie the Clown persona (as seen on the extended play's cover and the "Cokie the Clown" music video) during live performances. Fat Mike performed a solo acoustic performance on March 20, 2010, at the SXSW Festival as Cokie, which was described as "strange, emotional, and intimate." At the end of the concert, after debuting a new song called "Drinking Pee", a video that was played for the audience suggested that a number of festival participants unknowingly drank Fat Mike's urine. The stunt resulted in Fat Mike getting banned from the Austin, Texas, venue, Emo's. In May 2010, NOFX posted a video online that showed Fat Mike urinating into a bottle of Patrón as was previously announced, but then switching the bottle before going on stage to a bottle not containing any urine. Months later in an interview, Mike stated that he had "always wanted to be banned from somewhere."

On June 21, 2010, NOFX announced that they were going to release a compilation album titled The Longest EP, a compilation of selected songs from its extended plays from 1987 to 2009. It was released on August 17, 2010.

On November 23, 2010, Fat Wreck Chords released NOFX / The Spits, a split EP with the Seattle, Washington, band the Spits. It contained two new songs from each band.

In a January 2011 interview with The Daily Times, Fat Mike revealed that a new NOFX album was in production, saying "There are some really good songs on Coaster, but after having written 300 songs, I feel lucky I came up with them. That's why there are songs on there about Iron Maiden and Tegan and Sara. I'm reaching, man. Sometimes I grab stuff just to grab stuff, and I'm going in a lot of different directions." In December 2011, Fat Mike revealed to Phoenix New Times that he has begun work on a new NOFX album and a soundtrack to a "fetish film" called Rubber Bordello.

In June 2011, NOFX began their Great White North Tour, which would have them traveling across Canada. The tour kicked off in St. John's, Newfoundland, on June 14. It was the first time the band had been to Newfoundland.

Along with a self-titled 10" of 1980s hardcore punk cover songs, the band also planned to re-release their first recordings in the summer of 2011. The 10" features covers from the Necros and D.O.A. and songs such as "Police Brutality" and "Race Riot." The album was released on a vinyl record and has been distributed to independent record companies around the U.S., Great Britain, and elsewhere.

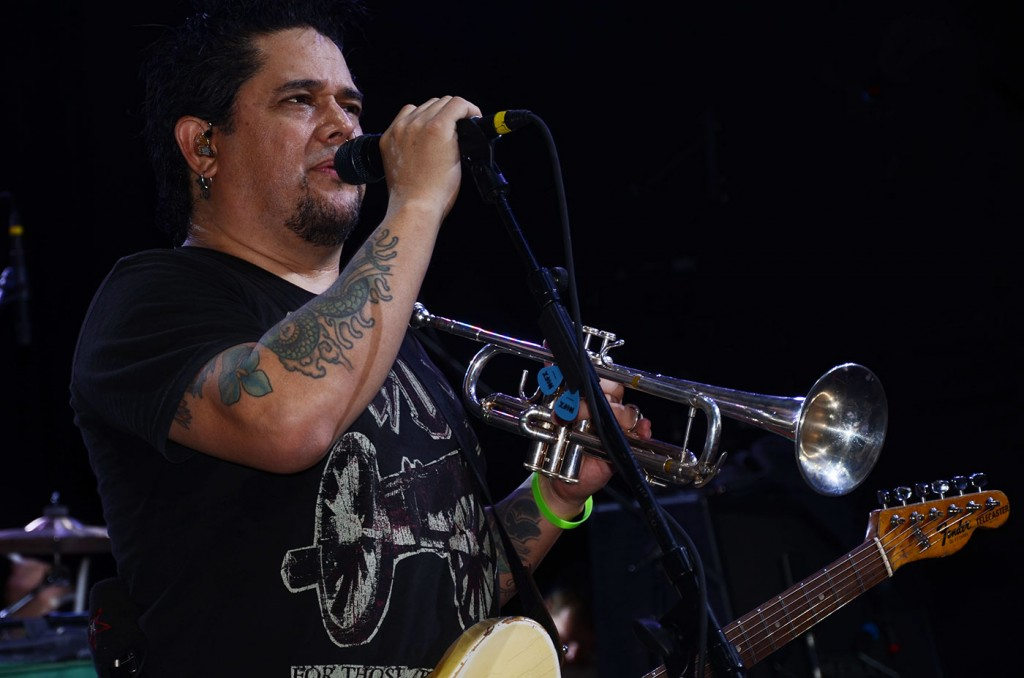
Guitarist and trumpeter El Hefe joined the band in 1991.

On February 14, 2012, in an article on Rolling Stone's website, Fat Mike said that a new album was on the way. "We're recording in April, and it should be out in the fall. I've got 12 songs, but I don't have a name for it, and only a few of the songs are finished," he says. "We're demo-ing it right now."

A 7" single, My Stepdad's a Cop and My Stepmom's a Domme, featuring new songs recorded prior to the sessions for Self Entitled, was released in June 2012.

NOFX released their twelfth studio album, Self Entitled, on September 11, 2012. NOFX also released X'mas Has Been X'd on January 15, 2013, and their 30th anniversary LP box set on February 19, 2013.

NOFX toured in Australia starting November 5, 2014. They performed in Sydney, Newcastle, New South Wales, Wollongong, Brisbane, Darwin, Northern Territory, Adelaide, Perth, Melbourne, Geelong, and Gold Coast, Queensland.

=== 2015–2020: First Ditch Effort and singles ===
NOFX toured the United States in the summer of 2015 celebrating the 25th anniversary of Fat Wreck Chords. Supporting acts for this tour were Lagwagon, Me First and the Gimme Gimmes, Strung Out, Propagandhi, Swingin' Utters, Bracket, ToyGuitar, the Flatliners, Masked Intruder and Bad Cop/Bad Cop. Guitarist El Hefe said that NOFX was going to work on new music after the Fat Wreck Chords 25th anniversary tour. On their tour to Europe, NOFX stated their new album would be out in September 2016. On July 19, 2016, the band's thirteenth studio album, First Ditch Effort, was announced, to be released on October 7; the lead single "Six Years on Dope" was released the same day. On April 17, 2016, they released their autobiography, called NOFX: The Hepatitis Bathtub and Other Stories. During the tour, named the Hepatitis Bathtub Tour, they did book signings on some dates. On December 16 a special hard-covered edition with a seven-inch four-song vinyl (titled Hepatitis Bathtub) and a bath towel was also released.

In March 2018, NOFX released a new single "There's No 'Too Soon' if Time Is Relative", in tribute to physicist Stephen Hawking, who had died days earlier. The track had been recorded a month prior to its release. Several days later, they announced the first annual "Camp Punk in Drublic Festival" in Legend Valley in Thornville, Ohio. The three-day event was to feature NOFX alongside Rancid, Pennywise, the Mighty Mighty Bosstones and Me First and the Gimme Gimmes. In a May 2018 interview, Fat Mike hinted that NOFX was working on new material.

In February 2019, Fat Mike announced the NOFX 7" of the Month Club, a new subscription-based service scheduled for the release of 12 new extended plays almost monthly. As with the previous 2005 installment, the cover art for these extended plays was chosen from fan-submitted entries.

On August 16, 2019, NOFX released a new single, "Fish in a Gun Barrel". The song was written in response to mass shootings in America, with proceeds from the single going to anti-gun-violence charity Moms Demand Action.

On March 23, 2020, NOFX released a video for another new song, "PRBOD". A few days later, the band released a video for "another new song that didn't make it on the new album" called "The Oddition".

=== 2021–2025: Single Album, Double Album and retirement ===
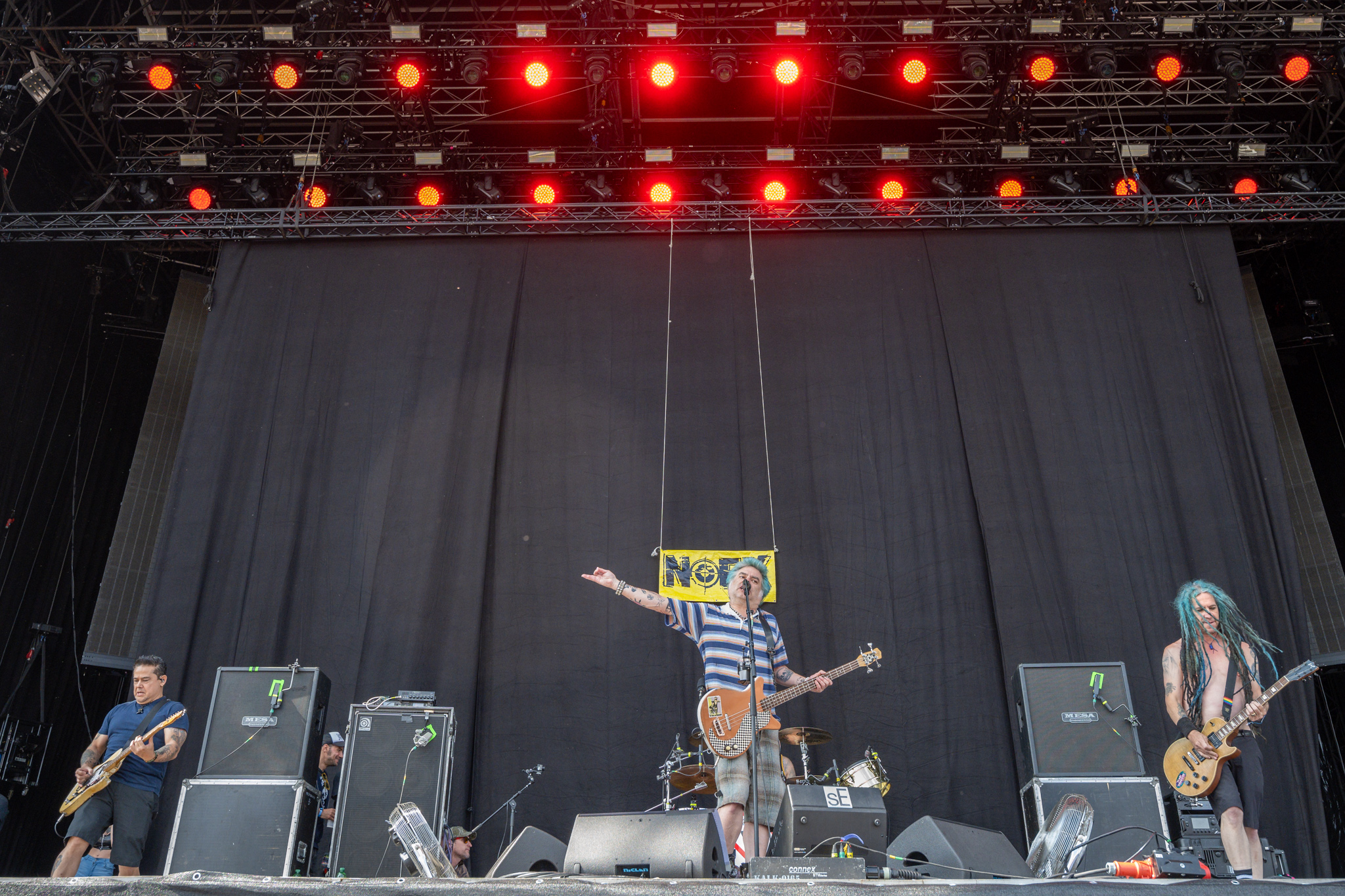
NOFX performing at Rock im Park (2023).

On January 12, 2021, NOFX announced that they would release their first studio album in nearly five years, Single Album, on February 26.

On September 1, 2022, Fat Mike confirmed in a reply to a comment in an Instagram post that NOFX would be disbanding in 2023, the year of the band's 40th anniversary, and suggested that their final show may take place in their hometown of Los Angeles, California.

On September 27, 2022, NOFX announced their next album, Double Album, would come out on December 2, 2022. They released the single "Darby Crashing," a reworked version of a song from their 2019-2020 7 inch of the Month Club, on the same day.

NOFX also announced three in-progress albums: Half Album, Everybody Else Is Insane, and NOFX: A–Z. On March 6, 2024, Half Album was revealed to be an EP, which was released on April 19, 2024, and the band released the single "I'm a Rat".

NOFX played their final ever live shows after 41 years of performing live from October 4–6, 2024 in San Pedro, California. During their final show on October 6, NOFX played a new song that they had never performed live before or even released, "We Did It Our Way", as their penultimate song in the show. Fat Mike described it as their "thank you" to fans and everyone onstage.

On July 9, 2025, a NOFX single titled "Barcelona" was released on streaming services. Although the song dates back to 2013, it "is the newest and last NOFX song written and recorded post-NOFX's final shows", and was featured on the band's compilation album A-H, which was released on December 19, 2025.

=== 2026–present: 40 Years of Fuckin' Up ===
On January 29, 2026, the band released a new track, "Minnesota Nazis" which was a re-working of their song "Huntington Beach Nazis". The song was re-written to support protests against ICE violence in Minnesota.

A documentary film chronicling the history of the band and their final tour, 40 Years of Fuckin' Up, was released in 2026. The film was accompanied by a soundtrack album, which released on August 28, 2026. The album included the band's final two songs: "40 Years of Fuckin' Up" and "We Did It Our Way" as well as a cover of "La Bamba" and a joke song "We're Bros".Regarding both the film and its accompanying soundtrack, El Hefe stated that they are: "A proper send-off. A final stamp. And honestly, the response has floored me. I had no idea how deep our music ran with people all over the world. Seeing all that love come back to us as we close this chapter, it's been incredible. Really humbling. And I don't say that lightly."

After several film festival appearances across 2026, 40 Years of Fuckin' Up will be screened at over 200 movie theatres over two nights on August 23 and August 26, 2026, with no plans for the film to appear on any streaming services. Discussing the film's cinema-only release strategy, Fat Mike stated: "Now that NOFX has retired, I want our fans to have some place to go. There’s a lot of bands who are still playing who would want their movie to be streamed so anyone with a TV or computer can watch it, and maybe they’ll get bigger. But getting bigger right now is not really gonna help us. We’re not playing shows, so how about we do something cool? That’s what we’ve always tried to do." The film's director James Buddy Day elaborated: "Fat Mike’s vision for the movie is that you must experience it with the punk rock community, with friends, with drinks, with partying. It’s something that must be experienced together and shared. [...] We set out to create something you would enjoy in a public space, like a concert. We’re going to expand that and show it in other venues, maybe in places you wouldn’t expect to see a movie play, but our goal is to keep it communal forever and to make this experience last for as long as it can last for.”

Upon watching the film's interviews with his bandmates, Fat Mike later noted that the experience “was one of the worst days in my life. They really had a lot to get off their chests about me. All three of them talked so much shit about me and my drug use and how that ruined the band and that’s why we broke up... which is not at all the case. I didn’t know they felt that way, and I was so upset I didn’t know what to do. I wanted to take all that stuff out. Then my wife told me, ‘Michael, don’t take it all out, and do not defend yourself. Just show what you guys did and what you accomplished, and if people don’t like that you do drugs, well, fuck them.'" Fat Mike confirmed that there were tensions between the four band members following their final tour's completion, with Eric Melvin accusing Fat Mike of "embezzling funds" via his attorney: "No one in the band will speak to him because of that. [...] He’s still going after me. What’s funny is the three of us — me and Hefe and Smelly — are really closer than we’ve ever been. We talk a lot, and it’s just more fun and natural. We don’t need a new album out now or we don’t need to do this or that. We’re just having fun.”

Fat Mike confirmed that the band had been recording a final studio album, stating: "[The songs] may come out, but I just kinda got soured by that Eric Melvin situation so I feel weird about it." Fat Mike, Smelly and El Hefe are currently writing and recording together under a "different moniker".

== Musical style and influences ==
NOFX's music is characterized by "hooky tunes and a snarky sense of humor", according to John Bush of AllMusic. Critics have labeled the band's style as primarily punk rock, melodic hardcore, skate punk, ska punk, and pop-punk. Fat Mike, in a 2021 Spin interview, identified NOFX as a melodic hardcore band, rejecting critics' labeling of the band's style as pop-punk.

The band cites its influences as Bad Religion, Rich Kids on LSD, D.I., SNFU, Operation Ivy, the Descendents, the Circle Jerks, the Dead Milkmen, the Ramones, the Sex Pistols, Adrenalin O.D., Minor Threat, the Germs, Suicidal Tendencies, Black Flag, the Dead Kennedys, the Adolescents, the Misfits, and the Subhumans.

== Controversy ==
In 2018, the band attracted significant controversy after statements by Fat Mike and rhythm guitarist Eric Melvin during a concert in Las Vegas on May 30, 2018. Referencing the 2017 Las Vegas shooting, Melvin stated "I guess you only get shot in Vegas if you're in a country band," and Mike replied with "You know, that [massacre] sucked, but least they were country fans and not punk rock fans." The lead sponsor of the Punk in Drublic festival, Stone Brewing Co., pulled support from the festival as well as from NOFX's line of craft beer. NOFX and Me First and the Gimme Gimmes were subsequently removed from the festival's lineup.

The band later apologized, stating, "What we said in Vegas was shitty and insensitive and we are all embarrassed by our remarks." In June 2018 the band stated that all of their U.S. concerts had been canceled and they had been "effectively banned" from playing in the United States due to the comments. However, Fat Mike later clarified otherwise, stating that "Our promoter canceled — my partner [not the venues]."

== Band members ==
Final lineup

- "Fat" Mike Burkett – bass, keyboards, piano, occasional guitar (1983–2024); lead vocals (1983–1986, 1986–2024)
- Eric Melvin – rhythm guitar, accordion, backing and occasional lead vocals, occasional bass (1983–2024); lead guitar (1983–1987)
- Erik "Smelly" Sandin – drums, percussion (1983–1985, 1986–2024)
- Aaron "El Hefe" Abeyta – lead guitar, trumpet, trombone, backing and occasional lead vocals (1991–2024)

Other members

- Scott Sellers – drums (1985)
- Scott Aldahl – drums (1986)
- Dave Allen – lead vocals (1986; died 1986)
- Dave Casillas – lead guitar (1987–1989)
- Steve Kidwiler – lead guitar, backing and occasional lead vocals (1989–1991)

Touring musicians

- Limo - keyboards (unknown–2016)
- Karina Deniké – keyboards, backing vocals (2015–2024)
- Jon “J Grabes” Graber – additional guitar, backing vocals (2021–2024)

== Discography ==
Studio albums

- Liberal Animation (1988)
- S&M Airlines (1989)
- Ribbed (1991)
- White Trash, Two Heebs and a Bean (1992)
- Punk in Drublic (1994)
- Heavy Petting Zoo (1996)
- So Long and Thanks for All the Shoes (1997)
- Pump Up the Valuum (2000)
- The War on Errorism (2003)
- Wolves in Wolves' Clothing (2006)
- Coaster (2009)
- Self Entitled (2012)
- First Ditch Effort (2016)
- Single Album (2021)
- Double Album (2022)

== Bibliography ==
- NOFX; Alulis, Jeff (2016). NOFX: The Hepatitis Bathtub and Other Stories. Da Capo Press. 368pp. ISBN 978-0306825675.
