= Fat Mike =

American musician (born 1967)

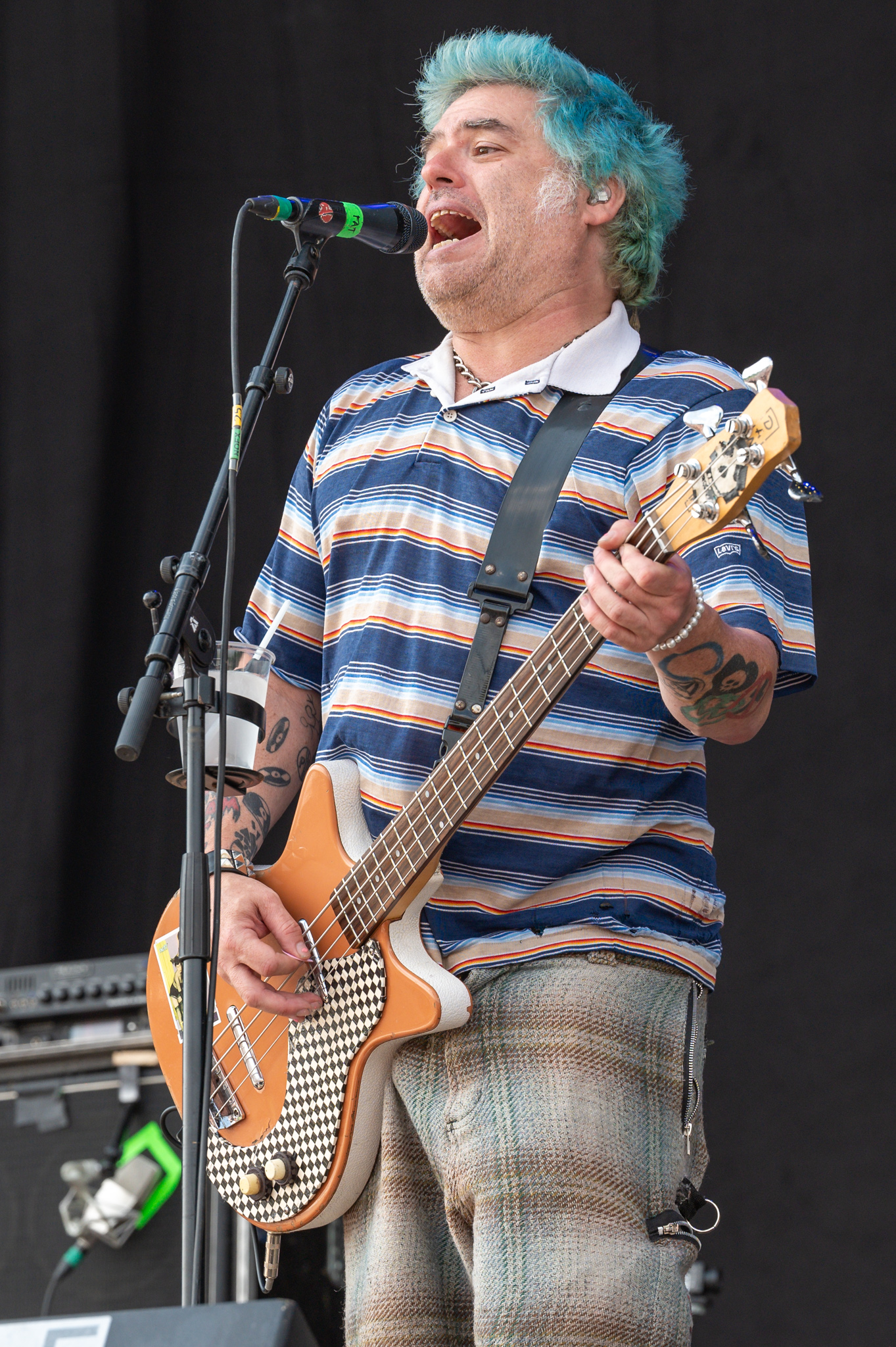
- Fat Mike with NOFX at Rock im Park 2023

Background information
- Also known as: Cokie the Clown
- Born: Michael John Burkett; January 16, 1967 (age 59); Newton, Massachusetts, U.S.
- Origin: Los Angeles, California, U.S.
- Genres: Punk rock; skate punk; ska punk; melodic hardcore; hardcore punk; pop-punk
- Occupations: Musician; producer
- Instruments: Vocals; bass
- Years active: 1983–present
- Member of: Codefendants
- Formerly of: NOFX; False Alarm; Me First and the Gimme Gimmes
- Website: fatmikedude.com

Michael John Burkett (born January 16, 1967), known professionally as Fat Mike, is an American musician and producer. He was the bassist and lead vocalist for the punk rock band NOFX and the cofounder and bassist of the punk rock supergroup cover band Me First and the Gimme Gimmes. Burkett started out with his first band False Alarm in 1982. He and NOFX rhythm guitarist Eric Melvin were the only band members who remained constant in the band's lineup throughout its existence. Burkett was the owner and founder of Fat Wreck Chords.

Fat Mike plays bass with a guitar pick.

== Early life and influences ==
Fat Mike attended college at San Francisco State University and graduated in 1990 with a bachelor's degree in Social Science and a minor in Human Sexuality. According to the book NOFX The Hepatitis Bathtub and Other Stories, Burkett received the moniker "Fat Mike" from "one of the guys from [the band] Subculture". He is a Jewish atheist.

He credits Joe Escalante of the Vandals for introducing him to punk rock when he was 13 at a summer camp.

== Musical career ==
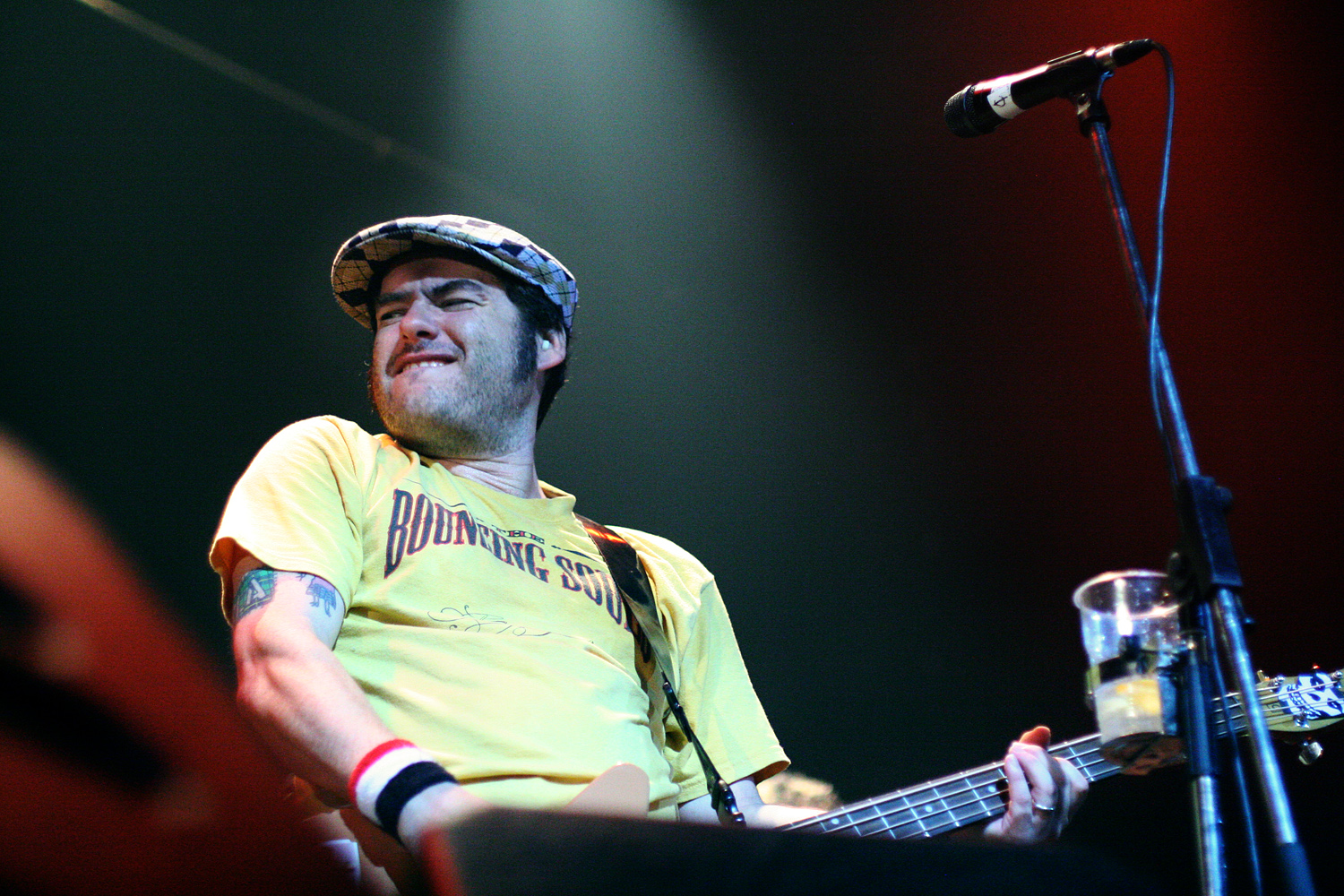
Fat Mike performing in 2007

While attending Beverly Hills High School, Burkett began his musical career with the band False Alarm. After the band split up in 1983, he met Eric Melvin and Erik Sandin and formed the original line-up of NOFX. He has also appeared as a guest-vocalist on a number of other bands' tracks including "Peter Brady" on Screeching Weasel's 1993 album, Anthem for a New Tomorrow. Other appearances include "Beware" by Randy, "Mr. Coffee" and "Lazy" by Lagwagon. Burkett can also be heard heckling and requesting "Free Bird" at the end of the Lunachicks song, "Missed It," off their 1996 album, Pretty Ugly, which he also produced. He also appears as a guest vocalist on the Dropkick Murphys single "Going Out In Style".

Burkett recorded the Cokie the Clown EP with NOFX, playing Cokie on both the cover of the EP and the music video for the title-track, "Cokie the Clown". In the video, Burkett dresses as Cokie and puts white powder into his squirting flower, which in the song he describes as "my own special blend of X, coke, and K". Cokie then walks around Chicago squirting powder in pedestrians' faces, as chronicled in the song itself. The video was shot during the punk music festival Riot Fest.

Fat Mike has made several appearances as Cokie the Clown, but one of his most memorable was at Emo's, a popular nightclub in Austin on March 20, 2010, at the South by Southwest festival. He recounted several graphic and disturbing stories about his life, and played several songs both previously released and unreleased. He also tricked several members of the audience into drinking tequila, before showing them a video of himself filling a partially full bottle of tequila to the top with urine to shocked reactions. The stunt was later revealed as a joke on NOFX's website, which showed Fat Mike switching out the urine bottle for an untainted one before making audience members drink it. Burkett has since been banned from Emo's. However, in NOFX's autobiography Burkett claims that the urine was indeed served to the audience.

In 2015 Burkett premiered a musical titled Home Street Home which he co-wrote with Soma Snakeoil and Jeff Marx.

In 2019, Fat Mike released a solo album, in the character of Cokie the Clown, titled You're Welcome. The album features Fat Mike as Cokie as well as Dizzy Reed (Guns N' Roses) and Travis Barker (blink 182).

=== Codefendants ===
Codefendants
- Genres: Punk rock; punk rap; new wave; experimental music
- Years active: 2021–present
- Members: Ceschi; Sam King; Fat Mike

In 2021, Burkett formed his newest project Codefendants, alongside fellow punk rock musicians Ceschi and Sam King of Get Dead. The group seeks to break genre barriers and produces a mix of hip hop music, new wave, and punk rock.

== Activism ==
=== Punkvoter.com ===
Fat Mike founded the website Punkvoter.com in 2004 in an effort to mobilize the punk community to vote George W. Bush out of office in that year's presidential election. He had never been very active in politics before then, admitting that he never even voted until 2000. However, he was driven into political activism because of Bush, whom he viewed as "the most ridiculous president in the history of presidents." Punkvoter.com targeted 18-to-25-year-old punk fans and other disenfranchised young people and encouraged them to vote Bush out of office. At its peak, the site was getting 15 million hits a day and ultimately raised over $1 million.

=== Rock Against Bush ===
As with Punkvoter.com, Mike organized the Rock Against Bush campaign to mobilize punk fans and musicians against President George W. Bush. Fat Mike's band NOFX, along with many other well-known punk artists including Alkaline Trio, Green Day, and Jello Biafra, embarked on a tour of American college campuses in the months leading up to the 2004 presidential election. Mike hoped to go beyond just protest and actually educate kids about why they should vote against Bush. At the shows, he would hand out free DVDs of Uncovered: The Whole Truth About The Iraq War, a documentary that questions the Bush administration's motives in the Middle East. To coincide with the tour, Mike released two Rock Against Bush compilation albums on Fat Wreck Chords featuring new music from some of the bands on the label. The albums sold over 650,000 copies and proceeds helped fund the tour, as well as going toward magazine ads and billboards in swing states.

== Personal life ==
Burkett lives in Las Vegas, Nevada.

He and his wife Erin divorced in 2010 after 18 years of marriage. They have a daughter named Darla. In October 2009, Mike appeared in the documentary The Other F Word, an analysis of punk rock fatherhood.

Fat Mike formerly owned a gastropub-style restaurant in the Park Slope neighborhood of Brooklyn, New York City called Thistle Hill Tavern. He has been into BDSM for years, and has had a dungeon in his house. Fat Mike has numerous tattoos, including one on his left arm that features a golfing dominatrix and her bound caddy. When discussing the NOFX song "Fuck Euphemism", for which he wrote the lyrics, he discussed how he describes himself as queer: "I live a BDSM lifestyle and I'm a crossdresser, so it did bother me when people were calling me a cis male. I like the whole thing of defining yourself using your own terms, because I'm a punk rocker first, and then a submissive crossdressing male. The transgender community and the gay community are taking a stance on how we want to be known, and I'm going to be known as a certain way."

Fat Mike announced his engagement to adult film actress Soma Snakeoil on January 28, 2014. Mike and Soma separated August 2017.

He has been vocal about assisting with his terminally ill mother's death, describing the episode in a song called "La Pieta" which is featured in NOFX's audiobook version of The Hepatitis Bathtub and Other Stories.

In 2014, Burkett started Fatale, a brand of panties marketed towards men.

Fat Mike has self-diagnosed as autistic. He has discussed this with his doctor, who reportedly told him that he was too compassionate to be autistic.

=== Assault incident ===
On November 5, 2014, at a NOFX show in Sydney, Australia, Fat Mike had complained about a neck injury and had asked the audience not to throw objects at him and grab him while on stage as it caused him pain. While playing the song "Linoleum", a fan climbed onstage and put his arm around Mike's neck, to which Mike responded by elbowing him to the ground and then kicking him in the face. The fan suffered some bruising on his face but had no major injuries.

Later, Fat Mike and the fan both apologized via Twitter. A video was released of Mike giving the fan a beer and custom T-shirt and letting him kick him with a fluffy slipper as an apology. This incident happened three years after Fat Mike kicked Screeching Weasel off his Fat Wreck Chords record label because of an assault incident involving Ben Weasel and a female fan at SXSW in Austin, Texas. Fat Mike said of the Screeching Weasel incident, "I think it's horrible because he punched someone who's smaller and weaker than him."

== Discography ==
As Cokie the Clown

- You're Welcome (2019)

With Codefendants

- This Is Crime Wave (2023)
- Lifers (2026)
