= Face to Face discography =

Discography of Southern California-based punk rock band Face to Face

- Studio albums: 10
- Extended plays: 8
- Live albums: 3
- Compilation albums: 2
- Singles: 17
- Music videos: 11

This is a comprehensive discography of Face to Face, a Southern California-based punk rock band. The band has released eleven full-length studio albums (counting a covers album), eight EPs, two split albums, one official live recording, one compilation album, eleven music videos and twelve singles. This list is not intended to include material performed by members or former members of Face to Face that was recorded with Legion of Doom, Me First and the Gimme Gimmes, No Use for a Name, The Offspring, Pulley, Saves the Day, 22 Jacks, Viva Death, Red Faced, or Real Space Noise.

== Biography ==
Face to Face traces its beginnings back to 1988 when singer/guitarist Trever Keith, bassist Matt Riddle, and drummer Rob Kurth formed a local metal band called Zero Tolerance. After forming, Kurth's friend Mark Haake joined the group in 1989 as an additional guitarist for a couple of months before getting orders to the Middle East with the Air Force. Although no formal studio recordings of Zero Tolerance exist, they had recorded a handful of demo tapes. As a three-piece, the band played a show at Spanky's in Riverside, California, and a couple of other local shows. When Haake left, the band continued as a three-piece and changed their name to Face to Face in 1991.

In late 1991, Face to Face were signed to a local punk rock record label Dr. Strange Records. Dr. Strange issued the band's first single "No Authority" and their first studio album Don't Turn Away, which was released in 1992. Copies of Don't Turn Away sold quickly and Dr. Strange was unable to keep up with the demand, so Keith contacted NOFX's Fat Mike of Fat Wreck Chords to re-release it with wider distribution. In addition to re-releasing the album, Fat Wreck Chords released "Disconnected" as a 7" single in August 1993. Also in 1993, just after a three-week tour in Germany supporting their labelmates Lagwagon, Face to Face added Chad Yaro as an additional guitarist. Before the band could begin work on Don't Turn Away's follow-up, they made a decision to go with a new label that had major-label distribution. The label, Victory Music, signed them and then they entered the studio with producer Thom Wilson (of The Offspring fame) and began recording their second album, entitled Big Choice. The label was nervous about their distribution deal and wanted a test release to run through the system, and issued an EP of songs from 7"s and other rarities called Over It.

A&M Records signed the band and re-released Big Choice in 1995, yielding a minor hit on the L.A. local radio station KROQ with the re-recording of "Disconnected". After touring with bands such as NOFX, The Mighty Mighty Bosstones, and The Offspring during 1995, Riddle left Face to Face and went on to play in 22 Jacks and Pulley before settling on No Use for a Name. The band replaced Riddle with a then-unknown bassist named Scott Shiflett. Face to Face returned to the studio in 1996 to record another album for their label, resulting in their self-titled fourth album, which was a moderate success. To promote the album, the band joined the Warped Tour in 1997.

After promoting the self-titled album, longtime drummer Rob Kurth left the band in early 1998. To finish out the touring cycle for the self-titled album, the band replaced Kurth with Jose Medeles, who was out with them on a co-headlining US tour with the Reverend Horton Heat band, before taking a break to write and record their next album. After 25 different drummers were auditioned to replace Kurth, the band finally found Pete Parada. After the release of two more albums, Ignorance Is Bliss (1999) and Reactionary (2000), Yaro departed from Face to Face in 2001. Instead of hiring a replacement for him, the band decided to continue as a three piece.

After the release of one more album, How to Ruin Everything (2002), Face to Face decided to call it quits, and embarked on a farewell tour in 2004. The band released a holiday song "Merry Xmas" on the 2004 Kevin and Bean album Christmastime in the 909. After breaking up, Keith had been active in the mashup group Legion of Doom, among other bands such as Shiflett's brainchild Viva Death and a solo project called Pablum. Yaro had been missing from the public eye after his 2001 departure from Face to Face. After leaving Saves the Day, Parada joined The Offspring in 2007, replacing Atom Willard, During the recording of their new studio album at the time.

After a four-year hiatus, Face to Face reunited in January 2008 for select shows in the US and internationally. In April of that year, they performed together for the first time since breaking up at The Glasshouse in Pomona, California, and have continued to perform numerous live venues since. The band released Laugh Now, Laugh Later, their first album in 9 years, on May 17, 2011.

== Studio albums ==
Year	Title	Comments
1992	Don't Turn Away: Label: Dr Strange Records; Formats: CD, Vinyl LP, Cassette	Debut studio album.; Re-released in 1993 by Fat Wreck Chords.
1995	Big Choice: Label: Victory Music; Formats: CD, Vinyl LP, Cassette	Re-released in 1995 by A&M Records, marking Face to Face's first release on a major label.; First album recorded with Chad Yaro on guitar, and last album recorded with Matt Riddle on bass.
1996	Face to Face: Label: A&M Records; Released: September 10, 1996; Formats: CD, Vinyl LP, Cassette	First release on A&M Records.; First album with Scott Shiflett on bass, and last album with Rob Kurth on drums.
1999	Ignorance Is Bliss: Label: Beyond Music; Released: July 27, 1999; Formats: CD, Cassette Tape	First album with Pete Parada on drums.
1999	Standards & Practices: Label: Vagrant Records; Formats: CD, Cassette Tape	Covers album.; This album was recorded at the same time as Ignorance Is Bliss and self-released at the same time. It was re-released in 2001 on Vagrant Records. The UK version includes 2 bonus tracks.
2000	Reactionary: Label: Vagrant Records; Released: June 6, 2000; Formats: CD, Vinyl LP	Last album recorded with Yaro on guitar.
2002	How to Ruin Everything: Label: Vagrant Records; Released: April 9, 2002; Formats: CD, Vinyl LP	Final album before disbanding.; The only Face to Face album thus far recorded without Yaro since Don't Turn Away.
2011	Laugh Now, Laugh Later: Released: May 17, 2011; Label: People Like You Records; Formats: CD, LP, Digital Download	First album since their reunion.; First album with Yaro on guitar in 11 years.
2013	Three Chords and a Half Truth: Released: April 9, 2013; Label: Rise Records; Formats: CD, LP, Digital Download	Last album recorded with Yaro
2016	Protection: Released: March 4, 2016; Label: Fat Wreck Chords; Formats: CD, LP, Digital Download	First Album recorded with Dennis Hill on guitar
2020	Standards & Practices, Vol. II: Released: October 16, 2020; Label: Antagonist; Formats: LP, Digital Download	Covers album
2021	No Way Out But Through: Released: September 10, 2021; Label: Fat Wreck Chords; Formats: CD, LP, Digital Download	

== Live albums ==
Year	Title	Comments
1995	Combat Zone: Label: Unofficial Release; Format: CD	Live from Philadelphia. Soundboard recording.
1998	Live: Label: Vagrant Records; Format: CD	Recorded live in Los Angeles in September 1997.
2019	Live in a Dive: Released: October 18, 2019; Label: Fat Wreck Chords; Format: CD, LP	Part of the Live in a Dive series

== EPs ==
Year	Title	Comments
1994	Over It: Label: Victory Music; Format: CD, 10-inch vinyl	
1994	Split w/Horace Pinker: Label: Rhetoric Records; Format: 7-inch vinyl	Split EP with Horace Pinker.
1996	Econo Live: Label: Vagrant Records.; Format: 10-inch vinyl	
1999	So Why Aren't You Happy?: Format: CD	Reissued as bonus tracks on Ignorance Is Bliss
2002	Split w/Dropkick Murphys: Label: Vagrant Records; Format: CD	Split EP with Dropkick Murphys.
2011	Split w/Rise Against: Label: Folsom Records; Format: 7-inch vinyl	Split EP with Rise Against.
2012	All For Nothing: Label: Antagonist / People Like You Records; Format: 10-inch vinyl	
2013	The Other Half: Label: Rise Records; Format: 10-inch vinyl	Special release for Record Store Day.

== Compilation albums ==
Year	Title	Comments
2001	Everything Is Everything: Label: Kung Fu Records; Released: 2001; Format: CD, DVD	
2005	Shoot the Moon: Essential Collection: Label: Antagonist Records; Released: November 1, 2005; Format: CD	Released after Face to Face's Break Up.
2018	Hold Fast: Acoustic Sessions: Released: July 27, 2018; Label: Fat Wreck Chords; Formats: CD, LP, Digital Download	Acoustic studio album with new version of previously released songs.
2020	Standards & Practices, Vol II: Released: October 17, 2020; Label: Antagonist Records; Formats: CD, LP, Digital Download	Covers album.

== Singles ==
Year	Title	Album	Music video?
1992	"No Authority"	Don't Turn Away	No
1993	"Disconnected"	Don't Turn Away	Yes
1995	“A-OK”	Big Choice	No
1995	"Debt"	Big Choice	Yes
1996	"Paint It Black"	Non-album track	No
1996	"I Won't Lie Down"	Face to Face	Yes
1996	“Ordinary”	Face to Face	No
1998	“Blind”	Face to Face	No
1999	"God Is a Man"	Ignorance Is Bliss	Yes
2000	"Disappointed"	Reactionary	Yes
2002	"The New Way"	How to Ruin Everything	Yes
2011	"It's Not All About You"	Laugh Now, Laugh Later	Yes
2013	"Right As Rain"	Three Chords And A Half Truth	Yes
2016	"Bent But Not Broken"	Protection	Yes
2016	"Double Crossed"	Protection	Yes
2021	"No Way Out But Through	No Way Out But Through	No
2021	"Farewell Song"	No Way Out But Through	No
