= Hold Fast: Acoustic Sessions =

Studio album by Face to Face
- Released: July 27, 2018
- Genre: Acoustic punk
- Length: 33:08
- Label: Fat Wreck Chords
- Producer: Mike Brown

Face to Face chronology
Protection (2016)	Hold Fast: Acoustic Sessions (2018)	Live in a Dive (2019)

Professional ratings
Review scores
Source	Rating
BeatRoute	(favourable)
The Fire Note	3.5/5 stars

Hold Fast: Acoustic Sessions is the eleventh studio album by the American punk band Face to Face. Hold Fast was released on July 27, 2018 by Fat Wreck Chords on CD and LP. The album consists of ten new acoustic versions of popular Face to Face songs from previous albums, spanning the band's entire career.

== Background ==
On 30 May 2018 it was announced by Fat Wreck Chords that Face to Face would put out a new album called Hold Fast: Acoustic Sessions on July 27 that year. A song of the new album, "Disconnected", was released the same day.

An acoustic US tour to support the upcoming album was announced on 7 June. A new song called "Keep Your Chin Up" was released the same day.

On 20 July, a week before the official release of the album, "All for Nothing" was released. A music video for the song was released later that year.

== Track listing ==
1. "All for Nothing" - 3:08 (originally recorded for Laugh Now, Laugh Later, 2011)
2. "Disconnected" - 4:04 (originally recorded for Don't Turn Away, 1992)
3. "Shame On Me" - 3:21 (originally recorded for Reactionary, 2000)
4. "Keep Your Chin Up" - 3:40 (originally recorded for Protection, 2016)
5. "Velocity" - 3:17 (originally recorded for Big Choice, 1995)
6. "AOK" - 3:37 (originally recorded for Big Choice, 1995)
7. "Don't Turn Away" - 2:48 (originally recorded for Don't Turn Away, 1992)
8. "Blind" - 3:25 (originally recorded for Face to Face, 1996)
9. "Ordinary" - 2:53 (originally recorded for Face to Face, 1996)
10. "Bill of Goods" - 2:54 (originally recorded for How to Ruin Everything, 2002)

== Personnel ==
- Trever Keith - lead vocals, guitar
- Scott Shiflett - bass, backing vocals
- Dennis Hill - guitar, backing vocals
- Danny Thompson - drums, backing vocals

== Charts ==
Chart (2018)	Peak position
US Independent Albums (Billboard)	27
US Heatseekers Albums (Billboard)	10
