= Live in a Dive (Face to Face album) =

Live album by Face to Face
- Released: October 18, 2019
- Recorded: March 2019
- Venue: Saint Vitus Bar
- Genre: Punk rock
- Length: 38:59
- Label: Fat Wreck Chords

Face to Face chronology
Hold Fast: Acoustic Sessions (2018)	Live in a Dive (2019)	No Way Out But Through (2021)

Live in a Dive chronology
NOFX (2018)	Face to Face (2019)	Rich Kids on LSD (2022)

Live in a Dive is an album by American punk rock band Face to Face; it is the band's third live album and the ninth installment of the Live in a Dive series. It was released by Fat Wreck Chords on October 18, 2019 and includes songs spanning from the band's debut album Don't Turn Away (1992) to the more recent album Protection (2016).

The album was recorded at Saint Vitus in March 2019.

== Background ==
On May 4, 2018 it was announced by Fat Wreck Chords that the Live in a Dive series would return. Ribbed: Live in a Dive by NOFX, the first album in the series in over 13 years, was released in August the same year.

The release of Live in a Dive by Face to Face was announced in August 2019. A new song of the album was released, "Bent But Not Broken". A tour with Lagwagon was announced in July 2019. The second song of the album, "All for Nothing", was released in September 2019.

== Track listing ==
1. "Resignation" - 4:31
2. "Bent But Not Broken" - 2:26
3. "Bill of Goods" - 3:08
4. "Double Crossed" - 3:12
5. "What’s in a Name" - 2:57
6. "No Authority" - 2:51
7. "I Won’t Say I’m Sorry" - 3:35
8. "You Could’ve Had Everything" - 2:44
9. "Should Anything Go Wrong" - 2:59
10. "All for Nothing" - 3:21
11. "Disappointed" - 2:40
12. "Disconnected" - 4:35
- Track 1 originally recorded for Face to Face (1996)
- Tracks 2, 4, and 7 originally recorded for Protection (2016)
- Track 3 originally recorded for How to Ruin Everything (2002)
- Tracks 5, 8, and 11 originally recorded for Reactionary (2000)
- Tracks 6 and 12 originally recorded for Don't Turn Away (1992)
- Tracks 9 and 10 originally recorded for Laugh Now, Laugh Later (2011)

== Performers ==
- Scott Shiflett - bass, backing vocals
- Danny Thompson - drums, backing vocals
- Dennis Hill - electric guitar, backing vocals
- Trever Keith - vocals, electric guitar

== Charts ==
Chart (2018)	Peak position
US Independent Albums (Billboard)	3
