= Shoot the Moon: The Essential Collection =

Greatest hits album by Face to Face
- Released: November 15, 2005
- Recorded: 1992–2002
- Genre: Skate punk
- Label: Image

Face to Face chronology
How to Ruin Everything (2002)	Shoot the Moon: The Essential Collection (2005)	Laugh Now, Laugh Later (2011)

Professional ratings
Review scores
Source	Rating
AllMusic	4.5/5 stars
PopMatters	6/10 stars
Punknews.org	4.5/5 stars

Shoot the Moon: The Essential Collection is a greatest hits album by the punk band Face to Face. It was released on November 15, 2005, a year after the band had dissolved. It features songs from all of the band's albums except for Ignorance Is Bliss and their cover album Standards & Practices.

== Track listing ==
All tracks are written by Face to Face.

No.	Title	Originally appeared on	Length
1.	"Disconnected"	Don't Turn Away	3:28
2.	"I Want"	Don't Turn Away	3:01
3.	"You've Done Nothing"	Don't Turn Away	2:00
4.	"Pastel"	Don't Turn Away	3:13
5.	"Don't Turn Away"	Over It	2:46
6.	"You Lied"	Big Choice	3:25
7.	"Velocity"	Big Choice	3:16
8.	"A-OK"	Big Choice	2:58
9.	"It's Not Over"	Big Choice	2:25
10.	"Blind"	Face to Face	2:42
11.	"Ordinary"	Face to Face	2:48
12.	"I Won't Lie Down"	Face to Face	3:17
13.	"Complicated"	Face to Face	4:01
14.	"Walk the Walk" (Live)	Face to Face, Live	3:16
15.	"I'm Trying" (Live)	Don't Turn Away, Live	3:04
16.	"Disappointed"	Reactionary	2:48
17.	"What's in a Name?"	Reactionary	3:06
18.	"Bill of Goods"	How to Ruin Everything	2:48
19.	"A Wolf in Sheep's Clothing"	How to Ruin Everything	3:08
20.	"Thick as a Brick"	Previously unreleased	3:36
21.	"Disconnected" (Live)	Don't Turn Away, Over It, Big Choice	3:20
