= Chad Blinman =

American musician

- Born: November 14, 1969 (age 55)
- Origin: Southern California, United States
- Genres: Rock, electronic, punk rock, alternative rock, industrial rock, pop punk, post-punk, gothic rock
- Occupation(s): Recording engineer/mixer, record producer, electronic musician, college professor
- Instrument(s): Electronics, drums, vocals
- Years active: 1991–present
- Website: www.chadblinman.com

Chad Blinman is an American recording engineer and mixer, music producer, and electronic musician. He has worked with such artists as Face to Face, the Get Up Kids, Saves the Day, Jackson United, Faith and the Muse, Monica Richards, Senses Fail, Moneen, the Deep Eynde and Jarboe, and is a member of the remix/mash-up team the Legion of Doom and recording projects Viva Death and Real Space Noise. He is also on the faculty of the Music Production and Engineering department at Berklee College of Music.

== Biography and career ==
Blinman was born and grew up near Los Angeles, California. From an early age, he had a strong interest in music and recording technology, citing the Beatles and many post-punk and new wave bands among his favorites. In high school, he began playing drums in an electronic band and experimenting with recording at home. His professional audio career began at theme park Six Flags Magic Mountain, where he engineered live sound for various bands and theatrical shows in 1986-87.

Blinman began his professional studio career in 1990, working as a runner at Ground Control Studios in Santa Monica and Studio 55 in Hollywood before moving to The Complex Studios in West Los Angeles in 1991. At The Complex he worked as an assistant engineer for several years with such artists as Leonard Cohen, Neil Young, the Yellowjackets, Jack Sheldon, Neil Diamond and Tracy Chapman. He also worked at The Complex and Wilshire Stages as an ADR recordist and production sound mixer for film and television shows including many episodes of the animated programs The Simpsons, Futurama, and King of the Hill.

In the mid-1990s, Blinman moved into freelance record work, mixing albums by This Ascension and Popsicko in 1994 and founding his own production company and personal studio The Eye Socket in 1995, where he recorded and co-produced albums by Faith and the Muse, Malign, and Autumn. In 1998, he mixed the album Live by Face to Face, the first of many collaborations with the band and members Trever Keith and Scott Shiflett, including Viva Death and the Legion of Doom. He co-produced, recorded and mixed the 1999 Face to Face album Ignorance Is Bliss, their 1999 covers album Standards & Practices, their 2000 album Reactionary, and their 2002 album How to Ruin Everything, as well as Trever Keith's 2008 solo album Melancholics Anonymous and all three albums by Viva Death: their eponymous debut in 2002, One Percent Panic in 2006, and Curse the Darkness in 2010.

The Legion of Doom achieved notoriety for their 2005 mash-up album Incorporated, which they leaked intentionally onto peer-to-peer networks after their original plan to license all of the material proved impossible. Estimates of P2P downloads number in the millions, and fan-created videos for the Incorporated mash-ups have millions of views. The Legion of Doom has remixed songs by Flyleaf, Senses Fail, Thrice, Slayer, Skillet, Goblin, and others.

In 2006, Blinman co-founded independent artist collective and label Functional Equivalent Recordings to release records by Real Space Noise, Viva Death, Tate Eskew and others.

As a touring musician, Blinman has performed on drums with Faith and the Muse, Das Ich and Ichor in 1995-96, and on keyboards/electronics with Trever Keith in 2008. Blinman also worked as touring front of house engineer for Face to Face and Tweaker in 2004.

Relocating to Boston in 2010, Blinman joined the Berklee College of Music faculty as Assistant Professor of Music Production and Engineering. Blinman also serves as Faculty Advisor and General Manager of Berklee's radio station, the BIRN (Berklee Internet Radio Network). He hosts a weekly show on the BIRN called Laboratory X. He also continues his freelance work, recording at The Eye Socket and elsewhere.
