= Scott Shiflett =

American rock musician; bassist

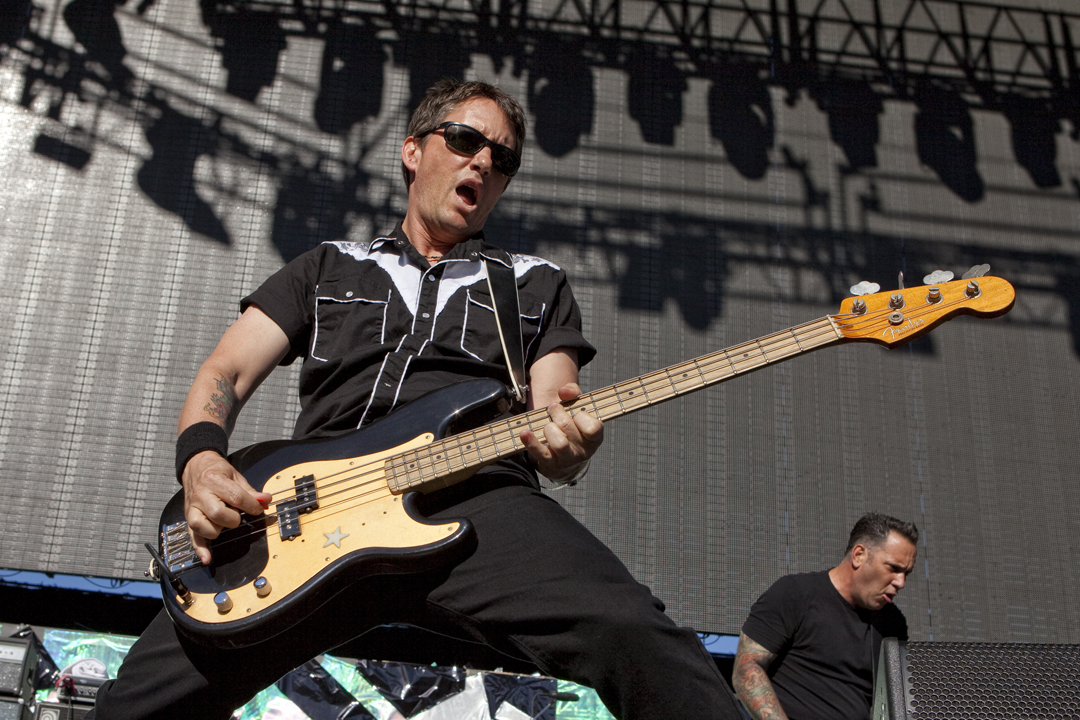
- Shiflett performing in 2011

Background information
- Birth name: Scott David Shiflett
- Also known as: Topper, Yamachan
- Born: August 22, 1966 (age 58)
- Genres: Punk rock
- Occupation(s): Musician, songwriter
- Instrument(s): Bass guitar, guitar, drums
- Labels: Vagrant, Antagonist, Functional Equivalent

Scott David Shiflett (born August 22, 1966) is an American musician who has been the bassist in the punk rock band Face to Face since 1995. Born in Santa Barbara, California, he is the brother of Foo Fighters lead guitarist Chris Shiflett. Scott has also performed in the bands Viva Death, Me First and the Gimme Gimmes, Jackson United, and 22 Jacks.

== Career ==
Scott Shiflett joined Face to Face in 1995 replacing original bassist Matt Riddle. Shiflett became both a co-songwriter and co-producer of the band's records along with bandmate Trever Keith. Shiflett and Keith also formed Viva Death, a side project of Face to Face, as a vehicle for their baritone guitar driven experimental rock. Viva Death features contributions from Shiflett's brother Chris, drummer Josh Freese, and longtime Face to Face producer/mixer Chad Blinman. Shiflett plays all the instruments on Viva Death's later recordings. Shiflett also performs with his brother Chris in Jackson United, and has filled in for Chris as lead guitarist in Me First and the Gimme Gimmes on several tours since 2004. In 2023 he joined Eagles of Death Metal.

== Discography ==
with 22 Jacks

- Uncle Bob (1996)

with Face to Face

- Face to Face (1996)
- Econo Live (1996)
- Live (1998)
- Standards & Practices (1999)
- Ignorance Is Bliss (1999)
- Reactionary (2000)
- How to Ruin Everything (2002)
- Shoot the Moon: Essential Collection (2005)
- Laugh Now, Laugh Later (2011)
- Three Chords and a Half Truth (2013)
- Protection (2016)

with Viva Death

- Viva Death (2002)
- One Percent Panic (2006)
- Curse The Darkness (2010)
- Illuminate (2018)

with Jackson United

- Jackson (EP) (2003)
- Western Ballads (2004)
- Harmony and Dissidence (2008)
