= Western Ballads =

Studio album by Jackson United
- Released: October 11, 2004
- Genre: Punk rock
- Producer: Chad Blinman

Jackson United chronology
Western Ballads (2004)	Harmony and Dissidence (2008)

Western Ballads is the first full-length album by Jackson United, released in 2004.

== Track listing ==
1. "Lions Roar"
2. "All The Way"
3. "A Better Life"
4. "Down To You"
5. "She’s Giving In"
6. "Unchanged"
7. "Fell Into"
8. "Loose Ends"
9. "OK Alright"
10. "Here Come Hollow"
11. "Pure"
12. "Long Shadow"
13. "Sharp Edges"
14. "That Curse"
15. "Don't Point Your Guns At Me" (Bonus Track)
16. "Back To Me" (Bonus Track)
17. "Let Us In Dear" (Bonus Track)

== Personnel ==
Personnel taken from Western Ballads CD booklet.

Jackson United

- Chris Shiflett – guitar, vocals, keyboards
- Scott Shiflett – bass
- Pete Parada – drums

Production

- Chad Blinman – production, recording, mixing
- Brian Hearity – assistant engineer (Sunset Sound)
- Mark Lee – assistant engineer (Westbeach Recorders)
- Matt Marin – mix assistant
- Andy Brohard – mix assistant
- Joe Gastwirt – mastering
