= Danny Thompson (drummer) =

American drummer (born 1967)

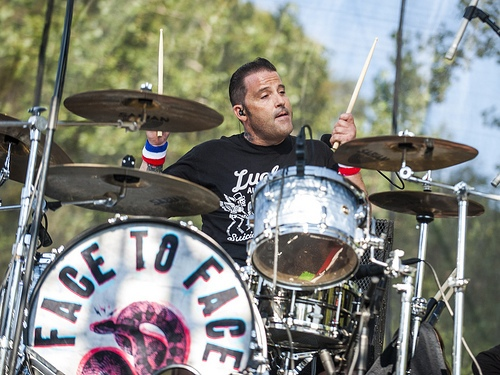
- Thompson performing with Face to Face in Irvine, California. June 2011

Background information
- Born: Danny Thompson; May 23, 1967 (age 59)
- Genre: Punk rock
- Occupation: Musician
- Instrument: Drums
- Labels: Rise Records; Antagonist Records

Danny Thompson (born May 23, 1967) is an American musician from Naperville, Illinois. He has been the drummer for the punk rock band Face to Face since 2008.

== Background ==
Thompson joined Face to Face in 2008 when the band reunited. Drummer Pete Parada had become a member of The Offspring in 2007. Before performing with Face to Face, Thompson drummed for Material Issue, The Uprising, and Why We Kill. He was a featured artist on Alan Parsons' album, "From The New World” which was released on July 15, 2022.

In addition to playing in Face to Face, Thompson is the co-owner of Music Factory School of Music in Costa Mesa, California and runs a line of men's grooming products called Old Ironsides Gentlemen's Care. He uses LTD Classic Maple drums and Sabian cymbals.

== Discography ==
with Face to Face

- Laugh Now, Laugh Later (2011)
- Three Chords and a Half Truth (2013)
- Protection (2016)
