= Before You Were Punk 2 =

Compilation album by Vagrant Records
- Released: 17 August 1999
- Genre: Punk rock
- Label: Vagrant Records

Vagrant Records chronology
Before You Were Punk (1997)	Before You Were Punk 2 (1999)

Professional ratings
Review scores
Source	Rating
Allmusic	link

Before You Were Punk 2 is a compilation album released in 1999 by Vagrant Records. It is a sequel to 1997's Before You Were Punk and consists of a number of late-1990s punk rock and independent bands covering songs that were popularised during the 1980s "new wave" musical movement.

In contrast to Before You Were Punk, which was released at a time when Vagrant Records did not have a large roster of artists and therefore relied on contributions from bands on other record labels, Before You Were Punk 2 features several bands that had recently signed to Vagrant. These include No Motiv, The Hippos, The Get Up Kids, and the Gotohells. Rocket from the Crypt would also sign to the label the following year.

== Reception ==
Rocket-Fuel's Rob Bernsten panned most of the covers, deeming them "amazingly un-punk" and "just like the shiny-happy, apolitical originals with different vocals yet not as well played." He praised Rocket From the Crypt's take on Wall of Voodoo's "This Way Out", noting its "Slant 6-esque vampire guitars". Bernsten wrote that "[i]t's no surprise [Rocket] have the best song since they're by far the best band included, but it's ironic the band with the fewest attachments to brattiness or punk rock politics (besides giving those with RFTC tattoos a free lifetime pass to their shows) are the most musically and vocally aggressive and threatening."

== Track listing ==
Original performers shown in parentheses
No.	Title	Writer(s)	Artist	Length
1.	"What I Like About You" (The Romantics)	Wally Palmar, Mike Skill, Rich Cole, Jimmy Marinos	The Suicide Machines
2.	"Electricity" (OMD)	Paul Humphreys, Andy McCluskey	NOFX
3.	"Space Age Love Song" (A Flock of Seagulls)	A Flock of Seagulls	No Motiv
4.	"No Action" (Elvis Costello)	Elvis Costello	MxPx
5.	"Our Lips Are Sealed" (The Go-Go's)	Jane Wiedlin, Terry Hall	The Hippos
6.	"Don't You (Forget About Me)" (Simple Minds)	Keith Forsey, Steve Schiff	The Bouncing Souls
7.	"Close to Me" (The Cure)	Robert Smith	The Get Up Kids
8.	"This Way Out" (Wall of Voodoo)	Wall of Voodoo	Rocket from the Crypt
9.	"Just What I Needed" (The Cars)	Ric Ocasek	Gotohells
10.	"Bring On the Dancing Horses" (Echo & the Bunnymen)	Will Sergeant, Ian McCulloch, Les Pattinson, Pete de Freitas	Lagwagon
11.	"Every Breath You Take" (The Police)	Sting	Strung Out
12.	"Rebel Yell" (Billy Idol)	Billy Idol, Steve Stevens	ALL

== Album information ==
- Record label: Vagrant Records
- Art direction by Kristin Vanderlip
- Recording details:
  - Track 1 recorded and mixed by Tim Pak at Woodshed Studios
  - Track 2 produced and mixed by Ryan Greene at Motor Studios
  - Track 3 recorded and mixed by Chad Blinman at Audio International Studios and The Complex Studios
  - Track 4 recorded and mixed by Ryan Hadlock at Bear Creek Studios. Produced by MxPx and Ryan Hadlock
  - Track 5 recorded and mixed by Chris Fudurich at Mat Hadder Studios and Chateau Chaumont Studios. Produced by Chris Fudurich, Ariel Rechtshaid, and Rich Zahniser.
  - Track 6 recorded and mixed by The Bouncing Souls and Michael Ward at Big Blue Meanie Studios
  - Track 7 recorded by Alex Brahl and mixed by Chad Blinman at Mad Hatter Studios
  - Track 8 recorded and mixed by John Reis at Drag Racist Recorders in San Diego, California. Produced by Long Gone John.
  - Track 9 recorded and mixed by Michael Douglas and George Harris at Panda Productions
  - Track 10 recorded and mixed by Ryan Greene and Angus Cooke at Orange Whip Studios. Produced by Joey Cape.
  - Track 11 recorded and mixed by Strung Out at Hollywood Sound Studios
  - Track 12 recorded and mixed by Bill Stevenson and Jason Livermore at The Blasting Room in Fort Collins, Colorado.
- Harmonica on track 1 performed by James Wailin
- Additional vocals on track 5 performed by Rachel Haden
- Horns on track 6 performed by The Pietasters horn section
