= Kaylin =

Kaylin, Kaylyn, etc, are feminine given names, and Kaylin is also found as a surname. Notable people with these names include:

== Kaylin ==
=== Given name ===
- Kaylin Andres (1985–2016), American writer
- Kaylin Gillis (2003–2023), American murder victim
- Kaylin Hsieh (born 2001), Hong Kong fencer
- Kaylin Irvine (born 1990), Canadian speed skater
- Kaylin Richardson (born 1984), American alpine ski racer
- Kaylin Skinner (born 1998), Canadian curler
- Kaylin Swart (born 1994), South African soccer player
- Kaylin Whitney (born 1988), American track and field athlete

=== Surname ===
- Samuel Kaylin (1892–1983), American film composer

== Other spellings ==
- Kaylyn Brown (born 2004), American Olympic sprinter
- Kaylyn Kyle (born 1988), Canadian sports broadcaster and former soccer player
- Kaylynn Fry, Australian Olympic rowing coxswain of the 1980s and 1990s
- Kaylynne Truong (born 2001), Vietnamese-American basketball player

== See also ==
- Kalyn
