= When All Is Said and Done (disambiguation) =

"When All Is Said and Done" is a song by ABBA.

When All Is Said and Done may also refer to:

- "When All Is Said and Done", a song by Boyzone from Said and Done
- "When All Is Said and Done", a song by Napalm Death from Smear Campaign
- "When All Is Said and Done", a song by Tyrone Wells
- "When All Is Said and Done", a song by Trapt from Trapt
- When All Is Said and Done, an album by From Satellite
