= Harmony and Dissidence =

Album by Jackson United

Studio album by Jackson United
- Released: April 8, 2008 (Digital); April 11, 2008 AUS CD; September 2, 2008 US CD; November 3, 2008 UK CD
- Recorded: 2007–2008 at Studio 606 in Northridge, CA
- Genre: Punk rock
- Length: 40:28
- Label: Magnificent, Deck Cheese, Acetate
- Producer: Jackson United

Jackson United chronology
Western Ballads (2004)	Harmony and Dissidence (2008)

Singles from Jackson United
- 1. "21st Century Fight Song (Digital)" Released: 2008

Harmony and Dissidence is the second full-length album by Jackson United. It was released in 2008 through Magnificent Records, Acetate Records and Deck Cheese Records.

== History ==
The album was recorded during 2007 at Foo Fighters' personal Studio, 606 West in Northridge, CA, United States. All songs were written by Chris Shiflett, guitarist for Foo Fighters. It features bandmates Dave Grohl and Taylor Hawkins sharing drumming duties, as Jackson United did not have a regular drummer at the time of recording. Also featured on the album are Foo Fighters touring members Rami Jaffee and Drew Hester on keyboards and percussion respectively. Chad Blinman mixed the album at his personal studio, The Eye Socket.

The album was first released as a download album via iTunes on April 8, 2008, and CD versions followed later in Australia, Japan, United Kingdom (November 3) and United States (September 2).

== Track listing ==
All songs written by Chris Shiflett

1. "21st Century Fight Song"
2. "Undertow"
3. "Black Regrets"
4. "Lifeboat"
5. "Trigger Happy"
6. "White Flag Burning"
7. "Stitching"
8. "The Land Without Law"
9. "The Day That No One Smiled"
10. "Damn You"
11. "Like A Bomb"
12. "You Can't Have It"

=== Bonus Tracks ===
International versions of the album came with the following bonus tracks:

1. "Help Save The Youth Of America"
2. "Poison In The Blood" (UK Release only)
3. "Loose Ends" (US Release only)

On the UK edition of the CD, "Poison In The Blood" and "Help Save The Youth of America" are erroneously reversed on the disc compared to the track listing on the CD.

== Personnel ==
Jackson United

- Chris Shiflett – vocals, lead guitar
- Scott Shiflett – bass
- Doug Sangalang – rhythm guitar

Additional musicians

- Dave Grohl – drums on tracks 2,3,4,5,6,7,11
- Taylor Hawkins – drums on tracks 1,8,9,10,12
- Rami Jaffee – keyboards
- Drew Hester – percussion

=== Other ===
- Producers: Jackson United
- Engineers: Mike Terry, John Lousteau
- Mixing: Chad Blinman
- Mastering: Joe Gastwirt
- Art direction and Design: Jeff Nicholas
- Photography: Ricky Drasin, Gillian Jackman
