= Pete Parada =

American drummer (born 1973)

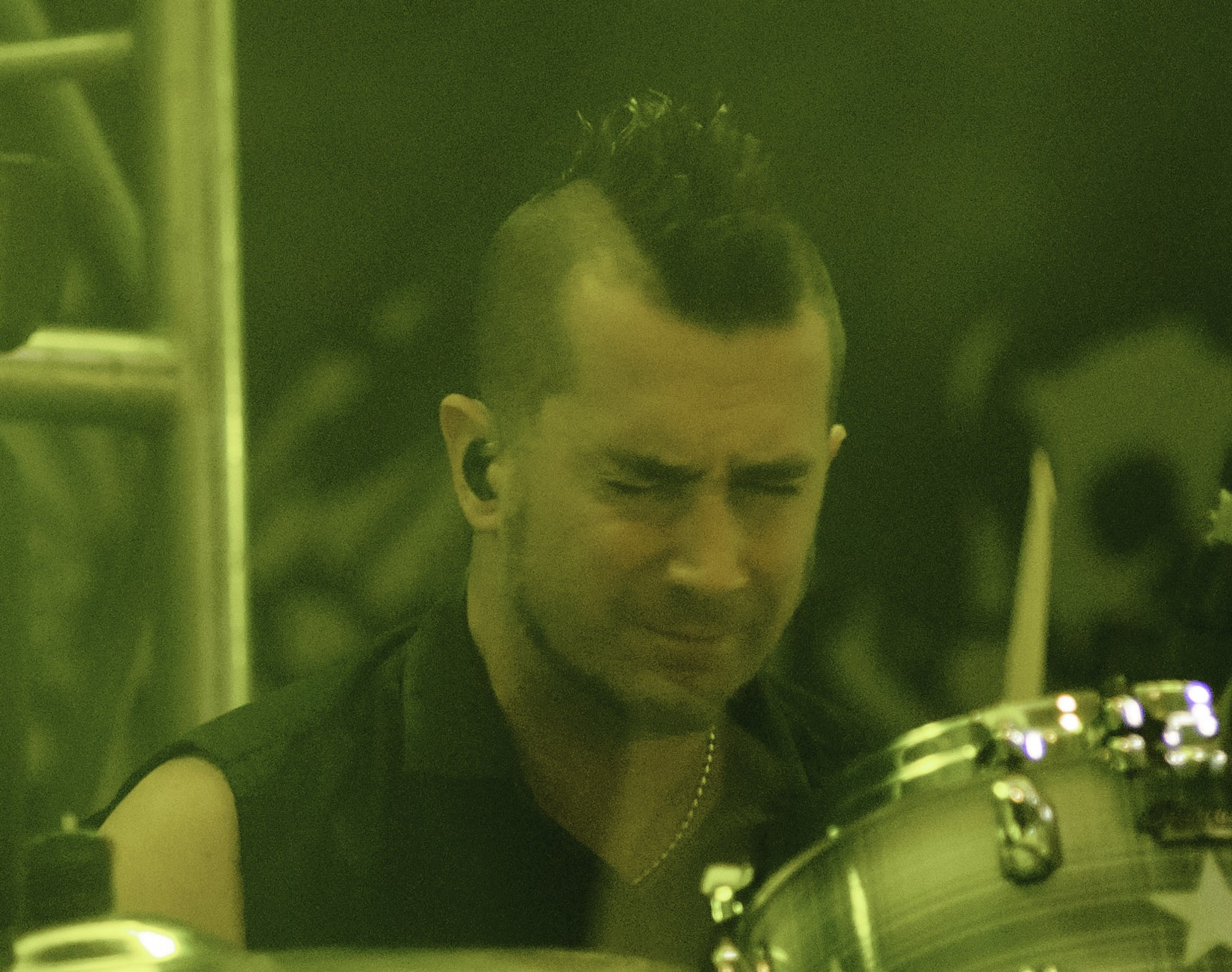
- Pete Parada in 2016

Background information
- Born: Peter Parada; July 9, 1974 (age 52); Arkport, New York, U.S.
- Genres: Punk rock; pop-punk; alternative rock; heavy metal
- Occupation: Musician
- Instrument: Drums
- Years active: 1995–present
- Member of: The Defiant
- Formerly of: The Offspring; Face to Face; Saves the Day; Steel Prophet; Jackson United; Halford; Engine; Hot Mess
- Website: peteparada.com

Peter Parada (born July 9, 1974) is an American musician who has been a member of several bands. Parada's drumming career began in 1995 when he joined L.A. band World In Pain on a recommendation from future Korn drummer Ray Luzier and then Steel Prophet in 1996 with whom he recorded one album a year later. Subsequently he joined Face to Face, Saves the Day and the Offspring, where he was a member from 2007 to 2021 and served as the band's second longest-serving drummer, behind Ron Welty. Parada was also associated with the metal band Engine and Rob Halford's solo project Halford, and briefly played drums in the punk band Alkaline Trio. He has also toured with My Chemical Romance, Devo and The Bronx. Parada joined YouTuber Tim Pool's band Timcast for their songs "Only Ever Wanted" and "Genocide" and in 2023 co-founded the band the Defiant.

== Career ==
=== Face to Face ===
After auditioning 25 different drummers to replace Rob Kurth, Parada officially joined Face to Face in 1998. He was present on four albums with the band: Ignorance Is Bliss, Standards & Practices (both released in 1999), Reactionary (2000) and How to Ruin Everything (2002).

=== Saves the Day ===
Prior to Face to Face's break up, Parada joined Saves the Day in 2002 to replace former drummer Bryan Newman. He recorded two of the band's albums, In Reverie and Sound the Alarm. He also recorded "Bug sessions volume one", the first in a series of releases containing acoustic versions of their songs. On March 28, 2007, Parada left the band.

=== The Offspring ===
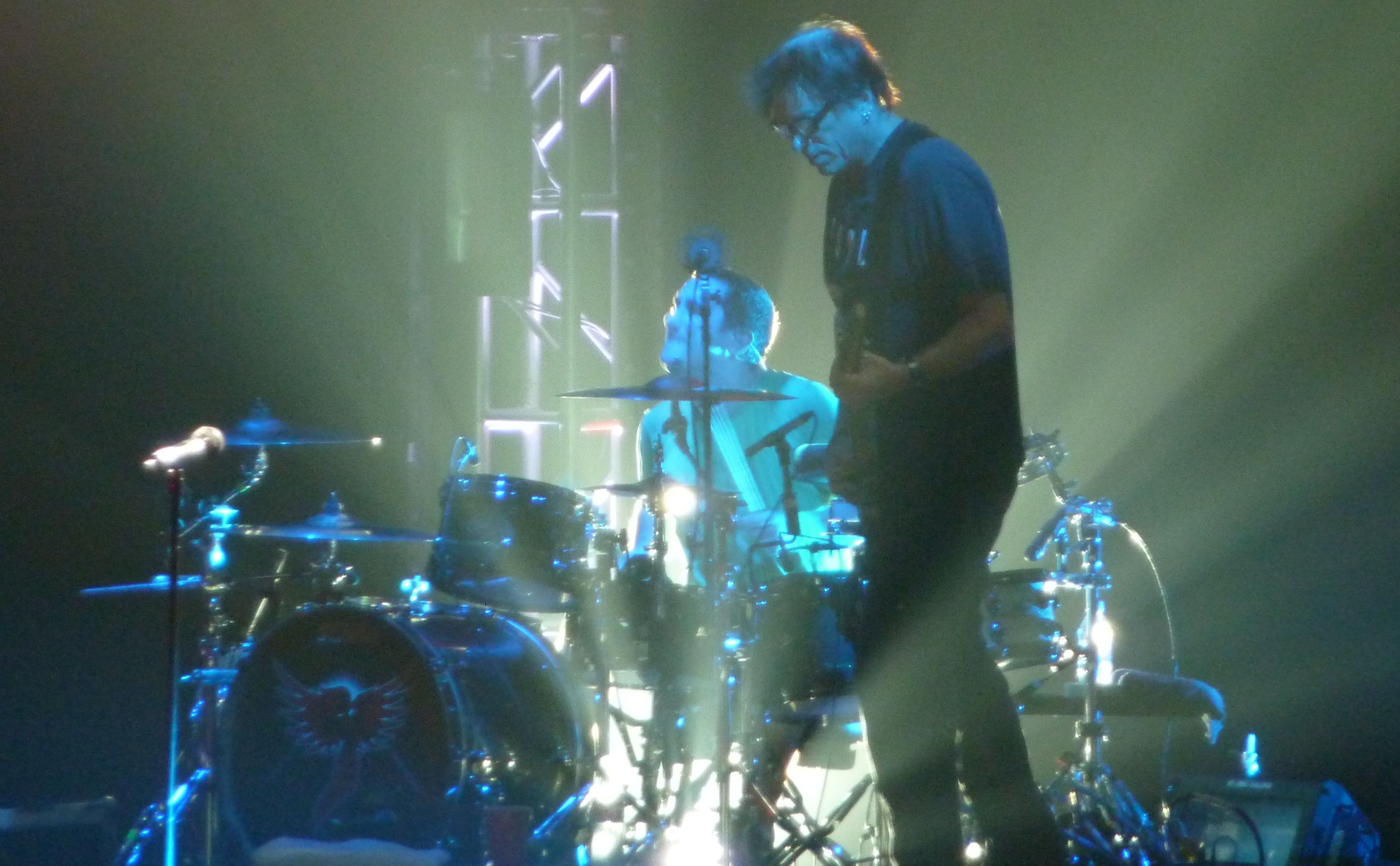
Pete Parada along with Noodles, performing with the Offspring in 2009.

On July 27, 2007, the Offspring introduced Parada as the band's new drummer, replacing Atom Willard, who had departed to focus on Angels & Airwaves. Josh Freese filled in as drummer in the studio for then-upcoming Offspring album, Rise and Fall, Rage and Grace, as Parada had not been chosen yet as Willard's replacement. Parada did not record due to contract issues but did tour with the Offspring in support of that album.

In June 2009, The Offspring guitarist Noodles told Billboard.com that the Offspring were planning to release a ninth album in 2010, and noted that Parada would be involved in the recording process. Titled Days Go By, the album was eventually released on June 26, 2012. He became the first official Offspring drummer to play on an Offspring album since Ron Welty in 2000 (Conspiracy of One). Parada only played on four tracks on that album ("Turning into You","Dirty Magic", "Dividing by Zero" and "Slim Pickens Does the Right Thing and Rides the Bomb to Hell"), while Josh Freese played on the rest. According to Holland, Freese played on the majority of tracks due to him living in California other than Parada who was also busy with some additional projects during the recording of Days Go By. Parada appeared on ten out of twelve tracks on the band's next album Let the Bad Times Roll (2021).

On August 2, 2021, Parada revealed on Twitter that he was being fired from the Offspring. He stated the reason for his firing was for declining to take a COVID-19 vaccine on the advice of his doctor, due to suffering from Guillain–Barré syndrome. In November 2021, vocalist Dexter Holland and guitarist Noodles detailed in an interview the "roadblocks" they kept running into when they looked into what it would take to tour with an unvaccinated member of the band, and they said the decision was taken "for the time being". Nevertheless, in his tweet of August 2021, Parada said he was deemed "unsafe to be around" not only on tour, but also in the recording studio. Parada was replaced on tour by Josh Freese and was officially replaced in 2023 by Brandon Pertzborn.

=== The Defiant ===
In March 2023, Parada co-founded the band The Defiant which is fronted by former Mighty Mighty Bosstones singer Dicky Barrett and features Greg Camp of Smash Mouth, Johnny Rioux of Street Dogs and Joey LaRocca of The Briggs. The group originally planned to release their debut album in mid 2023. They later announced an October 27, 2023 release to streaming services Deezer, Spotify, Amazon Music, Apple Music, and YouTube Music.

== Selected discography ==
Year	Artist/band	Album	Song(s)
1995	World In Pain	Various - The Fall And The Rise: Los Angeles	"Cut"
1997	Steel Prophet	Into the Void (Hallucinogenic Conception)	Entire album
1999	Engine	Engine	Entire album
1999	Face to Face	So Why Aren't You Happy? EP	Entire album
1999	Face to Face	Standards & Practices	Entire album
1999	Face to Face	Ignorance Is Bliss	Entire album
2000	Face to Face	Reactionary	Entire album
2000	Halford	Resurrection	"The One You Love to Hate"
2002	Engine	Superholic	Entire album
2002	Face to Face/Dropkick Murphys	Face to Face vs. Dropkick Murphys	Face to Face songs
2002	Face to Face	How to Ruin Everything	Entire album
2003	Saves the Day	In Reverie	Entire album
2003	Jackson	Jackson	Entire EP
2004	Jackson United	Western Ballads	Entire album
2005	Face to Face	Shoot the Moon: The Essential Collection	Songs from Reactionary and How to Ruin Everything
2006	Saves the Day	Sound the Alarm	Entire album
2006	Saves the Day	Bug Sessions Volume One	Entire album
2011	Hot Mess	Learn to Sleep With the Light On	Entire album
2011	Oceanography	EP1	Entire EP
2012	The Offspring	Days Go By	"Turning Into You", "Dirty Magic", "Dividing By Zero" and "Slim Pickens Does the Right Thing and Rides the Bomb to Hell"
2014	The Offspring	Summer Nationals	Entire EP
2015	The Offspring	Coming For You	Single
2021	The Offspring	Let the Bad Times Roll	Entire album except "Let The Bad Times Roll", "We Never Have Sex Anymore", "Gone Away" and "Lullaby"
2022	Timcast	Non-album singles	"Only Ever Wanted," "Genocide (Losing My Mind)"
2023	The Defiant	If We're Really Being Honest	Entire album
2024	Akira the Don	Meditations Vol. II	"Better than Justice"
