= Automatic 7 =

American rock trio, formed in 1993

- Origin: Los Angeles, California, US
- Genres: Punk rock
- Years active: 1993–present
- Labels: Mental, Vagrant, A&M, BYO Records
- Members: John Hulett; Nic Nifoussi; Ray Mehlbaum
- Website: http://www.myspace.com/automatic7songs

Automatic 7 is an American rock trio. Formed in 1993, they have released three albums to date. They released their debut album self-titled Automatic 7 on November 22, 1995, on BYO Records. Band members John Hulett (vocals and guitar), Nic Nifoussi (bass guitar and vocals) and Ray Mehlbaum (drums) toured North America and Europe with Social Distortion, Bad Religion, Face to Face, Bouncing Souls, Less than Jake, D.O.A., Youth Brigade, Shades Apart, Down By Law, Suicide Machines in addition to various shows with Love and Rockets, Lit, Jimmy Eat World, Reverend Horton Heat and John Doe of X. In 1996 Automatic 7 contributed a cover version of the Psychedelic Furs "Pretty in Pink" to the Vagrant Records V/A release Before You Were Punk along with other various 1980s themed covers by bands such as Blink 182 and Face to Face.

In 1997 Automatic 7 signed with A&M Records; the band recorded their second album at Long View Farm with producer Ron Saint Germain. However, as A&M prepared for the release of the second album, PolyGram (A&M Parent label) was bought by Seagram and merged with its MCA Records family to create Universal Music. A&M was subsequently merged into Universal Music Group's then newly formed Interscope-Geffen-A&M label group. All these changes left the band disenchanted with A&M and Automatic 7 split with the label, and the album was never released. However, Automatic 7 signed with Vagrant Records, which was owned and operated by the band's manager Rich Egan and released Beggar's Life on July 25, 2000.

Between 2001 and 2006, Automatic 7 went on a hiatus. The band reformed in 2006, and released the album At Funeral Speed in 2007, on the independent label Mental Records. The album was well received and included a rendition of Bruce Springsteen's "Atlantic City". In 2008 Nifoussi and Ray Mehlbaum formed the Noise/Rock duo Killing Bees and subsequently released their self-titled debut on Guano loco/Loose Fang records.

== Releases ==
=== Automatic 7 ===
All songs written by John Hulett and Phil Jaurigui, except for where noted.

No.	Title	Length
1.	"Bury Me"	1:53
2.	"Lucky One"	3:01
3.	"Crucified"	2:12
4.	"T.V."	2:43
5.	"Wreck" (Hulett)	3:11
6.	"Getting Older" (Hulett)	2:40
7.	"Closer to the Stars" (Dave Pirner)	2:09
8.	"Stuck" (Hulett)	3:39
9.	"Hold On" (Hulett)	2:15
10.	"Picture That"	2:43

=== Beggar's Life ===
All songs written by John Hulett, Nic Nifoussi and Ray Mehlbaum

Beggar's Life

Studio album by Automatic 7
- Released: July 25, 2000
- Genre: Rock
- Label: Vagrant

Professional ratings
Review scores
Source	Rating
Allmusic	3.5/5 stars

No.	Title	Length
1.	"Broken Record"	2:51
2.	"Last Train to Hitsville"	2:19
3.	"Had It All"	2:42
4.	"'98"	2:38
5.	"Bow Down"	2:35
6.	"Beggar's Life"	3:42
7.	"Syringe"	2:48
8.	"Waiting for My Ride"	3:09
9.	"All They Can Steal"	2:36
10.	"We're Through"	3:05

=== At Funeral Speed ===
All songs written by John Hulett, Nic Nifoussi and Ray Mehlbaum except "Atlantic City" written by Bruce Springsteen.

No.	Title	Length
1.	"40 Blocks"	2:36
2.	"All the Happiness You Can Buy"	2:55
3.	"Start Over"	3:08
4.	"As I Am"	2:56
5.	"Atlantic City"	3:30
6.	"Sunday Eyes"	3:19
7.	"Ghost-Like"	3:09
8.	"Greasy (Revisited)"	3:30
9.	"Fall in Line"	2:56
10.	"The Better Part of Me"	2:49
11.	"Not Enough"	2:46
12.	"Bad Tattoo"	6:47

== Musical style ==
Automatic 7's style has been compared to Social Distortion, Jawbreaker and Face to Face. John Hulett cites Jawbreaker as Automatic 7's greatest influence, and says that the band are Jawbreaker fans.

Automatic 7 has one guitarist, but over the years considered adding another guitarist to the band. In 1997 Face To Face guitarist/songwriter Trever Keith joined Automatic 7 briefly (guitarist/backing vocals) and toured with the band as it did support work for Social Distortions 1997 White Light, White Heat, White Trash tour. The band also played with guitarist Marco Moir, who toured with them in support of Bad Religion and also did various recordings with the band, but Automatic 7 ultimately decided to remain a trio with only Hulett on guitar.
