= Viva Death (album) =

Studio album by Viva Death
- Released: September 2002
- Genre: Rock
- Label: Vagrant Records
- Producer: Scott Shiflett, Trever Keith, Chad Blinman

Viva Death chronology
Viva Death (2002)	One Percent Panic (2006)

Viva Death is the first full-length album by the California rock band Viva Death. The album was released in 2002 on Vagrant Records.

== Track listing ==
All music and lyrics written by Viva Death, except where noted.

1. "Fundamentalist"
2. "The Start Up"
3. "Professionals"
4. "Desire Us a Flood"
5. "Blood and Oranges"
6. "Terrorism for Fun and Profit"
7. "The Rigor Mortis Shake" (Evil Wilhelm)
8. "Murder By Proxy" (Chris Taylor and Viva Death)
9. "Trust Me"
10. "Intermission"
11. "Figure It Out"
12. "Manipulate - Capitulate"
13. "Safety Is Our Primary Concern"
14. "Crosses"
15. "Misled"

== Credits ==
- Scott Shiflett – Baritone guitar, vocals
- Trever Keith – Baritone guitar, vocals
- Chris Shiflett – Baritone guitar
- Josh Freese – Drums
- Chad Blinman – Noises and Effects

=== Additional musicians ===
- Evil Wilhelm – vocals on "The Rigor Mortis Shake"
- Monica Richards – additional vocals on "Desire Us a Flood"
