= Incorporated (Legion of Doom album) =

Remix album by The Legion of Doom
- Released: March 6, 2007
- Recorded: 2006
- Genre: Mashup, post-hardcore, metalcore, alternative rock
- Length: 52:54
- Label: Illegal Art

The Legion of Doom chronology
Incorporated (2007)	The Legion of Doom VS Triune (2009)

Professional ratings
Review scores
Source	Rating
Jive Magazine	4/5 stars

Incorporated is a mash-up album made by the mash-up band the Legion of Doom.

== History ==
The album was recorded in 2005. Initially, the band released the songs "I Know What You Buried Last Summer", "Dottie in a Car Crash" and "The Quiet Screaming" on their website for free download. After several delays due to several bands not wanting their music released in mashup form, the group leaked the album online through several P2P networks. On February 6, 2007, it was announced that the album would be released in physical format through Illegal Art. The CD was released on March 6 of that year.

== Track listing ==
Track	Title	Length	Song #1	Song #2
1	"I Know What You Buried Last Summer"	3:07	"Buried a Lie" by Senses Fail	"You're So Last Summer" by Taking Back Sunday
2	"Dottie in a Car Crash"	3:09	"I'm a Loner Dottie, a Rebel" by the Get Up Kids	"Understanding in a Car Crash" by Thursday
3	"The Quiet Screaming"	3:33	"The Quiet Things That No One Ever Knows" by Brand New	"Screaming Infidelities" by Dashboard Confessional
4	"Lolita's Medicine"	4:09	"Lilacs & Lolita" by From Autumn to Ashes	"New Medicines" by Dead Poetic
5	"Stupid Kill"	3:39	"Stupid Kid" by Alkaline Trio	"Kill Me Quickly" by Thrice
6	"Destroy All Vampires" (feat. Triune)	4:25	"The Shooting Star That Destroyed Us" by A Static Lullaby	"Vampires Will Never Hurt You" by My Chemical Romance
7	"At Your Funeral for a Friend"	3:37	"At Your Funeral" by Saves the Day	"This Years Most Open Heartbreak" by Funeral for a Friend
8	"Dangerous Business Since 1979"	4:01	"It's Dangerous Business Walking out Your Front Door" by Underoath	"January 1979" by mewithoutYou
9	"Icarus Underwater" (feat. Planet Asia)	4:22	"Icarus" by Hopesfall	"Car Underwater" by Armor for Sleep
10	"Ebola in Memphis" (feat. KRS-One)	3:47	"Ebolarama" by Every Time I Die	"Memphis Will Be Laid to Waste" by Norma Jean
11	"Devil in a Blue Dress"	3:39	"Devil in Jersey City" by Coheed and Cambria	"Lady in a Blue Dress" by Senses Fail
12	"A Threnody for a Grand"	3:24	"A Threnody for Modern Romance" by It Dies Today	"Ain't Love Grand" by Atreyu
13	"My Holiday Burns"	4:10	"My Eyes Burn" by Matchbook Romance	"Holiday" by the Get Up Kids
14	"Hands Down Gandhi"	3:58	"Hands Down" by Dashboard Confessional	"Slow Down Gandhi" by Sage Francis

== Personnel ==
- Chad Blinman
- Trever Keith
- Kieron Hilton
