= Mehlbaum =

Mehlbaum may refer to:

- Mehlbaum, Switzerland, a settlement in the municipality of Naters in the Swiss canton of Valais
- Ray Mehlbaum, an American rock drummer
