= Fall to Pieces =

Fall to Pieces may refer to:

- Fall to Pieces (album), a 2020 album by Tricky
- "Fall to Pieces" (Velvet Revolver song), 2004
- "Fall to Pieces" (Avril Lavigne song), 2005
- "Fall to Pieces", a song by Krystal Meyers from Krystal Meyers
- "Fall to Pieces", a song by From Satellite from When All Is Said and Done

== See also ==
- "I Fall to Pieces", a 1961 song by Patsy Cline
- "I Fall to Pieces" (Angel episode), an episode of the American series Angel
- Falling to Pieces (disambiguation)
