= Curse the Darkness =

Studio album by Viva Death
- Released: May 11, 2010
- Genre: Rock
- Label: Functional Equivalent Recordings
- Producer: Scott Shiflett, Chad Blinman

Viva Death chronology
One Percent Panic (2006)	Curse the Darkness (2010)	Illuminate (2018)

Curse the Darkness is the third full-length album by California rock band Viva Death. The album was released in 2010 on Functional Equivalent Recordings.

== Track listing ==
1. "The Life You Save (May Be Your Own)"
2. "Impact"
3. "Bullets Under Mind Control"
4. "Love Lust Trust"
5. "Everything's Tic-toc"
6. "Villain"
7. "Freeze"
8. "Talking Backwards"
9. "Out of Reach"
10. "In Search of Space Boy"
11. "It's Like This"
12. "Wisdom"
13. "Crutch"

== Credits ==
- Scott Shiflett – Baritone guitar, guitar, bass, drums, keyboards, and vocals.

=== Additional musicians ===
- Charlie Ellis (Guitar & vocals, The Life You Save)
- Satnam Singh Ramgotra (Tabla, Love Lust Trust)
- Monica Richards (Vocals, Talking Backwards)
