= Disconnected (Face to Face song) =

- Cover of the 1993 7" vinyl single.

Single by Face to Face

from the album Don't Turn Away and Big Choice
- A-side: "Disconnected"
- B-side: "AOK"; "I Used to Think"
- Released: August 26, 1993
- Recorded: August 1992
- Genre: Skate punk; pop-punk
- Length: 3:28
- Label: Fat Wreck Chords
- Songwriters: Trever Keith, Matt Riddle
- Producer: Jim Goodwin

Face to Face singles chronology
"Disconnected" (1993)	"Debt" (1995)

"Disconnected" is a song by the American punk rock band Face to Face, written by singer/guitarist Trever Keith and bassist Matt Riddle. It first appeared on their 1992 debut album Don't Turn Away and was released as a 7" single in 1993 on the independent record label Fat Wreck Chords. A remixed version appeared on the Over It EP in 1994 after the band had signed to Victory Music. This version received radio airplay, leading the label to request that the band re-record "Disconnected" for their second album Big Choice (1995). This third version of the song was made into a music video and reached #39 on Billboard's Modern Rock Tracks chart in 1995.

== Origins and recording ==
Face to Face had recorded their debut album Don't Turn Away at Westbeach Recorders in Hollywood, California in October 1991 with producer Donnell Cameron. However, there were complications with the record label Dr. Strange Records and nearly a year had passed and the album had still not been released. The band met aspiring record engineer Jim Goodwin, who offered to record new material with them for free. They agreed and recorded five new songs including "Disconnected" with Goodwin at Soundcastle in Los Angeles in August 1992. Goodwin also remixed all of the material from the Westbeach sessions, and the new songs were added to Don't Turn Away which was released on Dr. Strange in 1992.

== Release, reception, and re-recording ==
Copies of Don't Turn Away sold quickly and Dr. Strange was unable to keep up with the demand, so singer/guitarist Trever Keith contacted Fat Mike of Fat Wreck Chords to re-release it with wider distribution. In addition to re-releasing the album, Fat Wreck Chords released "Disconnected" as a 7" single in August 1993. In 1994 Face to Face signed to Victory Music, who released the Over It EP in order to test their new distribution system. The EP included a remixed version of "Disconnected" which was added to the playlist at KROQ-FM. The steady airplay of "Disconnected" helped the band's profile grow considerably, and Victory Music requested that the band re-record the song for their second album Big Choice, which was scheduled to be released in several weeks. Keith has noted that the band were reluctant to re-record the song, but did not want to miss the opportunity to capitalize on its success:

We made [Big Choice] (in 10 days) and before it was even released, our label had started getting radio airplay for "Disconnected." It was on an EP we called Over It that Victory Music had put out to "test" the waters. Since the song was really working at radio, our manager and label wanted us to also put it on our new album. We reluctantly agreed because we didn't want to blow any opportunities or ruin momentum for the band. It was a weird time. A friend of ours at the label called me one day and politely let me know that we were making a lot of mistakes with our career. We decided to fire our manager and try to get off of Victory Music.

"Disconnected"
Sample of "Disconnected" from Face to Face's 1995 album Big Choice. This recording of the song was made into a music video and reached #39 on Billboard's Modern Rock Tracks chart in 1995.

"Disconnected" was included as a bonus track on Big Choice, along with a cover of the Descendents song "Bikeage". After the album's eleventh track, "Late", there is a twelfth untitled track consisting of a conversation between the band members and representatives from the record label about whether or not to include "Disconnected" on the album, with the band members stating that they do not want to be labeled as "sellouts" or lose credibility with their fans, and one member stating that "there's no way in hell this song's going on this record." "Disconnected" then appears as the thirteenth track. This third version of the song included second guitarist Chad Yaro, who had joined the band prior to the recording of Over It. A music video was filmed and the song reached #39 on Billboard's Modern Rock Tracks chart in 1995. It was also used in the soundtracks for the films Tank Girl and National Lampoon's Senior Trip that same year. The song's success ultimately helped Big Choice to sell over 100,000 copies. Rich Egan, who became the band's manager shortly after the release of Big Choice, has recalled that "'Disconnected' was on the radio and the band was getting bigger by the day. It was just GO GO GO from day one."

== Legacy ==
The relative success of "Disconnected" helped Face to Face to gain more exposure and popularity, and the song became a standard for the band for the rest of their career. AllMusic reviewer Vincent Jeffries recalls that the song was an "alt-rock radio mega-hit", while Tracy Fey comments that the Over It version is "a rawer, less polished version than the one that appears on Big Choice, but the power and catchiness are still there", remarking that "Disconnected" and "I Used to Think" "stand out as the backbone of the EP" and that the Big Choice version is "a bit heavier".

"Disconnected" (live)
Sample of a live performance of "Disconnected" from Shoot the Moon: The Essential Collection, recorded at the band's farewell performance in 2004. A Punknews.org review notes that "The amount of energy and conviction put into this song is only challenged by the energy and conviction of every single kid in the audience that night singing along".

After Face to Face's breakup in 2004, Keith released a compilation album entitled Shoot the Moon: The Essential Collection through his Antagonist Records label. It includes the original version of "Disconnected" from Don't Turn Away as the album's opening track, and a live version of the song recorded at the band's farewell performance on September 19, 2004 at the House of Blues in Hollywood, California as the closing track. A review of the album on Punknews.org remarks that it is "Fitting that the live version of 'Disconnected' finishes this retrospective just as it started, more fitting that it was the final song recorded from their final live performance, in their home of Southern California," calling "Disconnected" "the band's most well known song" and "one of the best punk songs of the '90s."

== Format and track listing ==
US 7" single (FAT 511)

1. "Disconnected" (Keith, Riddle) – 3:26
2. "AOK" (Keith, Riddle) – 3:00
3. "I Used to Think" (Keith, Riddle) – 3:04

== Personnel ==
Don't Turn Away, US 7" single, and Over It versions

- Trever Keith – vocals, guitar
- Rob Kurth – drums, backing vocals
- Matt Riddle – bass guitar, backing vocals

Big Choice version

- Trever Keith – vocals, guitar
- Rob Kurth – drums, backing vocals
- Matt Riddle – bass guitar, backing vocals
- Chad Yaro – guitar

== Charts ==
Chart (1995)	Peak position
US Modern Rock Tracks	39

Chart (2021)	Peak position
Hungary (Single Top 40)	32
