= The Longest Line =

EP by NOFX
- Released: May 1, 1992
- Recorded: January 1992 at Westbeach Recorders, Hollywood, California
- Genre: Punk rock, ska punk
- Length: 13:50
- Label: Fat Wreck Chords

NOFX chronology
Ribbed (1991)	The Longest Line (1992)	White Trash, Two Heebs and a Bean (1992)

Professional ratings
Review scores
Source	Rating
Allmusic	link

The Longest Line is a 12" EP by the punk rock band NOFX, released in 1992. This was the first release on Fat Wreck Chords and the cover art was done by Dan Sites. The first 200 copies of this record were printed on dark-blue vinyl, some on grey vinyl, and all others on black vinyl. It was repressed in 2007 with 1,082 copies on "Peruvian" white vinyl. This coloured version sold out within a day. The band denied all suggestions that the title referred to cocaine.

The pop punk band Blink (later Blink-182) covered "The Longest Line" on their demo tape Flyswatter.

All five songs were later released on The Longest EP.

== Track listing ==
1. "The Death of John Smith" – 3:51
2. "The Longest Line" – 2:04
3. "Stranded" – 2:09
4. "Remnants" – 2:58
5. "Kill All the White Man" – 2:48

== Personnel ==
- El Hefe – Guitar, Trumpet and Vocals on "Kill All The White Man" and "The Death of John Smith"
- Eric Melvin – Guitar
- Fat Mike – Bass, Lead Vocals
- Erik Sandin – Drums
