= Before You Were Punk =

Compilation album by Vagrant Records
- Released: March 11, 1997
- Genre: Punk rock
- Length: 38:36
- Label: Vagrant Records

Vagrant Records chronology
Before You Were Punk (1997)	Before You Were Punk 2 (1999)

Professional ratings
Review scores
Source	Rating
Allmusic	2.5/5 stars

Before You Were Punk is a compilation album released in 1997 by Vagrant Records. It consists of a number of mid-1990s punk rock bands (most of them from southern California) covering songs that were popularised during the 1980s "new wave" musical movement. It was an ambitious release for the label, which was still in its early stages, and proved to be a success by selling over 70,000 copies. It was followed by an equally successful sequel, Before You Were Punk 2, in 1999.

Because Vagrant Records did not yet have an extensive roster of artists, the compilation relied mostly on contributions from bands on other record labels. Only Face to Face and Automatic 7 had previously released records through Vagrant. By contrast, Before You Were Punk 2 would feature more bands that had signed to the label between 1997 and 1999.

== Track listing ==
Original performers shown in parentheses
No.	Title	Writer(s)	Artist	Length
1.	"I Melt with You" (Modern English)	Robbie Grey, Gary McDowell, Stephen Walker, Michael Conroy, Richard Brown	Good Riddance	2:23
2.	"Turning Japanese" (The Vapors)	David Fenton	No Use for a Name	3:29
3.	"In Between Days" (The Cure)	Robert Smith, Dave Allen	Face to Face	2:58
4.	"Happy Loving Couples" (Joe Jackson)	Joe Jackson	Guttermouth	2:34
5.	"Pretty in Pink" (The Psychedelic Furs)	Richard Butler, John Ashton, Roger Morris, Tim Butler, Duncan Kilburn, Vince Ely	Automatic 7	3:11
6.	"Goody Two Shoes" (Adam Ant)	Adam Ant, Marco Pirroni	Unwritten Law	3:33
7.	"Dancing with Myself" (Generation X)	Billy Idol, Tony James	Blink-182	2:57
8.	"Crash" (The Primitives)	Paul Court, Steve Dullaghan, Tracey Tracey	The Mr. T Experience	1:56
9.	"Peace, Love and Understanding" (Elvis Costello)	Nick Lowe	Down by Law	3:22
10.	"Walking in L.A." (Missing Persons)	Terry Bozzio	Hagfish	3:54
11.	"Young Turks" (Rod Stewart)	Rod Stewart, Carmine Appice, Duane Hitchings, Kevin Savigar	Jughead's Revenge	3:57
12.	"867-5309/Jenny" (Tommy Tutone)	Alex Call, Jim Keller	Bracket	4:22

== Album information ==
- Record label: Vagrant Records
- Art direction by Andrew Lenoski, Rich Egan and Jon Cohen
- Recording and mixing:
  - Tracks 1, 2, and 3 recorded and mixed by Ryan Greene at Razor's Edge Studios in San Francisco, California
  - Tracks 4, 5, 7, 9, and 11 recorded and mixed by Kiley and Dan at Doghouse Studios in Van Nuys, California
  - Track 6 recorded and mixed by Scott Axum and Don Lithgow at DML Studios.
  - Track 8 recorded and mixed by Kevin Army at Roof Bros. Studios in Oakland, California
  - Track 10 recorded and mixed by Jeff Bridges at Big Noise Studios
  - Track 12 recorded and mixed by Jowe Marquez at Prairie Sun Studios
- Horns on track 6 performed by Buck-O-Nine horn section
