= No Motiv =

US musical group

- Origin: Oxnard, California
- Genres: Punk rock, post-hardcore, alternative rock, melodic emocore
- Years active: 1995–present
- Labels: Vagrant, Edge, Siren
- Members: Jeremy Palaszewski; Roger Camero; Max McDonald; Pat Pedraza
- Past members: Jeff Hershey; Dave Brandon
- Website: www.nomotiv.com

No Motiv is a punk rock band from Oxnard, California. The most recent version of the line up as of their 2019 performances includes Jeremy Palaszewski on lead vocals and guitar, Max McDonald on guitar and vocals, Roger Camero on bass and vocals, and Pat Pedraza on drums. For the recording of the LOLA EP, Daylight Breaking, and Winterlong, Camero moved from bass to drums after drummer Pedraza left the band to join alternative rock band From Satellite. The group has not released a full album since Winterlong in 2011, though they did release a remastered edition of And the Sadness Prevails... and a 2-track EP in 2019. Throughout the band's activity and lineup changes, they have also formed several notable side projects. The group is part of the second generation of Nardcore.

== History ==
No Motiv was founded by Jeremy Palaszewski and Pat Pedraza in 1993, in Oxnard CA.

Their first album, Cynical, was distributed by Edge Records. Their second album, Scarred, is a collection of unreleased demos and remixes also released by Edge Records, which they did not consult the band about, such as which songs the band intended to include on their Vagrant Records debut, ...And The Sadness Prevails. No Motiv subsequently left Edge for unspecified reasons. The band signed to Vagrant Records and had success with the 2004 release Daylight Breaking, which reached No. 36 on Billboard's Top Independent albums chart.

No Motiv has played only a handful of live shows since 2014. While the band has never released an official statement announcing their breakup, they are considered to be on hiatus and inactive. Jeremy and Jeff reside in Ventura, CA, and started recording material under a new band called Monster Hand, which was disbanded shortly after. Palaszewski then started a solo projects entitled Sea Greens and Hershey, and assembled a soul group Jeff Hershey and The Heartbeats. Max lives in Brooklyn, NY and has been recording material under the solo moniker Gentlemen. Roger resides in Irvine, CA, and plays bass for Peace'd Out, and writes songs under the name He Fails Me. All band members remain in contact and are involved in various side projects in addition to the ones mentioned above, such as Hybrid Moments, Death Country Blue, and Machines.

On September 20, 2019, No Motiv the band announced they would be celebrating the 20th anniversary of their Vagrant Records debut album, And the Sadness Prevails..., by releasing a remastered version of the album digitally and on limited edition vinyl, along with 2 bonus tracks. The announcement came with a preview of the remastered version of the album's first track, "Nostalgia." On October 18 the band released a new music video for their acoustic rendition of "Life Goes On" from Daylight Breaking. On October 24, 2019, they released another new music video, this time featuring the band performing live with the remastered recording of "The Waiting Hurt" layered over it. Alongside the remastered edition of the album, they also released an EP digitally and on vinyl that features a remastered version of "Broken and Burned" from Diagram for Healing, and the aforementioned acoustic rendition of "Life Goes On." The original recording lineup for And the Sadness Prevails..., featuring Roger Camero on bass and Pat Pedraza on drums, reunited to play 2 shows on November 1 and 2, 2019.

While the band has not formally reunited or become fully active, Roger Camero noted that: "We're not trying to make a living doing anything No Motiv related. We're just enjoying each other's company and being thankful for having people enjoy our band and care about it. So, whatever opportunities that we can do, we can partake in collectively, we're very thankful for." When discussing the fact that other bands such as Face to Face had taken nine years between album releases, and that perhaps the 20th anniversary celebration of And the Sadness Prevails... could lead to a formal return for the band, Roger Camero added: "We work within our means, and we're a bunch of very realistic dudes. I think we honestly enjoy the fact that we could do this, and it's not like the success— or whatever— of what we do is going to dictate whether or not we put food on the table. Like, this is just straight up for our enjoyment, and fans of the band's enjoyment, and it does not need to be anything more than that, because we've all come into our own in our lives and we're all happy, so it's cool."

== Members ==
=== Current members ===
- Jeremy Palaszewski (pronounced 'Pala-shef-ski') – guitar, lead vocals
- Max McDonald – guitar, vocals
- Jeff Hershey – bass, vocals
- Roger Camero – drums

=== Former members ===
- Pat Pedraza – drums
- Dave Brandon – bass

== Discography ==
- 1995: No Motiv 7-inch (It's Alive Records)
- 1996: No Motiv / The Choice split 7-inch (It's Alive Records)
- 1996: Cynical (Edge Records)
- 1998: Scarred (Edge Records)
- 1999: And the Sadness Prevails... (Vagrant Records)
- 2001: Diagram for Healing (Vagrant Records)
- 2003: LOLA EP (Vagrant Records)
- 2004: Daylight Breaking (Vagrant Records)
- 2011: Winterlong EP (Siren)
- 2019: And the Sadness Prevails... (20th Anniversary Edition) [2019 Remastered] (Vagrant Records)
- 2019: Broken and Burned/Life Goes On 7-inch (Vagrant Records)

The song "Independence Day" was featured on the soundtrack of the video game Burnout 3, the songs "Give Me Strength," "Going Numb," and "To The Roots" were featured on the soundtrack of the video game TransWorld Surf. Their cover of "Space Age Love Song" is featured in Not Another Teen Movie.
