= Falling to Pieces (disambiguation) =

"Falling to Pieces" is a 1990 song by Faith No More.

Falling to Pieces may also refer to:

- "Falling to Pieces" (Firewind song), 2006
- "Breakeven (Falling to Pieces)", by The Script, 2008
- "Falling to Pieces", a song by Rita Ora from the deluxe version of her 2018 album Phoenix
- "Falling to Pieces", a song by Marshmello and Crankdat from the 2019 album Joytime III

== See also ==
- Fall to Pieces (disambiguation)
