= Kalyn =

Kalyn and Kalynn are given names. Notable people with these name include:

== Kalyn ==
- Kalyn Chapman (born 1970), American model, TV host, beauty pageant titleholder from Alabama
- Jannelle Kalyn Flaws (born 1991), American soccer player
- Kalyn Free, American attorney, political candidate, tribal citizen of the Choctaw Nation of Oklahoma
- Kalyn Heffernan, MC for the Krip Hop band Wheelchair Sports Camp
- Kalyn Keller (born 1985), American former Olympic swimmer
- Kalyn Ponga (born 1998), Australian professional rugby league footballer
- Kalyn Schwartz (born 1989), American mixed martial artist

== Kalynn ==
- Kalynn Campbell (born 1960), American artist and writer
- Kalynn Park (born 1988), Canadian curler and curling coach

== See also ==
- Kaylin (given name), including people named Kaylyn
