= Kalynn Campbell =

American artist and writer (born 1960)

- Born: R. Kalynn Campbell Jr. January 1, 1960 (age 66); Jupiter, Florida, U.S.
- Other name: Skip
- Occupations: Artist, illustrator, cartoonist and write/poet
- Years active: 1973–present
- Known for: Art and illustration, cartoons
- Notable work: Paintings in the Kustom Kulture art movement, 'She of Thorn' book of poetry

R. Kalynn Campbell Jr (born 1960), is an American artist, illustrator, cartoonist and writer/poet. He is best known for his work in the Lowbrow/Kustom Kulture movement, wherein he has been referred to as "one of the most influential of the California Lowbrow artists". As an illustrator, he created album/CD covers for notable bands such as Megadeth (Album - Capitol Punishment: The Megadeth Years), Reverend Horton Heat (Album - Lucky 7), and Social Distortion (Album - White Light, White Heat, White Trash). His political cartoons were a fixture in Paul Krassner's The Realist magazine from 1985 to 2001.

== Early years ==
Campbell grew up in the small town of Jupiter, Florida, United States. As a child, he was nicknamed "Skip", a nickname he eventually dropped after moving to California. At the age of 10, while recuperating from a tonsillectomy, a family friend brought him a stack of underground comix, a gesture that would have a lasting impact on his art.

At 13, he became the cartoonist of his middle school's publication, Smoke Signals, and began selling Ed Roth-inspired hot rod drawings at local craft fairs. The same year he enrolled in a mail-order cartoon course. During this period, he was heavily influenced by "freak shows and drug shows" that came to the South Florida Fair every year. At the age of 17, Campbell was hired by the Outlaws motorcycle club to airbrush motorcycle tanks while at the same time working for a local radio station magazine as a concert photographer, photographing major stadium rock acts such as Aerosmith and Van Halen. After graduating high school, Campbell attended film school, but was soon expelled after a series of vandalistic "pranks".

== Berkeley/San Francisco years ==
After being expelled, Campbell's parents bought him a one-way ticket to San Francisco and soon after arriving in the Bay Area, he began self-publishing minicomics. At a comix artist party he attended with Dori Seda, Campbell met Gay Comics editor Robert Triptow. Both Triptow and Campbell worked together soon after, first on "Pork Grease Fantasies" and again on Gay Comix#8 (which featured Campbell's cover art, even though Campbell was heterosexual). When underground comix artist and painter Robert Williams came to Berkeley to show his latest work, The Zombie Mystery Paintings Campbell was deeply influenced by William's work and began creating work in a similar vein.

Around this time, Campbell met underground satirist Paul Krassner. Krassner offered him the job of lead cartoonist for THE REALIST magazine which Krassner was bringing back after a long hiatus. Campbell took and held that position, illustrating the majority of the covers including final issue published in the spring of 2001. Campbell's relationship with Krassner went deeper than just that of The Realist and Campbell illustrated the majority of Paul's CD and book covers during this period. In 2017 Fantagraphics Books released the book The Realist Cartoons in which Campbell's work makes up the bulk of the last chapter.

During the early 1980s, Campbell found himself attracted to Punk Rock and in 1984 started his own fanzine, Spastic Culture Magazine. The magazine reflected the punk aesthetic (band interviews and show reviews) but also contained fringe art subjects such as performance art, mail art, and comix art. Among the contributors were Bill Griffith and S. Clay Wilson.

A year later Campbell moved to San Francisco and attended the Academy of Art College's fine art program where he met instructor Carl Loeffler who would become Campbell's mentor. Loeffler ran the acclaimed La Mamelle, Inc./Art Com performance space and Campbell would often do public performances in the renowned art space ahead of bands, among his performances was sawing life-sized cut-outs of actresses Marilyn Monroe and Jane Mansfield into small pieces. Loeffler was also the publisher of the ARTCOM ELECTRONIC LINK, one of the first online art magazines, which Campbell guest-edited in 1986.

Loeffler introduced Campbell to the Bay Area Dadaists, of which Campbell became a member. It was in this period that he became involved in creating artistamps (faux postal stamps) – some of which are now in major collections – including that of the John Held Jr. collection housed in the Museum of Modern Art Library, NY, and he is listed in the International Directory of Artistamp Creators. In 1993, Campbell's stamp art was part of a major artist stamp show at the Musee de la Poste postal art museum in Paris, the show's catalog later released as the book timbres d' artistes featuring his work. In 1990, he received a Visual Grants Award to create commemorative stamps and envelopes for the city of Los Angeles as part of the opening celebration of the Metro Blue Line. Campbell continues to produce artistamps, most notably is his stamp work (and show poster) for the 2018 gallery show at Sugar Press held in tandem with the 25th anniversary of the punk band Face to Face.

Campbell was heavily influenced by the cognitive play of performance art as is evident in his fine arts graduation show from the Academy of Art Collage in April 1987 in which he painted large raw canvases to resemble KFC napkins then sent the canvases to selected celebrities with the request they do something to it and send it back. Among the contributors to Campbell's show was artist Yoko Ono and filmmaker John Waters.

== Los Angeles years ==
Having finished art school, Campbell began working on a series of paintings resembling game-boards and dart-boards and Robert Williams encouraged him to bring the work to Los Angeles, where a small movement of artists with similar visual sensibilities was slowly taking shape. Campbell made the move to LA and began showing at the infamous Zero One (0-1) Gallery. He was later represented by the La Luz de Jesus Gallery. As part of the Lowbrow/Kustom Kulture movement, Campbell's work has been displayed in six museum shows and countless gallery shows. His work has been called "American Hieroglyphics", "mixing 40's style imagery with '60s hot rod aesthetics using imagery as metaphors for everyday life".

As an illustrator in the music industry, he got his start with BRC in 1990, working as the assistant art director to clients Tom Petty, Michael Jackson and other major rock acts.

As a writer/poet, he has written two novels and published one book of poetry, SHE OF THORN, which was written in 2015 after a love affair with a married woman and documents his personal struggle with AvPD

== Personal life ==
Campbell was married in 1997 but divorced in 2011. He now lives in Hollywood, California.

== Selected CD art ==
1. Capitol Punishment: The Megadeth Years (2000) by Megadeth
2. Lucky 7 (album) (2002), by The Reverend Horton Heat
3. White Light, White Heat, White Trash (1996) by Social Distortion
4. How to Ruin Everything (2002) by Face to Face (punk band)
5. A Place in the Sun (Lit album) (1999) by Lit (band)
