= Viva Death =

American rock band

- Origin: California
- Genres: Alternative rock
- Years active: 2002–present
- Labels: Vagrant Records; Functional Equivalent Recordings
- Members: Scott Shiflett; Trever Keith; Chris Shiflett; Josh Freese; Chad Blinman
- Website: vivadeath.com

Viva Death are an American rock band formed from members of the bands Face to Face, Foo Fighters, and the Vandals. They have released three albums. Viva Death are known for using baritone guitars rather than normal guitars to achieve their unique sound.

== Members ==
- Scott Shiflett – Baritone guitar, vocals
- Trever Keith – Baritone guitar, vocals
- Chris Shiflett – Baritone guitar
- Josh Freese – Drums
- Chad Blinman – Noises and Effects

== Discography ==
- Viva Death (September 2002)
- One Percent Panic (October 31, 2006)
- Curse the Darkness (May 11, 2010)
- Illuminate (October 2018)
