= Trever Keith =

Background information
- Born: May 28, 1969 (age 56)
- Genres: Punk rock, mashup
- Occupations: Musician, songwriter
- Instruments: Vocals, guitar, bass guitar, keyboard, drums
- Years active: 1987–present
- Labels: Dr. Strange, Fat Wreck Chords, Victory Music, A&M, Vagrant, Antagonist

Trever Keith (born May 28, 1969) is an American musician, producer and record label owner from Victorville, California, United States. He is the founding member of the So-Cal punk group Face to Face and has been the singer and guitarist of the band since their inception in 1991. Keith is also the owner and founder of the independent record labels Lady Luck Records, Antagonist Records and Folsom Records.

Outside of his work with Face to Face, Keith was also a part of the remix and mash-up duo The Legion of Doom and alternative rock group Viva Death. Additionally, in February 2008 he released a solo album titled Melancholics Anonymous.

== Biography ==
=== Pre-Face to Face ===
After graduating high school in 1987, Keith formed a metal band with friends Matt Riddle, Matthew Altmire, and Rick Altmire. The band was named Victoria Manor. The band played shows in the high desert and recorded a three-song demo. After several years the band members parted ways and Keith and Riddle formed a new band called Zero Tolerance with drummer Rob Kurth and guitarist Mark Haake. Zero Tolerance drew heavily upon Keith's new wave influences but like Victoria Manor last just a short period of time.

=== Face to Face ===
After Zero Tolerance disbanded in early 1991, Keith formed Face to Face with bassist Matt Riddle and drummer Rob Kurth. Cited as a seminal California punk group, Face to Face has released nine full-length albums in their nearly 25-year history. In 2004 Face to Face disbanded to allow the band members the opportunity to focus on other projects. During this time, the band released a CD/DVD compilation, Shoot the Moon, on Keith's label, Antagonist Records. The DVD features a career retrospective documentary 'Punk Rock Eats Its Own - A Film About Face to Face' along with the band's final performance from their 'Only Goodbye Tour' at the House Of Blues in Los Angeles, CA on September 19, 2004.

On January 29, 2008, Keith announced via Face to Face's official website that the band had reunited, for a number of shows in the US. On April 5, 2008, the band performed together for the first time in four years at The Bamboozle Left festival in Orange County, CA. Since then the band has continued to perform numerous live shows since and has recorded 3 more records.

=== Outside Face to Face ===
In 1999 Keith produced the album Blindside by the band Peel fronted by former Ridel High singer Kevin Ridel. After Face to Face's initial break up in 2004, Keith retreated out of the limelight to focus on several music projects including, his debut solo record, his record label Antagonist Records, and also formed the remix / mash-up duo The Legion of Doom with creative partner Chad Blinman. Keith also contributed to the Once Percent Panic album as member of the band Viva Death along with face to face bassist Scott Shiflett. Also, Keith was a guest vocalist on "People Like You Are Why People Like Me Exist" by Say Anything.

=== Solo career ===
In February 2008, Keith released his debut solo album Melancholics Anonymous on his own label Antagonist Records. The album was also released digitally via his official website, where it was available to purchase for the price of $5, and available to stream in full for free. The CD version was limited to 1000 hand-signed & numbered copies, available only during his solo tour in 2008 and Warped Tour 2010. His Americana single "Heading South" dropped on May 28, 2021.

=== Production ===
Keith has recorded and produced several records, most notably for Vagrant Records bands No Motiv and Moneen. Keith has also produced records for Viva Death, Death On Wednesday, Jughead's Revenge and Seconds To Go.

== Selected discography ==
Album Year	Album name	Band	Record label	Credits
1989	Demo	Victoria Manor	Self-released	Vocals and keyboards
1990	Demo	Zero Tolerance	Self-released	Vocals and guitar
1991	Demo	Face to Face	Self-released	Vocals and guitar
1992	Don't Turn Away	Face to Face	Dr. Strange Records, Fat Wreck Chords (re-issue)	Vocals and guitar
1994	Over It	Face to Face	Victory Records	Vocals and guitar
1995	Big Choice	Face to Face	A&M Records	Vocals and guitar
1996	Face to Face	Face to Face	A&M Records	Vocals, Guitar, Producer
1997	Before You Were Punk	Various Artists	Vagrant Records	Vocals and guitar on Face to Face's cover of "In Between Days" by The Cure
1998	Live	Face to Face	VP	Vocals and guitar
1998	Just Joined	Jughead's Revenge	Nitro Records	Producer
1999	Blindside	Peel	Beyond Music (later self-released)	Producer
1999	Standards & Practices	Face to Face	Vagrant Records	Vocals and guitar
1999	Ignorance Is Bliss	Face to Face	Beyond Music	Vocals, Guitar, Producer
1999	And the Sadness Prevails	No Motiv	Vagrant Records	Producer
2000	Reactionary	Face to Face	Vagrant Records	Vocals, Guitar, Producer
2000	Buying the Lie	Death on Wednesday	SideCho Records	Producer
2001	Diagram for Healing	No Motiv	Vagrant Records	Producer
2002	How to Ruin Everything	Face to Face	Vagrant Records	Vocals, Guitar, Producer
2002	Split with Dropkick Murphys	Face to Face/Dropkick Murphys	Vagrant Records	Vocals, Guitar, Producer
2002	Space Camp	Audio Karate	Kung Fu Records	Producer
2003	Are We Really Happy With Who We Are Right Now	Moneen	Vagrant Records	Producer
2003	Viva Death	Viva Death	Vagrant Records	Vocals, Guitar (Baritone), Producer
2005	Shoot the Moon: Essential Collection	Face to Face	Antagonist Records	Vocals and guitar
2006	One Percent Panic	Viva Death	Functional Equivalent	Vocals, Guitar (Baritone), Producer
2008	Melancholics Anonymous	Trever Keith	Antagonist Records	Written and Performed (Vocals and Instruments), Producer
2011	Laugh Now, Laugh Later	Face to Face	Antagonist Records	Vocals, Guitar
2013	Three Chords And A Half Truth	Face to Face	Antagonist Records	Vocals, Guitar
2016	Protection	Face to Face	Fat Wreck Chords	Vocals, Guitar
2021	No Way Out But Through	Face to Face	Fat Wreck Chords	Vocals, Guitar

Singles

- "Heading South" (2021)
