= One Percent Panic =

Studio album by Viva Death
- Released: October 2006
- Genre: Rock
- Label: Functional Equivalent Recordings
- Producer: Scott Shiflett, Trever Keith, Chad Blinman

Viva Death chronology
| Viva Death (2002) | One Percent Panic (2006) | Curse the Darkness (2010) |

One Percent Panic is the second full-length album by the California rock band Viva Death. The album was released in 2006 on Functional Equivalent Recordings.

== Track listing ==
1. "Broken Nose"
2. "Be Excited"
3. "Suspect"
4. "You Can't Love"
5. "Behind You, Soldier"
6. "United by the Threat of a Common Enemy"
7. "Defector"
8. "Rise and Shine"
9. "The Fear"
10. "Damage Control"
11. "White Car"
12. "Into the Void"

== Credits ==
- Scott Shiflett – Baritone guitar, vocals
- Trever Keith – Baritone guitar, vocals
- Chris Shiflett – Baritone guitar
- Josh Freese – Drums
- Chad Blinman – Noises and Effects

=== Additional musicians ===
- Jason Freese (Baritone saxophone, Behind You, Soldier)
- Reiko Yoshida (Poetry reading, Defector)
