= Ribbed: Live in a Dive =

Live album by NOFX
- Released: August 3, 2018
- Recorded: Mayan Theater, Los Angeles; December 13, 2012
- Genre: Punk rock
- Length: 39:46
- Label: Fat Wreck Chords
- Producer: Cameron Webb, Tardon Lawrence

NOFX chronology
Hepatitis Bathtub (2016)	Ribbed: Live in a Dive (2018)	West Coast vs. Wessex (2020)

Live in a Dive chronology
Lagwagon (2005)	NOFX (2018)	Face to Face (2019)

Professional ratings
Review scores
Source	Rating
The Spill Magazine	3.5/5 stars
Hysteria	6/10 stars

Ribbed: Live in a Dive is an album by American punk band NOFX; it is the band's third live album and the eighth installment of their Live in a Dive series. Released on August 3, 2018 by Fat Wreck Chords, the album is a live presentation of their songs from the 1991 studio album Ribbed. The album was recorded in 2012 from their concert at the Mayan Theater in Los Angeles.

== Background ==
On May 4, 2018 it was announced that the series would return and that Ribbed: Live in a Dive would be issued in August of that year. It was also announced that a song from the album could be heard on the compilation album Fat Music for Wrecked People: Punk in Drublic 2018, which was released in May 2018. This turned out to be "Just the Flu", which was made available for streaming later that year. In June 2018 the song "Cheese/Where's My Slice" was also put online.

Ribbed: Live in a Dive is the first album in the Live in a Dive series in over 13 years after the release of Live in a Dive by Lagwagon. It is the first album with a different title and also the first album in the series that is a live version of a previously released album. Fat Wreck Chords made it known to release albums in the series again.

== Track listing ==
1. "Green Corn" - 2:41
2. "The Moron Brothers" - 2:50
3. "Showerdays" - 2:38
4. "Food, Sex & Ewe" - 2:48
5. "Just the Flu" - 2:10
6. "El Lay" - 2:10
7. "New Boobs" - 4:16
8. "Cheese/Where's My Slice?" - 2:16
9. "Together on the Sand" - 1:33
10. "Nowhere" - 1:33
11. "Brain Constipation" - 2:42
12. "Gonoherpasyphilaids" - 2:21
13. "I Don't Want You Around" - 2:59
14. "The Malachi Crunch" - 3:49

== Personnel ==
Performers

- Fat Mike - bass, vocals
- Eric Melvin - rhythm guitar
- Erik Sandin - drums
- El Hefe - guitar, trumpet

Production

- Kent Jamieson - recording
- Cameron Webb - mixing
- Tardon Lawrence - mastering

Artwork

- Chris Shearer - artwork, layout
