= Ribbed =

Studio album by NOFX
- Released: March 26, 1991
- Recorded: September 1990
- Studios: Westbeach Recorders, Hollywood, California
- Genre: Punk rock
- Length: 28:31
- Label: Epitaph
- Producer: Brett Gurewitz

NOFX chronology
Maximum Rocknroll (1989)	Ribbed (1991)	The Longest Line (1992)

Ribbed is the third studio album by the American punk rock band NOFX, released in 1991 through Epitaph Records. It was their last album to feature Steve Kidwiler on guitar; he was replaced by El Hefe. Ribbed is also the last NOFX album produced by Brett Gurewitz, who also produced their first two Epitaph albums. The album sold 8,000 copies upon its release.

In 2018, NOFX released the album Ribbed: Live in a Dive, a recording of a 2012 concert where the band played Ribbed in its entirety.

== Critical reception ==
Professional ratings
Review scores
Source	Rating
AllMusic	2/5 stars
Robert Christgau	(2-star Honorable Mention)
The Encyclopedia of Popular Music	3/5 stars
MusicHound Rock: The Essential Album Guide	3.5/5 stars
The New Rolling Stone Album Guide	2/5 stars

The Encyclopedia of Popular Music called the album "an unblemished collection of genuinely funny songs." Trouser Press wrote that "Mike doesn’t alter his bratty delivery, but the record’s increased use of harmonies would become permanent."

== Track listing ==
All songs by Fat Mike except "Together on the Sand," by Steve Kidwiler.

No.	Title	Length
1.	"Green Corn"	1:44
2.	"The Moron Brothers"	2:26
3.	"Showerdays"	2:10
4.	"Food, Sex & Ewe"	1:47
5.	"Just the Flu"	2:03
6.	"El Lay"	1:14
7.	"New Boobs"	3:27
8.	"Cheese/Where's My Slice"	2:16
9.	"Together on the Sand"	1:11
10.	"Nowhere"	1:34
11.	"Brain Constipation"	2:24
12.	"Gonoherpasyphilaids"	1:43
13.	"I Don't Want You Around"	1:39
14.	"The Malachi Crunch"	2:53
Total length:		28:31

== Personnel ==
NOFX

- Fat Mike – lead and backing vocals, bass
- Eric Melvin – guitar, backing vocals
- Steve Kidwiler – guitar, backing vocals, lead vocals on "Together on the Sand"
- Erik Sandin (Groggy Nodbeggar) – drums

Additional personnel

- Jay Bentley – backing vocals
- Mark Curry – backing vocals
- Dave Smalley – high-pitched crooning vocals on "New Boobs" (not credited)
- Donnell Cameron – maracas
- Brett Gurewitz – producer, güiro, bongos
