= Live (Face to Face album) =

Live album by Face to Face
- Released: January 27, 1998
- Recorded: September 1997 in Los Angeles, California
- Genre: Punk rock
- Label: Imports
- Producer: Face to Face

Face to Face chronology
Face to Face (1996)	Live (1998)	Standards & Practices (1999)

Live is a live album released by the punk band Face to Face in 1998, recorded in Los Angeles in September 1997.

== Track listing ==
1. Walk the Walk
2. I Want
3. Blind
4. I'm Not Afraid
5. It's Not Over
6. I Won't Lie Down
7. You Lied
8. Ordinary
9. I'm Trying
10. Telling Them (Social Distortion cover)
11. Don't Turn Away
12. A.O.K.
13. Complicated
14. Not for Free
15. Pastel
16. Do You Care
17. Dissension
18. You've Done Nothing
- Tracks 1, 3, 6, 8, and 13 originally recorded for Face to Face (1996)
- Tracks 2, 4, 9, 15, and 17 originally recorded for Don't Turn Away (1992)
- Track 5, 7, and 12 originally recorded for Big Choice (1995)
- Track 11 originally recorded for Over It (1994)
- Track 14 originally recorded for A Strange Compilation (1992)
- Track 16 originally recorded for Rikk Agnew’s Smash Demos, Vol. II (1994)
