= Jackson United =

American punk rock band

- Jackson United performing in November 2008

Background information
- Origin: California, United States
- Genres: Punk rock
- Years active: 2002–2008 (hiatus)
- Labels: Magnificent, Deck Cheese
- Members: Chris Shiflett; Scott Shiflett; Doug Sangalang; Joe Sirois
- Past members: Pete Parada; Cary Lascala; Omen Starr
- Website: jacksonunited.com

Jackson United is an American punk rock band, formed by singer and lead guitarist Chris Shiflett in 2002. Shiflett recruited his older brother Scott Shiflett (bass) and Pete Parada (drums) to complete the band. A debut eponymous EP was recorded and released in 2003. Shortly after this release Parada left the band. He was replaced by Cary Lascala, and the group was then further expanded with the addition of a rhythm guitarist, Doug Sangalang.

Scott Shiflett left the band in 2004, replaced by Omen Starr. The band released its first full-length album, Western Ballads in 2004. After touring, Lascala and Starr departed, and Scott then returned to band in 2005. 2008 saw the release of their second full-length album, Harmony And Dissidence. As the band was without a drummer at the time, Foo Fighters bandmate Dave Grohl offered Chris his services, along with bandmate Taylor Hawkins.

== Formation and debut EP (2002-3) ==
Chris Shiflett, more famously known as Foo Fighters and Me First and the Gimme Gimmes guitarist, formed the band as his own side project after years of playing a supporting role in other songwriters' successes, and had the desire to release material he had written on his own.

Shiflett first formed the band during a halt at the recording of the Foo Fighters' One by One, Their eponymous debut EP was released on 20 October 2003, featuring five tracks recorded by the trio in early 2003.

== Name and line up changes ==
Shortly after the debut EP release Parada left the band due to his full-time commitment as the then-drummer of Saves The Day. Replacing him was Cary LaScala who had enjoyed a brief stint as a member of Communiqué. The group was then further expanded with the addition of a second guitarist, Doug Sangalang.

In 2004 the band decided to change their name due to the difficulty of obtaining any form of legal protection over simply 'Jackson'. It was considered to be too common a word to be granted copyright. They therefore elected to simply add 'United' to the name, and have since been known as Jackson United. Shortly after this Scott announced his departure from the band, citing a desire to spend more time at home. He was replaced by Top Brown's Omen Starr.

== Harmony and Dissidence (2007–2008) ==
In January and February 2007, Shiflett left many updates on the band's official postboard regarding their current recording sessions. Still without a full-time drummer, Foo Fighters bandmates Dave Grohl and Taylor Hawkins were revealed to be sharing the drumming work. "Well it was just a lucky turn of events where we tried to start tracking drums with this other guy and it didn’t really work. Dave dropped by the studio one day and I told him what was going on and he offered up his services... he also offered up Taylor’s services", Shiflett told an online fanzine.

== Band members ==
=== Current members ===
- Chris Shiflett – lead vocals, lead guitar (2002–2008 (hiatus) )
- Scott Shiflett – bass guitar (2002–2004, 2004–2008 (hiatus) )
- Doug Sangalang – rhythm guitar, backing vocals (2004–2008 (hiatus) )
- Joe Sirois – drums, backing vocals (2008 – hiatus)

=== Former members ===
- Pete Parada - drums (2002–2003)
- Cary Lascala - drums (2003–2007)
- Omen Starr - bass guitar (2004)

=== Current touring members ===
- Charlie Ellis - bass guitar (2008)

== Discography ==
- Jackson (EP) (2003)
- Western Ballads (2004)
- Harmony and Dissidence (2008)
