= The Legion of Doom (music producers) =

Band

- Genres: Mashup, post-hardcore, electronic
- Years active: 2000–present
- Label: Illegal Art
- Members: Chad Blinman; Trever Keith
- Website: www.the-legion-of-doom.com

The Legion of Doom is a music production team and electronic music group, known for their download-only mashup album Incorporated, remixes, and original music for horror soundtracks.

== History ==
The Legion of Doom consists of Chad Blinman and Trever Keith (of the California punk band Face to Face). Having worked together on many recording and production projects beginning in 1997, the two formed the Legion of Doom in 2004 to undertake a series of specialized creative projects.

In 2005, they served as the producer for Senses Fail's cover of the song "Institutionalized", which was to appear on the soundtrack for Tony Hawk's American Wasteland.

The first of these projects was Incorporated, a mash-up album featuring mixes of various punk and hardcore bands. The album was completed in 2006, but due to some of the artists unwilling to allow the album to be released, the group recommended downloading the album after it was leaked from sources outside of the group off P2P Networks. The leak was the result of the entire album's MP3 files being left in an unprotected folder on the group's website. On March 6, 2007, the album was released in physical format through the label Illegal Art.

The Legion of Doom has also contributed remixes and original music to film soundtracks such as Underworld: Evolution, Saw II and the Las Vegas TV series. Other projects include the original score and music supervision for independent film Eyes Front and an album of original material (The Legion of Doom vs Triune).

The Legion of Doom regularly use samples of dialog from old films and other esoteric sources in their work. In some of their songs, a male and a female voice can be heard speaking at certain points. These are the voices of Ken and Winnie from the 1950 film This Charming Couple. On the song "Lolita's Medicine" on the album Incorporated, the male voice is from a 1967 anti-drug PSA called Narcotics: Pit of Despair.

== Discography ==
=== Albums ===
Year	Title	Label	Release date
2007	Incorporated	Illegal Art	March 6, 2007
2009	The Legion of Doom vs Triune	Antagonist Records	September 1, 2009

=== Compilation appearances ===
Year	Song	Album	Artist Remixed
2005	"Suspicious Minds"	Las Vegas Soundtrack	Wayne Newton
2005	"Home Invasion Robbery"	Saw II Soundtrack	None
2006	"Where Do I Stab Myself in the Ears (The Legion of Doom Remix)"	Underworld: Evolution	Hawthorne Heights
2006	"Bite to Break Skin (The Legion of Doom Remix)"	Underworld: Evolution	Senses Fail
2006	"Eyes of the Insane (The Legion of Doom vs Slayer)"	Saw III Soundtrack	Slayer
2007	"I'm So Sick (T-Virus Remix)"	Resident Evil: Extinction	Flyleaf
2007	"One Love (Extinction Remix)"	Resident Evil: Extinction	Aiden
2009	"Broken Lungs (Legion of Doom Remix)"	Underworld: Rise of the Lycans	Thrice
2011	"Hero (The Legion of Doom Remix)"	Awake and Remixed EP	Skillet

=== Other songs ===
Title	Song #1	Song #2
"Good News, I'm Dead"	Original Track	Original Track
"Crazy as She Goes"	"Crazy" by Gnarls Barkley	"Steady, As She Goes" by the Raconteurs
"Supersighs Mix (The Legion of Doom vs Goblin)"	"Sighs" by Goblin	
"Kill Jenny Like That"	"Jenny Was a Friend of Mine" by the Killers	"Back Like That" by Ghostface Killah
"Cross Your Love Triangle"	"Cross Your Heart and Hope to Die" by Trever Keith	"Bizarre Love Triangle" by New Order
"Muevete"	"Muevete" by Ceci Bastida	"What Difference Does It Make?" by the Smiths
"The Quiet Screaming"	"Screaming Infidelities" by Dashboard Confessional	"The Quiet Things That No One Ever Knows" by Brand New
