= Protection (Face to Face album) =

Studio album by Face to Face
- Released: March 4, 2016
- Genre: Punk rock
- Length: 34:09
- Label: Fat Wreck Chords
- Producer: Bill Stevenson & Jason Livermore

Face to Face chronology
Three Chords and a Half Truth (2013)	Protection (2016)	Hold Fast: Acoustic Sessions (2018)

Professional ratings
Review scores
Source	Rating
AllMusic	4.5/5 stars

Protection is the tenth studio album by American punk rock band Face to Face, released on March 4, 2016, through Fat Wreck Chords. It was issued with the catalog number FAT954 on multiple formats including compact disc, vinyl and digital download. This was the first release for the band on Fat Wreck Chords in over 20 years, and the first one with guitarist Dennis Hill as the replacement of Chad Yaro.

The album was recorded at The Blasting Room in Fort Collins, Colorado and produced by Bill Stevenson and Jason Livermore.

== Track listing ==
1. "Bent But Not Broken" – 2:30
2. "I Won't Say I'm Sorry" – 3:27
3. "Double Crossed" – 2:49
4. "See If I Care" – 3:25
5. "Say What You Want" – 2:52
6. "Protection" – 2:57
7. "Fourteen Fifty-Nine" – 2:59
8. "It Almost All Went Wrong" – 2:57
9. "Keep Your Chin Up" – 3:35
10. "Middling Around" – 3:00
11. "And So It Goes" – 3:38

== Personnel ==
- Trever Keith - lead vocals, guitar
- Scott Shiflett - bass, backing vocals
- Dennis Hill - guitar, backing vocals
- Danny Thompson - drums, backing vocals

Additional personnel

- Bill Stevenson - producer, engineer
- Jason Livermore - producer, engineer, mixer
- Andrew Berlin - engineer, additional production
- Chris Beeble- engineer
- Joe Gastwirt - mastering
