= Ignorance Is Bliss (Face to Face album) =

Studio album by Face to Face
- Released: July 27, 1999
- Genre: Alternative rock
- Length: 52:34
- Label: Beyond Music
- Producer: Trever Keith, Scott Shiflett, Chad Blinman

Face to Face chronology
Standards & Practices (1999)	Ignorance Is Bliss (1999)	Reactionary (2000)

Singles from Ignorance Is Bliss
- 1. "The Devil You Know (God Is a Man)" Released: 1999

Professional ratings
Review scores
Source	Rating
AllMusic	4/5 stars

Ignorance Is Bliss is the fifth studio album by the punk rock band Face to Face. The album was released in 1999, and was a musical and lyrical departure from the pop punk or skate punk influenced music found on previous albums and EPs.

Though an 'EconoLive 2' tour was done in promotion of the album, the band does not currently play any of the songs from the album while touring. Trever Keith flatly refused to play anything from this album on their minitour, according to an interview video on their official MySpace page. In 2012, the band had a change of heart and decided to go on tour and perform the entire album acoustically. This album's song "The Devil You Know (God Is a Man)" is featured in the Buffy the Vampire Slayer first soundtrack album.

The album was reissued in 2012 on Keith's own label, Antagonist Records, with the songs from So Why Aren't You Happy? EP as bonus tracks.

Reception was mainly positive and many noted the shift in style from skate punk to more alternative rock sound.

== Track listing ==
All tracks by Trever Keith and Scott Shiflett except where noted.

1. "Overcome" (Keith, Shiflett, Chad Yaro) – 3:16
2. "In Harm's Way" – 4:24
3. "Burden" – 4:17
4. "Everyone Hates a Know-It-All" (Keith) – 3:07
5. "Heart of Hearts" – 4:00
6. "Prodigal" – 5:13
7. "Nearly Impossible" – 5:20
8. "I Know What You Are" – 4:10
9. "The Devil You Know (God Is a Man)" – 3:38
10. "(A)Pathetic" (Keith, Shiflett, Yaro) – 3:13
11. "Lost" (Keith) – 4:14
12. "Run in Circles" – 3:50
13. "Maybe Next Time" (Keith, Pete Parada) – 3:52

=== So Why Aren't You Happy? EP ===
1. "Bottle Rockets" - 3:13
2. "So Long" - 4:04
3. "Questions Still Remain" - 3:52
4. "Everyone Hates a Know-It-All (acoustic)" - 2:57

== Personnel ==
- Trever Keith – guitar, vocals, producer
- Chad Yaro – guitar, vocals
- Scott Shiflett – bass guitar, background vocals, producer
- Pete Parada – drums

Additional personnel

- Chad Blinman – producer, engineer, mixing
- Ramon Breton – mastering
- Steve Croes – conductor, string arrangements
- Dale Lawton – mixing assistant

== Charts ==
Album - Billboard (North America)

Year	Chart	Position
1999	Heatseekers	7
1999	Billboard 200	162
