= Three Chords and a Half Truth =

Studio album by Face to Face
- Released: April 9, 2013
- Recorded: December 2012–January 2013
- Genre: Punk rock; pop-punk
- Length: 39:44
- Label: Antagonist Records, Rise
- Producer: Trever Keith, Scott Shiflett

Face to Face chronology
Laugh Now, Laugh Later (2011)	Three Chords and a Half Truth (2013)	Protection (2016)

Professional ratings
Review scores
Source	Rating
AllMusic	3/5 stars

Three Chords and a Half Truth is the ninth studio album by American punk rock band Face to Face, released on April 9, 2013, through Trevor Keith's Antagonist Records, under exclusive license to Rise Records, their first album for Rise. This is the last Face to Face album to feature guitarist Chad Yaro.

The album's first single, "Right as Rain", was released on March 5, 2013. The single marked a change in style for Face to Face, a departure from their fast punk rock sound, into a more mid-tempo, layered classic punk sound. The album has been compared to those of Social Distortion, The Clash, and John Mellencamp.

== Track listing ==
All songs written and composed by Trever Keith and Scott Shiflett, except "Right As Rain" written by Keith.

1. "123 Drop" – 3:12
2. "Welcome Back To Nothing" – 2:52
3. "Smokestacks and Skyscrapers" – 3:08
4. "Right As Rain" – 3:26
5. "First Step, Misstep" – 3:45
6. "Bright Lights Go Down" – 3:08
7. "Paper Tigers with Teeth" – 3:46
8. "Flat Black" – 3:00
9. "Jinxproof" – 3:03
10. "Marked Men" – 3:24
11. "Three Chords and a Half Truth" – 2:24
12. "Across State Lines" - 4:37
13. "Hardcase" (Amazon MP3 bonus track) – 2:47

== Personnel ==
- Trever Keith – vocals, guitar
- Chad Yaro – guitar, background vocals
- Scott Shiflett – bass, background vocals
- Danny Thompson – drums, background vocals

=== Additional musicians ===
- Dennis Hill – guitar, background vocals
- Jason Freese – Hammond B3, tenor saxophone
- Charles Keith – piano
