= From Satellite =

American alternative rock band

From Satellite is an alternative rock band from Ventura, California. They have gained most of their recognition from touring with Hoobastank and Alien Ant Farm. Also, some of their music was featured in the soundtrack for the video game ESPN NHL 2K5.

== Members ==
- Ian McDonnell - vocals
- Armand Tambouris - guitar
- Ryan Cleary - guitar
- Justin Huth - bass
- Pat Pedraza - drums

== Albums ==
- When All Is Said and Done (2004)
