= Laugh Now, Laugh Later =

Studio album by Face to Face
- Released: May 17, 2011
- Recorded: 2010
- Genre: Punk rock
- Length: 36:01
- Label: Antagonist / People Like You Records

Face to Face chronology
Shoot the Moon: The Essential Collection (2005)	Laugh Now, Laugh Later (2011)	Three Chords and a Half Truth (2013)

Laugh Now, Laugh Later is the eighth studio album by American punk rock band Face to Face, which was released on May 17, 2011, through Antagonist Records, a label run by the band's lead singer and guitarist Trever Keith. It marks 9 years since the release of Face to Face's previous studio album How to Ruin Everything in 2002. It is their first release with second guitarist Chad Yaro in 11 years, since 2000's Reactionary.

== Artwork influence ==
As seen on the October 13, 2010 episode of LA Ink, tattoo artist Corey Miller produced imagery for one of the singles from the album titled "Should Anything Go Wrong". This can be seen on Trever Keith's back in the form of a tattoo.

== Reception ==
Professional ratings
Aggregate scores
Source	Rating
Metacritic	67/100
Review scores
Source	Rating
The A.V. Club	B−
The Boston Phoenix	2/4 stars
Consequence of Sound	C+
Punknews.org	4/5 stars

Laugh Now, Laugh Later received positive reviews from critics. On Metacritic, the album holds a score of 67/100 based on 4 reviews, indicating "generally favorable reviews".

== Track listing ==
1. "Should Anything Go Wrong" – 3:05
2. "It's Not All About You" – 3:02
3. "The Invisible Hand" – 3:04
4. "Bombs Away" – 3:00
5. "Blood in the Water" – 3:43
6. "What You Came For" – 3:13
7. "I Don't Mind and You Don't Matter" – 3:42
8. "Stopgap" – 04:33
9. "All for Nothing" – 3:07
10. "Pushover" – 2:28
11. "Under the Wreckage" – 3:03
12. "Staring Back" (Physical Bonus Track)
13. "Persona Non Grata" (Physical Bonus Track)
14. "Get Up" (bonus track)

== Personnel ==
- Trever Keith - vocals, guitar
- Chad Yaro - guitar, vocals
- Scott Shiflett - bass, vocals
- Danny Thompson - drums
- Dennis Hill - guitar
