= Over It (EP) =

EP by Face to Face
- Released: October 18, 1994
- Genre: Skate punk
- Length: 20:17
- Label: Victory Music
- Producer: Face to Face/Geza X

Face to Face chronology
Don't Turn Away (1992)	Over It (1994)	Big Choice (1995)

Professional ratings
Review scores
Source	Rating
Allmusic	3/5 stars

Over It is an EP by American punk rock band Face to Face, released in 1994 on Victory Music, a subsidiary of a major label, not the similarly named Chicago-based Victory Records. It contains remixes of songs released on 1992's Don't Turn Away as well as original material. The EP also features the first appearance of Chad Yaro on accompanying rhythm guitar, thus 'filling out' the sound, according to front man Trever Keith. By request of the band, the EP is no longer in print.

== Track listing ==
No.	Title	Lyrics	Music	Length
1.	"I Want"	Trever Keith	Keith, Matt Riddle	3:06
2.	"Nothing New"	Keith	Keith, Riddle	3:22
3.	"Disconnected"	Keith	Keith, Riddle	3:25
4.	"A.O.K."	Keith	Keith, Riddle	2:59
5.	"I Used to Think"	Keith	Keith, Riddle	3:04
6.	"Don't Turn Away"	Keith	Keith, Riddle	2:47
7.	"Not Enough"	Keith	Keith, Riddle	2:54
Total length:				20:17
