= Face to Face (1996 Face to Face album) =

Studio album by Face to Face
- Released: September 9, 1996
- Recorded: Spring 1996
- Genre: Skate punk
- Length: 38:28
- Label: A&M
- Producer: Face to Face; Jim Goodwin

Face to Face chronology
Big Choice (1995)	Face to Face (1996)	Live (1998)

Singles from Face to Face
- 1. "I Won’t Lie Down" Released: August 10, 1996; 2. "Ordinary" Released: 1996; 3. "Blind" Released: 1998

Professional ratings
Review scores
Source	Rating
Allmusic	4.5/5 stars

Face to Face is the 1996 third studio album by the California punk band Face to Face.

== Track listing ==
All songs written by Trever Keith, except where noted.

1. "Resignation" - 3:48
2. "Walk the Walk" (Keith, Scott Shiflett) - 3:35
3. "Blind" - 2:43
4. "Ordinary" - 2:48
5. "I Won't Lie Down" (Keith, Shiflett) - 3:17
6. "Can't Change the World" - 2:13
7. "Handout" (Keith, Shiflett) - 3:37
8. "Everything's Your Fault" - 2:49
9. "Take It Back" - 2:59
10. "Complicated" (Keith, Chad Yaro) - 4:02
11. "Put You in Your Place" - 3:42
12. "Falling" - 3:01

== Personnel ==
- Trever Keith – vocals, guitar
- Chad Yaro – guitar, vocals
- Scott Shiflett – bass, vocals
- Rob Kurth – drums, vocals

== Miscellaneous ==
The track "I Won't Lie Down" was covered by Christian rock band Spoken on their album Echoes of the Spirit Still Dwell, and Israeli punk band Man Alive on their 2007 EP Access Denied! A remixed version of "I Won't Lie Down" was also a part of the soundtrack for the movie Mortal Kombat Annihilation. "Blind" was covered by American punk rock band Rise Against on the album Long Forgotten Songs: B-Sides & Covers 2000–2013.
