= Big Choice =

Studio album by Face to Face
- Released: February 28, 1995
- Recorded: 1994
- Genre: Skate punk
- Length: 40:14
- Label: Original: Victory Music; Re-release: A&M
- Producer: Face to Face; Thom Wilson

Face to Face chronology
Over It (1994)	Big Choice (1995)	Face to Face (1996)

Singles from Big Choice
- 1. "Disconnected" Released: January 20, 1995; 2. "A-OK" Released: 1995; 3. "Debt" Released: August 15, 1995

Professional ratings
Review scores
Source	Rating
AllMusic	3/5 stars

Big Choice is a full-length album by the California punk band Face to Face, released in 1995. It was released on Victory Music in 1995, and then re-released on A&M Records. "Disconnected" was released to alternative radio on January 20, 1995. "Debt" was released as a single on August 15, 1995.

== Critical reception ==
The Los Angeles Times wrote that singer "[Trever] Keith dwells on his inner struggles in self-questioning songs that focus on the gap between idealistic aspirations and flawed, frustrating realities."

== Track listing ==
All songs written by Trever Keith and Matt Riddle unless otherwise noted.

1. "Struggle" – 3:07
2. "I Know You Well" – 2:42
3. "Sensible" – 2:58
4. "A-OK" – 2:57
5. "You Lied" – 3:27
6. "Promises" – 3:15
7. "Big Choice" – 3:24
8. "It's Not Over" – 2:26
9. "Velocity" – 3:17
10. "Debt" – 2:19
11. "Late" – 3:37
12. (blank) * – 1:16
13. "Disconnected" * – 3:20
14. "Bikeage" * (cover of Descendents) – 2:09

The '*' marks indicate that it's a bonus track. Those songs were featured on the 1995 re-release as bonus tracks. The original pressing had just the first eleven tracks. The twelfth track is sometimes referred to as "Untitled" or "Song 12", but is actually titled as blank. The track features a conversation about re-recording "Disconnected", which originally appeared on their first album Don't Turn Away and would be the following track on this album, because no one could "hear a single" until KROQ-FM first played it. However, the track is not featured on the track listing from the back cover of the album. Rock poster artist Jim Evans (T.A.Z.), worked closely with the band to create the unique album art featuring the "Big Choice" game machine.

== Personnel ==
- Trever Keith – guitar, vocals
- Chad Yaro – guitar, backing vocals
- Matt Riddle – bass, backing vocals
- Rob Kurth – drums, backing vocals

Additional personnel

- Face To Face – producer
- Thom Wilson – producer, engineer
- Mike Ainsworth – assistant engineer
- Eddy Schreyer – mastering
- Mark McKenna – photography

== Charts ==
Chart (1995)	Peak position
Billboard Heatseekers	23
