= Standards & Practices (album) =

Studio album by Face to Face
- Released: June 29, 1999
- Genre: Punk rock
- Length: 31:42
- Label: Vagrant
- Producer: Face to Face

Face to Face chronology
Live (1998)	Standards & Practices (1999)	Ignorance Is Bliss (1999)

Professional ratings
Review scores
Source	Rating
AllMusic	4/5 stars
Ox-Fanzine	Favorable

Standards and Practices is the fourth studio album by the American punk rock band Face to Face. It was a cover album that released in 1999 under the label Lady Luck, Face to Face's imprint through Vagrant Records. It was re-released two years later on February 20, 2001, on Vagrant Records. It contains a mixture of rock, punk rock, and new wave cover tracks.

== Track listing ==
No.	Title	Original artist	Length
1.	"What Difference Does It Make?"	The Smiths	3:42
2.	"Chesterfield King"	Jawbreaker	3:47
3.	"Don't Change"	INXS	4:07
4.	"Sunny Side of the Street"	The Pogues	2:43
5.	"Planet of Sound"	Pixies	2:06
6.	"The KKK Took My Baby Away"	Ramones	2:31
7.	"Heaven"	The Psychedelic Furs	3:24
8.	"Merchandise"	Fugazi	2:59
9.	"Helpless"	Sugar	2:54
10.	"That's Entertainment"	The Jam	3:12

Japanese import bonus tracks
No.	Title	Original artist	Length
11.	"Planet Earth"	Duran Duran	3:48
12.	"In a Big Country"	Big Country	3:51

== Personnel ==
- Face to Face – main performer, producer
- Trever Keith – vocals, guitar
- Chad Yaro – guitar, backing vocals
- Scott Shiflett – bass guitar, backing vocals
- Pete Parada – drums

Additional personnel

- Chad Blinman – mixing and recording
- Ramon Breton – mastering
