= How to Ruin Everything =

Studio album by Face to Face
- Released: April 9, 2002
- Recorded: August–September 2001
- Studio: Audio International
- Genre: Punk rock
- Length: 46:00
- Label: Vagrant
- Producers: Trever Keith, Scott Shiflett, Chad Blinman

Face to Face chronology
Reactionary (2000)	How to Ruin Everything (2002)	Shoot the Moon: Essential Collection (2005)

Singles from How to Ruin Everything
- 1. "The New Way" Released: 2002

How to Ruin Everything is the seventh studio album by the punk rock band Face to Face, released in 2002 (see 2002 in music).

As of the release date, How to Ruin Everything was Face to Face's only album since their 1992 debut Don't Turn Away without Chad Yaro on guitar. The band remained as a three-piece, marking the first time in over a decade that Face to Face had recorded and played live as a trio.

== Background and production ==
Guitarist Chad Yaro left the band in 2000; frontman Trevor Keith said Yaro had spent a few years between focusing on the band, and his committing to his family.

Sessions for How to Ruin Everything were held at Audio International in Ojai, California produced by Keith, Scott Shiflett, and Chad Blinman, who also handled recording. The band reportedly recorded 22 songs for the album. Blinman mixed the recordings at Westbeach Recorders in Hollywood, California, with assistant engineer Chris Gresham/ Ramon Breton mastered the album at Oceanview Mastering in Los Angeles, California.

== Composition ==
Musically, the sound of How to Ruin Everything has been described as arena rock, and punk rock. Keith said the band wrote the album as a three-piece, and were aware of the limitations of arranging music as a trio. "A Wolf in Sheep's Clothing" is about self-criticism. "Why Would I Lie?" is a rock song, and is followed "The New Way", which comes across as a mix of the Offspring and Nirvana.

== Release ==
In March 2002, the band supported Alkaline Trio on their UK headlining tour. On March 29, the band appeared on Last Call with Carson Daly. How to Ruin Everything was released in April 2002. The Japanese edition, released by Victor, featured "Nothing Succeeds Like Success" and "Anybody Listening?" as bonus tracks. In April and May, the band embarked on a headlining US tour, with support from Thrice, Thursday, and Midtown. In August, the band appeared at Bizarre Festival in Germany. On May 10, the band appeared on The Late Late Show. In October and November, the band played a handful of shows with Brand New, and appeared on Boom Boom Huck Jam tour and at Smoke Out Festival. From June to August 2003, the group went on the 2003 edition of Warped Tour. In November 2003, the band announced they were breaking up. They played a farewell US tour in August and September 2004.

== Reception ==
Professional ratings
Review scores
Source	Rating
AllMusic	4/5 stars
Chart Attack	Favorable
CMJ New Music Report	Favorable
Ox-Fanzine	Favorable
Punknews.org	2.5/5 stars
Sputnikmusic	3.5/5

How to Ruin Everything was met with generally favorable reviews from music critics. AllMusic reviewer MacKenzie Wilson wrote that the album "emerges as Face to Face's strongest material to date." He noted that the band avoided "current punk-pop sounds for a gnarling rock growl." Chart Attack writer Keith Carman found the album to be a return-to-form, full of "an impressive set of songs that blend pop melodies with a Rocket from the Crypt flare for arranging and songwriting and Straight Faced aggression". Christopher Ward of CMJ New Music Report also acknowledged the album's return-to-form status. adding that it "delivers what all punk fans have been yearning for: the good old-fashioned punk rock."

Ox-Fanzine's Joachim Hiller wrote that the band "have remained consistent", with the album's 15 songs "just run through and down and in and are a lot of fun." In a retrospective review, Sputnikmusic emeritus 204409 called the album "a perfect swan song for a band that stayed pretty uniformly great through all the crests and troughs of their career." He added that while it wasn't the band's best album, it acted as "more than satisfying end to a great career." Punknews.org staff member Scott Heisel viewed the album as "nothing more than boring, boring SoCal punk. [...] I'm baffled on how people could be inspired by music this mediocre."

== Track listing ==
All music by Face to Face, all lyrics by Trever Keith.

1. "Bill of Goods" – 2:46
2. "The Take-Away" – 2:47
3. "14 Hours" – 2:20
4. "A Wolf in Sheep's Clothing" – 3:06
5. "The New Way" – 3:35
6. "The World in Front of You" – 2:44
7. "Why Would I Lie?" – 2:46
8. "Unconditional" – 3:13
9. "Shoot the Moon" – 3:20
10. "Graded on a Curve" – 3:43
11. "Fight or Flight" – 3:06
12. "Waiting to Be Saved" – 3:18
13. "Double Standard" – 2:42
14. "The Compromise" – 3:31
15. "How to Ruin Everything" – 3:04

== Personnel ==
Credits adapted from liner notes.

Face to Face

- Trever Keith – vocals, guitar
- Scott Shiflett – bass, background vocals
- Pete Parada – drums

Production and design

- Trever Keith – producer
- Scott Shiflett – producer
- Chad Blinman – producer, mixing, recording
- Chris Gresham – assistant engineer
- Ramon Breton – mastering
- Kalynn Campbell – art direction, illustration
- Joby J. Ford – photography

== Charts ==
Chart performance
Chart (2002)	Peak position
US Billboard 200	178
US Heatseekers Albums (Billboard)	12
US Independent Albums (Billboard)	13
