= Don't Turn Away =

Studio album by Face to Face
- Released: 1992
- Recorded: October 1991 at Westbeach Recorders, Hollywood, California, except track 3, 4, 9 and 10 in August 1992 at Anarchy Studios in Los Angeles, California
- Genre: Punk rock; skate punk
- Length: 37:00
- Label: Dr. Strange, Fat Wreck Chords
- Producer: Face to Face

Face to Face chronology
Don't Turn Away (1992)	Over It (1994)

Singles from Don’t Turn Away
- 1. "No Authority" Released: 1992; 2. "Disconnected" Released: August 26, 1993

Professional ratings
Review scores
Source	Rating
AllMusic	4/5 stars
The Encyclopedia of Popular Music	4/5 stars

Don't Turn Away is the first album by the American punk rock band Face to Face. It was released in 1992 under the label Dr. Strange Records, and was considered a strong debut for the band. It was re-released a year later on Fat Wreck Chords.

Two years later, "Disconnected," the album's third track, was re-recorded for the band's second album Big Choice. Their then-label A&M Records wanted the band to re-record it, because no one could "hear a single" until the L.A. radio station KROQ first played it.

== Critical reception ==
Trouser Press called the album "a stirring and exciting debut undercut only slightly by its overt stylistic debt to Hüsker Dü and Social Distortion."

== Track listing ==
All songs by Keith, Riddle

1. "You've Done Nothing" – 1:59
2. "I'm Not Afraid" – 2:44
3. "Disconnected" – 3:27
4. "No Authority" – 2:42
5. "I Want" – 3:00
6. "You've Got a Problem" – 2:47
7. "Everything Is Everything" – 3:08
8. "I'm Trying" – 2:52
9. "Pastel" – 3:13
10. "Nothing New" – 3:26
11. "Walk Away" – 2:09
12. "Do You Care?" – 3:01
13. "1,000 X" – 2:32

=== Fat Wreck Chords bonus tracks (2016) ===
14. "Who You Are" – 1:56
15. "Don’t Turn Away" – 2:47

== Personnel ==
- Face To Face - producer
- Trever Keith - guitar, vocals
- Matt Riddle - bass, Backup vocals
- Rob Kurth - drums

=== Technical personnel ===
- Jim Goodwin - engineer
- Donnell Cameron - engineer
- John Golden - mastering
- Mike Brooling - sequencing

== Charts ==
Singles - Billboard (United States)

Year	Single	Chart	Position
1995	"Disconnected"	Modern Rock Tracks	39
