= Reactionary (album) =

Studio album by Face to Face
- Released: June 6, 2000
- Recorded: January 2000
- Genre: Hardcore punk
- Length: 37:07
- Label: Vagrant
- Producer: Trever Keith, Scott Shiflett, Chad Blinman

Face to Face chronology
Ignorance Is Bliss (1999)	Reactionary (2000)	How to Ruin Everything (2002)

Singles from Reactionary
- 1. "Disappointed" Released: 2000

Professional ratings
Review scores
Source	Rating
AllMusic	2.5/5 stars
Ox-Fanzine	Favorable

Reactionary is the sixth studio album by the band Face to Face. Released in 2000, it was recorded in January 2000. The band ran a promotion with MP3.com where fans could decide which songs ended up on the final version of the album. This was their last release with second guitarist Chad Yaro until Laugh Now, Laugh Later in 2011.

== Release ==
Reactionary was released in June 2000. The band played shows with Saves the Day, Alkaline Trio, and New Found Glory between late August and early October. In January and February 2001, the band toured the US with H_{2}O and Snapcase. In October 2001, guitarist Chad Yaro had reportedly left the band.

== Track listing ==
All songs by Keith/Shiflett except where noted.

1. "Disappointed" – 2:48
2. "Out of Focus" – 3:32
3. "What's in a Name" – 3:05
4. "You Could've Had Everything" (Keith) – 2:15
5. "Hollow" – 3:23
6. "Think for Yourself" (Keith) – 2:43
7. "Just Like You Said" – 3:06
8. "Solitaire" – 3:05
9. "Best Defense" (Keith, Parada) – 3:47
10. "Icons" – 3:18
11. "Shame on Me" – 3:13
12. "Estranged" (Keith) – 2:52
13. "Nullification" (Japanese Bonus Track)
14. "Talk Talk" (Japanese Bonus Track)

== Personnel ==
- Trever Keith – guitar, vocals, producer
- Chad Yaro – guitar, background vocals
- Scott Shiflett – bass guitar, background vocals, producer
- Pete Parada – drums

=== Additional personnel ===
- Chad Blinman – producer, engineer, mixing
- Dale Lawton – assistant engineer
- Ramon Breton – mastering
- Chapman Baehler – photography
- Scott Ritcher – design

== Charts ==
Chart (2000)	Peak position
US Heatseekers Albums (Billboard)	16
