= Face to Face (punk band) =

American punk rock band formed in 1991

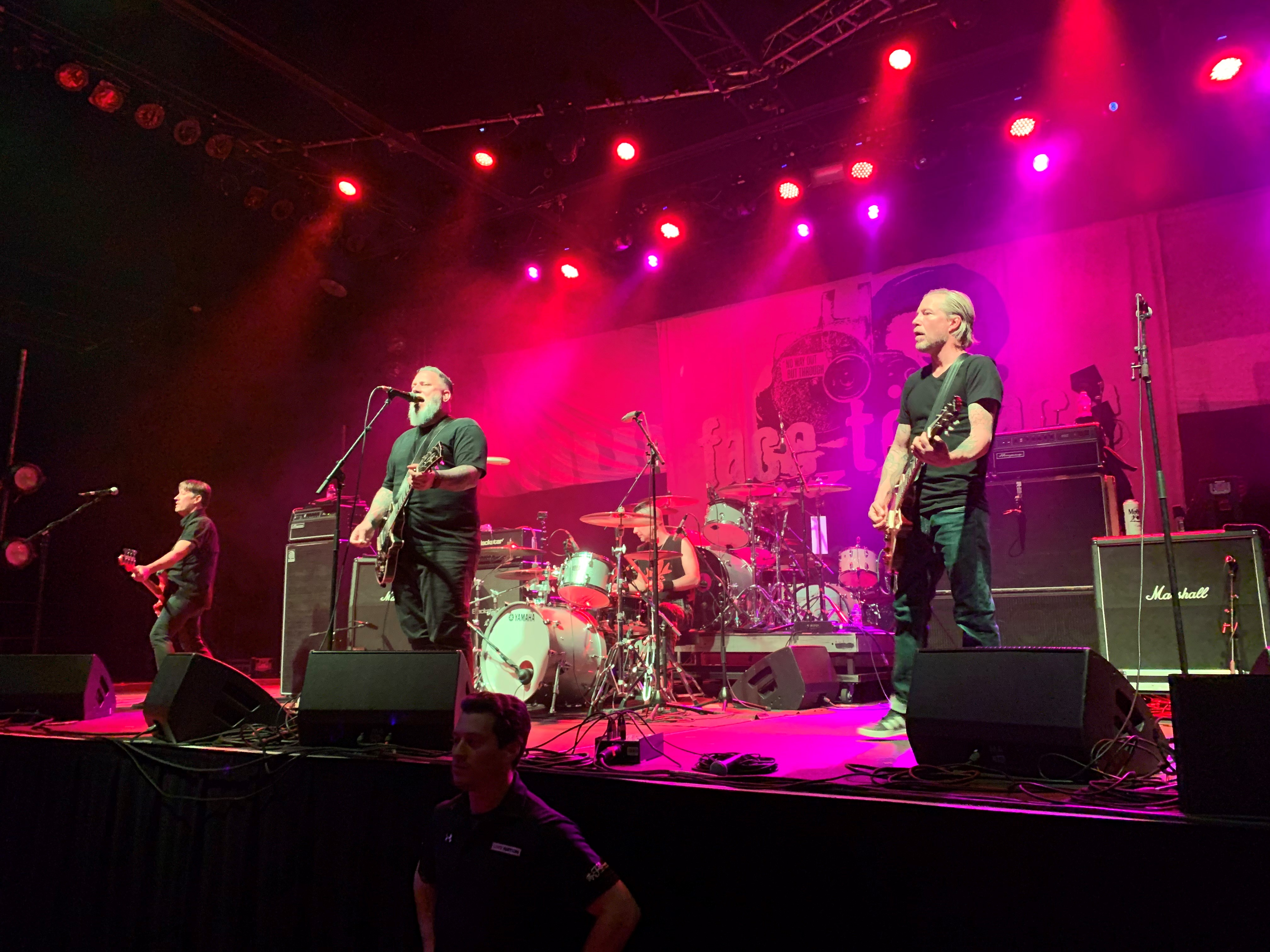
- Face to Face performing at the Fillmore Auditorium in Denver, 2022 Left to right: Shiflett, Keith, ex-drummer Parada (behind drum kit), and Hill.

Background information
- Origin: Victorville, California, United States
- Genres: Punk rock, skate punk, pop-punk
- Works: Discography
- Years active: 1991–2004, 2008–present
- Labels: Dr. Strange; Victory Music; Vagrant; A&M; Antagonist Records; Fat Wreck Chords; Rise
- Members: Trever Keith; Dennis Hill; Scott Shiflett; Danny Thompson
- Past members: Rob Kurth; Matt Riddle; Mark Haake; Pete Parada; Chad Yaro
- Website: facetofacemusic.com

Face to Face is a punk rock band from Victorville, California, formed in 1991 by frontman Trever Keith, bassist Matt Riddle and drummer Rob Kurth. The band rose to fame with their 1995 album Big Choice, featuring the radio hit "Disconnected" which received heavy rotation on KROQ radio in Los Angeles and appeared in the movies Tank Girl and National Lampoon's Senior Trip.

Face to Face officially split up in September 2004, allowing the band members time to focus on other recordings. During that time, the band members played in a number of projects including Legion of Doom, Me First and the Gimme Gimmes, the Offspring, and Saves the Day. In April 2008, after a four-year hiatus, Face to Face performed together for the first time at The Glasshouse in Pomona, California. The band has released five more albums.

== History ==
=== Beginnings (1987–1992) ===
Face to Face began in 1987 when Trever Keith (vocals, synthesizers) and Matt Riddle (bass, background vocals), who had been friends since high school formed a heavy metal band, Victoria Manor which featured Todd "Rick" Atmire on guitars and Matt Atmire on drums. Victor Manor never released any albums other than a demo tape in 1989. After they disbanded, Keith and Riddle formed a band named Zero Tolerance with drummer Rob Kurth and guitarist Mark Haake who were in the U.S. Air Force and stationed at George Air Force Base in Victorville, California. Like Victor Manor, Zero Tolerance never released a full-length album and they also recorded a demo tape (in 1990) with the aforementioned line-up. By 1991, the band changed their name to Face to Face going in a different direction musically. Shortly after that, guitarist Mark Haake left the band and the remaining members continued on as a three-piece.

The band continued to play frequently throughout the Inland Empire and Orange County quickly becoming a local favorite alongside the Offspring, Guttermouth, Voodoo Glow Skulls, and other bands. At a show in Montclair, California in May 1991, the band met Bill Plaster of Dr. Strange Records and was offered a record deal. After accepting Plaster's offer, Face to Face went to Westbeach Recorders studio in Hollywood, Los Angeles in October 1991 to record songs for their first album, Don't Turn Away (1992). Once the recording was finished, Dr. Strange Records had difficulty raising the financial resources to have the recordings pressed; the band met Jim Goodwin in the interim. Goodwin offered to record some of the band's songs for free so they recorded "Nothing New," "Pastel," and "Disconnected" in August 1992. The songs were included on Don't Turn Away along with the songs recorded at Westbeach Recorders.

=== Success (1993–1997) ===
In 1993, after a three-week tour in Germany supporting Lagwagon, Face to Face added Chad Yaro as an additional guitarist and also a manager, Desi Benjamin. They began writing material for a record. Before the band began recording, they signed a recording contract with a major label and publishing deal which Desi Benjamin secured for them with JVC/Victory/A&M Records and EMI Music Publishing. Then, Face to Face and producer Thom Wilson (of the Offspring fame) began recording an album which became Big Choice.

Victory Music decided they wanted to test their distribution system with a release. They assembled an EP of songs featured on several of the band's 7" records along with other unreleased recordings. The EP was titled Over It and was released several weeks before Big Choice. The EP contained a remixed version of the song "Disconnected". The song received significant airplay from KROQ in Los Angeles. This drove the label to push the band to re-record "Disconnected" for Big Choice. It was featured as a bonus track alongside a cover of the Descendents song "Bikeage".

After touring with bands including Sublime, NOFX, The Mighty Mighty Bosstones, and The Offspring in 1995 supporting Big Choice, bassist Matt Riddle chose to leave the band. Since then, Riddle has played in 22 Jacks, Pulley, No Use for a Name, Implants, and most recently Fire Sale. The band replaced him with a then-unknown bassist, Scott Shiflett. Shiflett's first show with the band was on December 2, 1995, at the Victorville Fairgrounds.

In 1996, Face to Face began writing and recording what became their third album; it is self-titled. That was the first record without Riddle, who had been Keith's songwriting partner. As a result, Keith wrote the majority of the songs on the album with some help from Shiflett and Yaro. In the studio, the band again recruited Goodwin to record and produce the record. They headlined the 1997 SnoCore Tour and joined the Warped Tour. Their song "I Won't Lie Down" was featured on soundtrack for the film, Mortal Kombat Annihilation (1997).

=== Later years (1998–2004) ===
In 1998, it was announced that drummer Rob Kurth was leaving the band. Face to Face hired drummer Jose Medeles for the rest of the tour. Pete Parada joined the band as Kurth's permanent replacement. With Parada playing the drums, the band recorded and released two more albums (with producer Chad Blinman), Ignorance Is Bliss (1999) and Reactionary (2000). After the release of Reactionary, long-time guitarist Yaro left the band to focus on his family. Face to Face decided to stay a three-piece and began writing material for their sixth studio album, How to Ruin Everything, which was released on Vagrant Records in 2002. Next, the band headlined Warped Tour. In the fall of 2003, the band began a temporary hiatus; however in 2003, they announced that their hiatus would be permanent. They gave their fans a proper farewell with "The Only Goodbye Tour" of 2004 with supporting acts My Chemical Romance and Seconds to Go, which concluded with a raucous Warped Tour finale in Boston.

=== Reunion and beyond (2008–present) ===
On January 29, 2008, Face to Face announced that the band would be reuniting for select shows in the U.S. and internationally with Chad Yaro returning to play guitar. Later in 2008, the band launched a short U.S. tour with former Uprising drummer Danny Thompson replacing Pete Parada, who had recently joined The Offspring. The lineup recorded Face to Face's first studio album in nine years, Laugh Now, Laugh Later (2011), and Three Chords and a Half Truth (2013). Both of the albums were released on Keith's label, Antagonist Records. After the release of Three Chords and a Half Truth, Yaro left Face to Face again and was replaced by Dennis Hill.

In September 2015, it was announced that the band had signed with Fat Wreck Chords and was headed to the Blasting Room in Fort Collins, Colorado to begin recording their ninth album. The album was released on March 4, 2016 and is titled Protection. In August 2018 the band released an acoustic record titled, Hold Fast. In December 2017, Face to Face released a visual history coffee table book, Face to Face: 25 Years of SoCal Punk, with author Aaron Tanner. In April 2020, Trever Keith said in an interview that another Face to Face album would be released. The album No Way out but through came out on September 10, 2021.

== Band members ==
=== Current members ===
- Trever Keith – lead vocals, guitar (1991–present)
- Scott Shiflett – bass, vocals (1995–present)
- Danny Thompson – drums (2008–present)
- Dennis Hill – guitar, vocals (2015–present)

=== Former members ===
- Matt Riddle – bass, vocals (1991–1995)
- Rob Kurth – drums, vocals (1991–1998)
- Chad Yaro – guitar, vocals (1994–2000, 2008–2014)
- Pete Parada – drums (1998–2004)

== Discography ==
Studio albums

- Don't Turn Away (1992)
- Big Choice (1995)
- Face to Face (1996)
- Standards and Practices (1999)
- Ignorance Is Bliss (1999)
- Reactionary (2000)
- How to Ruin Everything (2002)
- Laugh Now, Laugh Later (2011)
- Three Chords and a Half Truth (2013)
- Protection (2016)
- Hold Fast: Acoustic Sessions (2018)
- No Way Out but Through (2021)
