= Live at the Jazz Cafe =

Live album by D'Angelo
- Released: June 30, 1998
- Recorded: September 14, 1995
- Venue: Jazz Café (London, England)
- Genre: R&B; neo soul; soul; funk
- Length: 43:10
- Label: EMI
- Producer: Various

D'Angelo chronology
Brown Sugar (1995)	Live at the Jazz Cafe (1998)	Voodoo (2000)

Professional ratings
Review scores
Source	Rating
Allmusic	4/5 stars

Live at the Jazz Cafe is a live album by American musician D'Angelo, released on June 30, 1998, on EMI Records. It was later released in Japan on December 7, 1999, with a bonus track. The live recordings are taken from D'Angelo's appearance at the Jazz Café in London, England, on September 14, 1995. The album was subsequently re-issued in 2014 with a recording of the complete show, including previously unreleased tracks.

== Track listing ==
1. "Me and Those Dreamin' Eyes of Mine" (D'Angelo) – 4:52
2. "Can't Hide Love" (Skip Scarborough) – 4:09
3. "Cruisin'" (Smokey Robinson, Marv Tarplin) – 6:34
4. "Shit, Damn, Motherfucker" (D'Angelo) – 5:37
5. "Lady" (D'Angelo, Raphael Saadiq) – 7:03
6. "Brown Sugar" (D'Angelo, Ali Shaheed Muhammad) – 10:41
7. "Heaven Must Be Like This" (Clarence "Satch" Satchell; James "Diamond" Williams; Leroy "Sugarfoot" Bonner; Marshall "Rock" Jones; Marvin Pierce; Ralph "Pee Wee" Middlebrooks; Ohio Players cover; Japan bonus track) – 4:12

=== 2014 Reissues: The Complete Show ===
1. "Introduction" – 0:47
2. "Fencewalk" – 1:48
3. "Sweet Sticky Thing" – 1:34
4. "Jonz in My Bones" – 3:55
5. "Me and Those Dreamin' Eyes of Mine" (D'Angelo) – 4:48
6. "Shit, Damn, Motherfucker" (D'Angelo) – 5:40
7. "Cruisin'" (Robinson, Taplin) – 6:38
8. "I'm Glad You're Mine" – 6:14
9. "Lady" (D'Angelo, Raphael Saadiq) – 8:59
10. "Announcement" – 0:39
11. "Can't Hide Love" (Skip Scarborough) – 4:06
12. "Brown Sugar" (D'Angelo, Ali Shaheed Muhammad) – 10:45

== Personnel ==
- D'Angelo – Main Performer / Rhodes
- Kedar Massenburg – Executive Producer
- Angie Stone – Vocals
- Jerry Brooks – Bass
- Norman "Keys" Hurt – Auxiliary keyboards / organ
- Abe Fogle – Drums
- Yoshitaka Aikawa – Director
- Mike "Dino" Campbell – Guitar
- Karen Bernod – Vocals
- Debbie Cole – Vocals

== Charts ==
Chart (2014)	Peak position
US Top R&B/Hip-Hop Albums (Billboard)	49
