= Anthony Gallo =

American guitarist (born 1965)

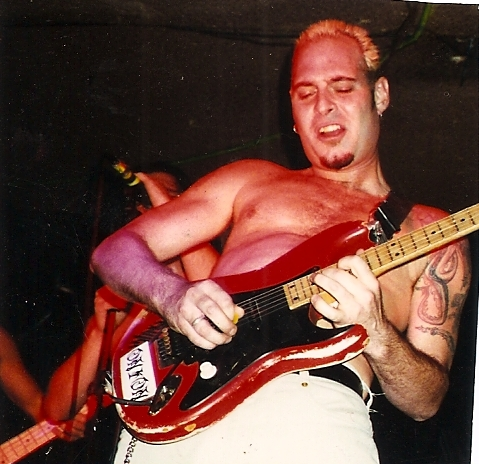
- Gallo in 1996

Background information
- Born: April 10, 1965 (age 61); Studio City, California, United States
- Genres: Hardcore punk, heavy metal, punk rock
- Occupations: Musician, actor
- Instrument: Guitar
- Years active: 1980–present

Anthony Gallo (born April 10, 1965) is an American guitarist who started at age 16 in the early 1980s punk scene. Gallo later progressed into heavy metal and rock as well as T.V. and Film. With a career spanning over 30 years Gallo played and recorded with New Regime, Los Cycos, Nick Menza (Megadeth), Mike Muir, Suicidal Tendencies/Los Cycos, SIN 34, Jon Nelson, Louiche Mayorga, Louis "Loud Lou" Hinzo (Würm), D.H. Peligro (Dead Kennedys), Tiny Bubz (T.S.O.L.), Phil Campbell (Motörhead), heavy metal act Cold Shot, guitarist Carlos Cavazo (Ratt, Quiet Riot), James Bradley Jr. (Crazy Town), Scott Weiland (STP/ Velvet Revolver), guitarist Christian Nesmith and Bullet Boys vocalist Marq Torien, and has appeared on Sons of Anarchy in Seasons 5 and 6 as a hang around, and Season 7, the final Ride episode 9, as an S.O.A. Indian Hills, Nevada, charter member.

== Early life ==
Born Robert Anthony Gallo on April 10, 1965, in Los Angeles. His father is Emil Frank Gallo, a financier, and his mother is actress Gigi Perreau. Gallo grew up in the Hollywood Hills and at age four moved north to Studio City in the San Fernando Valley. There he met local guitarist Steve Goertzen, who inspired him to learn the instrument and introduced him to such artists as Jeff Beck, Jimi Hendrix, Jimmy Page and Johnny Winter. When he was 13, Gallo took guitar lessons at Valley Arts Guitar with the aim of learning to read music. He attended Walter Reed Jr. High, where he met future New Regime bandmates, Todd Payden, Marc Woodson and Michael Brevetz.

== Career ==
=== New Regime ===
In 1981 Gallo joined his first band New Regime. The line up consisted of Todd Payden (vocals), Marc Woodson (drums) and Michael Brevetz (bass). In 1983 New Regime recorded two tracks for Mystic Records, "Be a Man Go to War" on (Party Animal 2) and "Night Stix" on the (Copulation Compilation). Both were produced by label owner Doug Moody. After those recordings, they were offered the opening slot for Suicidal Tendencies in Sacramento after a suggestion from Black Flag, Würm bassist Chuck Dukowski who caught one of their shows and thought they sounded a lot like them. Gallo and Mike Muir became fast friends and when Jon Nelson left Suicidal, Muir asked Gallo to help with guitar. "We just sat around Mike's house and jammed and wrote songs...one day I got a call from Mike and he asked if I wanted to play guitar in Los Cycos, a side project he was just starting."

=== Los Cycos ===
Los Cycos was originally Mike Muir (vocals), Bob Heathcote (bass), Anthony Gallo (guitars) and Amery Smith (drums). After a few rehearsals, drummer Smith left the line up, along with then Suicidal Tendencies guitarist Jon Nelson to start their own band (The Brood). Los Cycos eventually included: Grant Estes on lead guitar, Gallo went to (rhythm), and original choices Bob Heathcote and Amery Smith were replaced by Louiche Mayorga (bass) and No Mercy's Sal Troy (drums). "We initially rehearsed in Santa Monica at a little place on Lincoln Blvd., then when Bob and Amery left we moved to the basement of Louiche's house." With the final line up established and two songs "It's Not Easy" and "A Little Each Day" completed, Los Cycos were now ready for their recording debut on Suicidal Records. The Skate Punk compilation "Welcome to Venice" featured local Venice bands Suicidal Tendencies, Beowülf, Los Cycos, No Mercy and Excel, and was the first record released on the new label. Band politics and Muir's responsibilities with Suicidal prompted Gallo to leave the band before the release of "Welcome to Venice" his picture remained on the album's cover. Los Cycos disbanded that same year and in 1989 Suicidal Tendencies re-recorded "It's Not Easy" for their 1989 release Controlled by Hatred/Feel Like Shit...Déjà Vu album. The other Los Cycos track "A Little Each Day" was also included in the 1987 Suicidal Tendencies release "Join The Army" and again on "Still Cyco After All These Years" released in 93. In 2000 it resurfaced on the "FNG" compilation and a fourth time on the 2008 (Split) Album "Lights...Camera...Revolution!/Still Cyco After All These Years."

=== Cold Shot ===
In 1988 Gallo founded the heavy metal band "Cold Shot" recruiting singer/songwriter Adam Murray, bassist Erin Bartley, and drummer Rikki Baggett. The name "Cold Shot" (a suggestion by Murray) was not inspired from Stevie Ray Vaughan's song of the same name. Murray was working a construction job. His boss described his ex as "A real cold shot". Cold Shot played alongside such bands as the Bullet Boys, Bang Tango, Guns N' Roses and Motörhead. Cold Shot disbanded in 1994. In November 2012 Cold Shot signed a record deal with Eönian Records to release all their previously unreleased material.

=== Nick Menza ===
Eventually Gallo co-founded the band "Chodle's Trunk" with former Megadeth drummer Nick Menza and singer songwriter Gary "G-Voz" Flores. "All we got offered was a Japanese deal for like 10 grand and we thought WOW we spent more on recording it!" The recordings were shelved and in 1998 when Nick left Megadeth, they decided to record together. Recording for Menzas Life After Deth was done over a two-year period and was written and performed mostly by Menza. Guest guitarist included Gallo as well as Christian Nesmith (son of Mike Nesmith of The Monkees) for leads. Nick hired producer Max Norman (Ozzy Osbourne, Megadeth) to produce a few of the tracks. "It was a lot of fun to record and I was looking forward to the live shows"; however, the excitement was short-lived. Ty Longley, a guitarist whom they hired for the live shows, had left rehearsals for a few months to go on the road with the re-forming Great White. Longley perished in the Station nightclub fire in Rhode Island. A year later bass player Jason Levin suddenly died of a heart failure, and plans for the 2003 Tour were suspended indefinitely. Gallo and Menza are still writing and recording material together. in 2014 Gallo and Menza started a recording project with former Suicidal Tendencies members Jon Nelson and Louiche Mayorga for a metal compilation covering an early Brood song entitled "Going out in Style".

=== Slamnation ===
In August 2014 longtime friend and former Suicidal Tendencies guitarist Jon Nelson asked Gallo to help form a new punk band called Slamnation. A vehicle to record and perform some of his earlier works from the Suicidal days and some Brood songs to current. Other band members include Nicholas Gunnett on bass and Dead Kennedys D.H. Peligro drummer Santi Guardilla.

== Work in TV, film and video ==
In 1991 Gallo secured a two-song recording contract for an independent film entitled Across the Tracks. Collaborating with singer-songwriter Adam Murray, heavy metal guitarist Carlos Cavazo of (Quiet Riot) and brother (Bassist) Tony Cavazo of (Hurricane) for the song "Higher". The other title "Juicy Lucy" was written and performed by Cold Shot. On July 16 that same year he appeared in the video "Love All Humans" alongside model Tara Bre, musician / composer Gingger Shankar and actress Kate Kelton.

=== Sons of Anarchy ===
On July 11, 2012, Gallo was asked to play in a non-speaking role as "hang around" for season 5 and 6 on the hit motorcycle gang series Sons of Anarchy. in Season 7, the final Ride episode 5 he can be seen as a Teller-Morrow mechanic, and in episode 9 portraying an S.O.A. Indian Hills, Nevada, charter member as one of Jury's crew, who unexpectedly show up at SAMCRO's headquarters looking for an explanation about Jury's death. Jax tries hard to sell Jury as a rat, but Indian Hills isn't buying it.

== Musical equipment ==
Anthony Gallo plays mainly Strat-style guitars; he has four that he has built. One has an alder body and a Performance neck, including a Floyd Rose locking vibrato bridge with Seymour Duncan JB's in it. The other is an American Strat (replaced with a vintage-style fulcrum bridge) Performance neck and active EMG's. For acoustic guitars he uses a Baby Taylor and a vintage Martin. His amp set up is a modified Marshall JCM 800 series run through a series of modified effects and a Line 6 through four Marshall cabinets each with vintage 30 Watt Celestions and sometimes he uses 25 watt Celestion Greenbacks. He sometimes A-B's his clean channel with a standard Fender Twin reverb running through a Boss Chorus Ensemble CE-5 and a Boss DD-3 Digital Delay.

== Discography ==
Title	Release	Label	Band
Party Animal 2	1983	Mystic	New Regime
The COPulation Compilation	1983	Mystic	New Regime
Welcome to Venice	1984	Suicidal	Suicidal Tendencies/Los Cycos
Life After Deth	2002	Menzanator	Nick Menza
Abyss	2003	Independent	Dennis Lotka

== Photo gallery ==
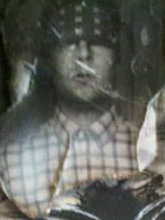
Photo for Welcome to Venice 1984

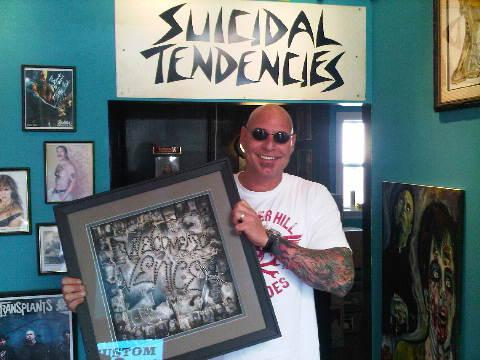
Gallo 2009

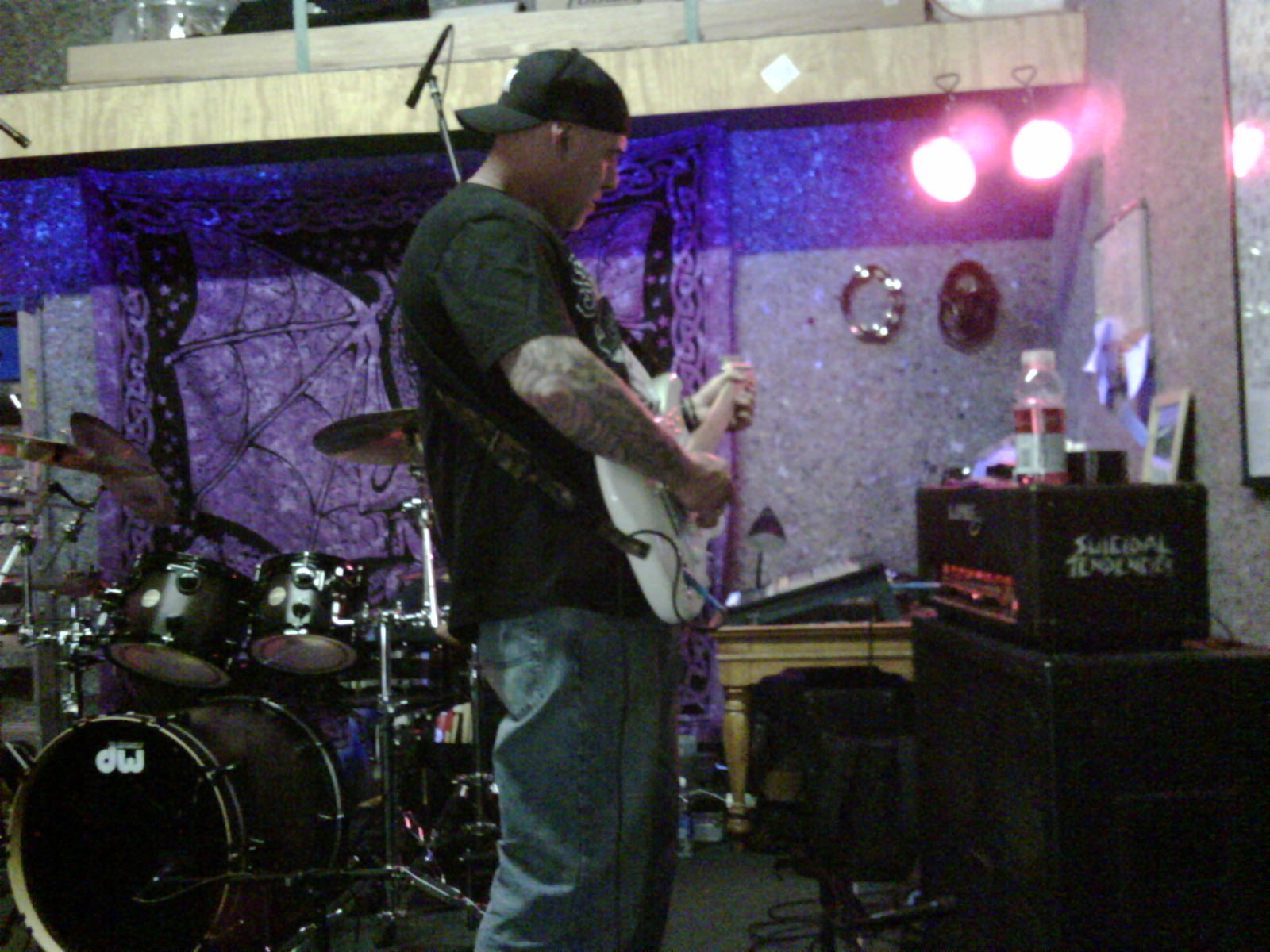
Gallo 2010

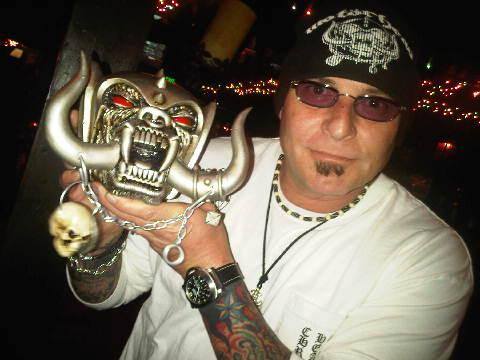
Gallo at Motorhead awards show 2011

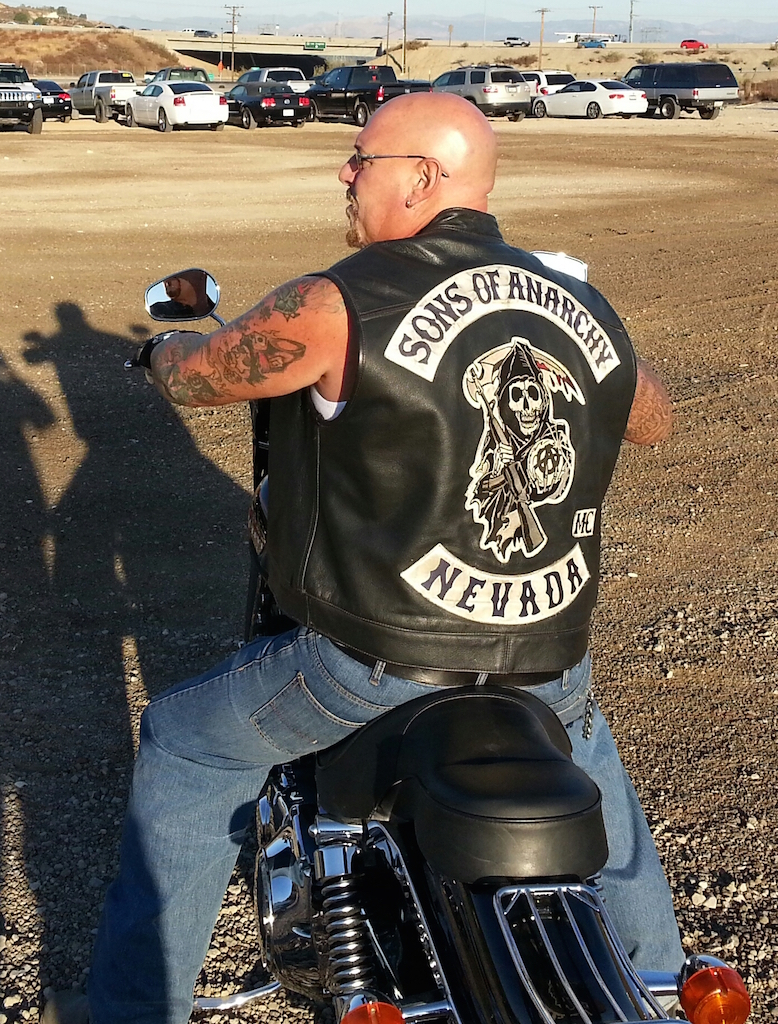
Gallo on location of SOA 2014
