= Westminster & 5th =

Studio album by Beowülf
- Released: March 13, 2007
- Recorded: 'The Bull Dog Den'- Eagle rock California
- Genres: Alternative metal Hardcore punk Crossover thrash
- Length: 56:17
- Label: I Scream Records
- Producer: Dennis McKay

Beowülf chronology
| 2¢ (1995) | Westminster & 5th (2007) | Jesus Freak (2011) |

Westminster & 5th
Review scores
| Source | Rating |
|---|---|
| punkrocknews | 1/5 stars |
| Metalfan.nl | 81/100 |
| Lordsofmetal.nl | 88/100 |

Westminster & 5th was released in 2007 and is the fifth studio album by American crossover thrash band Beowülf and the first since 2¢ (1995) and the subsequent hiatus of the band. The sound and playing on Westminster & 5th is reminiscent of Beowülf's first two albums: Beowülf (1986) and Lost My Head... (1988).

== Background ==
Since its inception, Beowülf's only constant member has been Dale Henderson and he is joined on this album by Rich Rowan, Kevin Sullivan and Stefan Crapia. Rowan and Sullivan were a part of the Beowülf line-up for Un-Sentimental (1993). They rejoined Henderson in the band Kool-Whip after Beowülf broke up in 1995. After performing for several years as Kool-Whip and notwithstanding some success, Henderson reverted to playing Beowülf songs. This was followed by the re-release of Beowülf's first two LPs by I Scream Records. The Re-Releases (2004) put the LP's Beowülf (1986) and Lost My Head... (1988) on a single CD and included a studio track recorded in 2004. Around that time, plans were made for a release of a full studio album in the following year. Westminster & 5th was written and recorded in seven months and released in 2007.

The track "Westminster & 5th" runs for 15 minutes and 2 seconds and contains a hidden track. The actual song ends after 4 minutes and 38 seconds and is followed by 7 minutes and 3 seconds of silence. The song "Wide Open Road" then starts, lasting for 3 minutes and 22 seconds. The song "Wide Open Road" is not included on the track list but the song and its lyrics are included in the CD booklet of the album.

== Track listing ==
All tracks are written by Dale Henderson.

| No. | Title | Length |
|---|---|---|
| 1. | "NASCAR Fan" | 1:34 |
| 2. | "Soaked" | 2:39 |
| 3. | "Tilt" | 2:44 |
| 4. | "Mission" | 2:48 |
| 5. | "Stoney Otis" | 2:50 |
| 6. | "GhettoBilly" | 2:21 |
| 7. | "The Splendor" | 4:01 |
| 8. | "Gina Lynne" | 2:19 |
| 9. | "Got an Itch?" | 2:10 |
| 10. | "Shall Arise" | 2:42 |
| 11. | "Tick, Tick, Tick" | 3:38 |
| 12. | "Rough Night (Rough Life)" | 2:34 |
| 13. | "Hitting on Hard Times" | 3:31 |
| 14. | "Is What It Is" | 2:21 |
| 15. | "The Auction" | 3:01 |
| 16. | "Westminster & 5th" | 4:38 |
| 17. | "Wide Open Road" (hidden track on 'Westminster & 5th') | 3:22 |

== Personnel ==
Beowülf

- Dale Henderson – vocals, guitar
- Rich Rowan – drums, percussion
- Kevin Sullivan – bass
- Stefan Crapia – guitar

Additional musicians

- Mr Sir Bailey – conga (on "Westminster & 5th")
- Gina Henderson – backing vocals

Technical Personnel

- Production – Dennis McKay
- Co-production – Dale Henderson
- Mastering – Doug Michals
- CD Design – Simon Soenens
- Photography – LaurenPhotography.com
