= NOFX (1985 EP) =

EP by NOFX
- Released: January 1, 1985
- Recorded: 1984
- Studio: Mystic Studios, Hollywood
- Genre: Hardcore punk, punk rock
- Length: 11:49
- Label: Mystic
- Producer: Phillip (Philco) Raves; NOFX

NOFX chronology
NOFX (1985)	So What If We're on Mystic! (1986)

Professional ratings
Review scores
Source	Rating
Allmusic	2/5 stars

NOFX is the eponymous debut EP by the American punk rock band NOFX. Recorded at Mystic Studios in Hollywood, recorded and produced by Phillip (Philco) Raves. It was released on January 1, 1985 through Mystic Records. The first 500 copies included a lyrics sheet. The next 500 were pressed on light-blue vinyl, while the others were issued on black vinyl. The EP was included in its entirety on Maximum Rocknroll.

The song "Six Pack Girls" made it onto the VHS release Ten Years of Fuckin' Up. It played over a montage of early pictures of the band.

== Track listing ==
All songs written by Fat Mike and Eric Melvin.

1. "Live Your Life" (2:20)
2. "My Friends" (2:17)
3. "Six Pack Girls" (0:35)
4. "Bang Gang" (1:30)
5. "Hit It" (1:53)
6. "Hold It Back" (1:14)
7. "I.D." (2:00)

== Personnel ==
Personnel taken from NOFX liner notes.

NOFX

- Fat Mike – vocals, bass
- Eric Melvin – guitar, backing vocals
- Scott Sellers – drums (credited but did not perform)
- Erik Sandin – drums

Additional personnel

- Philco – production, engineering, mastering
- NOFX – production
- Kris – photography
