= New Regime (American band) =

American punk band

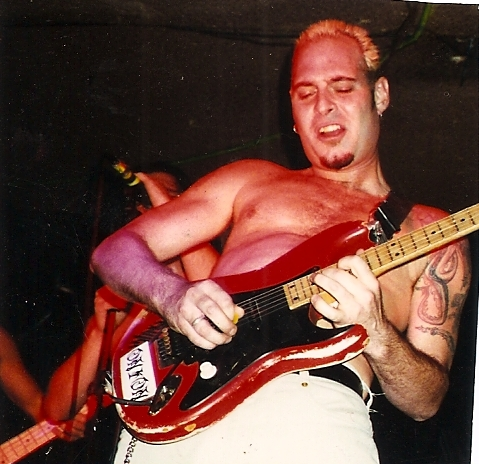
- Guitarist Anthony Gallo

Background information
- Origin: Los Angeles, California, U.S.
- Genres: Hardcore punk
- Years active: 1979–1985
- Labels: Mystic
- Members: Anthony Gallo; Todd Payden; Marc Woodson; Michael Brevetz

New Regime is an American punk band from Los Angeles, California. Initially called "Sodomy Squad", the band was co-founded in 1979 by vocalist Todd Payden and bass player Michael Brevetz while they were students at North Hollywood's Walter Reed Jr. High School. Needing a drummer and guitarist, Brevetz and Payden recruited fellow students Marc Woodson and Anthony Gallo to complete the lineup. The group did one demo recording under the name Sodomy Squad but found it difficult to get shows under the name, opting for the less offensive but more political name "New Regime".

== Musical career ==
New Regime was part of the first wave of the California punk scene, initially playing backyard parties and underground night clubs throughout the San Fernando Valley and Hollywood areas of Los Angeles. They made their own flyers, booked and promoted their own shows, and were soon doing two to three shows a month. In 1983, New Regime recorded two tracks for Mystic Records "Be a Man Go to War" on (Party Animal 2) and "Night Stix" on the (Copulation Compilation), both were produced by label owner Doug Moody. Once New Regime had some vinyl out, they caught the attention of Gary Tovar who was one of the owners and founding fathers of Goldenvoice productions. Goldenvoice was the top concert promoter for punk rock in the early eighties, Tovar immediately booked them as an opening act for his next big punk show. That landmark concert was held at the Grand Olympic Auditorium in April 1984. New Regime was the supporting act for the UK Subhumans, MDC, The Dicks, Red Scare and Tourists. The concert generated more than 5,000 fans. Reviews of the show from Flipside (#42) and Maximum Rock and Roll fanzines showed New Regime as contending contemporaries among the thriving L.A. punk scene. New Regime were offered the opening slot for Suicidal Tendencies in Sacramento after suggestion from (Black Flag, Würm) bassist Chuck Dukowski who caught one of their shows and thought they sounded a lot like them. After these shows and a growing fan base, New Regime went on the road as the opener for Venice punk Icons Suicidal Tendencies in Sacramento.

In 1985, the L.A. punk scene was starting to die out with only a few hangers-on. With the increasing popularity of heavy metal, venues were hard to fill with punk crowds and crossover thrash was becoming the fan favorite. Suicidal Tendencies was starting to move in that direction and guitarist Anthony Gallo started putting in time with his Venice Beach contemporaries, eventually co-founding the band Los Cycos with Mike Muir. New Regime disbanded that same year and briefly reformed in 1994 for a benefit concert. Unfortunately in April 2009, drummer Marc Woodson unexplainably died during an afternoon nap. He was in the middle of scoring his first major motion picture.

== Personal info ==
All three surviving members of New Regime are still doing music in some form or another. Singer songwriter Todd Payden went on to do a solo career as "Huge Mood" and still writes songs and does spoken word poetry. He lives in Carpenteria, California with his wife Sherrie and runs a tour catering business and is a personal chef to the stars. He currently works for race car driver Andy Granatelli. Bassist Michael Brevetz also runs a tour catering business and is also a personal chef to the stars. He is the son of the late Marshall Brevetz founding owner of the world-famous "Thee Experience" night club (from the late sixties and seventies era) in Hollywood, California. He currently lives with his wife and two children in Grover Beach, California and he continues to write and record music. Guitarist Anthony Gallo went on to play with numerous acts including Los Cycos, Cold Shot, Nick Menza, Suicidal Tendencies Jon Nelson and Louiche Mayorga and is the current guitarist for the punk band SIN 34. In 1991 his band Cold Shot contributed two songs to the American independent film Across the Tracks (written and directed by Sandy Tung). In 2013, Cold Shot signed an independent record deal with Eönian Records, releasing all of their original material from 1990. Drummer and songwriter Marc Lee Woodson unexpectedly died in April 2009 of unknown causes. He was 44 years old.

== Discography ==
Title	Release	Label	Band
Party Animal 2	1983	Mystic	New Regime
The COPulation Compilation	1983	Mystic	New Regime
