= 13 Stitches =

EP by NOFX
- Released: 2003
- Genre: Punk rock
- Label: Fat Wreck Chords

NOFX chronology
| Regaining Unconsciousness (2003) | 13 Stitches (2003) | 7" of the Month Club (2005) |

13 Stitches is a 7-inch EP by NOFX. An electric version of the A-side appeared on The War on Errorism. The B-side appeared on the 2004 Warped Tour compilation, and an instrumental version plays on the menu of the DVD Ten Years Of Fuckin' Up. The back cover contains a collage of classic punk albums by bands such as Minor Threat, Misfits and Bad Religion. It was limited to 7,179 copies on yellow vinyl. It is currently out of print.

The title song is about bands that Fat Mike had seen and what he thought about them; the bands referenced in this song are (in particular order) Descendents, The Alley Cats, D.O.A., Millions Of Dead Cops, Ill Repute, and DRI.

== Track listing ==
1. "13 Stitches (acoustic)"
2. "Glass War"
