= Maximum Rocknroll (album) =

Compilation album by NOFX
- Released: Cassette: 1989 (as E Is for Everything); CD: January 1, 1992
- Recorded: 1984–1988
- Genre: Punk rock
- Length: 37:31
- Label: Mystic
- Producer: Doug Moody Productions

NOFX chronology
S&M Airlines (1989)	Maximum Rocknroll (1989)	Ribbed (1991)

Maximum Rocknroll
- alternate cover

Professional ratings
Review scores
Source	Rating
Allmusic	3/5 stars

Maximum Rocknroll is a compilation album by NOFX, originally released on cassette in 1989 by Mystic Records and again three years later on LP and CD.

When the original cassette was released in 1989, it was released under a different title, E is for Everything, though the track listing was identical to the other formats. E is for Everything is currently out of print. The tape also had a different cover, similar to the band's 1985 self-titled EP which depicts a skull with a syringe. The cover of the 1992 version depicts Fat Mike playing his bass.

Despite being referred to as an official release, Fat Mike has been quoted as saying that he was not aware of the album's existence until he saw a copy of it "in a store." He has also been critical of the album, calling it a "totally sucky record", and added, "If you want to hear a totally crappy fucked album then this is the one for you. Don't say I didn't warn you."

== Track listing ==
1. "Live Your Life" – 2:21
2. "My Friends" – 2:17
3. "Six Pack Girls" – 0:35
4. "Bang Gang" – 1:31
5. "Hit It" – 1:53
6. "Hold It Back" – 1:15
7. "ID" – 2:00
8. "Cops and Donuts" – 2:08
9. "Iron Man" (Black Sabbath cover) – 4:44
10. "Shitting Bricks" – 1:55
11. "Mom's Rules" – 1:15
12. "On My Mind" – 1:34
13. "White Bread" – 1:48
14. "Lager in the Dark" – 0:35
15. "Too Mixed Up" – 2:26
16. "Drain Bramaged" – 0:41
17. "Bob Turkee" – 2:09
18. "No Problems" – 1:12
19. "Memories" – 0:55
20. "Beast Within" – 0:56
21. "Instrumental" – 2:36
22. "Ant Attack" – 0:46

== Origin of tracks ==
- Tracks 1–7 from NOFX EP (1985)
- Track 9 from Mystic Radio presents: Covers - Our Favorite Bands Mutilate Your Favorite Songs Compilation (1985)
- Tracks 10–17 from So What If We're on Mystic! EP (1986)
- Tracks 8, 18–22 from The Album LP (1988)
- Track 22 from Cosgrove presents: We Got Power II - Party Animal Compilation (1984)
