= So What If We're on Mystic! =

EP by NOFX
- Released: 1986
- Recorded: 1985 at Mystic Studios
- Genres: Hardcore punk, punk rock
- Length: 12:23
- Label: Mystic
- Producer: Phillip Raves

NOFX chronology
NOFX (1985)	So What If We're on Mystic! (1986)	The P.M.R.C. Can Suck on This (1987)

Professional ratings
Review scores
Source	Rating
Allmusic	2/5 stars

So What If We're on Mystic! is an EP by the American punk rock band NOFX. Recorded at Mystic Studios in Hollywood was recorded by Phillip (Philco) Raves. It was released in 1986 through Mystic Records. The first 1,000 copies were printed on colored vinyl (300 clear-yellow, 700 clear-blue), while the other 2,000 were printed on black vinyl. The EP was included in its entirety on Maximum Rocknroll, though it does have a different track sequence.

== Track listing ==
=== Side A ===
1. "Mom's Rules" (1:15)
2. "On My Mind" (1:34)
3. "Drain Bramaged" (0:41)
4. "Bob Turkee" (2:09)

=== Side B ===
1. "Shitting Bricks" (1:55)
2. "Lager in the Dark" (0:35)
3. "Too Mixed Up" (2:26)
4. "White Bread" (1:48)
