= Cruisin' (Smokey Robinson song) =

1979 single by Smokey Robinson

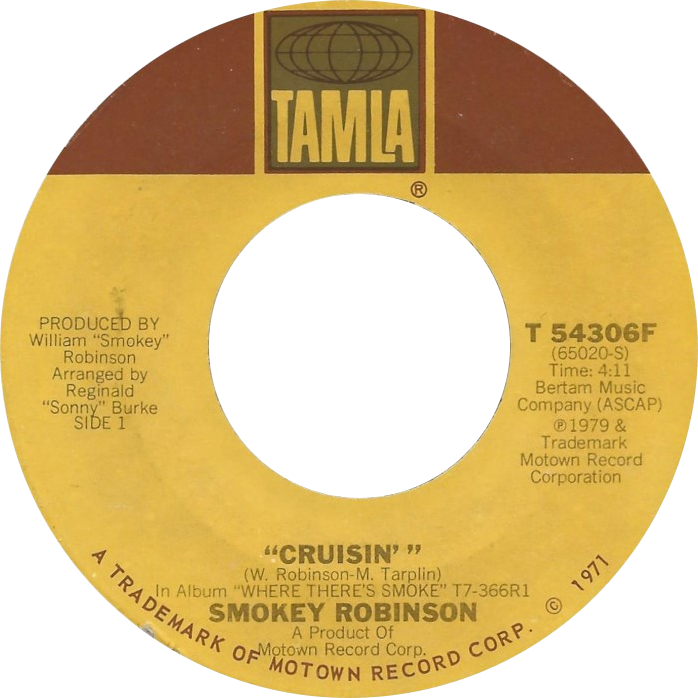
- One of side-A labels of the US single

Single by Smokey Robinson

from the album Where There's Smoke...
- B-side: "Ever Had a Dream"
- Released: August 20, 1979
- Genre: Soul; quiet storm
- Length: 5:53; 4:11 (7-inch edit)
- Label: Tamla (Motown)
- Songwriters: Smokey Robinson; Marv Tarplin
- Producer: Smokey Robinson

Smokey Robinson singles chronology
"Get Ready" (1979)	"Cruisin'" (1979)	"Let Me Be the Clock" (1980)

"Cruisin'" is a song co-written, produced, and performed by the American singer-songwriter Smokey Robinson for Motown Records' Tamla label. It was released on August 20, 1979, as the lead single from his seventh studio album, Where There's Smoke... (1979). One of Robinson's most successful singles outside of his work with the Miracles, "Cruisin'" hit number one on the US Cash Box Top 100 and was also a US Billboard Hot 100 hit, peaking at number four the week of February 2, 1980. It was a top-five hit on the Soul chart as well.

== Background ==
"Cruisin'" was co-written by fellow Miracle Marv Tarplin. It was an even bigger hit in New Zealand, hitting No. 1 on that country's chart. Reportedly, Robinson had a cold during recording. It was originally intended as a B-side for a remake of "Get Ready".

== Charts ==
=== Weekly charts ===
Chart (1979–1980)	Peak position
Australia (Kent Music Report)	70
Canada Top Singles (RPM)	66
New Zealand (Recorded Music NZ)	1
US Billboard Hot 100	4
US Hot Soul Singles (Billboard)	4
US Adult Contemporary (Billboard)	34
US Cash Box Top 100	1

=== Year-end charts ===
Chart (1980)	Rank
New Zealand (Recorded Music NZ)	3
US Top Pop Singles (Billboard)	13
US Cash Box Top 100	23

== Certifications ==
Region	Certification	Certified units/sales
New Zealand (RMNZ)	Gold	10,000^{*}
^{*} Sales figures based on certification alone.

== D'Angelo version ==
"Cruisin'"

Single by D'Angelo

from the album Brown Sugar
- Released: December 5, 1995
- Genre: R&B; soul
- Length: 6:24 (album version); 3:58 (radio edit)
- Label: Cooltempo
- Songwriters: Smokey Robinson; Marv Tarplin
- Producer: Bob Power

D'Angelo singles chronology
"Brown Sugar" (1995)	"Cruisin'" (1995)	"Lady" (1996)

Music video
- "Cruisin'" on YouTube

American neo soul musician D'Angelo recorded a cover of the song for his debut album, Brown Sugar (1995). The cover was released as the album's second single on October 12, 1995, and was commercially successful charting within the top ten of the US R&B charts. the album reached sales of 500,000 copies in the United States by October 1995. This version appeared in the third episode of the UPN sitcom, Moesha in 1996.

=== Composition and arrangement ===
"Cruisin", a cover of Smokey Robinson's 1979 hit of the same name, here features a predominant string section. The longest track on the album, it employs violin, viola and cello, as well as shakers and light percussion, while sleigh bells are featured in the chorus. Flautist Lauryn Vivino contributes with piccolo. The track also features steady piano-playing by D'Angelo, with Brooklyn Funk Essentials-member Bob "Bassy" Brockmann playing the trumpet.

=== Track listing ===
1. "Cruisin'"
2. "Brown Sugar"

=== Charts ===
Chart (1995)	Peak position
New Zealand (Recorded Music NZ)	27
Scottish Singles Sales (Official Charts)	76
UK Singles (Official Charts)	31
UK Dance (Official Charts)	15
UK Hip Hop/R&B (Official Charts)	6
US Billboard Hot 100	53
US Dance Singles Sales (Billboard)	25
US Hot R&B/Hip-Hop Songs (Billboard)	10
US Rhythmic Airplay (Billboard)	20
US Cash Box Top 100	47

== Gwyneth Paltrow and Huey Lewis version ==
"Cruisin'"

Single by Gwyneth Paltrow and Huey Lewis

from the album Duets: Original Soundtrack
- B-side: "Feeling Alright"; "Beginnings / Endings"
- Released: September 11, 2000
- Length: 4:52 (album version); 3:34 (radio edit)
- Label: Hollywood
- Songwriters: Smokey Robinson; Marv Tarplin
- Producer: Larry Klein

Huey Lewis singles chronology
"Cruisin'" (2000)	"Workin' for a Livin'" (2008)

Gwyneth Paltrow singles chronology
"Cruisin'" (2000)	"Bette Davis Eyes" (2001)

American actors and singers Gwyneth Paltrow and Huey Lewis performed a cover of the song in the 2000 film Duets. The song is included on the soundtrack of the film and released as a single on September 11, 2000. The duet spent one week at number one on the US Adult Contemporary chart. It was an even bigger hit in Australia and New Zealand, reaching number one on both country's singles charts, and in Iceland, where it climbed to number four in November 2000.

=== Track listing ===
- Australian and German CD single
1. "Cruisin'" (by Paltrow and Lewis) – 4:51
2. "Feeling Alright" (by Lewis) – 4:02
3. "Beginnings / Endings" (by David Newman) – 1:59

=== Charts ===
==== Weekly charts ====
Chart (2000–2001)	Peak position
Australia (ARIA)	1
Iceland (Íslenski Listinn Topp 40)	4
New Zealand (Recorded Music NZ)	1
US Bubbling Under Hot 100 (Billboard)	9
US Adult Contemporary (Billboard)	1

==== Year-end charts ====
Chart (2000)	Position
US Adult Contemporary (Billboard)	35

Chart (2001)	Position
Australia (ARIA)	27
New Zealand (RIANZ)	12
US Adult Contemporary (Billboard)	10

=== Certifications ===
Region	Certification	Certified units/sales
Australia (ARIA)	2× Platinum	140,000^{^}
New Zealand (RMNZ)	Platinum	10,000^{*}
New Zealand (RMNZ)	Platinum	30,000^{‡}
^{*} Sales figures based on certification alone.^{^} Shipments figures based on certification alone.^{‡} Sales+streaming figures based on certification alone.

=== Release history ===
Region	Date	Format(s)	Label(s)	Ref.
United States	September 11, 2000	Adult contemporary radio	Hollywood	
New Zealand	November 27, 2000	CD	Hollywood	

== Other covers ==
- In 1988, crossover thrash band Beowülf covered the song on their album Lost My Head... But I'm Back on the Right Track.
- Holly Cole, a Canadian jazz singer, covered "Cruisin'" on her 1990 album Girl Talk.
- In 2001, saxophonist Jaared covered this song on his album Foreword. Three years later, the late bassist Wayman Tisdale included a cover of the song on his album Hangtime.
- Filipino acoustic band MYMP released their version on the album The Unreleased Acoustic Collection and again on Back to Acoustic in 2013.
- Japanese singer Maki Ohguro (大黒 摩季 Ōguro Maki) released her version on the 2007 compilation album Best of Best 1000.
- Coolio has also sampled this song on his album Gangsta's Paradise. Although the verse lyrics are changed in his song, the chorus is the same.

== Popular culture ==
- In 2009, Essence magazine included the song in their list of the "25 Best Slow Jams of All Time".
- Robinson's version appears in a 2021 TV commercial for Allstate.
- Robinson's version appears in a 2025 TV commercial for Häagen-Dazs with vin Diesel and Michelle Rodriguez that originally appeared during Super Bowl LIX.

== See also ==
- List of Billboard Adult Contemporary number ones of 2000
- List of Cash Box Top 100 number-one singles of 1980
