= Regaining Unconsciousness =

EP by NOFX
- Released: March 25, 2003
- Genre: Punk rock
- Label: Fat Wreck Chords

NOFX chronology
45 or 46 Songs That Weren't Good Enough to Go on Our Other Records (2002)	Regaining Unconsciousness (2003)	13 Stitches (2003)

Professional ratings
Review scores
Source	Rating
AllMusic	link
Punknews.org	link
Rolling Stone	link

Regaining Unconsciousness is an EP by NOFX, released prior to the release of The War on Errorism. Regaining Unconsciousness was the name of a song that appeared on The War on Errorism, although that song did not appear on this EP.

All tracks appeared on The War on Errorism except for "Hardcore '84" and "Commercial,' which was a mock commercial for War on Errorism.

The lyrics to Regaining Unconsciousness show strong similarities to the poem First they came ... by Martin Niemöller, written in 1946 about the rise of Nazism.

== Track listing ==
=== CD version ===
1. "Medio-core"
2. "Idiots Are Taking Over"
3. "Franco Un-American"
4. "Hardcore '84"
5. "Commercial" (unlisted)

=== Side A ===
1. "Idiots Are Taking Over"

=== Side B ===
1. "Franco Un-American"
2. "Hardcore '84"

== Charts ==
Chart performance for Regaining Consciousness
Chart (2003)	Peak position
Australia (ARIA)	81
US Billboard 200	187
US Independent Albums (Billboard)	10
