= Brown Sugar (D'Angelo album) =

Studio album by D'Angelo
- Released: July 3, 1995
- Recorded: 1994–1995
- Studios: Battery (New York City); RPM (New York City); Pookie Lab (Sacramento)
- Genres: Neo soul; R&B; soul; funk
- Length: 53:17
- Label: EMI
- Producers: D'Angelo; Bob Power; Ali Shaheed Muhammad; Raphael Saadiq

D'Angelo chronology
Brown Sugar (1995)	Live at the Jazz Cafe (1998)

Singles from Brown Sugar
- 1. "Brown Sugar" Released: June 13, 1995; 2. "Cruisin'" Released: December 5, 1995; 3. "Lady" Released: March 5, 1996; 4. "Me and Those Dreamin' Eyes of Mine" Released: 1996

Brown Sugar is the debut studio album by the American musician D'Angelo, released on July 3, 1995, through EMI. The album was recorded during 1994 and 1995 in sessions at Battery Studios and RPM Studios in New York City and at the Pookie Lab in Sacramento. Its production, instrumentation, arrangements, and songwriting were primarily handled by D'Angelo, who employed both vintage recording equipment and modern electronic devices. The songs feature earnest lyrics about love and romance, set against a fusion of contemporary R&B and traditional soul music with elements of funk, quiet storm, and hip hop music.

Brown Sugar debuted at number 6 on the US Billboard Top R&B Albums chart, selling 300,000 copies in its first two months. With the help of its four singles, it spent sixty-five weeks on the Billboard 200 chart and received Platinum certification within a year of its release. Brown Sugar was met with widespread acclaim and earned D'Angelo accolades including four Grammy Award nominations. Regarded by music journalists as a pivotal release in neo soul, the album brought commercial exposure to the burgeoning musical movement amid the prominence of producer-driven, digitally approached R&B. Brown Sugar is also widely credited with launching the neo-soul movement, with the term "neo soul" in fact even being coined by D'Angelo's manager Kedar Massenburg in the short time after the album became a success.

== Background ==
By 1991, singer-songwriter and multi-instrumentalist Michael D'Angelo Archer had formed his native–Richmond, Virginia, musical group—Michael Archer and Precise—and had achieved success on the Amateur Night competition at Harlem's Apollo Theater. Soon after, he dropped out of school and moved to New York City to develop his career. The group had previously enjoyed some notice in Richmond, evenly dividing their repertoire between soul covers and originals, while D'Angelo accumulated compositions of his own and developed his songwriting skills. The group's turnout on Amateur Night resulted in three consecutive wins and a cash prize, after which, upon returning home to Richmond, D'Angelo was inspired to produce his own album and began composing material.

After a brief tenure as a member of the hip hop group I.D.U. (Intelligent, Deadly but Unique), D'Angelo signed a publishing deal with EMI Music in 1991 after catching the attention of record executives through a demo tape, which was originally by the group. After impressing EMI execs with a three-hour impromptu piano recital, D'Angelo was signed to a recording contract in 1993. A&R-man Gary Harris was primarily responsible for his signing, while manager Kedar Massenburg helped negotiate the contract as well. Massenburg became D'Angelo's manager after hearing of him through "the buzz on the streets". He had previously managed hip hop group Stetsasonic and formed the artist management firm Kedar Entertainment in 1991, which he diversified into production, music publishing and publicity.

In 1994, his first significant success came in the form of the hit single "U Will Know". D'Angelo co-wrote and co-produced the song for the all-male R&B supergroup Black Men United, which featured the R&B singers Brian McKnight, Usher, R. Kelly, Boyz II Men, Raphael Saadiq and Gerald Levert. D'Angelo composed the music for "U Will Know", while his brother, Luther Archer, wrote the lyrics. Featured on the soundtrack to the film Jason's Lyric (1994), the single peaked at number 5 on the Hot R&B/Hip-Hop Singles & Tracks and number 28 on the Billboard Hot 100. The music video for "U Will Know" featured D'Angelo as the group's choir director; he reprised the role for the live performance of the song at the Soul Train Music Awards. That same year, he wrote and produced the song "Overjoyed" for the Boys Choir of Harlem, which appeared on their album The Sound of Hope (1994). The success of "U Will Know" helped build the buzz surrounding D'Angelo, which was followed by a number of highly promoted performance showcases, and added to the buzz among music industry insiders.

== Recording and production ==
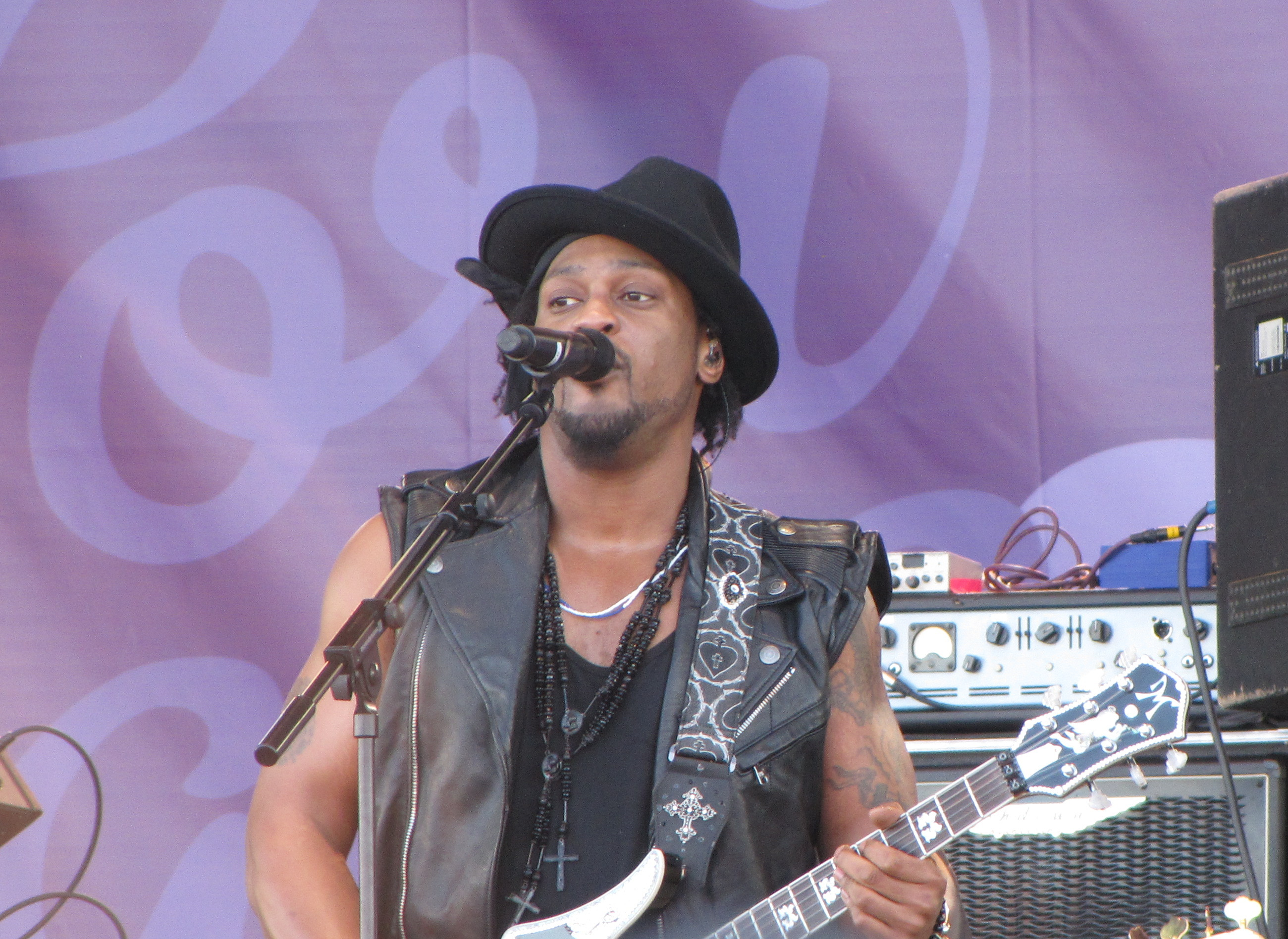
D'Angelo (pictured in 2012) played a variety of instruments on the album, including guitar.

After his successful performance with his group Precise at the Apollo Theater in 1991, D'Angelo received a $500 check for his work at the venue and used most of it to purchase a four-track recorder and a keyboard. At his mother's house in Richmond, he began writing and recording most of the material that would constitute Brown Sugar during 1991 and 1992. Recording for the album took place during 1994 and 1995 at Battery Studios and RPM Studios in New York City, and at the Pookie Lab studio in Sacramento, California, which served as the personal recording studio of R&B musician and record producer Raphael Saadiq. Additional recording took place at Back Pocket Studios in New York City for the track "Cruisin'".

In contrast to the production style of contemporary R&B at the time, which sought well-known record producers for an artist's project, D'Angelo handled most of the album's production, as well as contributing all of the vocals. While most of the production was handled by D'Angelo, other producers contributed as well, including Saadiq, Ali Shaheed Muhammad of A Tribe Called Quest and studio engineer Bob Power.

D'Angelo's expertise and ability to play various instruments, including drums, saxophone, guitar, bass, and keyboards, aided him in the recording of Brown Sugar, as most of the album's instrumentation and production were credited to his name. In a 1995 interview, he discussed the influence that musician Prince had on his approach to recording the album, stating "I was one of those guys who read the album credits and I realized that Prince was a true artist. He wrote, produced, and performed, and that's the way I wanted to do it." For the album, D'Angelo and the production personnel utilized antiquated, vintage equipment, including Wurlitzer musical instruments and dated effects boxes, as well as modern electronic devices such as drum machines and computers. Notable instruments used by D'Angelo were the Fender Rhodes electric piano and the Hammond organ. The album was later mastered by engineer Herb Powers Jr. at The Hit Factory mastering studio in New York City.

== Music ==
Born to a Pentecostal-minister father, D'Angelo was brought up to an early appreciation of gospel music, while his mother, a jazz enthusiast, introduced him to the musical complexities of trumpeter Miles Davis and the funk and soul music of the 1970s. In addition to old gospel records, these factors inspired him during the making of Brown Sugar, as D'Angelo drew upon his roots of traditional gospel and soul, and infused the sound of contemporary R&B and hip hop music to create a stylistically unique and soulful sound for the album. The album has been noted by critics for its classic soul elements and influences, as well as the sound of live instruments and organic grooves, which are reminiscent of the work of Stevie Wonder and Sly & the Family Stone. Its production contrasts the producer-driven and digital approach of contemporary R&B at the time of its release.

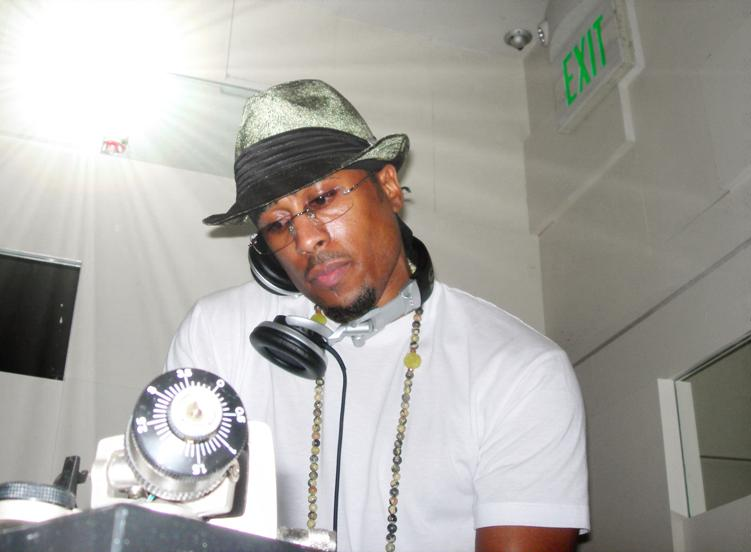
The album's title track was produced by D'Angelo and Ali Shaheed Muhammad (2008).

The album's sound is prominently driven by keyboards, sensual vocals, and smooth melodies, while it evokes the work of such artists as Prince, Isaac Hayes, Marvin Gaye, Smokey Robinson and the Isley Brothers. The quiet storm love song "Cruisin'", a cover of Robinson's 1979 hit of the same name, features a string section. Along with the album's modern aesthetic and vintage texture, Brown Sugar combines the sounds of blues, gospel and jazz in a contemporary fashion. According to music journalist Peter Shapiro, "Lady" uses "the jazzy hallmarks of bohemian soul to emphasize the singer's insecurity". Most of the songs on the album have a stripped-down feel, without complex orchestrations, and have heavy drum beats and bass lines, which are accompanied by electric piano riffs and minimal guitar work. Music writer Robert Christgau finds Brown Sugar to be "bass-driven rather than voice-led".

=== Vocals ===
D'Angelo's singing throughout Brown Sugar is a gospel-influenced, falsetto crooning style, which critics have compared the singing of Prince, Al Green, Donny Hathaway, and Sam Cooke. Despite the album's retro influence, music writers have noted his delivery as having a hip hop approach and "swagger", as one critic described the album as a "blend of classic soul and urban attitude". Another writer described the album's vibe as "sultry" and D'Angelo's vocal delivery as "sly". Music journalist Jon Caramanica later called D'Angelo a "classicist, in other words, cloaked in the guise of a hip-hop roughneck." Shapiro viewed the vocal production as similar to that of Prince's Sign o' the Times (1987). The album's closing track "Higher" features D'Angelo's organ set to a choir of his overdubbed vocals, while "Jonz in My Bonz", which compares love to an addiction, features D'Angelo's falsetto moans overdubbed in an array for effect.

According to D'Angelo, the hip hop influence present on the album "came from the Native Tongues movement - Tribe Called Quest, Gang Starr and Main Source." The title track features the most hip hop influence on the album, as Ali Shaheed Muhammad's co-production for the song developed a seamless integration of hip hop beats into D'Angelo's old school-influenced material. The vocal delivery on the track resembles the flow of most emcees at the time. In a 1995 interview, D'Angelo cited hip hop artists Rakim and KRS-One as influences, and explained his affinity with rapping, stating "All rap is street soul. They just have a different method."

=== Lyrics ===
With the exception of the title track, a thinly veiled ode to smoking marijuana, most of the album's material consists of traditional romance ballads and love songs, in the style of classic soul music. The lyrical content of the album closer, "Higher", combines the spiritual love of God and the carnal love of a woman, and is similar to the lyricism of Prince, who has been noted by music writers for exploring the "eternal dichotomy" of spirituality and sexuality. Music writers have noted the lyrical "openness" of the album, along with qualities of honesty and "earnestness" in D'Angelo's songwriting, in comparison to most contemporary R&B at the time. "Alright" deals with the consequences of a relationship and reassurance of its security. "Shit, Damn, Motherfucker" was cited by Shapiro as "the nastiest cheating song since that hoary old standard of 60s rock, 'Hey Joe'", It features a string of emphatic interjections (the chorus line "shit, damn, motherfucker" describes his reaction) and rhetorical questions by the narrator after walking in on his wife and his best friend in bed together. Music critic Christopher John Farley described the chorus as a "little like the Fuhrman tapes, with a beat", while Mark Anthony Neal found the song to be "drenched with Marvin Gaye’s paranoia."

== Marketing and sales ==
Brown Sugar was released on July 3, 1995, by EMI. The album debuted at number 6 on the US Billboard Top R&B Albums chart in the week of July 22, 1995. It ultimately peaked at number 4 in the week of February 24, 1996, and spent a total of 54 weeks on the chart. Brown Sugar also spent 65 weeks on the Billboard 200 and peaked at number 22 on the chart. It sold 300,000 copies within its two months of release. The album had been selling 35,000 to 40,000 copies a week through to November 1995, and by January 1996, it had sold 400,000 copies. With the help of its four singles, including the Gold-certified, half-million-selling Billboard Hot 100 hit "Lady" and R&B Top 10 singles "Brown Sugar" and "Cruisin'", the album reached sales of 500,000 copies in the United States by October 1995.

In late 1995, D'Angelo toured in promotion of the album, and his concert at The Jazz Café in London produced the 1996 live album Live at the Jazz Cafe. On February 7, 1996, Brown Sugar was certified platinum by the Recording Industry Association of America, following shipments in excess of one million copies in the U.S. The album was certified gold in Canada on May 9, 2000. Its total sales have been estimated by several sources within the range of 1.5 million to over two million copies.

Brown Sugar was re-released as a two-disc deluxe edition on August 25, 2017, by Virgin and Universal Music Enterprises. The reissue featured remastering by Russell Elevado, a 20-page booklet essayed by Nelson George, and 21 additional songs. The bonus material included instrumentals, a cappella versions, and remixes by CJ Mackintosh, Dallas Austin, King Tech, Erick Sermon, and Incognito; seven of the 21 additional songs had never been released before commercially, while the others were previously available only on vinyl.

== Critical reception and legacy ==
Professional ratings
Review scores
Source	Rating
AllMusic	4.5/5 stars
Chicago Tribune	3/4 stars
Entertainment Weekly	A
The Guardian	5/5 stars
MSN Music (Expert Witness)	A−
NME	9/10
Pitchfork	9.2/10
Rolling Stone	4/5 stars
The Rolling Stone Album Guide	4/5 stars
Spin	8/10

Brown Sugar was acclaimed by contemporary music critics. Martin Johnson of the Chicago Tribune praised D'Angelo's fusing of "elements of Prince, early '70s Smokey Robinson and post-Woodstock Sly and the Family Stone". NME wrote that "D'Angelo's downbeat world blurs the borders..., kicking over the traces of the genre game". Time magazine's Christopher John Farley said that D'Angelo's austere sound on the album serves as a reminder of the 1970s' musical atmosphere, but updated for listeners in the 1990s. In his review for Vibe, James Hunter wrote that he is "determined to give pre-hip hop forms like blues, soul, gospel, and jazz a mid-'90s vibe", and "inhabits his songs from odd angles, without non-stop Vandross-style aural showmanship." Rolling Stone magazine's Cheo H. Coker praised Brown Sugar for its soulful sound and musical deviation from the New Jack-style of R&B at the time, stating:

Call him an ndegéocello (Swahili for "free as a bird"), a rebel soul... Like his fellow retrolutionaries Me'Shell NdegéOcello, Joi, Omar and Dionne Farris, he's shattering the conventional definition of "black music." It doesn't have to be a lackluster genre in which format, not content, determines heavy rotation. Brown Sugar is a reminder of where R&B has been and, if the genre is to resurrect its creative relevance like a phoenix rising from the ashes, where it needs to go.

Despite calling it "lyrically a bit simple", Yahoo! Music's Jeff Watson commended D'Angelo for his musicianship and wrote that his "marvelous voice and smooth instrumentation complement his solid songwriting skills". Having been lukewarm toward the record in a contemporary review for The Village Voice, Robert Christgau later wrote in MSN Music that he "wasn't surprised to have warmed to it ... D'Angelo's concentration is formidable, his groove complex yet primal." The song "Brown Sugar" was nominated for the 1996 Grammy Award for Best Male R&B Vocal Performance and Best R&B Song. The album was also nominated for Best R&B Album. "Lady" was nominated for a 1997 Grammy Award for Best Male R&B Vocal Performance. It was also ranked number 21 on The Village Voice's 1995 Pazz & Jop critics' poll and number 12 in The Wire's annual critics' poll.

Since its initial reception, the album's sound has been dubbed as "neo soul". D'Angelo's commercial breakthrough with Brown Sugar has been credited by writers and music critics for providing commercial visibility to the emerging neo soul movement of the mid-1990s, as well as inspiration behind the coinage of the term neo soul. The term was originally coined by Kedar Massenburg to market D'Angelo's music, as well as work by Erykah Badu, Lauryn Hill, and Maxwell. In a 1996 article for the Chicago Tribune, critic Greg Kot cited Brown Sugar as "arguably where the current soul revival started". USA Today's Steve Jones wrote that the album "paved the way for innovative albums by Maxwell, Tony Rich and Eric Benet". Yahoo! Music's Jeff Watson wrote that the album "single-handedly revitalized the creatively-dormant R&B scene". Robert Christgau has dubbed it a "modern wellspring" for neo soul. Mojo ranked it number 97 on its "100 Modern Classics" list, and Rolling Stone included Brown Sugar on its list of "Essential Recordings of the 90's". In 2020, Rolling Stone ranked the album at number 183 on their updated list of the 500 Greatest Albums of All Time.

== Track listing ==
No.	Title	Writer(s)	Producer(s)	Length
1.	"Brown Sugar"	D'Angelo, Ali Shaheed Muhammad	D'Angelo, Ali Shaheed Muhammad	4:22
2.	"Alright"	D'Angelo	D'Angelo, Bob Power	5:13
3.	"Jonz in My Bonz"	D'Angelo, Angela Stone	D'Angelo	5:56
4.	"Me and Those Dreamin' Eyes of Mine"	D'Angelo	D'Angelo, Bob Power	4:46
5.	"Shit, Damn, Motherfucker"	D'Angelo	D'Angelo, Bob Power	5:14
6.	"Smooth"	D'Angelo, Luther Archer	D'Angelo, Bob Power	4:19
7.	"Cruisin'"	William Robinson, Marvin Tarplin	D'Angelo	6:24
8.	"When We Get By"	D'Angelo	D'Angelo	5:44
9.	"Lady"	D'Angelo, Raphael Saadiq	D'Angelo, Raphael Saadiq	5:46
10.	"Higher"	D'Angelo, Luther Archer, Rodney Archer	D'Angelo, Bob Power	5:28

== Personnel ==
Credits are adapted from the album's liner notes.

#	Title	Notes
	Brown Sugar	All songs composed, written, arranged, performed and produced by D'Angelo, except where indicated. Executive producer: Kedar Massenburg for Kedar Entertainment, Inc. A&R direction: Gary Harris and Kedar Massenburg; Management: Kedar Entertainment, Inc. A&R administration: Laura Rinaldi; Business management: V. Brown & Co. Legal representation: Fred Davis, Esq. Additional assistant engineers: Suz Dweyer, Julio Peralta, Martin Czember; Mastered by Herb Powers Jr. at Hit Factory Mastering, NYC; Art direction: Henry Marquez; Design: C.M.O.N. Photography: Per Gustafson
1	"Brown Sugar"	Written by D'Angelo and Ali Shaheed Muhammed; Produced by D'Angelo and Ali Shaheed Muhammad; Vocal arrangements by D'Angelo; All vocals by D'Angelo; Musical arrangements by D'Angelo; All instruments by D'Angelo; Drum programming by Ali Shaheed Muhammad; Recorded at Battery Studios, NYC; Additional engineering by Tim Latham at Soundtrack, NYC; Mixed by Bob Power at Battery Studios, NYC; Assistant engineer: G-Spot
2	"Alright"	Written by D'Angelo; Produced by D'Angelo and Bob Power; Vocal arrangements by D'Angelo; All vocals by D'Angelo; Musical arrangements by D'Angelo; All instruments by D'Angelo; Guitar by Bob Power; Recorded by Bob Power at Battery Studios, NYC; Assistant engineer: G-Spot; Mixed by Bob Power at Battery Studios, NYC
3	"Jonz in My Bonz"	Written by D'Angelo and Angie Stone; Produced by D'Angelo; Vocal arrangements by D'Angelo; All vocals by D'Angelo; Musical arrangements by D'Angelo; All instruments by D'Angelo; Guitar by Bob Power; Recorded by G-Spot at Battery Studios, NYC; Assistant engineer: Rob Farrell, Chaz Harper; Mixed by Russell Elevado at Battery Studios, NYC; Additional engineering by Tim Latham at Battery Studios, NYC
4	"Me and Those Dreamin' Eyes of Mine"	Written by D'Angelo; Produced by D'Angelo and Bob Power; Vocal arrangements by D'Angelo; All vocals by D'Angelo; Musical arrangements by D'Angelo; Guitar by Bob Power; All other instruments by D'Angelo; Recorded by Bob Power at Battery Studios, NYC; Assistant engineer: G-Spot; Mixed by Bob Power at Battery Studios, NYC
5	"Shit, Damn, Motherfucker"	Written by D'Angelo; Produced by D'Angelo and Bob Power; Vocal arrangements by D'Angelo; All vocals by D'Angelo; Musical arrangements by D'Angelo; Guitar by Bob Power; All other instruments by D'Angelo; Recorded by Bob Power at Battery Studios, NYC; Assistant engineer: G-Spot; Mixed by Bob Power at Battery Studios, NYC
6	"Smooth"	Written by D'Angelo and Luther Archer; Produced by D'Angelo and Bob Power; Vocal arrangements by D'Angelo; All vocals by D'Angelo; Musical arrangements by D'Angelo; Bass by Larry Grenadier; Guitar by Mark Whitfield; Drums by Gene Lake; All other instruments by D'Angelo; Recorded by Bob Power at Battery Studios, NYC; Assistant engineer: G-Spot; Mixed by Bob Power at Battery Studios, NYC
7	"Cruisin'"	Written by William Robinson and Marvin Tarplin; Produced by D'Angelo; Vocal arrangements by D'Angelo; All vocals by D'Angelo; Musical arrangements by D'Angelo; All instruments by D'Angelo; Orchestra conductor and arranger: Dunn Pierson; Orchestra contractor and copyist: Eugene Bianco; Flute and piccolo: Laura Vivino; Violins: Gerald Tarack, Marilyn Wright, Regis Iandorio, Matthew Raimondi, Masako Yanagita, Natalie Kriegler, Alexander Simionescu, Winterton Garvey; Viola: Julien Barber, Olivia Koppell, Sue Pray, Eufrosina Railenu; Cello: Jesse Levy, Seymour Barab; Recorded by G-Spot at Battery Studios, NYC; Assistant engineer: Rob Farrell; Additional recording by Butch Jones at Back Pocket Studios, NYC; Mixed by G-Spot at Battery Studios, NYC; Additional engineering by Tim Latham at Quad Studios, NYC
8	"When We Get By"	Written by D'Angelo; Produced by D'Angelo; Vocal arrangements by D'Angelo; All vocals by D'Angelo; Musical arrangements by D'Angelo; Trumpet by Bob "Bassy" Brockman; All other instruments by D'Angelo; Recorded by G-Spot at Battery Studios, NYC; Assistant engineer: Rob Farrell; Mixed by Russell Elevado at Battery Studios, NYC; Assistant engineer: Chaz Harper; Additional engineering by Tim Latham at Battery Studios, NYC
9	"Lady"	Written by D'Angelo and Raphael Saadiq; Produced by D'Angelo and Raphael Saadiq; Vocal arrangements by D'Angelo; All vocals by D'Angelo; Musical arrangements by D'Angelo and Raphael Saadiq; Bass by Raphael Saadiq; Piano by Tim Christian; Guitar by Raphael Saadiq; Additional guitar by D'Angelo; Recorded by Darrin Harris at Pookie Lab, Sacramento, CA; Additional recording by G-Spot at Battery Studios, NYC; Assistant engineer: Rob Farrell, Chaz Harper; Mixed by Russell Elevado at Battery Studios, NYC; Additional engineering by Tim Latham at Quad Studios, NYC
10	"Higher"	Written by D'Angelo, Luther Archer and Rodney Archer; Produced by D'Angelo and Bob Power; Vocal arrangements by D'Angelo; All vocals by D'Angelo; Musical arrangements by D'Angelo; Bass by Will Lee; Drums by Ralph Rolle; Rhythm guitar by Bob Power; All other instruments by D'Angelo; Recorded by Bob Power at RPM Studios, NYC; Additional recording at Battery Studios, NYC; Assistant engineer: G-Spot; Mixed by Bob Power at RPM Studios, NYC

== Charts ==
=== Weekly charts ===
Chart (1995–1996)	Peak position
Australian Albums (ARIA)	158
Dutch Albums (Album Top 100)	66
New Zealand Albums (RMNZ)	47
UK Albums (Official Charts)	57
UK R&B Albums (Official Charts)	10
US Billboard 200	22
US Top R&B/Hip-Hop Albums (Billboard)	4

Chart (2025)	Peak position
Japanese Download Albums (Billboard Japan)	32

=== Year-end charts ===
Chart (1995)	Position
US Billboard 200	176
US Top R&B/Hip-Hop Albums (Billboard)	41

Chart (1996)	Position
US Billboard 200	70
US Top R&B/Hip-Hop Albums (Billboard)	12

=== Singles ===
Year	Single	Peak positions			
Year	Single	US Pop	US R&B	US Dance	US R&B Airplay
1995	"Brown Sugar"	27	5	14	26
1995	"Cruisin'"	53	10	25	20
1996	"Lady"	10	2	7	10
1996	"Me and Those Dreamin' Eyes of Mine"	74	25	2	—
"—" denotes a release that did not chart.

== Certifications ==
Region	Certification	Certified units/sales
Canada (Music Canada)	Gold	50,000^{^}
United Kingdom (BPI)	Gold	100,000^{^}
United States (RIAA)	Platinum	1,000,000^{^}
^{^} Shipments figures based on certification alone.

== See also ==
- Maxwell's Urban Hang Suite
- Road to Freedom

== Bibliography ==
- Christopher John Farley (2002). Aaliyah: More Than a Woman. Simon and Schuster. ISBN 0-7434-5566-5.
- D'Angelo (1995). Brown Sugar. (CD liner notes). EMI Records, 1290 Avenue of the Americas, New York, NY 10104.
- Thomson Gale Staff (1998). Contemporary Black Biography: Profiles Form the International Black Community. Vol. 13. Gale Research Inc. ISBN 0-7876-3247-3.
- Ashyia N. Henderson; David G. Oblender (2001). Contemporary Black Biography: Profiles Form the International Black Community. Vol. 27. Gale Group. ISBN 0-7876-4618-0.
- Stacy A. Onnell (1997). Contemporary Musicians. Vol. 20. Gale Research. ISBN 0-7876-1177-8.
- Maxine Block; Anna Herthe Rothe; Marjorie Dent Candee; Charles Moritz (2001). Current Biography Yearbook. Vol. 62, No. 5. The H.W. Wilson Company. ISBN 0-8242-1016-6.
- Nathan Brackett; Christian Hoard, eds. (2004). The New Rolling Stone Album Guide. Completely Revised and Updated 4th Edition. Simon and Schuster. ISBN 0-7432-0169-8.
- Todd Boyd (2007). The Notorious Ph.D.'s Guide to the Super Fly '70s. Random House, Inc. ISBN 978-0-7679-2187-9.
- Peter Shapiro, Al Spicer (2006). The Rough Guide to Soul and R&B. Rough Guides. ISBN 1-84353-264-6.
