= Un-Sentimental =

Studio album by Beowülf
- Released: July 13, 1993
- Recorded: 1992–1993 at Eldorado Recording Studios in Hollywood, California
- Genre: Alternative metal; hardcore punk; crossover thrash
- Length: 46:58
- Label: Restless
- Producer: Dennis Herring

Beowülf chronology
Lost My Head... But I'm Back on the Right Track (1988)	Un-Sentimental (1993)	2 Cents (1995)

Un-Sentimental is the third album by Beowülf, released in 1993. It is the only official Beowülf album to be released under the band name BWF. This album marked a change for the band, drifting more to rock and moving over from their classic hardcore thrash style. Released during the grunge era, Beowülf achieved small success with the album in Los Angeles as the band had gathered some followers.

Un-Sentimental was the first new album since the band ended with a temporary break up in the early 1990s. Dale Henderson, the band's founder and chief songwriter, is the only original member appearing on the album. Therefore, many purists object to it being called "Beowülf" or simply "BWF" and consider it to be a Dale Henderson solo project. According to Henderson, Mike Jensen (guitar), Paul Yamada (bass) and Michael Alvarado (drums) all declined the invitation to reunite.

A music video for "P.O.W. (Pissed Off White Boy)" was made.

== Miscellaneous ==
- According to the liner notes, the song "P.O.W." is "in no way meant as a disrespect to the many homies who were and are prisoners of war".
- Drummer Rich Rowan, who played on this album and left the band in 1994, would reunite with Beowülf to record their fifth studio album, Westminster & 5th, in 2007 and its 2011 follow-up Jesus Freak.

== Track listing ==
1. "Cast Away" (2:30)
2. "Uplifted" (4:56)
3. "Un-Sentimental" (3:57)
4. "Victim of Riches" (1:27)
5. "P.O.W. (Pissed Off White Boy)" (5:02)
6. "Articles" (6:07)
7. "Special One" (3:09)
8. "Last Days" (5:13)
9. "Hole in My Pocket" (3:49)
10. "Said a Prayer" (4:28)
11. "Wish Your Life" (6:23)
12. "Aint No Place Like Home" (3:17)

== Personnel ==
- Dale Henderson – vocals and guitar
- Clint Schuyler – guitar
- Kevin Sullivan – bass
- Rich Rowan – drums
