= Agression (band) =

American hardcore punk band

Agression is an American hardcore punk band from Silver Strand Beach, Oxnard, California, United States.

Agression was one of the first bands of the "Nardcore" scene and an early example of the "skate punk" style. The band fused skate culture with the punk scene, featuring a song about skateboarding ("Intense Energy") and a Glen E. Friedman photo of Arthur Lake skating a pool on their first and most popular album, Don't Be Mistaken.

The band is known for its fast-paced, aggressive songs.

== History ==
=== Early 1980s - 2000 ===
Before becoming a punk band, in 1979 singer Mark Hickey, guitarist Henry Knowles, and bassist Bob Clark skated for Sims. Clark claims to be a co-founding member of Agression. Although Clark was verifiably close friends with Hickey and Knowles at the time, Hickey contradicts this claim in an interview with The Hooligan magazine.

Regardless, Clark was the original and most senior bassist according to the timeline of lineups and albums released with his participation. Big Bob, Mark and Henry were roommates. The unit was one of the first groups to be involved with the Better Youth Organization (BYO) – the collective started by Shawn and Mark Stern of Youth Brigade — and contributed three songs, "Intense Energy", "Dear John Letter" and "Rat Race" to Someone Got Their Head Kicked In, the label's 1982 compilation album. In a 1984 interview, Clark noted that the three songs contributed to the BYO compilation increased the band's exposure and access to out-of-state shows:

Those three songs got us a lot of attention though because right after it came out we went on tour with Battalion of Saints and made it as far as Oklahoma.

Don't Be Mistaken, their debut album, was released on BYO in 1983, full of rapid-fire skatepunk rhythms. Contributions to various Mystic Records compilations followed, with Agression's sound wavering between skatepunk and more generic heavy metal; a self-titled LP on that label appeared in 1985, as did the "official" bootleg of an Agression show at the New York club CBGB.

Agression was able to get as far as CBGB with the aid of their manager, Scott Hatch, who also managed the more established hardcore outfit Fear, among a stable of many hardcore punk rock bands, Killer Pussy, TSOL and Rik L Rik. As Hickey said at the time, it was difficult not to appreciate the coolness of Agression and Fear listed on one bill. Aber left the group in 1985 for a spot with Angry Samoans. Agression went through many iterations of band members, with vocalist Mark Hickey being the only original member remaining throughout the band's career.

Agression relocated from Oxnard, California to a more central location in Denver, Colorado as its home base in the late 1980s. Knowles left the band after a few years in Colorado, returning to California. A short while after, Clark also left the band. For a short time, Agression went on hiatus as new members were sought out.

The remaining members in Colorado were Hickey and Mike Minnick, A.K.A. "Fluffy Machete", who joined in 1986. Minnick was well known in the So-Cal punk scene as the former drummer of two seminal Nardcore bands, Ill Repute and Habeas Corpus. To fill the vacuum left by the loss of Knowles, in 1992, Hickey permanently added his friend and locally well known guitar virtuoso Kent Taylor, and went through several fill-in bassists including "Jelly Roll" (Kevin Sisson), and Conrad Sear, before finally settling on bassist Adam Pittman A.K.A. "Commander Adama" as a permanent addition to the band. Sear was temporarily retained for a short period as a rhythm guitarist, and left the band soon after. With the new Colorado lineup, Agression began touring again, and recorded two albums, Nowhere to Run and Live at the Lair, a live album recorded in the infamous Denver punk club, the "Lion's Lair".

Hickey's version of Agression fizzled out and disbanded after he finally pulled the plug in June 1998.

The distinctive "bar-s" logo the band used since 1981, designed by artist Jamie Hernandez (illustrator of the comic Love and Rockets) resembling a black bar with a single lightning-bolt style S, or more accurately, the Sig, or Sowilo Germanic rune meaning "sun", or "victory" offset to the left of the bar, was misunderstood by many of the younger members of the punk scene. The logo was mistaken for a Nazi "SS" symbol, and rumors circulated that the band were racists, Nazis or white supremacists. This was compounded by Hickey's self-identification as a "traditional skinhead".

=== 2000 onwards ===
In early 2000, the band reformed in San Jose, California, with Knowles, Rob Thacker, Ryan Fassler and Drew Klein. This line-up continued through many shows with bands like Dead Kennedys, DI, Jim Jones Brigade, and Pitch Black. This incarnation of the band continued until the summer of 2001. In late 2001, Knowles contacted original drummer Mark Aber/Rooney about playing together again with Big Bob on bass but Henry became ill.

The new millennium brought about the deaths of two of its founding members; Hickey in 2000, due to acute liver failure, and Knowles to leukemia in 2002.

In mid-2002, a "Henry Knowles Memorial Show" took place at Skatelab, in Simi Valley, California, featuring the "Nardcore All-Stars" (who did an all-Agression song set list), Rejected Society, The Missing 23rd, Dr. Know and Ill Repute, among others.

In 2005 Dr. Strange Records released a tribute album called Taking Out A Little Agression that features bands like D.I., Fang, JFA, MDC or Verbal Abuse covering Agression songs.

In October 2006, several former members of Agression played the Spike Fest in Long Beach. This lineup consisted of Clark, Mark Aber, Thacker, Dave Haro, and JellyRoll for a few songs. This continued in November for two shows in Northern California. From June 14–17, 2007, the same lineup minus JellyRoll performed in Northern California in a four-day tour to celebrate the release of the Agression tribute compilation. This release is out on Dr. Strange Records on CD and vinyl, and was expected to be available in stores worldwide on July 24, 2007. This compilation is dedicated to all those who have ever played in Agression along the years. Track # 28 is a song called "What Did I Do", which was written and recorded by Henry Knowles a few years before he died.

More recently, Aggression played at Punk Rock Picnic 2011 on Saturday, April 9, 2011, with the latest line-up: Mark Aber/Rooney, Clark, Thacker, Jess Leedy and Danny Dorman from Circle One. They have continued to play shows and are set to record a new album for DC-Jam Records.

On January 20, 2013, a man was shot and killed and another man was stabbed when a fight at an Agression concert spilled into the parking lot in Torrance.

To this day, many bands are still highly influenced by the sound of Agression. The high-energy, surf guitar influenced sound and the distinctive voice of Hickey set them apart from contemporaries with their unique sound and attitude.

== Members ==
Original members:

- Mark Hickey - vocals
- Henry Knowles - guitar
- Big Bob Clark - bass (died 2021)
- Mark Aber/Van Haeln - drums. Other former drummers include Larry White, John Mitchell.

Current line-up:

- Mike Hickey - lead vocals
- Mike Minnick "Fluffy Machete" - drums
- Rob Thacker - guitar
- Fuse Henry - bass

== Discography ==
- Better Youth Organization Presents - Someone Got Their Head Kicked In Compilation LP (BYO, 1982)
- Don't Be Mistaken LP (BYO 1983)
- Copulation - The Sound of Hollywood Compilation LP (Mystic, 1984)
- Nardcore Compilation LP (Mystic, 1984)
- Agression Bootleg LP, (Mystic/Bootleg 1985)
- Agression LP (Mystic 1985)
- Live Underground Railroad 7" (Mystic 1986)
- Best of Agression CD (Mystic 1995)
- Nowhere to Run CD (High Five Records 1995)
- Live at the Lair CD (High Five Records 1996)
- Full Circle CD (Cleopatra Records 2003)
- Locals Only: Live CD (Mystic 2005)
- Grind Kings CD (Lucky 13)

== Other sources ==
- last.fm
- All Music Guide, Loftus
- KPFR radio interview, July, 1995, Hickey, Pittman, Minnick, Taylor and Sear
- Hooligan Magazine, 1996 article: "Interview with Mark Hickey"
- PEAK radio interview 1995 by DJ Sam Stock with Hickey, Minnick
- Totalpunk web radio Negative Man information page
