= Christian Nesmith =

American musician (b. 1965)

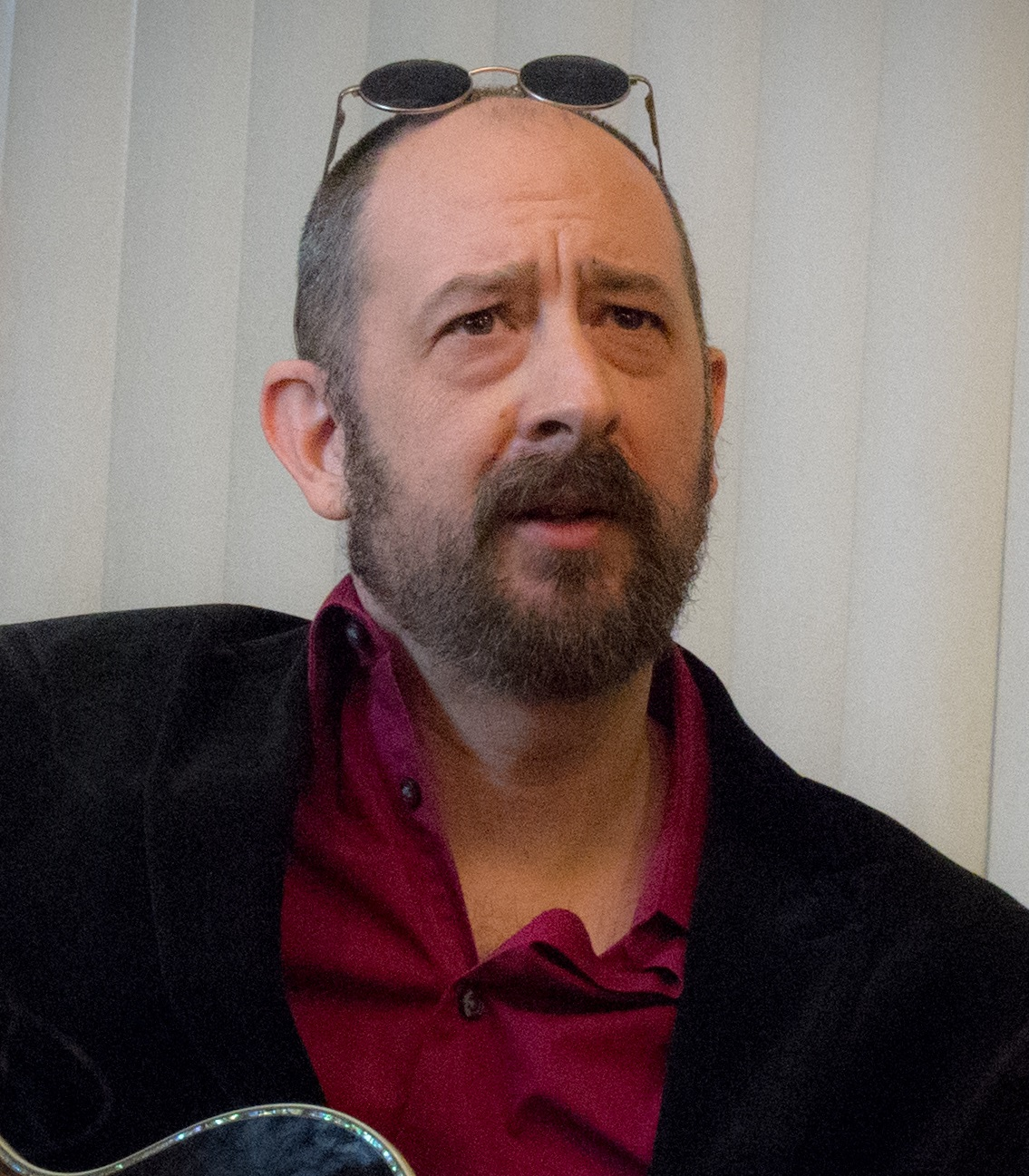
Nesmith in 2013

Christian DuVal Nesmith (born January 31, 1965) is an American musician from Los Angeles, California, and the eldest son of Michael Nesmith of the Monkees and Phyllis Gibson.

Nesmith has worked with his father (on the album The Garden), Michael Sherwood (on Tangletown, and in the band GLP), Ty Tabor (backing vocals on 2002's Safety) and Doug Pinnick of King's X (touring band from 1998), and formerly, Cindy Alexander. He played in the band Chodle's Trunk, with drummer Nick Menza of Megadeth and guitarist Anthony Gallo, as well as playing on a track for Menza's Life After Deth album.

He also co-writes, produces, and plays guitar on recordings for his wife, Americana musician Circe Link (Let's Go Together, 2003; One Drop of Poison, 2004; Live in Japan, 2006; Moody Girl, 2006; Vonnegut's Wife, 2011; California Kid, 2011; Dumb Luck, 2013; Bird's Amazing Odyssey & The Meaning of Tea, 2015; Cosmologica, 2021; Arcana, 2024).

In 2006, Nesmith released a solo album, An Axe to Grind, on Blackwings Multimedia.

In 2007, he was the musical director of Hair at The Met Theatre in Los Angeles, produced by Michael Butler and directed by Bo Crowell. The production won The Best Musical Award of 2007 from the LA Weekly.

He has also toured with Air Supply as a lead guitarist. Between 2012 and 2021, he toured with his father for the Monkees' reunion tours and contributed to the Monkees' Christmas album Christmas Party. Along with his brother Jonathan, and Circe Link, he is a member of a new lineup of The First National Band that has toured since 2018.

In 2021, he produced the album Dolenz Sings Nesmith, a collection of songs written by his father and performed by Micky Dolenz.

He resides in Los Angeles.
