= Liberal Animation =

Studio album by NOFX
- Released: 1988
- Recorded: January 9–11, 1988
- Studio: Westbeach Recorders
- Genre: Punk rock
- Length: 30:22
- Label: Wassail, Epitaph
- Producer: NOFX

NOFX chronology
The P.M.R.C. Can Suck on This (1987)	Liberal Animation (1988)	S&M Airlines (1989)

Professional ratings
Review scores
Source	Rating
AllMusic	1.5/5 stars

Liberal Animation is the debut studio album by the American punk rock band NOFX. It was originally released in 1988 through Wassail Records, which was Fat Mike's label before Fat Wreck Chords. Brett Gurewitz produced the record, and even offered to release it on his label, Epitaph Records. The band decided to self-release it instead. It was re-released through Epitaph Records in 1991 with all new artwork. The title is a spoonerism of "animal liberation" and the cover artwork is a reflection of that. Bassist/Singer, Fat Mike has stated many times that he thinks it's the worst NOFX album. He wrote the majority of the album on a guitar he bought from Lynn Strait of Snot. The track "Shut Up Already" features a short cover of the Led Zeppelin song "Black Dog". It is the only full-length album by NOFX to feature Dave Casillas on guitar. Amateur style music videos were made for the tracks "Shut Up Already" and "Mr. Jones."

== Track listing ==
All tracks are written by Fat Mike, except where noted.

No.	Title	Writer(s)	Notes	Length
1.	"Shut Up Already"	Fat Mike, Dave Casillas	contains an interpolation of Led Zeppelin’s “Black Dog”	2:44
2.	"Freedumb"			0:45
3.	"Here Comes the Neighborhood"	Fat Mike, Eric Melvin		2:58
4.	"A200 Club"			1:55
5.	"Sloppy English"			1:20
6.	"You Put Your Chocolate in My Peanut Butter"	Fat Mike, Melvin		2:31
7.	"Mr. Jones"	Fat Mike, Melvin, Casillas		3:18
8.	"Vegetarian Mumbo Jumbo"	Fat Mike, Melvin		3:32
9.	"Beer Bong"			2:30
10.	"Piece"			1:35
11.	"I Live in a Cake"	Fat Mike, Melvin		1:09
12.	"No Problems"			1:20
13.	"On the Rag"			1:42
14.	"Truck Stop Blues"	Melvin, Casillas		3:03
Total length:				29:33

== Personnel ==
Personnel taken from Liberal Animation liner notes.

NOFX

- Fat Mike – vocals, bass
- Eric Melvin – rhythm guitar, acoustic guitar
- Dave Cassillas – lead guitar
- Erik Sandin – drums

Additional personnel

- NOFX – production
- Brett Gurewitz – engineering
- Fat Mike – sleeve design
- Ryan Stevens – cover drawing
