= Los Cycos =

American crossover thrash band

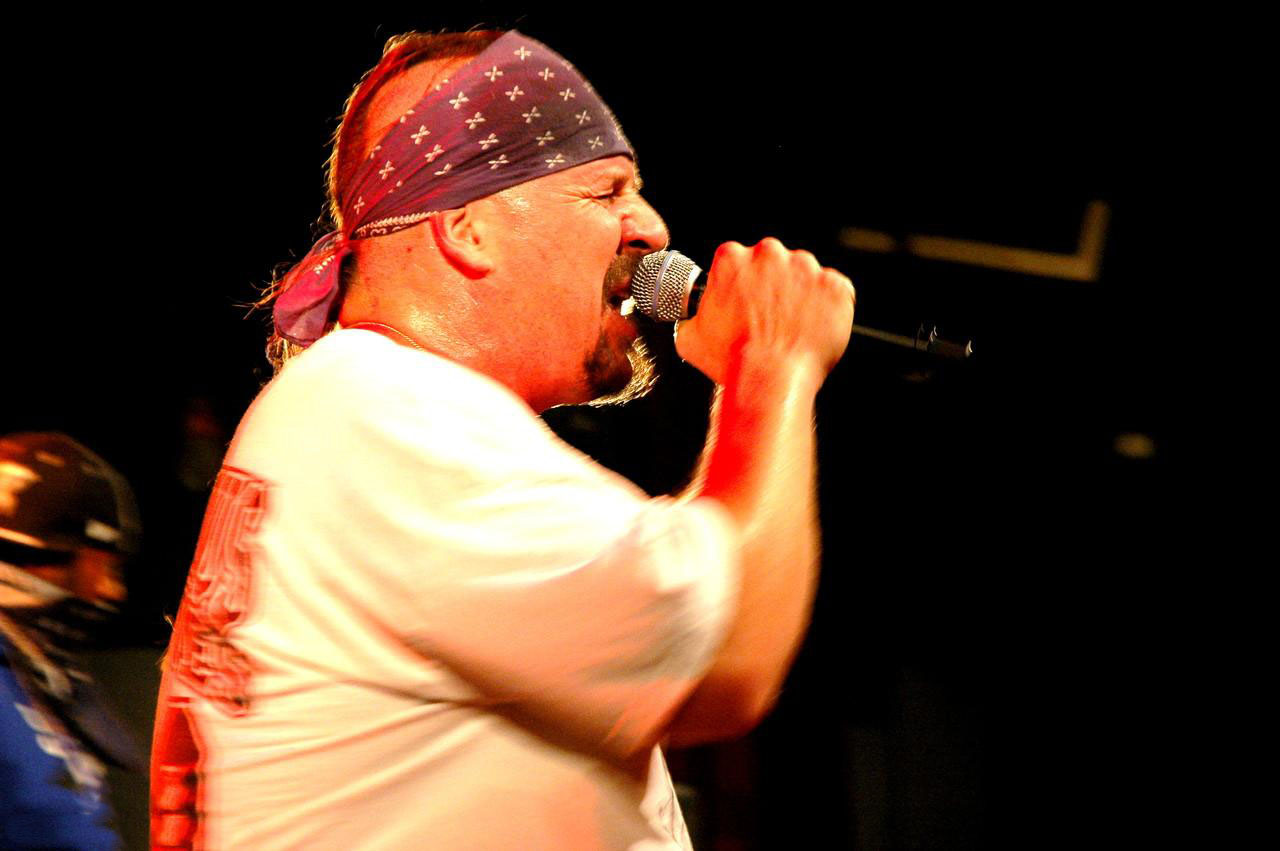
- Frontman Mike Muir in 2008

Background information
- Origin: Venice, Los Angeles, California, U.S.
- Genres: Crossover thrash
- Years active: 1984–1985
- Labels: Suicidal Records
- Past members: Mike Muir; Grant Estes; Louiche Mayorga; Amery Smith; Anthony Gallo; Sal Troy; Bob Heathcote

Los Cycos was an American crossover thrash band founded in 1984 in Venice, Los Angeles, California, by Suicidal Tendencies frontman Mike Muir. The only recording of the band appears on the rare 1985 release Welcome to Venice, the debut album and first release from Suicidal Records.

== History ==
Los Cycos formed in 1984. It was the brainchild of Suicidal Tendencies frontman Mike Muir. During the first year of the band's four-year recording hiatus, current guitarist Jon Nelson left the group to start his own band (the Brood) along with fellow drummer and bandmate Amery Smith. Suicidal was currently banned from playing Los Angeles shows (largely due to the violent nature of their audience) and Muir was about to try his hand at producing as well as starting the label Suicidal Records with bassist Louiche Mayorga.

Los Cycos was originally vocalist Mike Muir, bassist Bob Heathcote, Anthony Gallo guitarist and original Suicidal drummer Amery Smith. After a few rehearsals the line-up included Grant Estes on lead guitar, Gallo (rhythm), and original choices Bob Heathcote and Amery Smith were replaced by Louiche Mayorga (bass) and No Mercy's Sal Troy on (drums). Rehearsals continued in preparation for their debut recording on Muir's newly formed Suicidal Records. With the final line-up established and two songs "It's Not Easy" and "A Little Each Day", Los Cycos was born. "Welcome to Venice" was the first record to be released on Suicidal Records; the album also included local Venice bands Suicidal Tendencies, Beowülf, No Mercy and Excel. "Welcome to Venice" is a (split) album and was only released on vinyl and cassette, never to be digitized to compact disc because the original masters were lost in a fire. When it came time to record the tracks for WTV, drummer Sal Troy had his hands full recording for No Mercy and Los Cycos, as did Muir, whose vocals can be heard on the Suicidal Tendencies cut "Look Up...(The Boys are Back) and the Los Cycos track "It's Not Easy".

In 1986, Mike Muir signed and released Beowülf's first self-titled LP for Suicidal Records, and in 1987, he joined Venice pals "No Mercy" on their debut album "Widespread Bloodshed, love runs red". It would be Suicidal Records last until the label was resurrected in 1997. The re-forming record company had its first release in 10 years with the (split) "Friends & Family", a compilation of Suicidal tracks and selections from related Venice bands. In 1989, Suicidal Tendencies re-recorded "It's Not Easy" for their 1989 album Controlled by Hatred/Feel Like Shit... Déjà Vu. The other Los Cycos track "A Little Each Day" was also included in the 1987 Suicidal Tendencies release "Join the Army" and again on "Still Cyco After All These Years" released in 93. In 2000, it resurfaced on the "FNG" compilation and a fourth time on 2008's (split) album "Lights...Camera...Revolution!/Still Cyco After All These Years".

Mike Muir wrote the words, music and produced both Los Cycos tracks as well as the entire record. Since "Welcome to Venice" is out of print it is considered by record collectors to be a collector's item and is one of the most sought-after recordings from that Venice skate punk era. Though it was almost thirty years ago, Los Cycos and Suicidal still remain a heavily influential part of the American punk and skate culture, for music and style. Los Cycos disbanded in 1985.

In November 2004, Suicidal Tendencies posted on their official website rumors of a Los Cycos reunion and the release of "Return to Venice" a follow-up to 1985's "Welcome to Venice" featuring most of the previous bands. In 2003, Mike Muir had his first of two back surgeries for a ruptured, herniated disc, the other in 2005 is what thwarted that release as well as him having to cancel his Brazilian festival dates and any up and coming Suicidal shows.

Since "Return to Venice" never materialized and pressure from the fans two-year wait started to mount, bassist Louiche Mayorga decided to put out "Welcome 2 Venice" in 2006, 21 years after its 1985 predecessor "Welcome to Venice" and formed the band "AgainST" just for the occasion. He recruited singer-songwriter Dan Clements (Excel founding member and frontman) and original Suicidal Tendencies/Los Cycos members; Grant Estes, Amery Smith and the former No Mercy vocalist Kevin Guercio. These recordings and the release and distribution was handled by Mayorga's independent label "Built on an Ounce".

== Band members ==
- Mike Muir – vocals*
- Louiche Mayorga – bass*
- Amery Smith – drums
- Grant Estes – guitars*
- Bob Heathcote – bass
- Anthony Gallo – guitars
- Sal Troy – drums*

* Played on the track "It's Not Easy" – Welcome to Venice

== Discography ==
| Title | Release | Label | Band |
|---|---|---|---|
| Welcome to Venice | 1984 | Suicidal | Suicidal Tendencies/Los Cycos |
