= The P.M.R.C. Can Suck on This =

EP by NOFX
- Released: 1987; January 1, 1990 (reissue)
- Recorded: 1987, Santa Barbara, California
- Genre: Punk rock, hardcore punk
- Length: 9:40
- Label: Wassail, Fat Wreck Chords
- Producer: NOFX

NOFX chronology
So What If We're on Mystic! (1986)	The P.M.R.C. Can Suck on This (1987)	Liberal Animation (1988)

Alternative cover
- Cover of the re-release

Professional ratings
Review scores
Source	Rating
Allmusic	3/5 stars

The P.M.R.C. Can Suck on This is an EP by the American punk rock band NOFX. It was originally released in 1987 through Wassail Records with hand-written labels (limited to 500 copies) and was re-released on January 1, 1990, through Fat Wreck Chords. The original version of the EP featured a black-and-white photo montage of Tammy Faye Bakker pegging then-husband (and televangelist) Jim Bakker as its cover, but was eventually changed to a picture of guitarist Eric Melvin playing on stage. The track "Shut Up Already" borrows a riff from the Led Zeppelin song "Living Loving Maid", while the Liberal Animation version ended with a riff from "Black Dog". All the tracks were compiled on the Longest EP compilation as tracks 26-30 respectively, where Johnny B. Goode appears at the end of "The Punk Song".

== Track listing ==
=== Side A ===
1. "Dueling Retards" (previously unreleased) (0:15)
2. "On the Rag" (slightly different from the Liberal Animation version, lower quality recording) (1:51)
3. "A200 Club" (slightly different from the Liberal Animation version, with extra lyrics) (2:00)

=== Side B ===
1. "Shut Up Already" (slightly different from the Liberal Animation version) (2:26)
2. "The Punk Song" (previously unreleased) (1:06)
3. "Johnny B. Goode" (originally performed by Chuck Berry) (2:02)

== Personnel ==
- Fat Mike – vocals, bass
- Eric Melvin – guitar
- Dave Cassilas – guitar
- Erik Sandin – drums
