= Me and Those Dreamin' Eyes of Mine =

1996 single by D'Angelo

Single by D'Angelo

from the album Brown Sugar
- Released: 1996
- Recorded: 1994–1995
- Genre: Neo soul; R&B; soul; funk
- Length: 4:46
- Label: EMI
- Songwriter: Michael Archer
- Producers: D'Angelo; Bob Power

D'Angelo singles chronology
"Lady" (1996)	"Me and Those Dreamin' Eyes of Mine" (1996)	"Your Precious Love" (1996)

Music video
- "Me and Those Dreamin' Eyes of Mine" on YouTube

"Me and Those Dreamin' Eyes of Mine" is a song by American singer and songwriter D'Angelo and the fourth single from his debut studio album, Brown Sugar (1995). It was produced by D'Angelo himself and Bob Power.

== Composition ==
"Me and Those Dreamin' Eyes of Mine" is an R&B, soul and funk song. Lyrically, D'Angelo describes being captivated by a woman and wondering if his emotions are keeping him from seeing the truth about their relationship, in a serious tone.

== Critical reception ==
James Hunter of Vibe wrote that the song "begins with sweet gospel colors and relies on a bracing wash of vocal harmonies. But it's the rhythmic flow—the quickness of the voices against the bass lines—that turn the piece into serious funk-soul." Cheo Hodari Coker of Rolling Stone considered it one of the "centerpiece efforts" from Brown Sugar, which "prove that there is some mettle behind D'Angelo's retrograde stylistics." Ann Powers of Spin commented that the song evokes the "exquisite tension of early Prince and late Marvin Gaye."

== Remixes ==
The song was remixed by J Dilla and Def Squad. The latter remix features American rapper Redman.

== Charts ==
Chart (1996)	Peak position
US Billboard Hot 100	74
US Hot R&B/Hip-Hop Songs (Billboard)	25
US Cash Box Top 100	66
