= Valley Arts Guitars =

American electric guitar manufacturer

- Company type: Private
- Industry: Musical instruments
- Founded: 1975
- Founder: Mike McGuire and Al Carness
- Defunct: 1999; 27 years ago
- Fate: Brand name acquired by Gibson
- Headquarters: North Hollywood, Los Angeles, United States
- Area served: Worldwide
- Products: Electric guitars
- Parent: Gibson (since 2002)

Valley Arts Guitars was an American electric guitar manufacturer. The company was taken over by Samick in mid-1993, and sold to Gibson in 2002, which used the brand "Valley Arts" to name guitar stores.

== History ==
Mike McGuire and Al Carness founded the company in the mid-1970s in North Hollywood, California, a district of Los Angeles, California in the San Fernando Valley; the name "Valley Arts" is a reference to the firm's original location. Partners in a music store and repair shop, their repairs and customizations gained the attention of Los Angeles studio musicians and jazz guitarists such as Lee Ritenour, Steve Lukather, Tommy Tedesco and Larry Carlton. They began building custom guitars from scratch in 1977, and by 1983 demand for these guitars had increased to the point of requiring a separate manufacturing facility. Most of their guitars had a radical styling similar to that of a superstrat; others were modified versions of Fender's popular designs, the Stratocaster and the Telecaster. "Signature" Valley Arts features often included highly figured wood grain on the front, translucent colored finishes, gold hardware, Floyd Rose locking tremolos, EMG and Seymour Duncan humbucking pickups.

In late 1990 the store was destroyed by fire. Underinsured, McGuire and Carness found it necessary to sell the store and concentrate on the manufacturing side of the business. In an attempt to expand their business, in 1992 they sold half of Valley Arts to the Korean guitar manufacturer Samick. One year after, Samick bought the whole company. McGuire and Carness became dissatisfied with their positions in the company and the quality of the guitars manufactured by Samick, and by 1993 they had moved to positions at Gibson.

Through the 1990s Gibson was moving to expand and diversify its brands, and by the late 1990s they had decided to acquire the "Valley Arts" name as an outgrowth of the Gibson Custom Shop. In late 2002 Valley Arts reopened as a music store, repair facility and small manufacturer specializing in custom guitars in downtown Nashville. Al Carness managed the store; Mike McGuire became operations manager of the Gibson Custom division, which oversees the Valley Arts line of guitars. The Nashville store closed in 2005. Mike McGuire officially retired August 3, 2012.
