= Lady (D'Angelo song) =

1996 single by D'Angelo

Single by D'Angelo

from the album Brown Sugar
- Released: March 5, 1996
- Recorded: 1995
- Genre: R&B; neo soul
- Length: 5:45 (album version); 4:05 (single edit)
- Label: EMI
- Songwriters: D'Angelo; Raphael Saadiq
- Producers: D'Angelo; Raphael Saadiq

D'Angelo singles chronology
"Cruisin'" (1995)	"Lady" (1996)	"Me and Those Dreamin' Eyes of Mine" (1996)

Music video
- "Lady" on YouTube

"Lady" is a song co-written, co-produced and performed by American neo soul singer D'Angelo, issued as the third single from his debut studio album, Brown Sugar (1995). A remixed version of the song (titled the Clean Street Version) was also released, featuring vocals from American hip hop musician AZ. Separate music videos were created for both versions of the song.

"Lady" is D'Angelo's biggest hit single to date in the United States, peaking at No. 10 on the Billboard Hot 100 in 1996. It was certified gold by the RIAA on June 4, 1996. The song was also nominated for a Grammy Award for Best Male R&B Vocal Performance in 1997, but lost to "Your Secret Love" by Luther Vandross.

Canadian rapper Drake heavily sampled the song for the closing track "March 14" off of his 2018 album Scorpion. In 2023, Singer Eric Bellinger also sampled the song for his single "Curious" featuring rappers Fabolous and Cordae.

== Critical reception ==
Larry Flick from Billboard magazine wrote, "As 'Cruisin'' continues to attract popsters, D'Angelo—one of the most bold and interesting new artists in R&B—serves his core soul audience this sultry, percussive slow jam from his sterling album Brown Sugar. As with past singles, the emphasis here is on sharp musicianship and adventurous songwriting. D'Angelo's street Romeo vocal style is put to excellent use with this tune's simple, effective you're my lady refrain, as well as the limber bass/guitar interplay. After being heralded by R&B radio, this should prove to be D'Angelo's biggest pop hit so far." Ann Powers from Spin described it as "sexy-paranoid", saying that songs like "Lady" "get serious with soul's erotic undercurrents, reaching for the exquisite tension of early Prince and late Marvin Gaye."

== Music videos ==
The official music video for the original version of the song was directed by Hype Williams, and shot in the singer’s hometown of Richmond, Virginia. The video for the remix version was directed by Brett Ratner. In addition to AZ, the remix video features appearances from singers Faith Evans and Joi; as well as Erykah Badu in her first music video appearance.

== Charts ==
=== Weekly charts ===
Chart (1996)	Peak position
Australia (ARIA)	121
New Zealand (Recorded Music NZ)	15
Scottish Singles Sales (Official Charts)	56
UK Singles (Official Charts)	21
UK Dance (Official Charts)	8
UK Hip Hop/R&B (Official Charts)	3
US Billboard Hot 100	10
US Dance Singles Sales (Billboard)	7
US Hot R&B/Hip-Hop Songs (Billboard)	2
US Rhythmic Airplay (Billboard)	10
US Cash Box Top 100	8

Chart (2025)	Peak position
Japan Hot Overseas (Billboard Japan)	15

=== Year-end charts ===
Chart (1996)	Position
US Billboard Hot 100	70

== Certifications ==
Region	Certification	Certified units/sales
New Zealand (RMNZ)	Gold	15,000^{‡}
United States (RIAA)	Gold	500,000^{^}
^{^} Shipments figures based on certification alone.^{‡} Sales+streaming figures based on certification alone.
