= Brown Sugar (D'Angelo song) =

Single by D'Angelo

from the album Brown Sugar
- Released: June 13, 1995
- Recorded: 1994
- Genre: R&B; neo soul
- Length: 4:22
- Label: Cooltempo
- Songwriters: D'Angelo; Ali Shaheed Muhammad
- Producers: D'Angelo; Ali Shaheed Muhammad

D'Angelo singles chronology
"Brown Sugar" (1995)	"Cruisin'" (1995)

Music video
- "Brown Sugar" on YouTube

"Brown Sugar" is the debut single by American recording artist D'Angelo, taken from his debut album of the same name (1995). The song was released as the album's lead single in June 1995, through the Cooltempo label. It was written and produced by D'Angelo and frequent collaborator Ali Shaheed Muhammad. The song received critical acclaim by music critics, and peaked at number 27 on the US Billboard Hot 100 and number 24 on the UK Singles Chart. The accompanying music video was directed by American film director and producer Brett Ratner, and features D'Angelo performing the song in a nightclub.

== Composition ==
Opened by falsetto ad-libs, an organ refrain and pulsating bass lines, the title track "Brown Sugar" features a dark, thick texture and a gutbucket-jazz style and rhythm. The instrumentation throughout the song, highlighted by Jimmy Smith-style organ work, atmospheric percussion and snapping snare drums, has been described by music writers as "organic". The song's sound is also similar to the work of funk, soul and jazz musician Roy Ayers, while D'Angelo's soulful tenor-delivery throughout the song's verses is stylistically similar to the flow of most emcees at the time.

Misinterpreted as a traditional love song about a femme fatale by most R&B audiences, "Brown Sugar" is actually an ode to marijuana use through its use of the personification of a brown-skinned woman. This thematic substitution is a conventional lyrical technique in hip hop. Music journalist Peter Shapiro wrote of the song's lyrical content, stating "D'Angelo was extolling the pleasures of pot-fuelled solipsism ('Always down for a ménage à trois/But I think I'ma hit it solo/Hope my niggaz don't mind') and intimating that love, or at least love of the herb, leads to insanity ('Brown sugar babe/I gets high off you love/Don't know how to behave')." Writer and academic Todd Boyd compared the song, along with Dr. Dre's The Chronic (1992) and Styles P's "Good Times" (2002), to Rick James's "Mary Jane" (1978), stating that the song "celebrated his love for gettin' blazed and spawned ... a truly large following."

== Critical reception ==
Gil Robertson IV from Cash Box named 'Brown Sugar' a standout track of the album, saying, "It blends the right mix of down home slow groove funk with a caressing jazz texture that's bound to get folks out on the dance floor. Produced by Ali from A Tribe Called Quest, this track is loaded with a classic old school led and provides a great introduction for this promising young talent." Pan-European magazine Music & Media wrote, "Don't expect a Stones cover, D'Angelo provides us with original material in a jazzy hip hop vein. Bass and drums are lazy, while the Georgie Fame-like organ adds a touch of class." Dele Fadele from NME commented, "On this occasion, he relaxes over a mid-tempo late-nite groove with an ode to a mysterious 'Brown Sugar' who doesn't mind being caught up in a ménage-à-trois. Which is the same thing as saying D'Angelo rates Marvin Gaye's perverse period highly, if not Prince, who he self-consciously tries to stay away from. Soon to be darling of the chi-chi set." Ann Powers from Spin described it as "softcore", remarking that songs like 'Brown Sugar' "get serious with soul's erotic undercurrents, reaching for the exquisite tension of early Prince and late Marvin Gaye."

== Credits ==
- Written by D'Angelo and Ali Shaheed Muhammad
- Produced by D'Angelo and Ali Shaheed Muhammad
- Vocal arrangements by D'Angelo
  All vocals by D'Angelo
- Musical arrangements by D'Angelo
- All instruments by D'Angelo
- Drum programming by Ali Shaheed Muhammad
- Recorded at Battery Studios, NYC
- Additional engineering by Tim Latham at Soundtrack, NYC
- Mixed by Bob Power at Battery Studios, NYC
- Assistant engineer: G-Spot

== Charts ==
=== Weekly charts ===
Chart (1995)	Peak position
Australia (ARIA)	167
Netherlands (Dutch Top 40)	34
Netherlands (Single Top 100)	31
Scotland Singles (OCC)	75
UK Singles (OCC)	24
UK Dance (OCC)	10
UK Hip Hop/R&B (OCC)	5
US Billboard Hot 100	27
US Dance Singles Sales (Billboard)	14
US Hot R&B/Hip-Hop Songs (Billboard)	5
US Rhythmic Airplay (Billboard)	26
US Cash Box Top 100	19

Chart (2025)	Peak position
Japan Hot Overseas (Billboard Japan)	13

=== Year-end charts ===
Chart (1995)	Position
US Billboard Hot 100	86

== Certifications ==
Region	Certification	Certified units/sales
New Zealand (RMNZ)	Gold	15,000^{‡}
^{‡} Sales+streaming figures based on certification alone.
