= Lost My Head... But I'm Back on the Right Track =

Studio album by Beowülf
- Released: 1988
- Recorded: 1987–1988
- Genre: Hardcore punk Crossover thrash
- Length: 39:25
- Label: Caroline Records

Beowülf chronology
Beowülf (1986)	Lost My Head... But I'm Back on the Right Track (1988)	Un-Sentimental (1993)

Professional ratings
Review scores
Source	Rating
Allmusic	1.5/5 stars

Lost My Head... But I'm Back on the Right Track is the second album by Beowülf, released in 1988.

Like the previous album, Beowülf, Lost My Head is regarded by fans as Beowülf's best album, and a classic from the golden age of the Venice, California scene. Lost My Head was also Beowülf's last album recorded with the "classic" line-up of Dale Henderson (vocals), Mike Jensen (guitar), Paul Yamada (bass) and Michael Alvarado (drums). Henderson would become the only remaining original member of the band while recording their next album, 1993's Un-Sentimental.

Like many Beowülf albums, the recording is out of print. In 2004, the album was re-released as the second half of The Re-Releases compilation, along with Beowülf.

== Track listing ==
1. "Muy Bonita" (2:35)
2. "Flare" (2:34)
3. "Plastic People" (3:17)
4. "Fuzzy Princess" (3:32)
5. "Hippy Liquor" (3:37)
6. "One Chance" (3:35)
7. "Done Got Caught" (2:14)
8. "You Get Me Off" (2:43)
9. "Winer Diner" (3:14)
10. "Where You From" (3:50)
11. "Lost My Head" (3:25)
12. "Cruisin'" (Smokey Robinson cover) (4:49)

== Credits ==
- Dale Henderson - vocals and guitar
- Mike Jensen - guitar
- Paul Yamada - bass
- Michael Alvarado - drums
