= Jaared =

American jazz saxophonist

- Jaared performing in London, 2010

Background information
- Born: January 20, 1967 (age 58)
- Origin: Washington, D.C., U.S.
- Genres: Contemporary jazz
- Occupation(s): Musician, instrumentalist
- Instrument: Saxophone
- Years active: 1994–present
- Labels: Trippin'N'Rhythm
- Website: jaared.com

Jaared (pronounced "Jared"; born Ralph Jaared Arosemena, January 20, 1967) is an American contemporary jazz saxophonist based in Washington, D.C. In 2002, he was nominated the Best New Artist of the Year for 2002 by The National Smooth Jazz Association

Jaared suffered from asthma as a child, and almost died on from the chronic lung disease. His doctor told his family that learning to play a wind instrument would strengthen his lungs, and Jaared chose the Alto Sax.

Jaared tours with a famous British contemporary jazz guitarist Peter White. Jaared is a regular guest on the Jimi King show, which airs EST 12- 2 pm on Sundays.

== Discography ==
=== Albums ===
- Foreword – 2001 (Label: Lightyear)
- Hangtime – 2002 (Label: Lightyear)
- Addiction – 2008 (Label: Trippin 'n' Rhythm)
- Manhattan Nights – 2010 (Label: Trippin 'n' Rhythm)
