= Beowülf (album) =

Studio album by Beowülf
- Released: 1986
- Recorded: 1986
- Genre: Hardcore punk Crossover thrash
- Length: 35:31
- Label: Suicidal Records

Beowülf chronology
Welcome to Venice (1985)	Beowülf (1986)	Lost My Head... But I'm Back on the Right Track (1988)

Professional ratings
Review scores
Source	Rating
Allmusic	2.5/5 stars

Beowülf is the debut album by the band of the same name, released in 1986. The album's title is a reference to the Norse saga hero of the iconic epic poem in Anglo-Saxon literature.

Like many Beowülf albums, the recording is out of print. In 2004, the album was re-released as the first half of the Re-Releases compilation, along with its follow-up Lost My Head... But I'm Back on the Right Track.

== Track listing ==
1. "Took the Jewel" (2:35)
2. "No Doubt" (2:47)
3. "Drink, Fight, Fuck" (1:48)
4. "All I Need" (2:41)
5. "Shoot Them Down" (2:15)
6. "Taste the Steel (Extended Fight Version)" (4:02)
7. "Phuck" (3:16)
8. "Get the Grind" (3:17)
9. "Americanizm" (1:51)
10. "Down 'Til Dead" (3:07)
11. "Belligerence" (1:27)
12. "Don't Give a Damn" (3:16)
13. "(My Life) Alcohol" (3:03)

== Credits ==
- Dale Henderson - vocals and guitar
- Mike Jensen - guitar
- Paul Yamada - bass
- Michael Alvarado - drums
