= Beowülf =

American crossover thrash metal band

- Also known as: Black Sheep, BWF
- Origin: Venice, California, U.S.
- Genres: Crossover thrash; hardcore punk; alternative metal; skate punk
- Years active: 1981–1995, 2000–present
- Labels: Suicidal; Caroline; Restless; I Scream; Corruption
- Members: Stephen Crapia; Brian Fortenberry; Abimael Cruz
- Past members: Dale Henderson; Mike Jensen; Clint Schuyler; Buckit; Gimmi; Paul Yamada; Kevin Sullivan; Dug Mug Swanson; Sean Otero; Louiche Mayorga; Roger DeGiacomi; Michael Alvarado; Denish Chaudhuri; Mark Conway; Christian Olde Wolbers; Rich Rowan; Thad Coleman
- Website: beowulfbwf.com

Beowülf is an American crossover thrash metal band formed in Venice Beach, California, in 1981 by Michael Alvarado, Dale Henderson, Mike Jensen and Paul Yamada. The group never gained a large mainstream success, but is considered one of the first bands that defined the "Venice Scene" in the 1980s, along with Suicidal Tendencies, Los Cycos, Neighborhood Watch, No Mercy, Excel and Uncle Slam, who all played a mix of skate punk, hardcore, heavy metal and thrash.

As of 2011, Beowülf has released six studio albums. They split up in 1995, but reformed in 2000. The band has had numerous line-up changes and Henderson has been the only constant member. Their classic line-up is Henderson (vocals), Mike Jensen (guitar), Paul Yamada (bass) and Michael Alvarado (drums).

== History ==
=== Early years (1981–1984) ===
The band started in 1981 as Black Sheep with Dale Henderson on vocals and guitar, former Neighborhood Watch guitar player Mike Jensen on guitar, Paul Tsutomu Yamada on bass and Mike Jensen's cousin, Roger DeGiacomi, on drums. The band played many parties, bars and clubs in Venice in 1981–1982 before DeGiacomi became the band manager and was replaced by Michael Alvarado on drums in 1983, changing the name of the band to Beowülf, (a reference to the Norse saga hero of the iconic epic poem in Anglo-Saxon literature) or BWF (The F being inverted) as they wrote it in Venice "graffiti slang".

=== The "classic" line-up-era (1985–1989) ===
In 1985, they were signed to Mike Muir's Suicidal Records and recorded two tracks, "Taste the Steel" and "Unicorn", for the legendary Welcome to Venice compilation. In 1986, they also recorded their first self-titled LP, which was released on Suicidal Records and featured their trademark sound that was a cross between Suicidal Tendencies and Motörhead, Dale Henderson's vocals sounding a lot like Lemmy's.

This record had them noticed by Caroline Records, where they followed Suicidal Tendencies and Excel. They recorded their second album, Lost My Head... But I'm Back on the Right Track, which was released in 1988 on Caroline which featured the same line-up and was in the same vein as their first.

=== Later years (1990–1995) ===
Around the beginning of the 1990s, conflicts reported arose between the band members and they separated. Dale Henderson kept the Beowülf name and hired Clint Schuyler to play guitar, Kevin Sullivan to play bass and Rich Rowan to play drums and he recorded Un-Sentimental, which was released in 1993 on Restless Records with that line-up.

Un-Sentimental was way less appreciated than the band's first two efforts, notably because there was only one original member in the band and the sound had changed a bit, drifting more to bluesy rock and going away from the hardcore thrash of their beginning.

In 1994 the band line-up underwent changes before recording the band's fourth album in Seattle for Restless Records and hired Buckit to play guitar, childhood friend and former EVOL bassist Dug Mug Swanson and Denish Chaudhuri to play drums. They released 2 Cents in 1995, toured Europe, Japan and had a song in the cult film Tank Girl. Tank Girl director Rachel Talalay also did the band's video for the song "2 Cents".

=== Post-break up (1996–1999) ===
In 1995, original bass player Paul Yamada died of a drug overdose and that had an effect on Dale Henderson, who decided he was over with Beowülf. He concentrated on another project, the band Kool-Whip. He called back Rowan and Sullivan (from the Un-Sentimental line-up) and added Gimmi on second guitar and the new band had a more hard rock sound. They played clubs and released two albums The Now, which was nominated for best rock album at the 2002 L.A. Music Awards, and Dirty Movie in 2007.

=== Reunion (2000–present) ===
Despite Kool-Whip's apparent success, Dale Henderson, purportedly struck with nostalgia and ready to play the old Beowülf songs again, the band returned to the name Beowülf and started touring again playing the Beowülf music, keeping the same personnel. They also re-released the first two LPs as one CD called The Re-Releases in 2004 on I Scream Records with one new track recorded in 2004.

They started working on a new record, their second for I Scream, in 2005 while relentlessly touring Europe. Titled Westminster & 5th, it was released in April 2007 and featured Henderson, Rowan, Sullivan and former Strain 999 guitar player Stephen Crapia on guitar.

Beowülf released their sixth studio album, Jesus Freak, in the summer of 2011. It was produced by frontman Dale Henderson and former Fear Factory guitarist/bassist Christian Olde Wolbers. They also announced that bassist Sean Otero had left Beowülf and was briefly replaced by former Suicidal Tendencies bassist Louiche Mayorga.

As of September 2011, according to Beowülf's official website, Mayorga is no longer in the band and his replacement is former Fear Factory member Christian Olde Wolbers. In 2015, Neighborhood Watch guitarist Mark Conway joined the band replacing Stephen Crapia. In 2016 guitarist Mark Conway was replaced by original Beowulf member Mike Jensen. In 2019 bass player Christian Olde Wolbers was replaced by Thad Coleman.

Mike Jensen died from an apparent heroin overdose on February 13, 2020 and was replaced by former Strain 999 and Beowulf member Stephen Crapia. In 2021 bass player Thad Coleman was replaced by former Strain 999 and Neighborhood Watch bass player Brian Fortenberry.

In 2022 drummer Rich Rowan was replaced by Abimael Cruz.

Beowulf will release their seventh studio album titled “The Blood Iz on Your Handz”, set for release in 2025, engineered and produced by Billy Graziadei from the New York hardcore band Biohazard, recorded at Firewater studios in Los Angeles, California. It will be their final album with Dale Henderson due to his death on May 13, 2025, at the age of 59, leaving the future of the band unknown.

== Personnel ==
=== Current members ===
- Brian Fortenberry – bass
- Abimael Cruz – drums
- Stephen Crapia – guitar

=== Former members ===
- Dale Henderson - lead vocals, guitar (1981-1995, 2000-2025; died 2025)
- Christopher "Wildebeest" Massey – guitar (1981)
- Mike Jensen – guitar (1981–1991; died 2020)
- Clint Schuyler – guitar (1991–1994; died 2008)
- Buckit – guitar (1994–1995)
- Gimmi – guitar (2000–2006)
- Stephen Crapia – guitar (2007–2010)
- Paul Yamada – bass (1981–1991; died 1995)
- Kevin Sullivan – bass (1991–1994)
- Dug Mug Swanson – bass (1994–1995)
- Sean Otero – bass (2000–2010)
- Louiche Mayorga – bass (2010–2011)
- Roger DeGiacomi – drums (1981–1983)
- Michael Alvarado – drums (1983–1991)
- Denish Chaudhuri – drums (1994–1995)
- Rich Rowen – drums
- Mark Conway - Guitar (2015-2016)
- Christian Olde Wolbers – bass (2011-2019)
- Thad Coleman – bass (2019-2021)

== Discography ==
=== Albums and EPs ===
Year	Title	Notes
1986	Beowülf	Debut album
1988	Lost My Head... But I'm Back on the Right Track	Last album recorded with the classic line-up
1993	Un-Sentimental	First album on Restless and also with Dale as the only constant member
1995	2 Cents	Second album on Restless and last studio album before disbanding
2007	Westminster & 5th	First studio album since the reunion
2011	Jesus Freak	Second studio album since the reunion
2025	”The Blood Iz On Your Handz”	7th studio album

=== Compilations ===
- Welcome to Venice (1985)
- Thrasher Magazine Skate Rock Vol. 5 (1987)
- Thrasher Magazine Skate Rock Vol. 9 Pawns of the Apocalypse (1990)
- Beowulf / Right Direction -Split- (1994)
- Respect Your Roots (2001)
- The Re-Releases (2004)
- Farewell to Venice (2006)
- Welcome 2 Venice (2007)
- “Ain’t No Place” (2021)
