= Ten Years of Fuckin' Up =

Video by NOFX
- Released: November 8, 1994
- Genre: Punk rock
- Label: Fat Wreck Chords

Ten Years of Fuckin' Up (FAT590) is a VHS video of NOFX released November 8, 1994 and re-released October 7, 2003 on DVD. The video included 19 live tracks of performance. The DVD version feature NOFX's commentary plus the Vandals's commentary on NOFX's commentary, as well as the instrumental version of the song "Glass War" playing over the title menu.

A video for the track, "Mr Jones" was included as an extra in the VHS release. It was a video similar to "Shut Up Already".

== Track listing ==
1. "Stickin In My Eye"
2. "Johnny B. Goode"
3. "Green Corn"
4. "Shut Up Already"
5. "Shower Days"
6. "GonoHerpaSyphlAids"
7. "Straight Edge"
8. "S/M Airlines"
9. "Six Pack Girls"
10. "The Longest Line"
11. "Buggley Eyes"
12. "Beer Bong"
13. "Leave it Alone"
14. "Jaundiced Eye"
15. "Johnny Appleseed"
16. "Moron Brothers"
17. "Iron Man"
18. "Bob"
19. "Kill all the White Man"
