= Mystic Records =

American record label and music company

Mystic Records is an American record label and music production company specializing in hardcore punk, crossover thrash, underground music, vintage and cult records. It is owned and operated by Doug Moody. The label was first established in Hollywood, California, and subsequently moved its operations to Oceanside, California. Mystic Records is an independent label and is a member of the Recording Industry Association of America (RIAA).

== History ==
=== Background ===
Mystic Records is closely associated with the personality of its founder, Doug Moody, regarded as a pioneer of the independent rock and roll industry. Moody's father, Walter Moody, was himself an influential figure in the music industry, running EMI Studios (Abbey Road Studios) in London during the 1930s. In 1953 the family moved to the United States.

Moody decided to himself become involved in the music business, first working in the A&R department of Silvertone Records in New Jersey. A series of music industry jobs followed throughout the decades of the 1960s and 1970s, including stints in various capacities at Kama Sutra Records, 20th Century Fox, and A&M Records.

=== Studio and label ===
Seeking another place in the music industry outside of the major record labels, Moody opened a recording studio in Hollywood, California, at the location of the old Mustang Studios, made famous as a facility used by the Bobby Fuller Four. Moody changed out the studio's superannuated 2 track mono recording gear and replaced it with state of the art 8-track stereo gear, leaving the recording rooms otherwise largely unaltered.

In tandem with the studio was launched the Mystic Records label. During the label's peak period of activity, from 1982 through 1990, Mystic released over 200 records, many of which were multi-band compilations, involving the work of several hundred artists. Emerging as a prominent force in the Southern California punk rock music scene, Mystic put out an array of alternative bands, with an emphasis on the hardcore punk, crossover thrash, and speed metal styles in vogue during this period.

Moody claimed to have invested $70,000 in the label in 1983 alone, but taking into account recording costs and sales figures averaging about 2,000 copies per record, found the operation with about $40,000 left to recover at the end of that year. Bands would purchase studio time, with Mystic recouping its investment against royalties due, which in 1984 Moody claimed was approximately 40 cents per record.

In conjunction with the label, Moody and Mystic established its own wholesale record distribution branch, MD Distributing. This distributorship handled not only Mystic releases but those of other labels as well.

=== Bands ===
Some of the best known artists on Mystic Records include NOFX, RKL, Battalion of Saints, Ill Repute, Bleed, Agression, and the Mentors. Mystic Records has also released vinyl compilations featuring Suicidal Tendencies, Love Canal, New Regime, Black Flag, False Alarm, Duct Tape Hostage, SIN 34, Government Issue, the Minutemen, Burning Image, Habeas Corpus, and Bad Religion.

=== Importance ===
Mystic Records has been credited with several innovations in the independent record industry of the 1980s. It introduced Super Sevens (7-inch 33 rpm extended play records featuring seven songs) and helped popularize the manufacture of limited edition records on colored vinyl. One of the most interesting releases was from a band named the Sharks (later Shark Island): a custom shaped single that had three outer edge "shark fins", which when inserted into the sleeve appeared to cut through the water. The label was also influential through its release of multi-band compilation albums, such as its "The Sound of Hollywood" series, and promotional label samplers making use of album tracks, typified by its "Mystic Sampler" series.

Additionally, Moody worked to define new genres of music such as "METALCORE," which he described in a 1984 press release as "a mixture of hardcore, fast paced thrash music with double drumming & Heavy Metal screaming guitars."

Moody's key collaborators on the Mystic Records project included producer and engineer Phillip "Philco" Raves, sales and distribution Randy Boyd of Cobraside Distribution, promotion director Mark Wilkins, and Candace D'Andrea who is Chief Operating Officer.

== Selected artists ==
- Agression
- America's Hardcore
- Battalion of Saints
- Bleed
- Bleach Party, USA
- The Conservatives
- Crankshaft
- Doggy Style
- Dr. Know
- Duct Tape Hostage
- Fatal Error
- Fornicators
- First Offense
- The Grim
- Ill Repute
- Insolent
- Killroy
- Manic Subsidal
- Manifest Destiny
- Meatwagon
- The Mentors
- New Regime
- NOFX
- The P.T.L. Klub
- Rabid Fetus
- Rich Kids on LSD
- RUNOFF
- Sado-Nation
- Scared Straight
- Screaming Bloody Marys
- SIN 34
- Slaughterhouse 5
- Social Spit
- Stäläg 13
- Standard Issue
- Suicidal Tendencies
- Teacherz
- The Shades
- Stukas Over Bedrock
- Undercity Kings
- Zoo

== See also ==
- List of record labels
