= No Use for a Name discography =

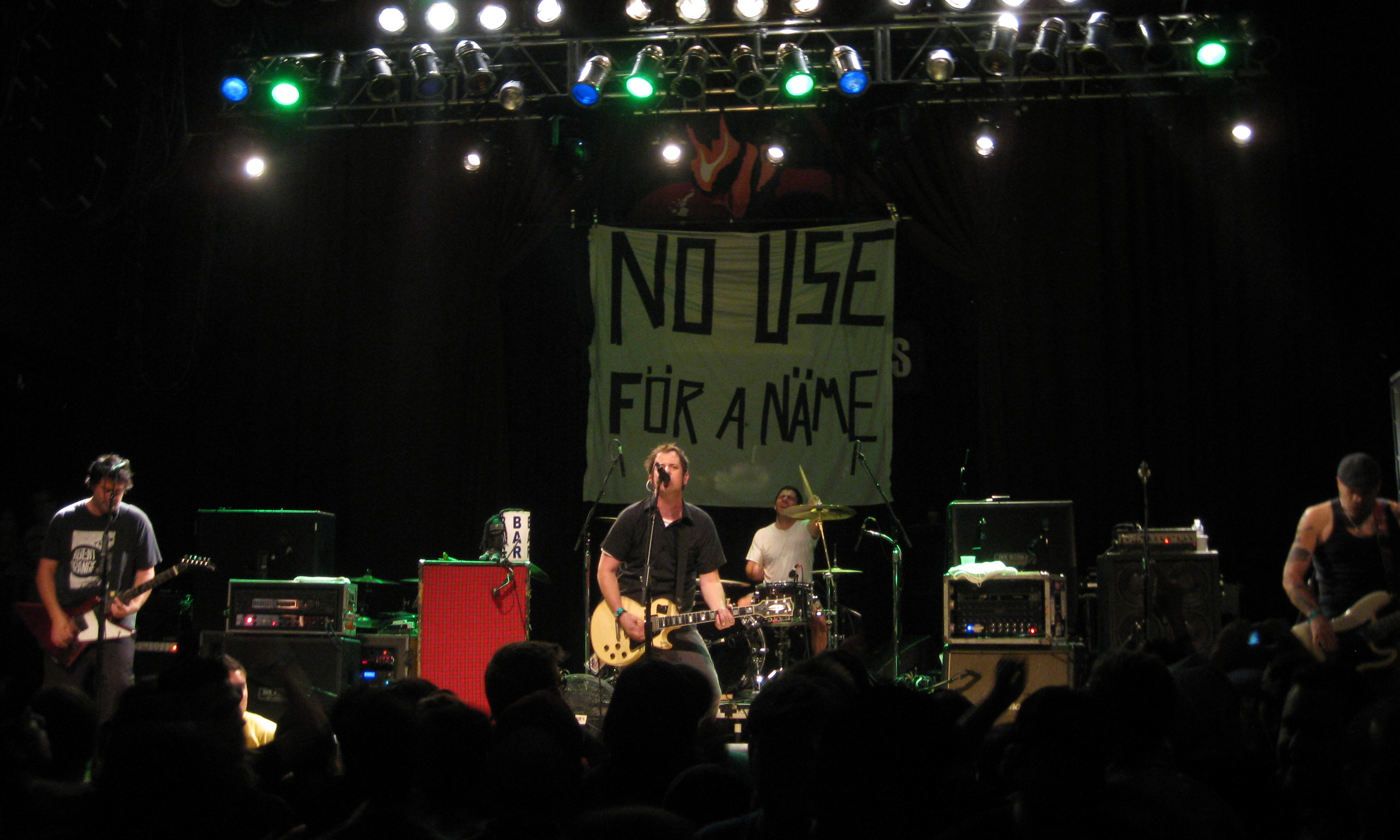
- No Use for a Name in 2012
- Studio albums: 8
- Extended plays: 4
- Live albums: 1
- Compilation albums: 4
- Singles: 1
- Music videos: 7
- Other appearances: 13

The discography of No Use for a Name, a punk rock band active from 1987 to 2012, consists of eight studio albums, one live album, two compilation albums, four EPs, one single, and seven music videos.

== Studio albums ==
Year	Album details	Peak chart positions	
Year	Album details	US	
Year	Album details	Independent	Heatseekers
1990	Incognito: Released: November 16, 1990; Label: New Red Archives (NRA 20); Formats: CD, download	—	—
1992	Don't Miss the Train: Released: October 23, 1992; Label: New Red Archives (NRA 32); Formats: CD, download	—	—
1995	¡Leche con Carne!: Released: February 15, 1995; Label: Fat Wreck Chords (FAT 522); Formats: LP, CD, download	—	—
1997	Making Friends: Released: August 19, 1997; Label: Fat Wreck Chords (FAT 557); Formats: LP, CD, download	—	—
1999	More Betterness!: Released: October 5, 1999; Label: Fat Wreck Chords (FAT 593); Formats: LP, CD, download	—	—
2002	Hard Rock Bottom: Released: June 18, 2002; Label: Fat Wreck Chords (FAT 639); Formats: LP, CD, download	24	27
2005	Keep Them Confused: Released: June 14, 2005; Label: Fat Wreck Chords (FAT 691); Formats: LP, CD, download	43	31
2008	The Feel Good Record of the Year: Released: April 1, 2008; Label: Fat Wreck Chords (FAT 730); Formats: LP, CD, download	—	19
"—" denotes releases that did not chart.

== Live albums ==
Year	Album details	Peak chart positions
Year	Album details	US
Year	Album details	Independent
2001	Live in a Dive: Released: September 11, 2001; Label: Fat Wreck Chords (FAT 622); Format: LP, CD, download	35

== Compilation albums ==
Year	Album details
2000	The NRA Years: Released: 2000; Label: Golf; Format: CD
2007	All the Best Songs: Released: July 10, 2007; Label: Fat Wreck Chords (FAT 690); Format: CD, download; Reissued February 12, 2016 as a double LP, CD, and download with an altered track list and new cover art (FAT 952)
2017	Rarities Vol. I: The Covers: Released: August 11, 2017; Label: Fat Wreck Chords (FAT 972); Format: LP, CD
2021	Rarities Vol. 2: The Originals: Released: February 12, 2021; Label: Fat Wreck Chords (FAT 973); Format: LP, CD

== EPs ==
Year	Release details
1988	No Use for a Name: Released: 1988; Label: Woodpecker; Format: 7"
1990	Let 'Em Out!: Released: 1990; Label: Slap-a-Ham; Format: 7"
1993	Death Doesn't Care: Released: 1993; Label: New Red Archives; Format:
1993	The Daily Grind: Released: May 31, 1993; Label: Fat Wreck Chords (FAT 507); Format: CD, EP, download

== Singles ==
Year	Release details
1996	No Use for a Name / Soda: Released: 1996; Label: Sessions; Format:

== Music videos ==
Year	Song	Director	Album
1995	"Soulmate"		¡Leche con Carne!
1999	"Why Doesn't Anybody Like Me?"		More Betterness!
2002	"Dumb Reminders"		Hard Rock Bottom
2005	"This Ain't No Way to Live"		Cake Boy soundtrack
2005	"For Fiona"		Keep Them Confused
2008	"Biggest Lie"		The Feel Good Record of the Year
2008	"Pacific Standard Time"		The Feel Good Record of the Year

== Other appearances ==
The following No Use for a Name songs were released on compilation albums, soundtracks, and other releases.

Year	Release details	Track(s)
1987	Turn It Around!: Released: October 1987; Label: Maximumrocknroll; Format: EP	"Gang Way"
1989	The Thing That Ate Floyd: Released: March 1989; Label: Lookout Records; Format: CD	"What!?!"
1995	Hardcore Breakout USA Volume 2: Released: May 8, 1995; Label: New Red Archives; Format: CD	"People Suck"
1995	Skaters Gear - 6: Released: Dec. 12, 1995; Label: J!mco Records; Format: CD	"People Suck"; "Born Addicted"
1997	Before You Were Punk: Released: March 11, 1997; Label: Vagrant (VR 330); Format: CD	"Turning Japanese" (originally performed by The Vapors)
1997	The Punk, The Bad & The Ugly: Released: March 11, 1997; Label: Cleopatra Records; Format: CD	"Thorn In My Side"
1997	Show & Tell: A Stormy Remembrance Of TV Theme Songs: Released: May 6, 1997; Label: Which?; Format: CD	"Laverne and Shirley (Making Our Dreams Come True)"
1998	The Show soundtrack: Released: January 14, 1998; Label: Theologian (T-67); Format: CD	"I've Heard" (originally performed by Dag Nasty)
1999	Short Music for Short People: Released: June 1, 1999; Label: Fat Wreck Chords (FAT 591); Format: CD	"Sara Fisher"
1999	Return of the Read Menace: Released: August 15, 1999; Label: G7 Welcoming Committee (G7 010); Format: CD	"Hybrid Moments" (originally performed by the Misfits)
1999	Mighty Attack: Released: September 23, 1999; Label: Flavour Records; Format: CD	"DMV"; "Born Addicted"; "Loony Tune"
2001	Live Fat, Die Young: Released: March 6, 2001; Label: Fat Wreck Chords (FAT 613); Format: CD, LP	"Let Me Down" (early version)
2001	Warped Tour 2001 Tour Compilation: Released: June 19, 2001; Label: SideOneDummy (SD 71227); Format: CD	"Enjoy the Silence" (originally performed by Depeche Mode)
2004	Rock Against Bush, Vol. 2: Released: August 10, 2004; Label: Fat Wreck Chords (FAT 677); Format: CD	"Fields of Agony" (acoustic)
2005	Cake Boy soundtrack: Released: 2005; Label: Kung Fu; Format: CD	"This Ain't No Way to Live"; "Selwyn's Got a Problem"; "Fatal Flu" (acoustic); "1945" (originally performed by Social Distortion); "Coming Too Close" (acoustic)
2006	Forever Free: Released: January 24, 2006; Label: Baseline Music Co.; Format: CD	"Badfish" (originally performed by Sublime)
2009	Wrecktrospective: Released: December 8, 2009; Label: Fat Wreck Chords (FAT 700); Format: CD, download	"Always Carrie" (demo)
2010	Harder, Fatter + Louder!: Released: November 23, 2010; Label: Fat Wreck Chords (FAT 762); Format: LP, CD, download	"Dream Police" (originally performed by Cheap Trick)
