= Rarities Vol. I: The Covers =

Compilation album by No Use for a Name
- Released: September 11, 2017
- Genre: Punk rock
- Length: 31:58
- Label: Fat Wreck Chords

No Use for a Name chronology
The Feel Good Record of the Year (2008)	Rarities Vol. I: The Covers (2017)	Rarities Vol. 2: The Originals (2021)

Professional ratings
Review scores
Source	Rating
Punknews.org	3.5/5 stars
New Noise Magazine	3/5 stars
Walls of Sound	7/10 stars
Scene Point Blank	6.8/10 stars

Rarities Vol. I: The Covers is a compilation album by the American punk rock band No Use for a Name, released August 11, 2017 through Fat Wreck Chords. It consists of cover versions that the band recorded over the course of their career, and which were previously released on compilations, soundtracks, and tribute albums. One of several No Use for a Name collections released in the years following the death of band leader Tony Sly, Rarities Vol. I follows a 2016 re-release of the band's "best-of" compilation All the Best Songs, and was followed by Rarities Vol. 2: The Originals in 2021.

== Track listing ==
Credits adapted from the album's liner notes.

No.	Title	Writer(s)	Original performer	Length
1.	"Turning Japanese" (from Before You Were Punk, 1997)	David Fenton	The Vapors	3:29
2.	"Hybrid Moments" (from Return of the Read Menace, 1999)	Glenn Danzig	Misfits	1:39
3.	"I've Heard" (from The Show soundtrack, 1998)	Brian Baker, Doug Carrion, Peter Cortner, Scott Garrett	Dag Nasty	1:37
4.	"Selwyn's Got a Problem" (from the Cake Boy soundtrack, 2005)	Casey Royer	D.I. (as "Johnny's Got a Problem")	1:57
5.	"Enjoy the Silence" (from Warped Tour 2001 Tour Compilation, 2001)	Martin Gore	Depeche Mode	2:41
6.	"Badfish" (from Forever Free: A Sublime Tribute Album, 2006)	Bradley Nowell	Sublime	3:00
7.	"Dream Police" (from Harder, Fatter + Louder!, 2010)	Rick Nielsen	Cheap Trick	3:00
8.	"Fairytale of New York" (from How to Start a Fight!, 1996)	Shane MacGowan, Jem Finer	The Pogues	3:24
9.	"Making Our Dreams Come True" (from Show & Tell, 1997)	Charles Fox, Norman Gimbel	Cyndi Grecco	1:12
10.	"1945" (from the Cake Boy soundtrack, 2005)	Mike Ness	Social Distortion	2:14
11.	"Don't Cry for Me Argentina" (from Punk Ass Generosity, 1999)	Andrew Lloyd Webber, Tim Rice	Julie Covington	4:00
12.	"The Munsters' Theme" (from Show & Tell, 1997)	Jack Marshall	Jack Marshall	0:41
13.	"Beth" (hidden track on Making Friends, 1997)	Peter Criss, Bob Ezrin, Stan Penridge	Kiss	3:04
Total length:				31:58

== Personnel ==
Credits adapted from the album's liner notes.

- Tony Sly – vocals, guitar
- Chris Shiflett – guitar (tracks 1–3, 8, 9, 11–13)
- Dave Nassie – guitar (tracks 4–7, 10)
- Matt Riddle – bass, vocals
- Rory Koff – drums
- Meegan Lair – guest vocals (track 8)
- Ryan Greene – audio engineer, mixing engineer
- Randy Steffes – audio engineer (track 5)
- Compiled by Fat Mike and Chad Williams
- Tardon Feathered – tape transfers, mastering
- Greg Dixon – photographs
- Sergie Loobkoff – artwork, layout
