= All the Best Songs =

Compilation album by No Use for a Name
- Released: July 10, 2007
- Recorded: 1993–2005
- Genre: Punk rock
- Length: 71:48
- Label: Fat Wreck Chords
- Producer: Donnell Cameron, Pat Coughlin, Fat Mike, Ryan Greene, Ed Gregor, Karl H., Rory Koff, Dave Nassie, Steve Papoutsis, Chris Shiflett, Tony Sly

No Use for a Name chronology
Keep Them Confused (2005)	All the Best Songs (2007)	The Feel Good Record of the Year (2008)

All the Best Songs is a compilation album by the American punk rock band No Use for a Name, released July 10, 2007 through Fat Wreck Chords. A "best of" album, it compiles 24 tracks from the band's six studio releases between 1993 and 2005, as well as two previously unreleased songs recorded during sessions for their 2005 album Keep Them Confused. Following the 2012 death of band leader Tony Sly, Fat Wreck Chords released an updated version of the album in 2016, dropping the two Keep Them Confused outtakes and adding four tracks from the band's final studio album, 2008's The Feel Good Record of the Year. The Keep them Confused outtakes were later released on the b-sides compilation Rarities Vol. 2: The Originals

== Release ==
No Use for a Name supported the album with a headlining West Coast tour, with support from Whole Wheat Bread and the Flatliners.

== Reception ==
Reviewing the album for AllMusic, Jo-Ann Greene rated it 4 1/2 stars out of 5, calling it "a grand retrospective of the high points of their Fat years."

== Track listing ==
Credits adapted from the album's liner notes.

All tracks are written by Tony Sly.

Original 2007 release
No.	Title	Length
1.	"International You Day" (from Hard Rock Bottom, 2002)	2:54
2.	"Justified Black Eye" (from ¡Leche con Carne!, 1995)	2:39
3.	"Coming Too Close" (from Life in the Fat Lane, 1999)	3:04
4.	"Invincible" (from Making Friends, 1997)	2:18
5.	"Dumb Reminders" (from Hard Rock Bottom, 2002)	2:49
6.	"Fatal Flu" (from ¡Leche con Carne!, 1995)	2:27
7.	"Life Size Mirror" (from More Betterness!, 1999)	3:14
8.	"On the Outside" (from Making Friends, 1997)	2:51
9.	"Soulmate" (from ¡Leche con Carne!, 1995)	3:04
10.	"Let Me Down" (from Hard Rock Bottom, 2002)	2:58
11.	"Permanent Rust" (from The Daily Grind, 1993)	2:33
12.	"Chasing Rainbows" (from More Betterness!, 1999)	2:50
13.	"Not Your Savior" (from More Betterness!, 1999)	3:54
14.	"Black Box" (from Keep Them Confused, 2005)	2:52
15.	"The Answer Is Still No" (from Making Friends, 1997)	2:39
16.	"Straight from the Jacket" (from ¡Leche con Carne!, 1995)	2:22
17.	"Any Number Can Play" (from Hard Rock Bottom, 2002)	2:44
18.	"For Fiona" (from Keep Them Confused, 2005)	2:45
19.	"The Daily Grind" (from The Daily Grind, 1993)	2:22
20.	"Let It Slide" (from More Betterness!, 1999)	2:14
21.	"Feeding the Fire" (from The Daily Grind, 1993)	2:28
22.	"Part Two" (from Keep Them Confused, 2005)	3:35
23.	"Growing Down" (from Making Friends, 1997)	2:04
24.	"Exit" (from ¡Leche con Carne!, 1995)	3:35
25.	"History Defeats" (previously unreleased outtake from the Keep Them Confused sessions)	2:22
26.	"Stunt Double" (previously unreleased outtake from the Keep Them Confused sessions)	2:11
Total length:		71:48

2016 reissue
No.	Title	Length
1.	"International You Day" (from Hard Rock Bottom, 2002)	2:54
2.	"Justified Black Eye" (from ¡Leche con Carne!, 1995)	2:39
3.	"Coming Too Close" (from More Betterness!, 1999)	3:04
4.	"Invincible" (from Making Friends, 1997)	2:18
5.	"Dumb Reminders" (from Hard Rock Bottom, 2002)	2:49
6.	"Biggest Lie" (from The Feel Good Record of the Year, 2008)	2:09
7.	"Fatal Flu" (from ¡Leche con Carne!, 1995)	2:27
8.	"Life Size Mirror" (from More Betterness!, 1999)	3:14
9.	"On the Outside" (from Making Friends, 1997)	2:51
10.	"Soulmate" (from ¡Leche con Carne!, 1995)	3:04
11.	"Let Me Down" (from Hard Rock Bottom, 2002)	2:58
12.	"The Feel Good Song of the Year" (from The Feel Good Record of the Year, 2008)	3:09
13.	"Permanent Rust" (from The Daily Grind, 1993)	2:33
14.	"Chasing Rainbows" (from More Betterness!, 1999)	2:50
15.	"The Trumpet Player" (from The Feel Good Record of the Year, 2008)	3:10
16.	"Not Your Savior" (from More Betterness!, 1999)	3:54
17.	"Black Box" (from Keep Them Confused, 2005)	2:52
18.	"The Answer Is Still No" (from Making Friends, 1997)	2:39
19.	"Straight from the Jacket" (from ¡Leche con Carne!, 1995)	2:22
20.	"Any Number Can Play" (from Hard Rock Bottom, 2002)	2:44
21.	"For Fiona" (from Keep Them Confused, 2005)	2:45
22.	"The Daily Grind" (from The Daily Grind, 1993)	2:22
23.	"Under the Garden" (from The Feel Good Record of the Year, 2008)	3:01
24.	"Let It Slide" (from More Betterness!, 1999)	2:14
25.	"Feeding the Fire" (from The Daily Grind, 1993)	2:28
26.	"Part Two" (from Keep Them Confused, 2005)	3:35
27.	"Growing Down" (from Making Friends, 1997)	2:04
28.	"Exit" (from ¡Leche con Carne!, 1995)	3:35

== Personnel ==
Credits adapted from the album's liner notes.

Band

- Tony Sly – guitar, lead vocals
- Rory Koff – drums
- Robin Pfefer – lead guitar on tracks from The Daily Grind
- Ed Gregor – lead guitar on tracks from ¡Leche con Carne!
- Chris Shiflett – lead guitar and backing vocals on tracks from Making Friends, Life in the Fat Lane, and More Betterness!
- Dave Nassie – lead guitar on tracks from Hard Rock Bottom, Keep Them Confused, and The Feel Good Record of the Year
- Steve Papoutsis – bass guitar on tracks from The Daily Grind and ¡Leche con Carne!
- Matt Riddle – bass guitar and backing vocals on tracks from Making Friends, Life in the Fat Lane, More Betterness!, Hard Rock Bottom, Keep Them Confused, and The Feel Good Record of the Year

Additional performers

- Karina Denike – additional vocals on "On the Outside"
- Dicky Barrett – additional vocals on "Growing Down"
- Spike Slawson – backing vocals on "Chasing Rainbows"
- Rebekah Scott – cello on "Not Your Savior" and "Let It Slide"
- Jennifer Walker – cello on "Let Me Down"
- Dana Lynn – violin on "Let It Slide"

Production

- All tracks produced by Ryan Greene and No Use for a Name, except:
- "Feeding the Fire" produced by Steve Papoutsis and Karl H.
- "Permanent Rust" and "The Daily Grind" produced by Pat Coughlin, Fat Mike, and Donnell Cameron
- Tracks from ¡Leche con Carne! produced by Fat Mike, Ryan Greene, and No Use for a Name
- Tracks from The Feel Good Record of the Year produced and engineered by Bill Stevenson and Jason Livermore, with additional engineering by Andrew Berlin and Jason Allen
- Tardon Feathered – tape transfers, mastering
- Jason Livermore – digital remastering

Artwork and design

- Brian Archer – layout, front cover and interior photographs
- Matt Riddle – back cover photograph
- Additional interior photographs by Scott Cole, Kate Powers, Marina Miller, Brian Wynacht, Winni Wintermeyer, Lisa Johnson, BJ Papas, Murray Bowles, and Chris McCaw
