= Rarities Vol. 2: The Originals =

Compilation album by No Use for a Name
- Released: February 12, 2021
- Genre: Punk rock
- Length: 37:40
- Label: Fat Wreck Chords

No Use for a Name chronology
| Rarities Vol. I: The Covers (2017) | Rarities Vol. 2: The Originals (2021) |

Professional ratings
Review scores
| Source | Rating |
|---|---|
| Gestromt.de | 5/6 stars |
| The Punk Site | 4/5 stars |
| MoreCore.de | (moderately positive) |
| brokenheadphones.com | (positive) |
| Gaesteliste.de | (positive) |

Rarities Vol. 2: The Originals is a compilation album by the American punk rock band No Use for a Name, released February 12, 2021 through Fat Wreck Chords. A sequel to 2017's Rarities Vol. I: The Covers, it consists of demos and early versions of songs that were later recorded for the band's studio albums (including seven previously unreleased demos for their 2002 album Hard Rock Bottom), as well as tracks that appeared on 7-inches and compilation albums.

== Track listing ==
Credits adapted from the album's liner notes.

All tracks are written by Tony Sly.

| No. | Title | Length |
|---|---|---|
| 1. | "Sidewalk" (early version, from No Use for a Name / Soda split, 1996) | 2:29 |
| 2. | "No Way to Live" (from the Secret Weapons of Kung Fu DVD, 2002) | 2:42 |
| 3. | "Justified Black Eye" (early version, from "Justified Black Eye" / "Sidewalk", 2017; recorded in 1994) | 2:37 |
| 4. | "History Defeats" (from All the Best Songs, 2007) | 2:24 |
| 5. | "Stunt Double" (from All the Best Songs, 2007) | 2:09 |
| 6. | "Let Me Down" (early version, from Live Fat, Die Young, 2001) | 2:57 |
| 7. | "Sara Fisher" (from Short Music for Short People, 1999) | 0:32 |
| 8. | "Coming Too Close" (early version, from Life in the Fat Lane, 1999) | 3:06 |
| 9. | "Any Number Can Play" (demo version, recorded 2001) | 2:43 |
| 10. | "Dumb Reminders" (demo version, recorded 2001) | 2:45 |
| 11. | "Friends of the Enemy"" (demo version, recorded 2001) | 3:22 |
| 12. | "International You Day" (demo version, recorded 2001) | 2:47 |
| 13. | "Nailed Shut" (demo version, recorded 2001) | 2:30 |
| 14. | "Pre-Medicated Murder" (demo version, recorded 2001) | 1:50 |
| 15. | "Solitaire" (demo version, recorded 2001) | 2:47 |

== Personnel ==
Credits adapted from the album's liner notes.

- Tony Sly – vocals, guitar
- Chris Shiflett – guitar (tracks 1, 7, 8)
- Dave Nassie – guitar (tracks 2, 4–6, 9–15)
- Ed Gregor – guitar (track 3)
- Matt Riddle – bass, vocals (tracks 1, 2, 4–15)
- Steve Papoutsis – bass (track 3)
- Rory Koff – drums
- Compiled by Fat Mike and Chad Williams
- Justin Weis – mastering
- Sergie Loobkoff – artwork, layout
