= First Ditch Effort =

Studio album by NOFX
- Released: October 7, 2016
- Recorded: 2016
- Genre: Hardcore punk
- Length: 33:07
- Label: Fat Wreck Chords
- Producers: Cameron Webb, Fat Mike

NOFX chronology
| Stoke Extinguisher (2013) | First Ditch Effort (2016) | Hepatitis Bathtub (2016) |

Singles from First Ditch Effort
- 1. "Six Years on Dope" Released: July 19, 2016; 2. "I Don't Like Me Anymore" Released: August 26, 2016; 3. "Oxy Moronic" Released: September 9, 2016

Professional ratings
Aggregate scores
| Source | Rating |
|---|---|
| Metacritic | 78/100 |
Review scores
| Source | Rating |
| AllMusic | 3.5/5 stars |
| The A.V. Club | B− |
| New Noise Magazine | 4.5/5 stars |
| PopMatters | 7/10 |

First Ditch Effort is the thirteenth studio album by the American punk rock band NOFX, released on October 7, 2016.

== Release ==
"Six Years on Dope" was the first song released off of the album to the Fat Wreck Chords YouTube page on July 20, 2016. "Oxy Moronic" was released to radio on September 14, 2016. First Ditch Effort was released on October 7. The span of four years between Self Entitled (2012) and First Ditch Effort was longest gap between two NOFX studio albums up to this point, and it also marked the first time since The War on Errorism (2003) that the band had not worked with Bill Stevenson; instead, the album was produced by Cameron Webb.

The song "I'm So Sorry, Tony" is a tribute to late No Use for a Name frontman Tony Sly.

== Track listing ==
All tracks are written by Fat Mike except "I Don't Like Me Anymore" and "It Ain't Lonely at the Bottom" by Fat Mike and Eric Melvin.

| No. | Title | Length |
|---|---|---|
| 1. | "Six Years on Dope" | 1:32 |
| 2. | "Happy Father's Day" | 1:14 |
| 3. | "Sid and Nancy" | 2:22 |
| 4. | "California Drought" | 3:14 |
| 5. | "Oxy Moronic" | 3:56 |
| 6. | "I Don't Like Me Anymore" | 2:30 |
| 7. | "I'm a Transvest-lite" | 2:16 |
| 8. | "Ditch Effort" | 1:47 |
| 9. | "Dead Beat Mom" | 2:18 |
| 10. | "Bye Bye Biopsy Girl" | 2:00 |
| 11. | "It Ain't Lonely at the Bottom" | 1:33 |
| 12. | "I'm So Sorry Tony" | 3:18 |
| 13. | "Generation Z" | 5:07 |
| Total length: | | 33:07 |

== Personnel ==
=== NOFX ===
- Fat Mike – lead vocals, bass, keyboards, piano
- Eric Melvin – rhythm guitar, backing vocals, co-lead vocals on "Six Years On Dope", keyboards on "It Ain't Lonely at the Bottom"
- El Hefe – lead guitar, vocals, horns
- Erik Sandin – drums, percussion

=== Additional musicians ===
- Johnny OMM – Harmonies
- Karina Deniké – Backup Vocals on "Sid and Nancy" and "I'm So Sorry Tony"
- Joey Balls – Piano on "Sid and Nancy" and "I Don't Like Me Anymore"
- Matt Garney – Keyboards on "California Drought"
- Josh Freese – Additional drums on "California Drought"
- Fletcher Dragge – Backup vocals on "I'm a Transvest-Lite"
- Brian Baker – Lead Guitar on "Dead Beat Mom"
- Luis and Toku – Guitar and Sax on "Bye Bye Biopsy Girl"
- Joey Cape – Backup Vocals on "I'm So Sorry Tony"
- Chris Shiflett – Lead Guitar on "Generation Z"
- Darius Koski – Viola on "Generation Z"
- Chris Mathewson – Keyboards on "Generation Z"
- Darla Burkett – Backup Vocals on "Generation Z"
- Fiona Sly – Backup Vocals on "Generation Z"
- Sidra Hitching – Poet on "Generation Z"

Production

- Cameron Webb and Fat Mike – producers

Engineers

- Cameron Webb

== Charts ==
| Chart (2016) | Peak position |
|---|---|
| Australian Albums (ARIA) | 27 |
| Austrian Albums (Ö3 Austria) | 28 |
| Belgian Albums (Ultratop Flanders) | 116 |
| Canadian Albums (Billboard) | 23 |
| German Albums (Offizielle Top 100) | 16 |
| Swiss Albums (Schweizer Hitparade) | 33 |
| US Billboard 200 | 54 |
| US Independent Albums (Billboard) | 12 |

== First Ditch Effort (Commentary Version) ==
On October 28, 2016, a commentary version of First Ditch Effort was released. It has Fat Mike giving facts, thoughts, and meanings about each track and the album itself.
