= Coaster (album) =

Studio album by NOFX
- Released: April 28, 2009
- Recorded: November 2008
- Studios: Motor, San Francisco, California
- Genres: Punk rock; pop punk; skate punk; jazz punk
- Length: 32:48
- Label: Fat Wreck Chords
- Producer: Bill Stevenson

NOFX chronology
They've Actually Gotten Worse Live! (2007)	Coaster (2009)	Cokie the Clown (2009)

Frisbee
- Vinyl cover

Professional ratings
Review scores
Source	Rating
AbsolutePunk	85% link
AllMusic	link
Robert Christgau	link
Rock Sound	8/10 stars

Coaster (released on vinyl as Frisbee) is the eleventh studio album by the American punk rock band NOFX. It was released on April 28, 2009, through Fat Wreck Chords.

== Writing and production ==
The band went on Canadian and East Coast US tours in October 2008 with support from Dillinger Four, the Flatliners, and Break on Through. Following this, writing and recording sessions for Coaster took place in November 2008. The band worked with Bill Stevenson, who produced Wolves in Wolves' Clothing (2006) and Self Entitled (2012).

== Release ==
In January and February 2009, the band embarked on a West Coast US tour with main support from Smoke or Fire and various other acts opening each date. On February 24, 2009, Coaster was announced for release in two months' time. On March 3, the album's track listing and artwork were revealed. On March 28, "The Quitter" was released for free download, while "Creeping Out Sara" was posted online on April 15, 2009. They did a MySpace Transmissions session where they performed "The Quitter" and "My Orphan Year". Following this, the band performed at the Punk Spring festival in Japan and Groezrock in Belgium soon after. Coaster was made available for streaming through their Myspace on April 23, before being released on April 28 through Fat Wreck Chords. The album was the first new Fat Wreck Chords release priced under $10 in the US under the label's new promise that all CDs from the label would cost under $10, with many priced less than $8. Regarding the label's new pricing model, NOFX lead singer and Fat Wreck Chords owner Fat Mike stated the following:

This is not a sale. This is how much this CD costs.... We make less profit, but bands hopefully will sell more CDs to more people, which is why we started doing this in the first place.

Some of those who preordered the album through the Fat Wreck Chords website also received a limited edition, hand-numbered CD with two bonus tracks. The album was simultaneously released on vinyl under the title Frisbee with alternative artwork. As with the CD release, vinyl preorders came with a bonus 7-inch single with the same two bonus tracks. The vinyl release also came with a free MP3 download of the album. The vinyl release features an alternative intro to the opening track "We Called it America". The song "Creeping Out Sara" is about meeting Sara Quin of the indie band Tegan and Sara. The vinyl edition of the album has an alternate version called 'Creeping Out Tegan' which has alternate lyrics and is about a meeting with Sara's identical twin sister and bandmate Tegan Quin. The vinyl release also features an alternate trumpet solo and organ intro on the track 'Best God in Show.'

To promote the album's release, the band went on a tour of Europe with the Flatliners; Snuff appeared on three of the shows. Between June and August 2009, the band performed on the Warped Tour. In September and October, they went on a tour of Australia with Bad Religion and Pour Habit. A few songs not included on the album that were written and recorded during the Coaster sessions were released on the Cokie the Clown EP in November. They closed out the year touring Mexico, Costa Rica and Panama in December 2009. After a performance at the Musink Music Festival, the band went on a South American tour in February and March 2010. In April and May 2010, the band went on a US tour with Teenage Bottlerocket and No Use for a Name frontman Tony Sly, and performed at the Punk Rock Bowling Tournament festival. Following this, they appeared at the Reading and Leeds Festivals in the UK. In April 2011, the band appeared at Groezrock.

== Artwork ==
The covers of both Coaster and Frisbee are in a style reminiscent of graphic design from the 1970s. The lyric booklet included with Coaster also includes photos of the band members from that time period.

The cover art of Coaster shows a compact disc being used as an alcoholic drink coaster with the disc art side facing down (data side facing up). The rear cover shows various older NOFX albums also being used as coasters with the disc art facing up. The disc art itself declares "Absorbing Alcohol Since 1983" (the year the band formed).

The alternate Frisbee artwork depicts guitarist Eric Melvin catching a vinyl record as he would a frisbee. The rear cover shows a dog in mid air preparing to catch the vinyl frisbee record.

== Track listing ==
All tracks are written by Fat Mike.

No.	Title	Length
1.	"We Called It America" (Opens with an Alec Baldwin (CD) or Jack Lemmon (Vinyl) quote from the film Glengarry Glen Ross)	2:07
2.	"The Quitter"	1:52
3.	"First Call"	2:33
4.	"My Orphan Year"	2:59
5.	"Blasphemy (The Victimless Crime)"	2:54
6.	"Creeping Out Sara" (Appears as "Creeping Out Tegan" on Frisbee)	2:45
7.	"Eddie, Bruce and Paul"	3:53
8.	"Best God in Show"	3:29
9.	"Suits and Ladders" (vocals F. Mike & E. Melvin)	2:25
10.	"The Agony of Victory" (Side note in album booklet reads "Note: This is not a NOFX song. This is a song that we covered from a yet to be released soundtrack album. Stay tuned for more details..." In 2015, it was revealed to be a song from the musical Home Street Home, written by Fat Mike, Jeff Marx, and Goddess Soma.)	2:07
11.	"I Am an Alcoholic"	2:36
12.	"One Million Coasters"	3:08
Total length:		32:48

Bonus CD or 7" tracks (pre-order bonus with Coaster or Frisbee respectively)
No.	Title	Length
1.	"I've Become a Cliché"	3:13
2.	"The Quitter" (Demo)	1:46
Total length:		4:59

== Personnel ==
=== NOFX ===
- Fat Mike – vocals, bass, keyboard (tracks 5 and 6)
- Eric Melvin – guitar, vocals
- El Hefe – guitar, vocals, trombone (track 8)
- Erik Sandin – drums

=== Additional musicians ===
- Aaron Novik – bass clarinet (track 12)
- Jason Freese – keyboard (track 8)
- Karina Denike, Spike Slawson – backing vocals on "lots of things"

=== Production ===
- Bill Stevenson, Jason Livermore, Fat Mike – producers
- Bill Stevenson, Jason Livermore, Jamie McMann – engineers
- Andrew Berlin, Felipe Patino – additional engineers

=== Artwork ===
- Ryan Harlin – graphic design
- Lisa Eriksson – additional layout

== Charts ==
Chart performance for Coaster
Chart (2009)	Peak position
Australian Albums (ARIA)	24
Canadian Albums (Nielsen SoundScan)	29
French Albums (SNEP)	176
German Albums (Offizielle Top 100)	50
Swiss Albums (Schweizer Hitparade)	100
UK Independent Albums (Official Charts)	18
US Billboard 200	36
US Independent Albums (Billboard)	4
US Indie Store Album Sales (Billboard)	6
US Top Alternative Albums (Billboard)	7
US Top Rock Albums (Billboard)	9
