= Somehow =

Somehow may refer to:

- "Somehow", a song by The Vapors from the 1980 album New Clear Days
- "Somehow", a song by Drake Bell from the 2005 album Telegraph
- "Somehow", a song by Joss Stone from the 2011 album LP1
