= Keep Them Confused =

Studio album by No Use for a Name
- Released: June 14, 2005
- Recorded: 2005
- Genres: Punk rock, pop punk
- Length: 35:17
- Label: Fat Wreck Chords
- Producer: Ryan Greene

No Use for a Name chronology
Hard Rock Bottom (2002)	Keep Them Confused (2005)	All the Best Songs (2007)

Professional ratings
Review scores
Source	Rating
AllMusic	4/5 stars
IGN	7.1/10

Keep Them Confused the seventh studio album by punk rock band No Use for a Name, released on June 14, 2005, via Fat Wreck Chords. A video for "For Fiona", a track about lead singer Tony Sly's daughter, has been released on the aforementioned record label.

== Release ==
On March 3, 2005, Keep Them Confused was announced for release in three months' time. No Use for a Name initially planned to tour Europe in April and May 2005 as part of the Deconstruction Tour, thought they later pulled out of the trek and were replaced by Mad Caddies. On May 5, 2005, the album's artwork and track listing was posted online. A Black Box EP was planned for release on May 17, 2005, to include "Check for a Pulse", "History Defeats" and "Dream Police", but this EP ultimately went unreleased. "For Fiona" was posted online on May 20, 2005; a music video was released online for the track on June 7, 2005. Keep Them Confused was released on June 14, 2005 through Fat Wreck Chords; that month, the band embarked on a tour of Canada with Bigwig and the Reason, which included an appearance at Exo Fest. On the same day as the album, "For Fiona" was released to radio.

In August and September 2005, the band went on a tour of Europe with support from Useless ID. In October and November 2005, they toured Australia, which was followed by treks to New Zealand and Japan. They opened 2006 supporting Pennywise on their headlining month-long West Coast US tour. Following this, the band toured the rest of the US with the Suicide Machines and I Am the Avalanche until early March 2006. Shows continued for the rest of the month with Rufio replacing the Suicide Machines. No Use for a Name returned to Europe in April and May 2006 alongside the Lawrence Arms, which included an appearance at the Groezrock festival. Following this, they embarked on a short tour of Canada, appeared at Wakestock, and went on a short tour of Japan with I Am the Avalanche.

== Track listing ==
All songs written by Tony Sly.

1. "Part Two" – 3:35
2. "There Will Be Revenge" – 2:42
3. "For Fiona" – 2:41
4. "Check for a Pulse" – 2:36
5. "Divine Let Down" – 1:41
6. "Black Box" – 2:50
7. "Bullets" – 2:27
8. "Failing Is Easier (Part Three)" – 0:41
9. "Apparition" – 3:18
10. "It's Tragic" – 3:24
11. "Killing Time" – 2:58
12. "Slowly Fading Fast" – 3:10
13. "Overdue" – 3:14

Inside group photo by Bryan K. Wynacht

== Personnel ==
- Tony Sly - vocals and guitar
- Dave Nassie – guitar
- Matt Riddle – bass
- Rory Koff – drums
