= NOFX (2011 EP) =

HARDCORE

EP by NOFX
- Released: August 2, 2011
- Recorded: 2009
- Genre: Hardcore punk
- Label: Fat

NOFX chronology
NOFX / The Spits (2010)	HARDCORE (2011)	Self Entitled (2012)

Professional ratings
Review scores
Source	Rating
Punknews.org	3.5/5 stars
Rockfreaks.net	7/10 stars

NOFX is an EP by the American punk rock band NOFX, released August 2, 2011, through Fat Wreck Chords, and consisting almost entirely of cover versions of hardcore punk songs. The idea for the EP was originally announced in 2009—before the release of the group's eleventh studio album Coaster—and was originally announced to be released exclusively as a 10" vinyl record. The EP was also made available in 7", 12", and picture disc formats, all containing the same track listing.

== Track listing ==
The EP features eight cover versions of songs that were originally written by "rather obscure American hardcore bands" from the 1980s. The album's packaging does not list any song titles or writing credits. In various interviews, NOFX frontman Fat Mike suggested that the album would include songs by Necros, Social Unrest, Stretch Marks, and Rebel Truth. One of the songs is an original NOFX composition.

1 - Friend Or Foe (Agnostic Front cover) - 1:07
2 - IQ32 (Necros cover) - 0:24
3 - Police Brutality (Urban Waste cover) - 0:49
4 - Mental Breakdown (Social Unrest cover) - 1:26
5 - No More Lies (Battalion Of Saints cover) - 1:19
6 - Race Riot (NOFX) - 0:50
7 - Say We Suck (Sin 34 cover) - 1:11
8 - Child Hosts The Parasite (Rebel Truth cover) - 1:06
9 - Professional Punk (Stretch Marks cover) - 1:39

== Personnel ==
NOFX

- Fat Mike – vocals (5 - 7, 9), bass
- Eric Melvin – guitar, vocals (all songs)
- El Hefe – guitar, vocals (6)
- Erik Sandin – drums
