= Stoke Extinguisher =

EP by NOFX
- Released: November 26, 2013
- Genre: Punk rock
- Label: Fat Wreck Chords

NOFX chronology
Self Entitled (2012)	Stoke Extinguisher (2013)	First Ditch Effort (2016)

Professional ratings
Aggregate scores
Source	Rating
Metacritic	71/100
Review scores
Source	Rating
AllMusic	3.5/5 stars

Stoke Extinguisher is an EP by NOFX released on November 26, 2013 through Fat Wreck Chords. The EP was released as a six-song CD and a two-song 7". Both versions feature the new title song, "Stoke Extinguisher", as well as "The Shortest Pier", which was originally by Tony Sly and was recorded for The Songs of Tony Sly: A Tribute. The rest of the songs on the CD are b-sides collected from singles from the band's recent album, Self Entitled, although it does not include the alternate version of "She Didn't Lose Her Baby", the b-side from the "My Stepdad's a Cop and My Stepmom's a Domme" 7". The cover was hand painted by Jason Cruz of Strung Out.

== Track listings ==
No.	Title	Original release	Length
1.	"Stoke Extinguisher"	N/A	2:58
2.	"The Shortest Pier"	The Songs of Tony Sly: A Tribute	2:04

CD version only
No.	Title	Original release	Length
3.	"I Believe in Goddess (demo version)"	"Ronnie & Mags" 7"	1:33
4.	"My Stepdad's a Cop and My Stepmom's a Domme"	"My Stepdad's a Cop and My Stepmom's a Domme" 7"	2:12
5.	"Wore Out the Soles of My Party Boots (2012 version)"	"Xmas Has Been X'ed" / "New Year's Revolution 7"	2:11
6.	"New Year's Revolution"	"Xmas Has Been X'ed" / "New Year's Revolution 7"	2:20

== Personnel ==
- Fat Mike – vocals, bass
- Eric Melvin – guitar, vocals
- El Hefe – guitar, vocals
- Erik Sandin – drums
- Jamie McMann –engineer
