= Magnets (album) =

Studio album by The Vapors
- Released: 9 March 1981
- Recorded: November 1980
- Studio: Rock City, Shepperton; Farmyard Studios, Little Chalfont
- Genre: New wave, power pop
- Length: 41:49
- Label: Liberty (original), RT Industries (current)
- Producer: David Tickle

The Vapors chronology
| New Clear Days (1980) | Magnets (1981) | Together (2020) |

Professional ratings
Review scores
| Source | Rating |
|---|---|
| Allmusic | 3/5 stars |
| Sounds | 3/5 stars |

Magnets is the second album by British rock band The Vapors, released in 1981.

== Song details ==
The album continued The Vapors' dark lyrical themes, taking them to a slightly darker level, with "Jimmie Jones" being about American cult leader Jim Jones, "Isolated Case" about state oppression and disillusionment with politics, "Civic Hall" about the assault Dave suffered at the hands of overzealous Metropolitan policemen, "Spiders" and "Can't Talk Anymore" about mental illness, and the title track being about the assassinations of John F. Kennedy and Robert F. Kennedy. Even those songs about relationships - "Daylight Titans", "Johnny's in Love (Again)" and "Lenina" - are tinged with an edge of being in a suffocating society and a malevolent state apparatus.

== Artwork ==
The cover was designed by Martin Handford, later famous for his Where's Wally? books. It depicts an assassination scene close up, but from a distance looks like a human eye. The assassin can be seen on the roof at the top right of the album cover, putting away his sniper rifle.

== Reception ==
Despite positive reviews (particularly for the second single "Jimmie Jones" [UK No. 44] and the epic title track), the album failed to chart in the UK, possibly as a result of the lack of promotion on the part of their record label. The United Artists record company had been bought out by EMI in 1980 and later renamed Liberty, and many of the bands who came across as part of the deal complained of poor treatment by their disinterested new owner.

In his list of the Top 10 45s of 1981, Jim Green of Trouser Press ranked "Spiders" at no. 4.

Shortly after the release of Magnets, the failure of Liberty to commit to a seventh single resulted in The Vapors disbanding. The only other Vapors-related release, aside from many greatest hits albums, was a solo single by David Fenton.

== Releases ==
In 1998, Collectables Records issued the compilation album Vaporized, which included both of the band's albums, New Clear Days and Magnets, on the same CD. This was the first full release of Magnets on CD, although some of its tracks had been included on earlier CD releases.

In 2000, Captain Mod Records, an offshoot of the Captain Oi! label, specialising in punk rock and new wave bands, reissued both of the band's albums on CD, separately. Magnets included all of the album's single versions and B-sides as bonus tracks.

In 2021, British label Demon Records reissued Magnets on vinyl for the first time in 40 years, based on the 2000 remasters.

== Aftermath ==
After the label dropped the band, David Fenton decided to leave the band to focus on his new family: he had got married during The Vapors' formation. After this, Fenton opted to have a more secluded life. Drummer Howard Smith had already expressed losing interest in the project prior, claiming that he did not like the fame and that touring was becoming too exhausting. This only left bassist Steve Smith and guitarist Edward Bazalgette. Steve Smith eventually called it quits after the duo were unable to find the appropriate replacements after months of searching.

Edward Bazalgette was left to be the only remaining founding member and was forced to finally break-up the band, instead deciding to focus more on other intellectual pursuits, later becoming a professional film executive. The band members, however, remained friends and on good terms.

The group reformed in 2016.

== Track listing ==
- All songs written by David Fenton, except where noted.

Side one

1. "Jimmie Jones" - 3:23
2. "Spiders" - 4:57
3. "Isolated Case" (Edward Bazalgette, Steve Smith) - 3:30
4. "Civic Hall" - 3:39
5. "Live at the Marquee" - 4:04

Side two

1. "Daylight Titans" - 3:23
2. "Johnny's in Love (Again)" - 3:45
3. "Can't Talk Anymore" - 3:18
4. "Lenina" - 2:46
5. "Silver Machines" - 3:52
6. "Magnets" - 6:14

=== Bonus tracks on 2000 CD remaster ===
12. "Galleries for Guns" - 4:46 [B-side of "Spiders"]
13. "Jimmie Jones" (Single version) - 3:24
14. "Daylight Titans" (Single version) - 3:24 [B-side of "Jimmie Jones"]

== Personnel ==
The Vapors

- David Fenton - rhythm guitar, lead vocals
- Edward Bazalgette - lead guitar
- Steve Smith - bass, backing vocals
- Howard Smith - drums, percussion

Technical

- Robin Lumley - keyboard programming
- Joe Blaney - assistant engineer
