= More Betterness! =

Studio album by No Use for a Name
- Released: October 5, 1999
- Recorded: June 1999
- Genre: Punk rock
- Length: 44:15
- Label: Fat Wreck Chords
- Producers: Ryan Greene; No Use for a Name

No Use for a Name chronology
Making Friends (1997)	More Betterness! (1999)	Hard Rock Bottom (2002)

Singles from More Betterness!
- 1. "Life Size Mirror" Released: 1999

More Betterness! is the fifth studio album by punk rock band No Use for a Name, released in 1999.

"Fairytale of New York" is a cover of the Pogues' original, which features guest vocals from Cinder Block of the band Tilt.

== Release ==
More Betterness! was released in October 1999. No Use for a Name co-headlined the Fat Tour, with the Mad Caddies, in February and March 2000. They embarked on a tour of Australia in June 2000. In November 2001, the band toured Arizona and California with Zero Down, HBA, and Diesel Boy.

== Critical reception ==
Professional ratings
Review scores
Source	Rating
AllMusic	2.5/5 stars
Punknews.org	2/5 stars

Exclaim! wrote that the album "has the requisite guitar harmonics and occasional thrashing drum part, but mostly it is a pop record along the lines of Blink 182." The Los Angeles Times called More Betterness! "the band’s best-regarded full-length." CMJ New Music Report called it "intelligent punk rock" and a "refreshing change of pace." The Washington Post called the album "energetic," but noted that all the songs "tend to sound the same."

== Track listing ==
All songs written by Tony Sly, except where noted.

1. "Not Your Savior" – 3:45
2. "Life Size Mirror" – 3:10
3. "Chasing Rainbows" – 2:49
4. "Lies Can't Pretend" – 2:48
5. "Why Doesn't Anybody Like Me?" – 3:09
6. "Sleeping In" – 3:06
7. "Fairytale of New York" (Jem Finer, Shane MacGowan) – 4:04
8. "Pride" – 3:06
9. "Always Carrie" – 2:46
10. "Let It Slide" – 2:15
11. "Six Degrees from Misty" – 2:39
12. "Coming Too Close" – 3:18
13. "Saddest Song" – 4:00
14. "Room 19" – 3:20

== Personnel ==
No Use for a Name

- Tony Sly - vocals and guitar
- Chris Shiflett – guitar
- Matt Riddle – bass
- Rory Koff – drums

Additional musicians

- Cinder Block - backing vocals on "Fairytale of New York"
