= Cokie the Clown =

EP by NOFX
- Released: November 24, 2009
- Recorded: November 2008 – February 2009 at Motor Studios, San Francisco, CA
- Genre: Punk rock
- Label: Fat Wreck Chords

NOFX chronology
Coaster (2009)	Cokie the Clown (2009)	The Longest EP (2010)

Professional ratings
Review scores
Source	Rating
Alternative Press	4/5 stars
AltSounds	(93%)
Rock Sound	8/10 stars
Robert Christgau	(choice cut)

Cokie the Clown is an EP by NOFX released on November 24, 2009, through Fat Wreck Chords. The EP was released as a single 5-song CD, and two separate 7" vinyl records dubbed Cokie the Clown and My Orphan Year. The tracks on this release were written and recorded during the Coaster sessions. The song "Co-Dependence Day" was previously released on the Warped Tour 2009 Tour Compilation. The album peaked at number 39 on the Billboard Independent Albums.

== Track listings ==
Cokie the Clown CD

1. "Cokie the Clown" – 2:26
2. "Straight Outta Massachusetts" – 1:16
3. "Fermented and Flailing" – 2:40
4. "Co-Dependence Day" – 1:28
5. "My Orphan Year" (acoustic) – 2:58

Cokie the Clown 7"

1. "Cokie the Clown" – 2:26
2. "Co-Dependence Day" – 1:28
3. "Straight Outta Massachusetts" – 1:16

My Orphan Year 7"

1. "My Orphan Year" (acoustic) – 2:58
2. "Fermented and Flailing" – 2:40

== Personnel ==
NOFX

- Fat Mike – vocals, bass, acoustic guitar
- Eric Melvin – guitar, vocals
- El Hefe – guitar, vocals
- Erik Sandin – drums
