= The Feel Good Record of the Year =

Studio album by No Use for a Name
- Released: April 1, 2008
- Recorded: 2007–2008
- Studios: The Blasting Room, Fort Collins, Colorado
- Genres: Punk rock, pop punk, melodic hardcore
- Length: 34:27
- Label: Fat Wreck Chords
- Producer: Bill Stevenson

No Use for a Name chronology
All the Best Songs (2007)	The Feel Good Record of the Year (2008)	Rarities Vol. I: The Covers (2017)

Professional ratings
Review scores
Source	Rating
AbsolutePunk.net	(85%)
AllMusic	3.5/5 stars
Punktastic	4/5 stars

The Feel Good Record of the Year is the eighth and final studio album by punk rock band No Use for a Name. It was recorded in Fort Collins, Colorado, at the Blasting Room with the producers Bill Stevenson & Jason Livermore (Descendents, Rise Against, Good Riddance, 7 Seconds).

== Release ==
On January 20, 2008, The Feel Good Record of the Year was announced for release in three months' time, followed by the track listing three days later. In February and March 2008, the band appeared on the Fat Tour, alongside NOFX and the Flatliners. On February 25, 2008, "Biggest Lie" was posted on the band's Myspace profile, followed by "I Want to Be Wrong" on March 24, 2008. The Feel Good Record of the Year was made available for streaming on March 29, 2008 through their Myspace, before being released four days later. It was promoted with a tour of Europe with support from Far from Finished. The band went on the second leg of the Fat Tour with NOFX and American Steel in May 2008. On May 23, a music video for "Biggest Lie" premiered through Fuse's website. In November 2008, the band went on a short West Coast tour with Pulley. In January and February 2009, the band went on a tour of Europe, which was followed by two shows in Israel with Useless ID. In April 2009, the band embarked on a tour of South America. Following this, they headlined the Fat Canada Tour, which lasted throughout May 2009. In October and November 2009, the band went on a tour of Asia, visiting China, Japan, Indonesia and Malaysia.

This is the final No Use for a Name studio album released before the death of frontman Tony Sly in 2012.

== Track listing ==
All tracks are written by Tony Sly.

No.	Title	Length
1.	"Biggest Lie"	2:11
2.	"I Want to Be Wrong"	2:44
3.	"Yours to Destroy"	3:25
4.	"Under the Garden"	3:01
5.	"Sleeping Between Trucks"	2:05
6.	"Domino"	3:02
7.	"The Feel Good Song of the Year"	3:09
8.	"The Trumpet Player"	3:09
9.	"Night of the Living Living"	2:28
10.	"Ontario"	1:55
11.	"Pacific Standard Time"	2:48
12.	"The Dregs of Sobriety"	2:44
13.	"Kill the Rich"	2:06
14.	"Take It Home"	2:42
Total length:		34:27

== Personnel ==
No Use for a Name

- Tony Sly – Vocals, rhythm guitar
- Matt Riddle – Bass guitar, vocals
- Dave Nassie – Lead guitar
- Rory Koff – Drums

Artwork

- Matt Schwartz – Cover photo
- Gilles Baro – Photography

Additional musicians

- Andrew Berlin – Clarinet, organ, piano
- Jason Livermore – Percussion

Production

- Bill Stevenson – Producer, engineer
- Jason Allen – Engineer
- Jason Livermore – Mastering, audio production, engineer
- Andrew Berlin – Engineer, strings

== Charts ==
Chart (2008)	Peak position
US Top Heatseekers	19
