= Hard Rock Bottom =

Studio album by No Use for a Name
- Released: June 18, 2002
- Recorded: 2002
- Genre: Punk rock, pop punk
- Length: 34:29
- Label: Fat Wreck Chords
- Producer: Ryan Greene, No Use for a Name

No Use for a Name chronology
More Betterness! (1999)	Hard Rock Bottom (2002)	Keep Them Confused (2005)

Professional ratings
Review scores
Source	Rating
AllMusic	3.5/5 stars
Alternative Press	6/10
Sputnikmusic	4/5

Hard Rock Bottom is the sixth studio album by punk rock band No Use for a Name, released on June 16, 2002. The band recorded the album with producer Ryan Greene, in January 2002. Song number nine, "This Is a Rebel Song", features Karina Denike from Dance Hall Crashers. A video for "Dumb Reminders" was released and features the band running from angry fans. "Any Number Can Play" features a quote from the 1997 independent short horror film Coven.

== Release ==
On April 3, 2002, the track listing for Hard Rock Bottom was posted online. Hard Rock Bottom was released on June 18, 2002. On the same day, a music video was released for "Dumb Reminders". Between late June and mid-August, the group went on the 2002 edition of Warped Tour. In October and November 2002, No Use for a Name embarked on a headlining US tour, with support from Yellowcard, Slick Shoes, and the Eyeliners. Later in October, the band performed on The Mike Bullard Show and Off the Record with Michael Landsberg. In February and March 2003, the band toured with Sum 41. In September, the band embarked on a tour of Canada, which was followed by a European tour in October and November; both stints with Bigwig and Irish Car Bomb. On April 16, the band appeared on Last Call with Carson Daly.

== Track listing ==
All songs written by Tony Sly, except where noted.

1. "Feels Like Home" – 1:04
2. "International You Day" – 2:52
3. "Pre-Medicated Murder" – 1:58
4. "Dumb Reminders" – 2:49
5. "Any Number Can Play" – 2:38
6. "Friends of the Enemy" – 3:27
7. "Angela" – 2:45
8. "Let Me Down" – 2:58
9. "This Is a Rebel Song" – 2:24 (Sinéad O'Connor cover)
10. "Solitaire" – 2:46
11. "Undefeated" – 2:54
12. "Insecurity Alert" – 3:11
13. "Nailed Shut" – 2:41

== Personnel ==
- Tony Sly - vocals and guitar
- Dave Nassie – guitar
- Matt Riddle – bass, backing vocals, organ
- Rory Koff – drums
