= Self Entitled =

Studio album by NOFX
- Released: September 11, 2012
- Recorded: April 12–30, 2012
- Studio: The Blasting Room in Fort Collins, Colorado
- Genres: Skate punk; pop-punk
- Length: 29:47
- Label: Fat Wreck Chords
- Producer: Bill Stevenson

NOFX chronology
NOFX (2011)	Self Entitled (2012)	Stoke Extinguisher (2013)

Singles from Self Entitled
- 1. "Ronnie & Mags" Released: August 14, 2012; 2. "Xmas Has Been X'ed" Released: January 15, 2013

Self Entitled is the twelfth studio album by the American punk rock band NOFX. It was released on September 11, 2012, through Fat Wreck Chords.

== Background and production ==
The album took more than a year to materialize. Vocalist and bassist Fat Mike revealed to The Daily Times in January 2011 that a follow-up to Coaster was in production, explaining "There are some really good songs on Coaster, but after having written 300 songs, I feel lucky I came up with them. That's why there are songs on there about Iron Maiden and Tegan and Sara. I'm reaching, man. Sometimes I grab stuff just to grab stuff, and I'm going in a lot of different directions." In December of that year, Fat Mike revealed to Phoenix New Times that he had begun work on a new NOFX album and a soundtrack to a "fetish film" called Rubber Bordello.

On February 14, 2012, Fat Mike revealed to Rolling Stone that NOFX was going to begin recording their twelfth studio album in April and added, "I've got 12 songs, but I don't have a name for it and only a few of the songs are finished. We're demo-ing it right now." On April 12, he posted a message on his Twitter page saying that the band was back in the studio with Bill Stevenson, who produced Wolves in Wolves' Clothing and Coaster. The recording process of Self Entitled was finished in two and a half weeks and it was eventually announced that NOFX would release the album internationally on September 10, 2012 and in the United States on the following day.

In an interview with Punknews.org in October 2012, Fat Mike said that they had recorded 18 songs, but only 12 made the album.

== Singles ==
The album was preceded by two singles which were released on 7" and available digitally exclusively at Fat Wreck's site. The first, "My Stepdad's a Cop and My Stepmom's a Domme", was released on June 19, 2012. It was recorded prior to the album and featured the non-album title track and a different recording of "She Didn't Lose Her Baby". The second, "Ronnie and Mags", was released on August 14, 2012 and featured the album version of the title track and a demo version of "I Believe in Goddess".

== Reception ==
Professional ratings
Aggregate scores
Source	Rating
Metacritic	68/100
Review scores
Source	Rating
AbsolutePunk	(84%)
AllMusic	3/5 stars
Alternative Press	3/5 stars
Consequence of Sound	3/5 stars
Kerrang!	3/5 stars
Popmatters	7/10 stars
Punknews.org	2.5/5 stars
Sputnikmusic	3.5/5

Critical response to Self Entitled has been mixed. Fred Thomas of Allmusic gave it a middling review saying, "There's nothing outstanding here but fans of the band will have no complaints, and for newcomers it's as good a starting point as any, with arguably the same ratio of clever understated brilliance to uninspired mediocrity as any other phase of their discography." On the other hand, Jason Gardner of Absolute Punk gave the album a highly positive review stating that "NOFX take a crack at pressing matters both inwards and outwards, succeeding in not only making a seamless expression of both sides but cranking out some truly memorable jams to boot."

== Track listing ==
All tracks are written by Fat Mike (except "Cell Out", written by Fat Mike and Eric Melvin).

No.	Title	Length
1.	"72 Hookers"	3:36
2.	"I Believe in Goddess"	1:34
3.	"Ronnie & Mags"	2:09
4.	"She Didn't Lose Her Baby"	2:56
5.	"Secret Society"	2:53
6.	"I, Fatty"	1:36
7.	"Cell Out"	2:02
8.	"Down with the Ship"	2:23
9.	"My Sycophant Others"	2:46
10.	"This Machine Is 4"	2:07
11.	"I've Got One Jealous Again, Again"	3:02
12.	"Xmas Has Been X'ed"	2:43
Total length:		29:47

== Personnel ==
NOFX

- Fat Mike – lead vocals, bass
- Eric Melvin – rhythm guitar, backing vocals
- El Hefe – lead guitar, vocals
- Erik Sandin – drums, percussion

Additional Musicians

- Spike Slawson – some backing vocals
- Mike Powell – keyboards

Production

- Bill Stevenson – producer

Engineers

- Jamie McMann
