= New Clear Days =

1980 studio album by the Vapors

Studio album by The Vapors
- Released: 7 June 1980
- Recorded: 1979–1980
- Studios: Basing Street, London; Roundhouse, London; The Town House, London
- Genres: New wave; power pop
- Length: 40:33
- Labels: United Artists (original), RT Industries (current)
- Producer: Vic Coppersmith-Heaven

The Vapors chronology
New Clear Days (1980)	Magnets (1981)

Singles from New Clear Days
- 1. "Turning Japanese" Released: January 1980

Professional ratings
Review scores
Source	Rating
Allmusic	4.5/5 stars
Smash Hits	8/10

New Clear Days is the 1980 debut album by the British rock group The Vapors. It spent six weeks in the UK album charts, reaching a highest position of No. 44 in June 1980. It contains their best-known song, "Turning Japanese", which reached No. 3 in the UK chart in February 1980 and was also a worldwide success. A remix of "News at Ten" (named after the well-known ITV news programme), went to No. 44 in July of that year. A third single, a re-recording of "Waiting for the Weekend" that included a horn section, failed to chart.

== Song details ==
"News at Ten", a cynical examination of the generation gap and the narrator's fear of ending up as complacent as the parent he despises for his conformism, was expected to be a hit on the back of the success of "Turning Japanese". Its poorer performance was blamed in part by the long-running strike at the BBC's Top of the Pops, which meant it received very little media exposure. There was also a marked reluctance by BBC Radio 1 - then the nation's premier radio station - to play a song named after an ITV programme.

Apart from the three singles, the other best known track is "Sixty Second Interval". Its ambiguous lyrics have been interpreted as concerning the short ceasefires agreed upon between armies during wars to allow each to attend to their wounded in the no man's land between them. The song was the inspiration for the long-running "Sixty Second Interview" feature of the UK's free Metro newspaper given away at public transport stations.

"Letter from Hiro", the album's lengthy finale, concerns the sense of powerlessness a boy feels as events push towards World War II, and towards the inevitable ending of his friendship with his more patriotic Japanese pen pal ("And when the sun was rising somewhere in the East, and when a flag meant more to Hiro than to me"). The song concludes with the playing of a traditional Japanese tune on a cimbalom.

== Releases ==
The American and Canadian releases omitted both "Cold War" and "America" in favour of the single "Prisoners". The U.S. album was released on CD twice: in 1995 as Anthology, by One Way Records, with four tracks from their second album, Magnets, as bonus tracks; and in 1998 as Vaporized, by Collectables Records, which included the Magnets album on the same CD. The 1996 best-of album Turning Japanese: The Best of the Vapors contained ten of the UK album's original 11 tracks, plus the single remix of "News at Ten".

In 2000, Captain Mod Records, an offshoot of the Captain Oi! label, specialising in punk rock and new wave bands, reissued both of the band's albums on CD, separately. New Clear Days featured the original UK LP track listing for the first time on CD, and included all single mixes and B-sides the band recorded for the album as bonus tracks. The CD reissue of New Clear Days was remastered by Tim Turan and, while some of the bonus tracks had previously been issued on Turning Japanese: The Best of the Vapors (1996), many of the tracks made their debut on CD for the first time. The booklet included a brief essay on the band's history as well as the lyrics for all the songs on the album.

In October 2021, New Clear Days was reissued on vinyl for the first time since 1980 by British label Demon Records, on split black and yellow vinyl and based on the 2000 remasters.

== Track listing ==
=== Original European, Australasian and South African LP release ===
- All songs written by David Fenton (EMI Music Publishing, Ltd.).

Side one

1. "Spring Collection" - 2:52
2. "Turning Japanese" - 3:44
3. "Cold War" - 3:57
4. "America" - 2:22
5. "Trains" - 3:26
6. "Bunkers" - 3:54

Side two

1. "News at Ten" - 3:18
2. "Somehow" - 3:33
3. "Sixty Second Interval" - 3:52
4. "Waiting for the Weekend" - 3:07
5. "Letter from Hiro" - 6:23

==== Bonus tracks on 2000 CD remaster ====
12. "Prisoners" - 2:55
13. "Sunstroke" - 1:57 [B-side of "Prisoners"]
14. "Here Comes the Judge" (Live) - 6:34 [B-side of "Turning Japanese"]
15. "News at Ten" (Single Version) - 3:21 [Remixed]
16. "Wasted" - 2:48 [B-side of "News at Ten"]
17. "Talk Talk" - 3:55 [B-side of "News at Ten"]
18. "Waiting for the Weekend" (Single Version) - 3:03 [Re-recording]
19. "Billy" - 5:58 [B-side of "Waiting for the Weekend"]

=== Original North American LP release ===
Side one

1. "Turning Japanese" - 3:40
2. "Sixty Second Interval" - 3:50
3. "Waiting for the Weekend" - 3:04
4. "Spring Collection" - 2:52
5. "Letter from Hiro" - 6:22

Side two

1. "News at Ten" - 3:18
2. "Somehow" - 3:32
3. "Prisoners" - 2:52
4. "Trains" - 3:26
5. "Bunkers" - 3:53

== Charts ==
Chart (1980)	Position
Australia (Kent Music Report)	24
Canada (RPM (magazine))	44
New Zealand (RIANZ)	25
United Kingdom (Official Charts Company)	44
United States (Billboard 200)	62

== Personnel ==
The Vapors

- David Fenton - lead vocals, rhythm guitar
- Edward Bazalgette - lead guitar
- Steve Smith - bass, backing vocals
- Howard Smith - drums, percussion

Technical

- Alan Douglas, Andy Lyden, Trevor Hallesy - engineer
- John Pasche - art direction
