= Don't Miss the Train =

Studio album by No Use for a Name
- Released: October 23, 1992
- Recorded: The Music Annex, Menlo Park, California in 1991
- Genre: Melodic hardcore
- Length: 28:48
- Label: New Red Archives
- Producer: No Use for a Name, Pat Coughlin

No Use for a Name chronology
Incognito (1990)	Don't Miss the Train (1992)	The Daily Grind (1993)

Alternate cover by Artist, Mark deSalvo
- Cover of the re-release on Fat Wreck Chords

Professional ratings
Review scores
Source	Rating
AllMusic	3/5 stars

Don't Miss the Train is the second full-length album released by punk band No Use for a Name in 1992. It was re-released on Fat Wreck Chords on October 23, 2001, with different artwork by artist, Mark deSalvo.

== Track listing ==
All songs written by No Use for a Name.

1. "Born Addicted" – 2:40
2. "Thorn in My Side" – 2:18
3. "Looney Toon" – 1:50
4. "TollBridge" – 2:39
5. "Hole" – 1:56
6. "Another Step" – 2:18
7. "Don't Miss the Train" – 2:55
8. "Watching" – 3:04
9. "Punk Points" – 1:56
10. "Tan in a Can" – 2:00
11. "Death Doesn't Care" – 3:21
12. "Get Out of This Town" – 1:55

== Personnel ==
Personnel taken from Don't Miss the Train liner notes.

No Use For A Name

- Tony Sly – vocals, lead guitar
- Chris Dodge – rhythm guitar
- Steve Papoutsis – bass, vocals
- Rory Koff – drums

Production

- No Use for a Name – producer
- Pat Coughlin – producer, engineer
- Lance Smithers – second engineer
