= Turning Japanese =

1980 single by the Vapors

- Standard European picture sleeve

Single by the Vapors

from the album New Clear Days
- B-side: "Talk Talk" (USA/Canada) "Here Comes the Judge" (live) (international)
- Released: January 1980
- Genre: New wave; power pop
- Length: 3:40 (album version); 3:19 (7" edit)
- Label: United Artists
- Songwriter: David Fenton
- Producer: Vic Coppersmith-Heaven

The Vapors singles chronology
"Prisoners" (1979)	"Turning Japanese" (1980)	"News at Ten" (1980)

Music video
- "Turning Japanese" on YouTube

Audio sample
- file; help

"Turning Japanese" is a song by the English band the Vapors, from their 1980 album New Clear Days. It was an international hit, and the band's best-known song. The song prominently features the Oriental riff played on guitar.

== Composition and recording ==
The songwriter, David Fenton, intended the song to be a love song, with the character of the song "pining over a photograph of his ex-girlfriend" in his bedroom, drawing from Fenton's own experience of being rejected. Fenton wrote the song in his flat, but had problems writing the chorus. He said that the chorus then came to him suddenly when he woke up at 4 a.m. with the lyric "Turning Japanese, I think I'm turning Japanese" in his head, and he used it even though the words and the song title did not "really mean much".

The song was produced by Vic Coppersmith-Heaven, who had previously rejected a request to produce for the band after listening to demos sent to him by the band's managers, John Weller (father of Paul Weller) and Bruce Foxton. The band's unsuccessful first single, "Prisoners", was therefore produced by someone else. Coppersmith-Heaven later had another listen to the demos and agreed to produce "Turning Japanese" for them. He proposed several changes to the arrangement of the song, which were made. He recorded the Vapors live to capture the energy of the band, before stripping it down to just the drums, and then overdubbed the song. According to Fenton, the drummer did not like the song and "just went 'Boom! Splat!'" in the recording, but the band thought it sounded good and kept it.

The band suspected they would score a hit with "Turning Japanese", even delaying its release to make it their second single, hoping to avoid becoming "one-hit wonders". Nonetheless, they never matched the single's success. In Australia, it spent two weeks at No. 1 during June 1980. The music video was directed by Russell Mulcahy.

== Reception ==
The music video was among the first 200 played on MTV. It received heavy rotation, giving the song more exposure than mere radio airplay. Kirsten Dunst recorded a cover, with an accompanying video filmed and directed by McG and produced by Takashi Murakami in Tokyo in August 2009. On the Canadian sketch comedy series Second City Television, Rick Moranis performed a lounge-style version of the song as the character Tom Monroe.

== Charts ==
=== Weekly charts ===
Chart (1980–1981)	Peak position
Australia (Kent Music Report)	1
Canada Top Singles (RPM)	6
Ireland (IRMA)	4
New Zealand (Recorded Music NZ)	9
UK Singles (Official Charts)	3
US Billboard Hot 100	36
US Billboard Hot Dance Club Play	34
US Cash Box	31
US Record World	40

=== Year-end charts ===
Chart (1980)	Rank
Australia (Kent Music Report)	2
Canada Top Singles (RPM)	93
UK Singles (OCC)	39

Chart (1981)	Rank
Canada Top Singles (RPM)	94

== Certifications and sales ==
Region	Certification	Certified units/sales
Australia (ARIA)	Platinum	100,000^{^}
United Kingdom (BPI)	Silver	250,000^{^}
^{^} Shipments figures based on certification alone.

== See also ==
- List of number-one singles in Australia during the 1980s
