= Making Friends (album) =

Studio album by No Use for a Name
- Released: August 19, 1997
- Recorded: Motor Studios, San Francisco, California
- Genre: Punk rock, melodic hardcore, skate punk
- Length: 35:31
- Label: Fat Wreck Chords
- Producer: Ryan Greene; No Use for a Name

No Use for a Name chronology
¡Leche con Carne! (1995)	Making Friends (1997)	More Betterness! (1999)

Professional ratings
Review scores
Source	Rating
AllMusic	3/5 stars

Making Friends is the fourth studio album by punk rock band No Use for a Name, released in 1997. It also includes a hidden track cover of the Kiss song "Beth". At the end of "Beth" the band starts to play "Soulmate" but gets interrupted by Tony Sly. "Fields of Athenry" is an Irish folk ballad (written in 1970 by Pete St. John) which has been covered by many other bands such as Dropkick Murphys & The Dubliners.

== Track listing ==
All songs written by No Use For A Name except "Fields Of Athenry".

1. "The Answer Is Still No" – 2:33 (Opening dialogue between Alec Baldwin and Ed Harris from the film Glengarry Glen Ross)
2. "Invincible" – 2:22
3. "Growing Down" – 2:02
4. "On the Outside" – 2:51 (Opening dialogue is David Thewlis from the film Naked)
5. "A Postcard Would Be Nice" – 2:01
6. "Secret" – 3:24
7. "Best Regards" – 1:50
8. "Revenge" – 1:52
9. "Sidewalk" – 2:17
10. "3 Month Weekend" – 1:17
11. "Sitting Duck" – 1:21
12. "Fields of Athenry" – 11:40

== Personnel ==
- Tony Sly – vocals, guitar
- Chris Shiflett – guitar, vocals
- Matt Riddle – bass, vocals
- Rory Koff – drums
- Dicky Barrett – vocals on Growing Down
- Karina Deniké – vocals on On the Outside
