= The Vapors =

English music group

- The Vapors, 1980. Left to right: Edward Bazalgette, David Fenton, Steve Smith, Howard Smith

Background information
- Origin: Guildford, Surrey, England
- Genres: New wave; power pop
- Years active: 1978–1982; 2016–present
- Labels: United Artists; Liberty; RT Industries; Elektra
- Members: David Fenton; Steve Smith; Michael Bowes; Danny Fenton
- Past members: Edward Bazalgette; Howard Smith; Michael Hedges; Michael Jordan; Robert Kemp; Bob Heard; Steve Hampton
- Website: thevapors.co.uk

The Vapors are an English new wave and power pop band formed in Guildford, active from 1978 to 1982 before reforming in 2016. They are best known for their 1980 hit single, "Turning Japanese", which reached No. 3 on the UK singles chart and No. 36 on the US Billboard Hot 100.

== Career ==
=== 1978–1982 ===
Based in Guildford, Surrey, an early version of the group were playing at The Three Lions pub in Farncombe when The Jam's bassist Bruce Foxton spotted them. The group's line-up stabilised with David Fenton (lead vocals, rhythm guitar), Howard Smith (drums), Edward Bazalgette (lead guitar) and Steve Smith (bass). Howard Smith and Steve Smith were not related. The group were originally named The Vapours but had removed the "u" to help garner more attention in America. Foxton then offered the group a few shows and agreed to jointly-manage them with John Weller (father of Paul Weller). The Vapors were then offered a slot supporting The Jam on the Setting Sons tour in 1979.

The group signed to United Artists, releasing their first single, "Prisoners", at the end of 1979, but it failed to chart. Their second single, "Turning Japanese", is the song for which they are best remembered. The track was produced by The Jam's producer Vic Coppersmith-Heaven and reached number 3 in the UK and number 1 in Australia. It was also a top-ten hit in Canada and New Zealand and reached the top 40 in the United States. "Turning Japanese" was believed to euphemistically refer to masturbation, although Fenton (the song's writer) denied that claim in an interview on VH1. He did, however, say he wished to thank whoever first came up with that interpretation, as he felt the salacious rumour about what the song 'really' meant may have been what made it a hit. The follow-up singles "News at Ten" and "Jimmie Jones" both peaked at number 44 in the UK Singles Chart.

The group released two albums; New Clear Days (1980) and Magnets (1981). New Clear Days contained "Turning Japanese" and displayed a new wave sound with socially-conscious lyrics. That album reached the middle of the charts in the UK, Canada, and US. Magnets revealed a power pop sound and darker lyrics, with the song "Jimmie Jones" making reference to cult leader Jim Jones. That album sold poorly and the band broke up in 1982. Fenton alleged in a later interview with Record Collector magazine that lack of record label support was the chief reason for the band's split, while a planned single release was cancelled without explanation.

After the Vapors broke up, David Fenton joined the legal profession in the early 1990s, concentrating on the legal aspects of the music industry, and from 1999 he worked as a London-based in-house solicitor for the Musicians' Union. Edward Bazalgette became a television director; his credits include a 2005 BBC documentary about Genghis Khan and two episodes of Doctor Who in 2015. For many years Howard Smith ran an independent record shop, People Records in Guildford, the band's home town. Steve Smith formed the band Shoot!Dispute, which appeared in John Peel sessions, and toured in support of Bruce Foxton; and later joined the rap/rock band 1ST.

=== 2016–present ===
After 34 years of inactivity, David Fenton, Ed Bazalgette, and Steve Smith appeared on stage at the Half Moon in Putney on 30 April 2016. With a guest drummer standing in for Howard Smith, they played "Turning Japanese" and then left the stage. Rumors of a reunion were rife, and the Vapors completed a four-date tour in October–November 2016 with Michael Bowes on drums. The Vapors continued with six more concerts in 2017 and 10 in 2018. That included three dates in New York City with David Fenton's son, Danny, standing in for Ed Bazalgette on lead guitar, where they played several new tracks, including "Sundown River", "Letter to Hiro (No11)", "The Right Stuff", "One of My Dreams", and "King L".

As of 2017, the band's catalogue masters are controlled by Razor & Tie Industries, which acquired them from Warner Music Group, whose Alternative Distribution Alliance serves as RT Industries' worldwide distributor when RT was newly launched in 2018. On 21 April 2018, they re-released "Turning Japanese" on red vinyl with bonus tracks for Record Store Day.

In April 2019, the band was announced as the support to From the Jam on the 30-date Setting Sons 40th Anniversary tour. The Vapors had been the opening act for The Jam on the original 1979 Setting Sons tour. Bazalgette left the band around that time and was replaced by Danny Fenton.

On 3 March 2020, the Vapors announced that they would be releasing a new album, Together, and issued "Crazy" as its lead single. Together was released on 15 May. It was the first album from the Vapors in 39 years, marking one of the longest gaps between studio albums.

On 30 August, "Girl from the Factory", the third single from the album, reached number one on the United DJs Heritage Chart. Follow-up single "Wonderland" also reached the top of the Heritage Charts on 22 November.

The band celebrated their top-selling album by going out on the New Clear Days 40th Anniversary Tour in 2021. The download-only singles "One of My Dreams Came True" (2021), "Novocaine" (2022), and "Eyes on the Prize" (2024) all reached the Heritage Chart top ten, maintaining the band profile.

On 2 September 2022 the band returned to their Guildford roots to play at the town's Suburbs Holroyd Arms.

In January 2023, a US show was announced: the band played at the Cruel World Festival in Pasadena, California on 20 May 2023.

In August 2024, the band announced plans to crowdfund the production of their fourth album. The album, Wasp in a Jar, was released on 28 February.

In May 2025, former drummer Howard Smith was elected Mayor of Guildford.

== Discography ==
=== Studio albums ===
Title	Album details	Peak chart positions				
Title	Album details	UK	AUS	CAN	NZ	US
New Clear Days	Release date: June 1980; Label: United Artists Records; Formats: LP, cassette	44	24	41	25	62
Magnets	Release date: 9 March 1981; Label: Liberty Records; Formats: LP, cassette	—	—	39	—	109
Together	Release date: 15 May 2020; Label: Manmade Soul; Formats: LP, CD	87	—	—	—	—
Wasp in a Jar	Release date: 28 February 2025; Label: Universal UK; Formats: LP, CD	—	—	—	—	—
"—" denotes releases that did not chart

=== Compilation albums ===
Title	Album details
Anthology	Release date: 30 May 1995; Label: One Way Records; Formats: CD, cassette
Turning Japanese: The Best of the Vapors	Release date: 1996; Label: EMI Records; Formats: CD, cassette
Vaporized	Release date: 7 April 1998; Label: Collectables; Formats: CD, cassette
The Best of the Vapors	Release date: 5 August 2003; Label: EMI Records; Formats: CD

=== Singles ===
Year	Single	Peak chart positions							Certifications (sales threshold)	Album
Year	Single	UK	AUS	CAN	NZ	US	US Dance	US Main	Certifications (sales threshold)	Album
1979	"Prisoners"	—	—	—	—	—	—	—		Non-album single
1980	"Turning Japanese"	3	1	7	9	36	34	—	UK: Silver; ARIA: Platinum	New Clear Days
1980	"News at Ten"	44	—	—	—	—	—	—		New Clear Days
1981	"Waiting for the Weekend"	—	—	—	—	—	—	—		New Clear Days
1981	"Spiders"	—	—	—	—	—	—	—		Magnets
1981	"Jimmie Jones"	44	—	—	—	—	—	39		Magnets
2020	"Crazy"	—	—	—	—	—	—	—		Together
2020	"Together"	—	—	—	—	—	—	—		Together
2020	"Girl from the Factory"	—	—	—	—	—	—	—		Together
2020	"Wonderland"	—	—	—	—	—	—	—		Together
2021	"One of My Dreams"	—	—	—	—	—	—	—		Non-album singles
2022	"Novocaine"	—	—	—	—	—	—	—		Non-album singles
2023	"Hey Baby It's Christmas" (Live)	—	—	—	—	—	—	—		Non-album singles
2024	"Eyes On the Prize"	—	—	—	—	—	—	—		Non-album singles
2025	"Hit the Ground Running"	—	—	—	—	—	—	—		Wasp in a Jar
2025	"The Human Race"	—	—	—	—	—	—	—		Wasp in a Jar
2025	"Forever & Ever"	—	—	—	—	—	—	—		Wasp in a Jar
2025	"Nothing Can Stop Us Now"	—	—	—	—	—	—	—		Wasp in a Jar
"—" denotes releases that did not chart
