= The Daily Grind (EP) =

EP by No Use for a Name
- Released: May 31, 1993
- Recorded: Music Annex Studios
- Genre: Skate punk, melodic hardcore
- Length: 21:56
- Label: Fat Wreck Chords
- Producer: Don Cameron, Fat Mike, Pat Coughlin

No Use for a Name chronology
Don't Miss the Train (1992)	The Daily Grind (1993)	¡Leche con Carne! (1995)

Professional ratings
Review scores
Source	Rating
AllMusic	4/5 stars

The Daily Grind is an EP by punk rock band No Use for a Name released in 1993. It was the band's first release for Fat Wreck Chords.

== Track listing ==
All songs written by No Use for a Name.

1. "Until It's Gone" – 3:50
2. "Old What's His Name" – 2:18
3. "Permanent Rust" – 2:31
4. "Biomag" – 1:30
5. "Countdown" – 3:52
6. "Hazardous to Yourself" – 3:05
7. "The Daily Grind" – 2:21
8. "Feeding the Fire" – 2:27

== Personnel ==
No Use for a Name

- Tony Sly – vocals, guitar
- Rory Koff – drums
- Robin Pfefer – lead guitar
- Steve Papoutsis – bass, backing vocals

Additional musicians

- The Slothe Chorus – backing and harmony vocals
- Fat Mike – backing vocals
- Stan Ballard – backing vocals

Technical personnel

- Pat Coughlin – production, engineering
- Fat Mike – production
- Don Cameron – production
- Stan Ballard – engineering assistance
- Ken Lee – mastering
- Chris McGraw – photography
- Jimbo Phillips – cover art
- Nick Rubenstein – graphic art
