= ¡Leche con Carne! =

¡Leche Con Carne!

Studio album by No Use for a Name
- Released: February 15, 1995
- Recorded: 1994
- Studio: The Razor's Edge, San Francisco, California
- Genre: Skate punk
- Length: 35:25
- Label: Fat Wreck Chords
- Producer: Fat Mike; Ryan Greene

No Use for a Name chronology
The Daily Grind (1993)	¡Leche Con Carne! (1995)	Making Friends (1997)

Singles from ¡Leche con carne!
- 1. "Soulmate" Released: 1995; 2. "Straight From The Jacket" Released: 1995

Professional ratings
Review scores
Source	Rating
Allmusic	3.5/5 stars
Punknews.org	5/5 stars

¡Leche Con Carne! the third studio album by punk rock band No Use for a Name, released in 1995. The album title is Spanish for "milk with meat".

== Background ==
The band gained critical recognition for this album and supported the Offspring on the Smash tour. After this tour, guitarist Ed Gregor and bassist Steve Papoutsis left No Use for a Name and would be replaced by Chris Shiflett and Matt Riddle on guitar and bass respectively.

The final track, after three minutes of silence, features a covers medley of the Cars' "Just What I Needed", Green Day's "Basket Case", Missing Persons' "Words", Berlin's "The Metro", David Bowie's "Space Oddity", Toni Basil's "Mickey", the Knack's "My Sharona", Twisted Sister's "We're Not Gonna Take It", Pat Benatar's "Hit Me with Your Best Shot", Yes's "Owner of a Lonely Heart" and Aerosmith's "Walk This Way".

== Track listing ==
All tracks are written by Tony Sly, except where noted

No.	Title	Length
1.	"Justified Black Eye"	2:39
2.	"Couch Boy"	2:11
3.	"Soulmate"	3:07
4.	"51 Days"	2:13
5.	"Leave It Behind"	2:47
6.	"Redemption Song" (Bob Marley)	2:38
7.	"Straight from the Jacket"	2:21
8.	"Fields of Agony"	2:24
9.	"Fatal Flu"	2:30
10.	"Wood"	1:25
11.	"Alone"	2:09
12.	"Exit"	3:38

== Personnel ==
Personnel taken from ¡Leche Con Carne! liner notes.

No Use for a Name

- Tony Sly – vocals, guitar
- Ed Gregor – lead guitar
- Steve Papoutsis – bass
- Rory Koff – drums

Additional performers

- The Slothe Chorus – backing and harmony vocals
- El Hefe – backing and harmony vocals
- Jordan – backing and harmony vocals
- Elijah – backing and harmony vocals
- Jen D. – backing and harmony vocals
- Erin – backing and harmony vocals

Production

- No Use for a Name – production
- Fat Mike – production
- Ryan Greene – production, engineering
- Eddy Schreyer – mastering
