= Matt Riddle (musician) =

- Born: April 5, 1967 (age 58)
- Instrument: Bass

Matt Riddle (born April 5, 1967 ) is an American punk rock bassist. He was the original bass player for Face to Face, which was founded in Victorville, California in the early 1990s. After the band's 2nd album Big Choice was released in 1995, Riddle parted ways with Face to Face due to personal conflicts with singer/guitarist Trever Keith.

He then joined No Use for a Name in 1996 after the band's fourth full-length, Leche Con Carne (1995), and made his recording debut on the band's Making Friends record in 1997.

He also played briefly for the punk bands Pulley and 22 Jacks.

Riddle and Keith have reportedly reconciled their differences, and Riddle provided liner notes for a Face to Face collection entitled Shoot the Moon in 2005. Riddle was not, however, part of the Face to Face reunion in 2008.

On December 3, 2010 No Use for a Name notified fans through their Myspace page that Riddle had been hospitalized with severe pancreatitis. He had his gallbladder removed and was eventually released from the hospital.

On August 1, 2012, No Use for a Name frontman Tony Sly was reported dead at age 41, putting an end to the band's career.

Riddle currently resides in the Victorville area with his family.

On February 20, 2015, punk supergroup Implants announced on Facebook that Matt Riddle had joined the band.

In mid 2020 during the pandemic, Christopher Swinney formerly of The Ataris announced that Matt Riddle had joined his new band, Fire Sale.
