= Tony Sly =

American singer-songwriter (1970–2012)

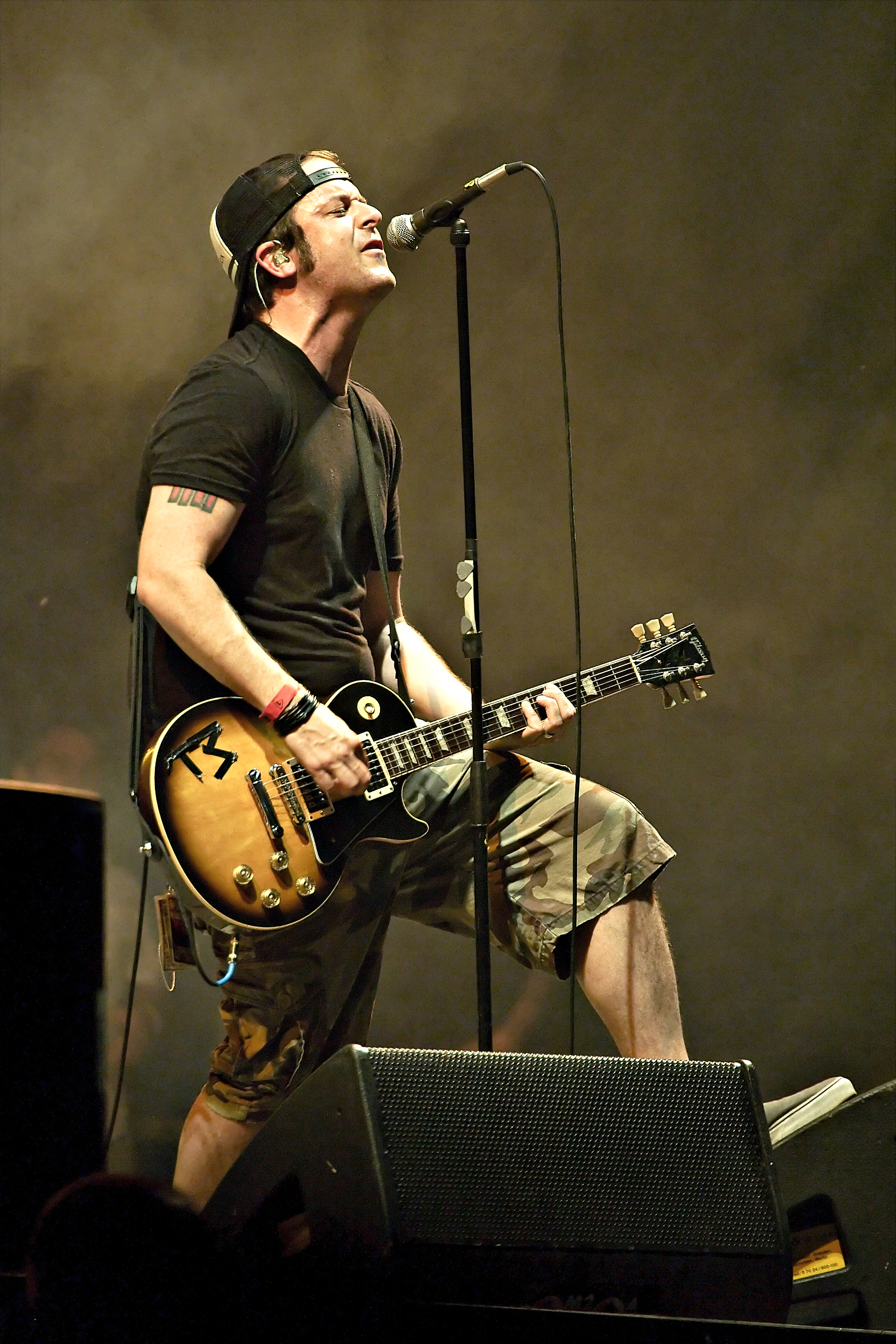
- Sly performing in 2009

Background information
- Born: Anthony James Sly; November 4, 1970; Mountain View, California
- Died: July 31, 2012 (aged 41) San Jose, California
- Genres: Punk rock, melodic hardcore, skate punk, pop punk, acoustic
- Occupations: Musician, singer-songwriter
- Instruments: Vocals, Guitar
- Years active: 1986–2012
- Label: Fat Wreck Chords

Anthony James Sly (November 4, 1970 – July 31, 2012) was an American singer, songwriter and guitarist, best known as the lead singer and lead guitarist of the punk rock band No Use for a Name. In his later years he also gained attention for his acoustic solo work, with two acoustic split albums he released with Lagwagon front man Joey Cape and two solo albums.

== Early life and education ==
Tony Sly was born at the El Camino Hospital in Mountain View, California on November 4, 1970, to parents John and Pauline Sly. He had two brothers, Jonathan and Michael Sly. Sly attended Montclaire Elementary School, followed by Cupertino Junior High School and Homestead High School in Cupertino, California. He was married to Brigitte Sly and had two daughters, Fiona Sly and Keira Sly.

== Professional career ==
Tony Sly joined No Use for a Name as lead guitarist in 1986. He later took on vocal duties full-time in 1989 when previous vocalist Chris Dodge left the band. Their first album Incognito was released in 1990 on the label New Red Archives and featured a heavy but melodic hardcore punk sound. The band's second album Don't Miss the Train was released in 1992 and featured a much more melodic hardcore sound.

The band's third album ¡Leche con Carne!, which was released in 1995, was their debut on the Fat Wreck Chords label, though they released an EP titled The Daily Grind on the label in 1993. The album marked a change of musical style going from hardcore punk more into punk rock and skate punk. Also in 1993, guitarist Robin Pfefer replaced Chris Dodge and took the position of the lead guitarist, allowing Tony Sly to focus on singing and playing rhythm guitar instead.

In 2004, Tony Sly, along with Lagwagon front man Joey Cape released a split acoustic album. Acoustic was released on May 18, 2004, through Fat Wreck Chords and featured 12 tracks: acoustic renditions of No Use for a Name and Lagwagon songs performed by each respective member, along with two new exclusive tracks, one by each member.

On July 10, 2007, No Use for a Name released a best of compilation, titled All the Best Songs. The compilation marked the band's 20th anniversary together and included 24 previously released remastered singles, plus two previously unreleased songs.

Sly went on his first solo acoustic tour in March 2009. On February 16, 2010, 12 Song Program (produced by Jamie McMann), Tony Sly's first album as a solo acoustic artist was released through Fat Wreck Chords. On February 6, 2010, Sly started his solo tour in support of the album with a few North American dates, where he was joined by former No Use for a Name bandmate Chris Shiflett. On February 17, 2010, Sly started his first solo European tour, where he toured alongside Lagwagon's Joey Cape and Drag the River's Jon Snodgrass, until March 10, 2010. Tony Sly spent the rest of the spring touring in support of NOFX and Teenage Bottlerocket on their co-headline tour, then joining Joey Cape on a short Australian tour in the summer.

Sly was due to record the next No Use for a Name album in late 2010, for a spring 2011 release. It would have been the first new album from the band since 2008's The Feel Good Record of the Year. These plans were pushed back when Sly decided to record a second solo album.

In December 2010, Sly announced that he was in the studio recording songs for a Japanese split EP. On December 29, 2010, he commented that the Japanese split EP songs came out well, and that he was gathering material for a new full-length solo album.

In January 2011, Sly finished writing for his next solo album. He entered the studio later that month to start recording. He described the album's sound as being "sad". By February 2011, Sly had recorded 17 songs for his album and decided to take a break from the studio to play some solo acoustic shows and road-test some new songs. In March 2011, Sly announced that he was going back to the studio with producer Jamie McMann. Between April 7–18, 2011 and May 31 – June 6, he played two short Canadian tours in support of his second solo album. In June 2011, The mixing process for his second solo album, titled Sad Bear, had begun.

On September 28, 2011, Sly released "Devonshire and Crown", the first single from Sad Bear, for free streaming through Alternative Press, AbsolutePunk and the official Fat Wreck Chords website. Sad Bear was released on October 11, 2011, through Fat Wreck Chords.

Sly's final solo show took place in Gainesville, Florida on July 29, 2012. His last show with No Use for a Name took place at the D-Tox Rockfest in Montebello, Quebec on June 15, 2012.

== Death ==
On July 31, 2012, Sly died in his sleep at age 41.

On September 8, 2012, when the surviving members of No Use for a Name played a show at the Envol et Macadam festival in Quebec City, Quebec in honor of Sly, bassist Matt Riddle confirmed that the band was splitting up.

In November 2013, Fat Wreck Chords released The Songs of Tony Sly: A Tribute, a tribute album featuring artists doing their own takes on Tony Sly and No Use for a Name songs. Artists on this album include Get Dead, NOFX, The Bouncing Souls, Snuff, Joey Cape, Strung Out, Alkaline Trio, Simple Plan, Gaslight Anthem, Teenage Bottlerocket, Yellowcard, Mad Caddies, Rise Against, The Flatliners, Lagwagon, Bad Religion, Frank Turner and Pennywise.

Multiple bands and artists have released songs honoring Sly as a close friend and inspiration including NOFX ("I'm So Sorry Tony"), Lagwagon ("One More Song") and Useless ID-frontman Yotam Ben Horin ("Tony Sly"). Additionally Sly's vocals are posthumously featured on the album version of the musical Home Street Home which was written by NOFX bassist and vocalist Fat Mike.

== Discography ==
Solo

- 2004 – Acoustic (with Joey Cape)
- 2010 – Tony Sly / Joey Cape Split 7" (with Joey Cape)
- 2010 – 12 Song Program
- 2011 – Sad Bear
- 2012 – Acoustic Volume 2 (with Joey Cape)

Scorpios

- 2011 – Scorpios
