= List of songs recorded by Black Flag =

This is a list of songs recorded by the American hardcore punk band Black Flag.

• This list does not include any alternate or live versions of songs.

• The song "Crass Commercialism" from the compilation album Everything Went Black, is not included, as it is a collection of radio advertisements for Black Flag shows.

• The six spoken word songs from Family Man are not included.

• The Minutemen collaboration EP Minuteflag is also not included.

• This list is ranked in rough chronological order, although it includes the most prominent recordings of each song. For instance, the most famous versions of the songs "Six Pack" and "Damaged I", are on Damaged. However, they were both previously released (as alternate versions) on their third EP and first single respectively.

• Similarly, several songs, specifically from their second and fourth albums, were performed live earlier and recorded in demo form prior to having been officially released.

== List ==
| # | Song | Publication | Composer | Notes |
|---|---|---|---|---|
| 01. | "Nervous Breakdown" | Nervous Breakdown (EP) | Greg Ginn | Sung by Keith Morris. |
| 02. | "Fix Me" | Nervous Breakdown (EP) | Greg Ginn | Sung by Keith Morris. |
| 03. | "I've Had It" | Nervous Breakdown (EP) | Greg Ginn | Sung by Keith Morris. |
| 04. | "Wasted" | Nervous Breakdown (EP) | Greg Ginn, Keith Morris | Sung by Keith Morris. Keith Morris sings an alternate version on Everything Went Black. |
| 05. | "I Don't Care" | Everything Went Black | Greg Ginn, Keith Morris | Re-recorded as "You Bet We've Got Something Personal Against You!" Sung by Keith Morris. |
| 06. | "Jealous Again" | Jealous Again | Greg Ginn | Sung by Ron Reyes, although a demo with Keith Morris singing was recorded previously. This can be found on the compilation of demos Everything Went Black. |
| 07. | "Revenge" | Jealous Again | Greg Ginn | Sung by Ron Reyes, although a demo with Keith Morris singing was recorded previously. This can be found on the compilation of demos Everything Went Black. |
| 08. | "White Minority" | Jealous Again | Greg Ginn | Sung by Ron Reyes, although a demo with Keith Morris singing was recorded previously. This can be found on the compilation of demos Everything Went Black. |
| 09. | "No Values" | Jealous Again | Greg Ginn | Sung by Ron Reyes, although a demo with Keith Morris singing was recorded previously. This can be found on the compilation of demos Everything Went Black. |
| 10. | "You Bet We've Got Something Personal Against You!" | Jealous Again | Greg Ginn | A re-recorded version of "I Don't Care", was the first to be released. Sung by Chuck Dukowski. |
| 11. | "Louie Louie" | Louie Louie | Richard Berry | A cover of the original song written by Richard Berry, this is the only cover song in Black Flag's catalogue. Sung by Dez Cadena. An alternate version also sung by Dez Cadena appears on Everything Went Black. |
| 12. | "I've Heard It Before" | Six Pack (EP) | Greg Ginn, Chuck Dukowski | Sung by Dez Cadena. |
| 13. | "American Waste" | Six Pack (EP) | Chuck Dukowski | Sung by Dez Cadena. |
| 14. | "Clocked In" | The First Four Years | Greg Ginn | Sung by Dez Cadena, although demo versions sung by Keith Morris and Ron Reyes appear on Everything Went Black. Originally appeared on the New Alliance Records compilation album "Cracks in the Sidewalk". |
| 15. | "Machine" | The First Four Years | Chuck Dukowski, Dez Cadena | Sung by Dez Cadena. Originally appeared on the New Alliance Records compilation album "Chunks". |
| 16. | "Rise Above" | Damaged | Greg Ginn | Sung by Henry Rollins, as is every song from this point of the list up to and including "Kicking 'N Sticking". |
| 17. | "Spray Paint" | Damaged | Greg Ginn, Chuck Dukowski | |
| 18. | "Six Pack" | Damaged | Greg Ginn | Originally appeared on Six Pack (EP) sung by Dez Cadena. |
| 19. | "What I See" | Damaged | Chuck Dukowski | |
| 20. | "TV Party" | Damaged | Greg Ginn | Was re-recorded twice, both for the TV Party EP and for the Repo Man soundtrack. |
| 21. | "Thirsty and Miserable" | Damaged | Chuck Dukowski, Rosa Medea, Robo | |
| 22. | "Police Story" | Damaged | Greg Ginn | One of only three songs to be recorded with all four singers. All alternate versions appear on Everything Went Black. |
| 23. | "Gimmie Gimmie Gimmie" | Damaged | Greg Ginn | One of only three songs to be recorded with all four singers. All alternate versions appear on Everything Went Black. |
| 24. | "Depression" | Damaged | Greg Ginn | One of only three songs to be recorded with all four singers. All alternate versions appear on Everything Went Black. |
| 25. | "Room 13' | Damaged | Greg Ginn, Rosa Medea | A previous recording sung by Dez Cadena can be found on Everything Went Black. |
| 26. | "Damaged II" | Damaged | Greg Ginn | A previous recording sung by Dez Cadena can be found on Everything Went Black. |
| 27. | "No More" | Damaged | Chuck Dukowski | A previous recording sung by Dez Cadena can be found on Everything Went Black. |
| 28. | "Padded Cell" | Damaged | Greg Ginn, Chuck Dukowski | A previous recording sung by Dez Cadena can be found on Everything Went Black. |
| 29. | "Life of Pain" | Damaged | Greg Ginn | |
| 30. | "Damaged I" | Damaged | Greg Ginn, Henry Rollins | Was previously recorded twice by Dez Cadena. One version can be found on the 'Louie Louie' single and The First Four Years, and the other can be found on Everything Went Black. |
| 31. | "I've Got to Run" | TV Party (EP) | Greg Ginn | |
| 32. | "My Rules" | TV Party (EP) | Greg Ginn | Was originally recorded with Ron Reyes and can be found on Everything Went Black. |
| 33. | "What Can You Believe?" | 1982 Demos | Dez Cadena | Was re-recorded and used for DC3's debut album. |
| 34. | "Yes, I Know" | 1982 Demos | Dez Cadena | Was re-recorded and used for DC3's debut album. |
| 35. | "My War" | My War | Chuck Dukowski | Alternate demo versions can be found on 1982 Demos. |
| 36. | "Can't Decide" | My War | Greg Ginn | Alternate demo version can be found on 1982 Demos. |
| 37. | "Beat My Head Against the Wall" | My War | Greg Ginn | Alternate demo version can be found on 1982 Demos. |
| 38. | "I Love You" | My War | Chuck Dukowski | Alternate demo versions can be found on 1982 Demos. |
| 39. | "Forever Time" | My War | Greg Ginn, Henry Rollins | |
| 40. | "The Swinging Man" | My War | Greg Ginn, Henry Rollins | Alternate demo version can be found on 1982 Demos. |
| 41. | "Nothing Left Inside" | My War | Greg Ginn, Henry Rollins | Alternate demo version can be found on 1982 Demos as a medley with Scream. |
| 42. | "Three Nights" | My War | Greg Ginn, Henry Rollins | Alternate demo version can be found on 1982 Demos. |
| 43. | "Scream" | My War | Greg Ginn | Alternate demo version can be found on 1982 Demos as a medley with Nothing Left Inside. |
| 44. | "Armageddon Man" | Family Man | Greg Ginn, Henry Rollins | Mostly improvised. |
| 45. | "Long Lost Dog of It" | Family Man | Greg Ginn, Kira Roessler, Bill Stevenson | Instrumental. |
| 46. | "I Won't Stick Any of You Unless and Until I Can Stick All of You" | Family Man | Greg Ginn | Instrumental. |
| 47. | "Account for What?" | Family Man | Greg Ginn | Instrumental. |
| 48. | "The Pups Are Doggin' It" | Family Man | Greg Ginn, Kira Roessler, Bill Stevenson | Instrumental. |
| 49. | "Slip It In" | Slip It In | Greg Ginn | Alternate demo version can be found on 1982 Demos. |
| 50. | "Black Coffee" | Slip It In | Greg Ginn | Alternate demo version can be found on 1982 Demos. |
| 51. | "Wound Up" | Slip It In | Greg Ginn, Henry Rollins | Alternate demo version can be found on 1982 Demos. |
| 52. | "Rat's Eyes" | Slip It In | Greg Ginn, Henry Rollins | |
| 53. | "Obliteration" | Slip It In | Greg Ginn | Instrumental. |
| 54. | "The Bars" | Slip It In | Chuck Dukowski, Henry Rollins | |
| 55. | "My Ghetto" | Slip It In | Greg Ginn, Henry Rollins | |
| 56. | "You're Not Evil" | Slip It In | Greg Ginn | |
| 57. | "Loose Nut" | Loose Nut | Greg Ginn | |
| 58. | "Bastard in Love" | Loose Nut | Greg Ginn | |
| 59. | "Annihilate this Week" | Loose Nut | Greg Ginn | |
| 60. | "Best One Yet" | Loose Nut | Henry Rollins, Kira Roessler | |
| 61. | "Modern Man" | Loose Nut | Chuck Dukowski, Ed Danky | Alternate demo version can be found on 1982 Demos. |
| 62. | "This is Good" | Loose Nut | Greg Ginn, Henry Rollins | |
| 63. | "I'm the One" | Loose Nut | Henry Rollins, Kira Roessler | |
| 64. | "Sinking" | Loose Nut | Greg Ginn, Henry Rollins | |
| 65. | "Now She's Black" | Loose Nut | Bill Stevenson | |
| 66. | "Your Last Affront" | The Process of Weeding Out | Greg Ginn | Instrumental. |
| 67. | "Screw the Law" | The Process of Weeding Out | Greg Ginn | Instrumental. |
| 68. | "The Process of Weeding Out" | The Process of Weeding Out | Greg Ginn | Instrumental. |
| 69. | "Southern Rise" | The Process of Weeding Out | Greg Ginn, Kira Roessler, Bill Stevenson | Instrumental. |
| 70. | "Paralyzed" | In My Head | Greg Ginn, Henry Rollins | |
| 71. | "The Crazy Girl" | In My Head | Greg Ginn | |
| 72. | "Black Love" | In My Head | Greg Ginn | |
| 73. | "White Hot" | In My Head | Greg Ginn, Henry Rollins | |
| 74. | "In My Head" | In My Head | Greg Ginn, Henry Rollins | |
| 75. | "Out of this World" | In My Head | Bill Stevenson, Kira Roessler | Was also released on the 1989 EP I Can See You. Was not on the original nine song LP version. |
| 76. | "I Can See You" | In My Head | Greg Ginn | Was also released on the 1989 EP I Can See You. Was not on the original nine song LP version. |
| 77. | "Drinking and Driving" | In My Head | Greg Ginn | |
| 78. | "Retired at 21" | In My Head | Greg Ginn, Henry Rollins | |
| 79. | "Society's Tease" | In My Head | Greg Ginn | |
| 80. | "It's All Up to You" | In My Head | Greg Ginn | |
| 81. | "You Let Me Down" | In My Head | Bill Stevenson, Henry Rollins | Was also released on the 1989 EP I Can See You. Was not on the original nine song LP version. |
| 82. | "Kicking 'N Sticking" | I Can See You | Greg Ginn, Henry Rollins | Originally appeared on the 1986 Lovedolls Superstar soundtrack. |
| 83. | "My Heart's Pumping" | What The... | Greg Ginn, Ron Reyes | |
| 84. | "Down in the Dirt" | What The... | Greg Ginn, Ron Reyes | |
| 85. | "Blood and Ashes" | What The... | Greg Ginn, Ron Reyes | |
| 86. | "Now Is the Time" | What The... | Greg Ginn, Ron Reyes | |
| 87. | "Wallow in Despair" | What The... | Greg Ginn, Ron Reyes | |
| 88. | "Slow Your Ass Down" | What The... | Greg Ginn, Ron Reyes | |
| 89. | "It's So Absurd" | What The... | Greg Ginn, Ron Reyes | |
| 90. | "Shut Up" | What The... | Greg Ginn, Ron Reyes | |
| 91. | "This Is Hell" | What The... | Greg Ginn, Ron Reyes | |
| 92. | "Go Away" | What The... | Greg Ginn, Ron Reyes | |
| 93. | "The Bitter End" | What The... | Greg Ginn, Ron Reyes | |
| 94. | "The Chase" | What The... | Greg Ginn, Ron Reyes | |
| 95. | "I'm Sick" | What The... | Greg Ginn, Ron Reyes | |
| 96. | "It's Not My Time to Go-Go" | What The... | Greg Ginn, Ron Reyes | |
| 97. | "Lies" | What The... | Greg Ginn, Ron Reyes | |
| 98. | "Get Out of My Way" | What The... | Greg Ginn, Ron Reyes | |
| 99. | "Outside" | What The... | Greg Ginn, Ron Reyes | |
| 100. | "No Teeth" | What The... | Greg Ginn, Ron Reyes | |
| 101. | "To Hell and Back" | What The... | Greg Ginn, Ron Reyes | |
| 102. | "Give Me All Your Dough" | What The... | Greg Ginn, Ron Reyes | |
| 103. | "You Gotta Be Joking" | What The... | Greg Ginn, Ron Reyes | |
| 104. | "Off My Shoulders" | What The... | Greg Ginn | Mathew Cortez plays drums on this track instead of Gregory Moore |

== See also ==
- Black Flag discography
- List of Black Flag band members
