= Black Flag discography =

- Studio albums: 7
- Extended plays: 8
- Live albums: 3
- Compilation albums: 4
- Singles: 2
- Video albums: 3
- Music videos: 6
- Other appearances: 3

The discography of Black Flag, an American hardcore punk band, consists of seven studio albums, three live albums, four compilation albums, eight EPs, and one single.

== Studio albums ==
Year	Album details
1981	Damaged: Released: November 1981; Label: SST; Format: LP, CS, CD
1984	My War: Released: March 1984; Label: SST; Format: LP, CS, CD
1984	Family Man: Released: September 1984; Label: SST; Format: LP, CS, CD
1984	Slip It In: Released: December 1984; Label: SST; Format: LP, CS, CD
1985	Loose Nut: Released: May 1985; Label: SST; Format: LP, CS, CD
1985	In My Head: Released: October 1985; Label: SST; Format: LP, CS, CD
2013	What The...: Released: November 5, 2013; Label: SST; Format: LP, CD

== Live albums ==
Year	Album details
1984	Live '84: Released: December 1984; Label: SST; Format: CS, CD
1986	Who's Got the 10½?: Released: March 1986; Label: SST; Format: LP, CS, CD
2010	Live at the On Broadway 1982: Released: November 2010; Label: CD Presents; Format: Digital download

== Compilation albums ==
Year	Album details
1982	Everything Went Black: Released: 1982; Label: SST; Format: LP, CD
1982	1982 Demos: Released: 1982; Label: None; Format: LP, CD
1983	The First Four Years: Released: 1983; Label: SST; Format: CS, LP, CD
1987	Wasted…Again: Released: 1987; Label: SST; Format: LP, CS, CD

== EPs ==
Year	Album details
1979	Nervous Breakdown: Released: January 1979; Label: SST; Format: EP, CD
1980	Jealous Again: Released: August 1980; Label: SST; Format: EP, CD
1981	Six Pack: Released: June 1981; Label: SST; Format: EP, CD
1982	TV Party: Released: July 1982; Label: SST; Format: EP, CD
1985	The Process of Weeding Out: Released: September 1985; Label: SST; Format: EP, CD
1986	Minuteflag: Released: 1986; Label: SST; Format: EP
1989	I Can See You: Released: 1989; Label: SST; Format: EP, CD

== Singles ==
Year	Details
1981	"Louie Louie"/ "Damaged I": Released: 1981; Label: Posh Boy; Format: 7", CD
1986	"Annihilate This Week": Released: 1986; Label: SST Records; Format: 12", cassette, CD

=== Digital Singles ===
3 digital singles were released from May to July to support the then-upcoming album What The..., releasing on 5 November 2013.

Year	Details
2013	"Down in the Dirt": Released: 7 May 2013; Label: SST Records
2013	"The Chase": Released: 13 May 2013; Label: SST Records
2013	"Wallow in Despair": Released: 11 July 2013; Label: SST Records

== Video albums ==
Year	Video details
1983	Black Flag: "TV Party": Label: Target Video; Format: VHS
1984	Black Flag Live: My War: Recorded: May 19, 1984 - Bierkellar, Leeds; Label: Jettisoundz; Format: VHS
1984	Live '84: Recorded: August 26, 1984 - The Stone, San Francisco; Label: SST/Ace Video; Format: VHS

== Films ==
Year	Video Details
1991	Reality 86'd: Filmed: 1986; Released: September 1, 1991 (USA); Director: Dave Markey; Label: We Got Power Films; Format: VHS, digital

== Music videos ==
Year	Song	Director
1982	"TV Party"	Target Video
1983	"Rise Above" [Live]	Target Video
1983	"Thirsty and Miserable" [Live]	Target Video
1984	"American Waste"	Target Video
1984	"Slip It In"	Dave Markey
1985	"Drinking and Driving"	Dave Markey

== Other appearances ==
The following Black Flag tracks were released on compilation albums and soundtracks. This is not an exhaustive list; tracks that were first released on the band's albums, EPs, or singles are not included.

Year	Details	Track(s)
1980	Cracks in the Sidewalk: Released: 1980; Label: New Alliance (NAR-001); Format: EP	"Clocked In"^{[I]}
1981	The Decline of Western Civilization soundtrack: Released: 1981; Label: Slash, Rhino; Format: LP, CD	"White Minority" (live); "Depression" (live); "Revenge" (live)
1981	Chunks: Released: 1981; Label: New Alliance (NAR-003); Format: LP	"Machine"^{[I]}
1981	Let Them Eat Jellybeans!: Released: 1981; Label: Alternative Tentacles (VIRUS 4); Format: LP	"Police Story"
1982	Rat Music for Rat People: Released: 1982; Label: Go! (GO-003); Format: LP, Cassette	"Scream"(live)
1984	Repo Man soundtrack: Released: 1984; Label: MCA; Format: LP	"TV Party"
1986	Lovedolls Superstar soundtrack: Released: 1986; Label: SST Records; Format: LP, CS, CD	"Kicking 'N Sticking"

I Denotes tracks that were re-released on The First Four Years.

== See also ==
- List of songs recorded by Black Flag
