= List of Black Flag band members =

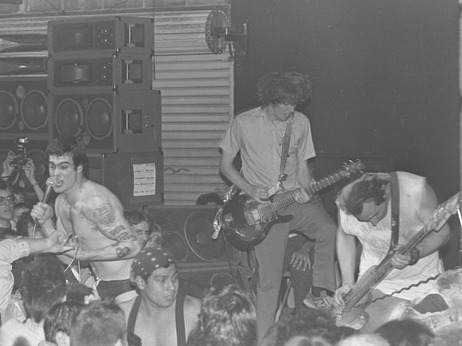
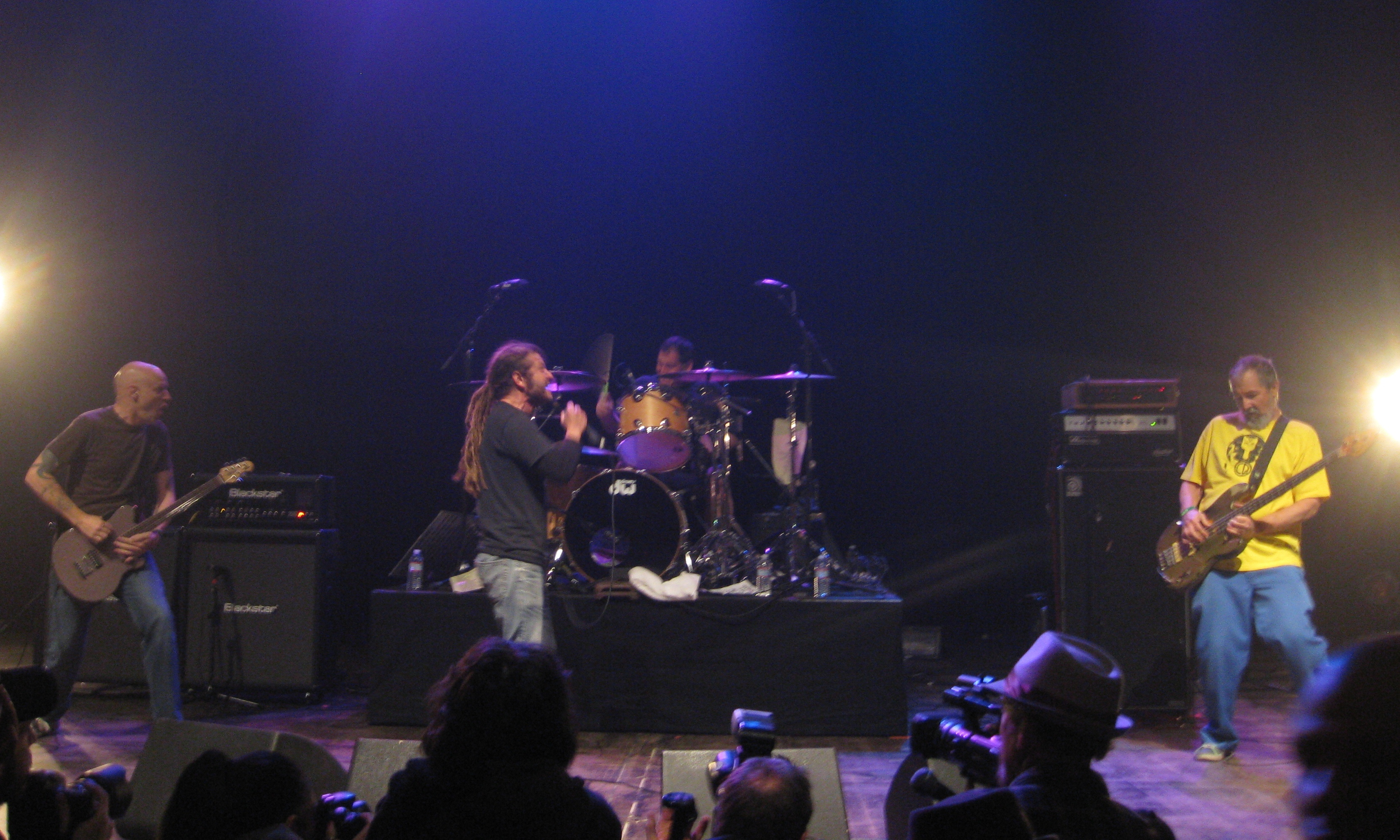
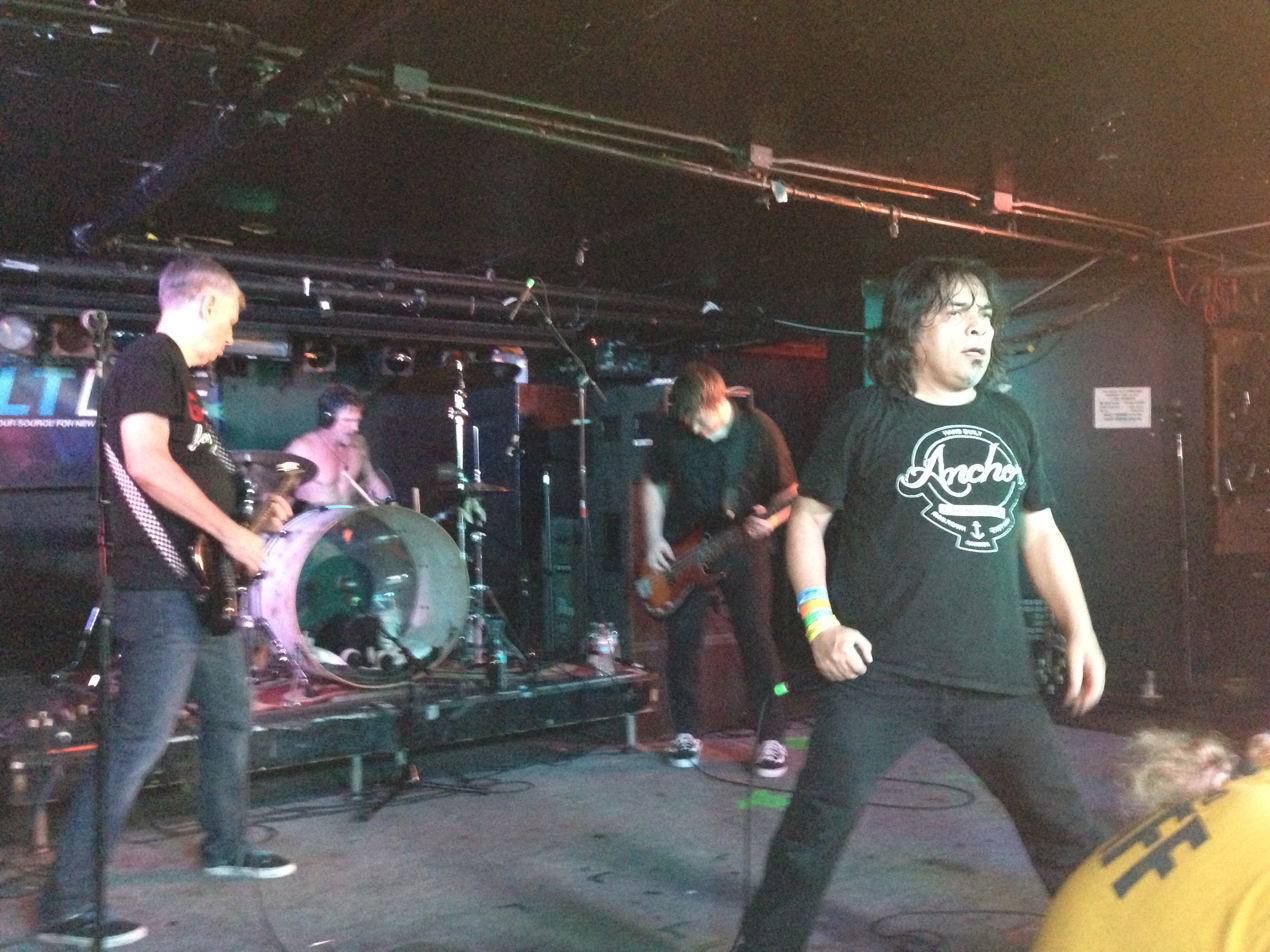
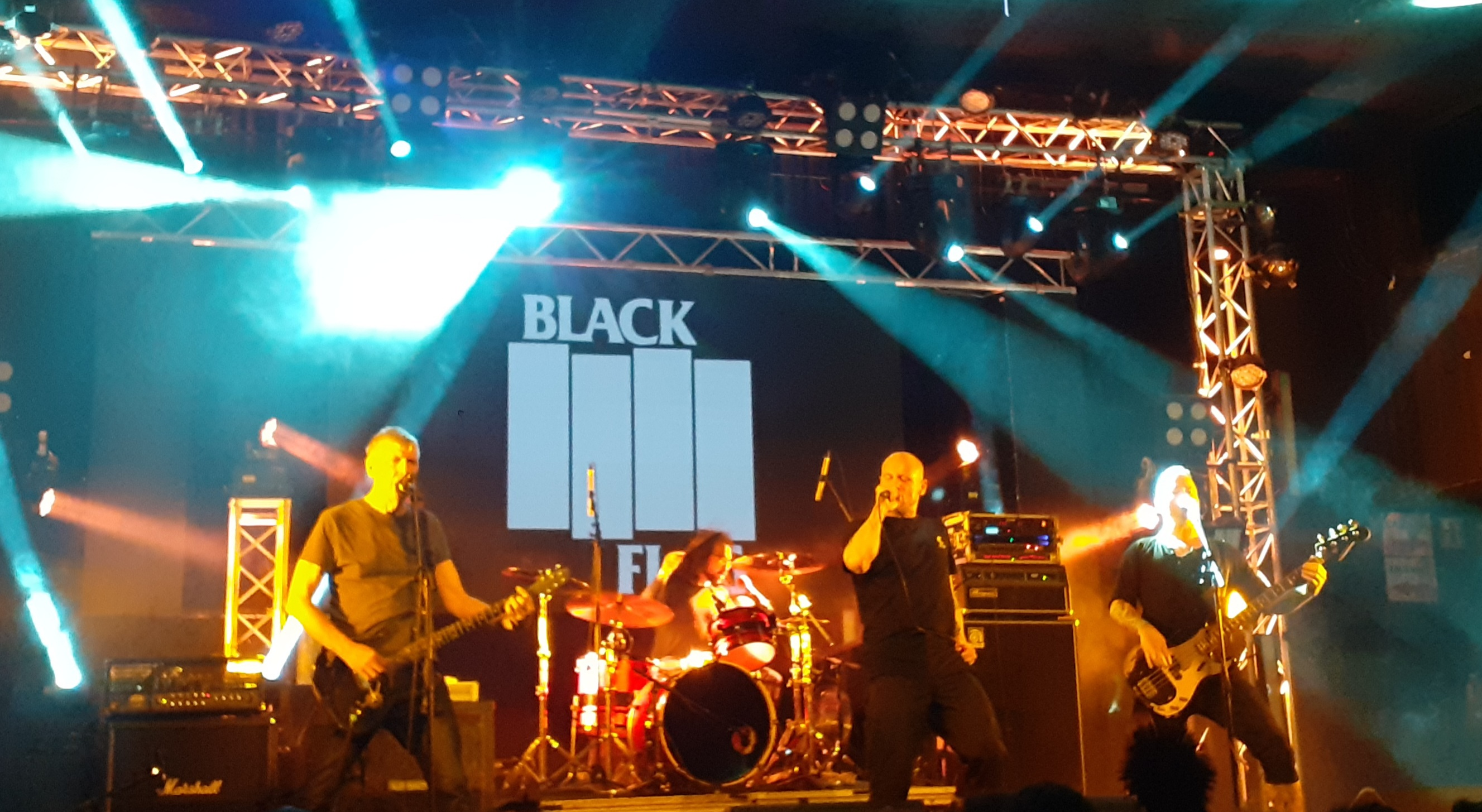
Four line-ups of Black Flag in 1983, 2011, 2013 and 2023.

Black Flag is an American hardcore punk band formed in 1976 in Hermosa Beach, California by Greg Ginn, the band's guitarist, primary songwriter, and sole constant member, and vocalist Keith Morris. During Black Flag's initial 10-year existence, the band went through 16 distinct lineups involving 17 different musicians. Aside from Ginn, the longest-lasting members were bassist Chuck Dukowski (six years), vocalist Henry Rollins (five years), vocalist Morris (three-and-a-half years), and drummer Roberto "Robo" Valverde (three-and-a-half years). The 1983–1985 lineup of Ginn, Rollins, bassist Kira Roessler, and drummer Bill Stevenson recorded four albums and three EPs together in a sixteen-month period. After breaking up in 1986 and briefly reuniting in 2003, Black Flag announced another reunion in January 2013, followed by a third in 2019. In 2013, Morris along with other former member of Black Flag who were estranged from Ginn, formed FLAG and started touring and performing Black Flag songs. Following Black Flag's 2019 reunion tour, Ginn recruited new musicians in 2025 for concerts.

== History ==
Ginn formed the band with singer Keith Morris in the summer of 1976. Ginn's younger brother Raymond—known later by his pseudonym Raymond Pettibon—played bass guitar with them in early rehearsals but soon bowed out of the group to focus on his college education. To fill out the rhythm section Morris recruited some of his friends, whom he described as "scruffy beach rat types who were more interested in getting laid and finding drugs than really playing". By early 1977 these included a bassist known only as "Kansas" and drummer Bryan Migdol, though both would frequently skip rehearsals. The band originally called themselves Panic. Ginn's friend Glenn Lockett, also known as Spot, played bass guitar with the group during rehearsals in early 1977. Würm bassist Gary McDaniel, who later adopted the pseudonym Chuck Dukowski, began sitting in with the band and soon became their permanent bassist. Spot became a recording engineer and record producer, recording the band's releases over the next eight years and working with many of the other bands on Ginn and Dukowski's independent record label SST. Panic changed their name to Black Flag in 1978, and released their debut EP Nervous Breakdown in January 1979.

Migdol left and was replaced by Robo, a Colombian national. Morris recorded basic tracks for Black Flag's second release, but left the band to form the Circle Jerks shortly before Black Flag was to embark on a summer 1979 West Coast tour. He was replaced by Ron Reyes, who also recorded tracks for the band's second release but quit mid-performance in May 1980. The band convinced him to return to finish recording the Jealous Again EP (1980), then replaced him with Dez Cadena in June 1980. Cadena sang on the "Louie Louie" single (1981) and both sang and played guitar on the Six Pack EP (1981), but his voice suffered from the strain of constant touring and he expressed a desire to move to guitar. When the band toured the East Coast of the United States in December 1980, they met Washington, D.C. native and State of Alert singer Henry Garfield, who stayed in touch with Dukowski. When they returned to the East Coast that spring, Garfield jumped on stage at a New York City show and sang a song with them. A few days later they asked him to audition in New York City and offered him the position of lead singer. After settling his affairs at home, Garfield met up with Black Flag in Detroit and sang at soundchecks and encores throughout the rest of the tour while Cadena continued to sing the main sets. On arriving in Los Angeles with the band, Garfield took the pseudonym Henry Rollins.

The five-piece Black Flag lineup of Ginn, Dukowski, Robo, Cadena and Rollins recorded the band's first full-length album, Damaged, in 1981. However, Robo encountered visa problems at the end of a December 1981 tour of the United Kingdom and could not legally return to the United States. Descendents drummer Bill Stevenson was brought in to finish the tour with a week of East Coast dates. For the first half of 1982, sixteen-year-old Emil Johnson drummed for Black Flag, playing on the title track of the TV Party EP, but quit in the middle of a U.S. tour after a fight with the band's roadie Mugger. He was replaced by Chuck Biscuits of D.O.A., but Biscuits lasted only several months as he would not agree to the band's demanding rehearsal schedule. With the Descendents on hiatus, Bill Stevenson joined Black Flag in early 1983 as their new drummer, and the band toured the United States and Europe. Cadena left Black Flag in April 1983 to form his own band, DC3, and was not replaced. Ginn also attempted to edge out Dukowski, desiring a new musical direction, and in the fall of 1983 Rollins took it upon himself to fire Dukowski from Black Flag in order to resolve the situation. Dukowski remained involved with Black Flag, acting as their manager and booking agent.

Throughout 1982 and 1983, the band had been in a legal dispute with Unicorn Records over the rights to Damaged that had prevented them from releasing material under the Black Flag name, though they had released the 1982 compilation album Everything Went Black, consisting of demos recorded during Morris, Reyes, and Cadena's stints as singer (Morris was credited as "Johnny 'Bob' Goldstein" and Reyes as "Chavo Pederast"). When Unicorn went bankrupt in late 1983, the band was free to release new material and recorded their second album, 1984's My War, with Ginn playing bass guitar under the pseudonym Dale Nixon. Shortly after the album's recording, Kira Roessler was added as the band's new bassist. The lineup of Ginn, Rollins, Stevenson, and Roessler was Black Flag's most prolific, releasing three more albums in 1984 (Family Man, Slip It In, and Live '84) along with two more albums (Loose Nut and In My Head) and an EP (The Process of Weeding Out) in 1985.

Stevenson was fired from Black Flag by Ginn in late April 1985 and returned to the Descendents. He was replaced by Anthony Martinez, who toured North America with the band and played on the live album Who's Got the 10½? (1986). Roessler was fired in September 1985 and replaced by C'el Revuelta, who performed on the band's final tour from January to June 1986. Ginn disbanded Black Flag that August.

In September 2003, Ginn organized three Black Flag reunion shows to benefit cat rescue organizations. The lineup for these performances was Ginn on lead guitar, C'el Revuelta on bass, Dez Cadena on rhythm guitar and co-lead vocals, and Robo on drums. Pro-skateboarder Mike Vallely sang for Black Flag and drummer Gregory Moore was on the drums for one of the sets of this show when the band played the entire My War album with a pre-recorded bass track by Ginn.

In January 2013, Ginn announced that he was reuniting Black Flag with Ron Reyes on vocals and Gregory Moore on drums and that the band would make a European and North American tour as well as release a new album. Black Flag has been confirmed to headline the Hevy Festival in the U.K., the Ruhrpott Rodeo Festival in Germany and the Muddy Roots Music Festival in Cookeville, Tennessee in 2013. In November of the same year, Reyes was fired on stage and replaced by Mike Vallely from Ginn's other band Good for You.

Also in January 2013, other former Black Flag members who are estranged from Greg Ginn, former singer Keith Morris, former bassist Chuck Dukowski and former drummer Bill Stevenson announced that they would also play some shows as "Flag", playing Black Flag songs, with Stephen Egerton of All and The Descendents instead of Greg Ginn on guitar during Spring and Summer of 2013.

In 2019 Black Flag resumed touring with Ginn, Vallely, Smith, and new drummer Isaias Gil. In April 2025, Ginn announced a new line-up of Black Flag featuring Max Zanelly on vocals, David Rodriguez on bass and Bryce Weston on drums.

== Membership information ==
=== Singers ===
==== Keith Morris ====
Keith Morris grew up in Hermosa Beach and attended Mira Costa High School, where brothers Greg and Raymond Ginn were also students. After graduating in 1973 he studied fine art and painting while working at his father's bait shop. One of his co-workers at the shop was Bill Stevenson, a Mira Costa student eight years Morris' junior who would also go on to be a member of Black Flag (Morris' father befriended Ozzie Cadena, who son Dez would also later join Black Flag). Becoming a fan of heavy rock and proto-punk groups, Morris took a second job working at local record store Rubicon Records. It was here that he struck up a friendship with Greg Ginn, whose sister was dating Morris' record store co-worker. Morris soon left the family bait shop and began working for Ginn's amateur radio and electronics business, Solid State Tuners (SST). The two bonded over shared musical tastes, including an interest in early punk rock groups, and decided to start a band together. Morris originally planned to play drums in the group, but Ginn convinced him to take the role of vocalist after witnessing his frantic energy while singing along to the radio. In the summer of 1976 they began rehearsing songs that Ginn had written on guitar, with Ginn's brother Raymond accompanying on bass guitar. By early 1977 Morris had recruited friends of his to serve as the rhythm section, including bassist "Kansas" and drummer Brian Migdol, and the group took the name Panic. Morris performed at Panic's early shows and on their debut EP, Nervous Breakdown, recorded in January 1978. Later that year he and then-Panic bassist Gary McDaniel (later known as Chuck Dukowski) took up residence at "The Church", an abandoned Baptist church the band was then using as a rehearsal space. The band changed its name to Black Flag in early 1979.

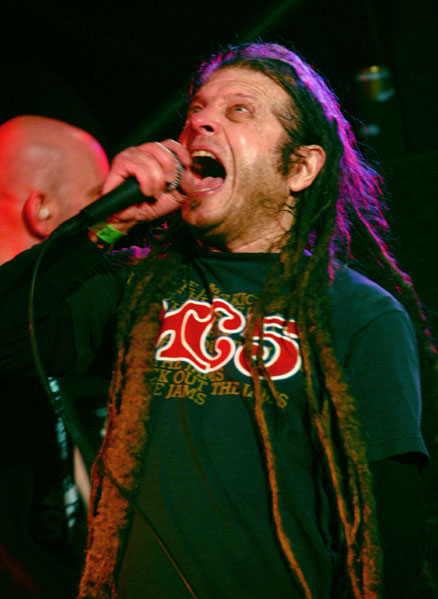
Morris with the Circle Jerks in 2006

By November 1979, however, Morris was growing "burned out" with Black Flag's long and frequent rehearsals, and began making excuses to miss them. His feelings of isolation within the band exacerbated his problems with drugs and alcohol: "I was doing a lot of drugs, and I was drinking quite a bit", he later recalled, "That's like the major reason for me leaving Black Flag, because it wasn't fun, and part of my fun was to drink away the bad stuff, or party away all the things in my life that I didn't want to be a part of." Tensions came to a head during the band's two-day recording session that month for a prospective full-length album, and Morris announced at the end of the session that he was leaving the group. McDaniel later said that Morris quit because "he wanted to stay exactly the same. Our music was changing, and he didn't like a lot of our new songs." Morris claimed to have felt blamed by the other members for slowing the band's progress: "Whenever there would be arguments, everyone would be pointing their finger at me, and it would be my fault. Like, if we weren't learning new songs fast enough, it was my fault. Coming to rehearsal after having drunk a six-pack of beer, maybe having snorted a couple lines of coke, that would be my fault. They made me feel like I was the cement shoes attached to their feet." Black Flag's constant rehearsals also eroded Morris' friendships with Ginn and then-Black Flag drummer Robo: "I guess our line of communication just ceased to exist, and that's really important", he later said, "There has to be some free space, some head time, we can't be around each other in these grungy, dirty, filthy-carpet-covered rooms all the time. We needed to get out and breathe some fresh air, rub elbows with our friends in other bands, and play more shows, instead of just rehearsing, rehearsing and rehearsing all the time." According to Morris, his departure was not acrimonious:

It was entirely my decision. For me, we had pretty much run our course. I love Robo, I still respect Greg, Gary kind of irritated me at times. But the fact of the matter is, when I left I felt no hatred towards them; it wasn't like "Fuck you guys, man, I don't ever wanna see you again!" It wasn't like that. Because I still lived in the church and they were still rehearsing there. They probably breathed a sigh of relief, because I was completely in the throes of being a full-blown alcoholic cokehead, and it didn't help that Robo was one of my suppliers. A couple of weeks later, I started my next group.

This next group was the Circle Jerks, which included guitarist Greg Hetson, who had recently quit Red Cross, as well as drummer Lucky Lehrer and bassist Roger Rogerson. Their early set list included some of Morris' Black Flag lyrics set to new music: Nervous Breakdown's "Wasted", the recorded-but-unreleased "I Don't Care", and two songs Morris had written with Black Flag but had not recorded: "Red Tape" and "Behind the Door" (originally titled "Room 13"). They also used some songs that Hetson had written with Red Cross, and gave them new lyrics. This caused conflict with Morris' former bandmates in Black Flag: "They were extremely angry and spiteful about it," he said. "These were songs that I did with Black Flag, but I wrote the lyrics, so I can do with them whatever I want. We souped them up, we changed the notes, the tempos... The only people who were upset about this were the guys in Black Flag and Red Cross." The Circle Jerks' versions of these songs appeared on their debut album Group Sex (1980). Black Flag responded by rewriting "I Don't Care" as "You Bet We've Got Something Personal Against You!" for 1980's Jealous Again EP, taking the music from their original version but changing Morris' lyrics into a screed against him, accusing him of stealing their song and lying about it, and declaring "you've got nowhere to go but down".

Morris was asked by director Penelope Spheeris to sing with Black Flag for her documentary film The Decline of Western Civilization. Morris declined, and ultimately both the Circle Jerks and Black Flag appeared in the film, the latter with Morris' replacement Ron Reyes singing. After Reyes quit Black Flag in May 1980, Morris filled in for two shows in Los Angeles and San Francisco. "Black Flag was my first love;" he later recalled, "I've got the Black Flag bars tattooed on my heart, branded in my brain. Greg [Ginn] and Chuck [Dukowski] asked me to fill in, and I knew that I was just filling in, that I wasn't rejoining Black Flag on any permanent basis, because the Circle Jerks had made a record, it was very popular, and people really loved us, and we were selling out shows. So everything was cool, and I had no problem filling in for Ron Reyes for a couple of nights."

==== Ron Reyes ====
Ron Reyes, a punk rock fan of Puerto Rican descent, dropped out of Mira Costa High school at age 18. He was present for Black Flag's first performance, at the Redondo Beach Moose Lodge, and the experience left a strong impression on him:

I was just blown away. Keith [Morris] was like an animal; it was so fun, to see this guy just screaming and shouting. Everything about them was so over-the-top, and so energetic; the bands I'd seen before, like X and the Germs, they just paled in comparison to the energy that Black Flag had. Those other bands, they were 'rock bands', and Black Flag were...something else. The intensity of Greg Ginn's guitar playing, I have never seen anything like that, to this day. And Gary McDaniel, y'know, he was just wild, crazy, and so intense. It was just the intensity of it all. I'd never seen anything like that before.

Reyes and Dez Cadena were friends and had practiced songs together on guitar. In summer 1979, Reyes moved into "The Church", where Black Flag rehearsed; He would watch the band practice and became good friends with them, particularly Morris. He purchased a drum kit from a friend as a favor, and soon began drumming for a group called The Tourists, with Greg Hetson and brothers Jeff and Steven McDonald. The Tourists opened for Black Flag at their infamous July 22, 1979 performance at Manhattan Beach's Polliwog Park, and the following month changed their name to Red Cross. Reyes continued to follow Black Flag, travelling to San Francisco that fall for their first performances outside the Los Angeles area. By the time Morris left Black Flag in November 1979, Reyes had quit Red Cross and was playing drums with a group called The Tracks. Greg Ginn and Gary McDaniel approached him with an offer to sing for Black Flag. "I was a little bit nervous, I guess," recalled Reyes, "but it seemed really natural; I had no experience as a singer, I'd never wanted to be a singer, but I wasn't intimidated. Because it was very clear to me from the get-go that the whole spirit of punk rock was not about experience, and talent, and chops — It was all about attitude and energy. I figured I had enough of that to get by." Reyes speculated that Black Flag chose him because he was not part of the Hollywood punk rock scene:

They had quite a lot of distaste for the Hollywood scene. So I think they went out of their way to avoid that, and finding a home-grown South kinda guy was attractive to them. Certainly, I was a huge fan, I loved the band, I was at all their shows, right up the front, raising a bunch of hell with them. Black Flag was really kind of a family down there in the South Bay, it was close-knit, and I don't think they would have been interested in going the normal route of doing auditions with people they didn't know. Probably it was just being in the right place, at the right time.

Reyes' first show with Black Flag was December 16, 1979, less than three weeks after Morris' departure. His performance style was spirited and anarchic, characterized by the frantic energy with which he would dash across the stage and hurl himself into the audience while barking the lyrics in a howling, out-of-breath fashion. Ginn also began teaching Reyes how to play guitar, with an eye towards making him a rhythm guitarist as well as vocalist, which would free Ginn up to play lead guitar and add solos to his songs. Ultimately, however, Reyes would never play guitar in Black Flag. He appeared with the band in the documentary film The Decline of Western Civilization and performed with them on their first shows outside of California, traveling to Vancouver, Seattle, and Portland in February and April 1980. Having attempted to record their debut album with Morris the previous November, Black Flag made another attempt at it with Reyes in April 1980. The session was unsuccessful, in part because Reyes would sometimes leave the studio mid-take. "I was a little intimidated by the studio process", he later admitted. "Put me on stage for 20 minutes, where I could just go wild, and I loved that. But now I had to sing the song in key, in tune...And Greg was committed to a level of excellence. He would not have let us do anything that wasn't great. Some of our earlier recordings were frustrating for a lot of us."

Reyes quit Black Flag mid-performance during a May 23, 1980 show at The Fleetwood in Redondo Beach, California. "There was a lot of violence, and I was really starting to lose my taste for it", he later recalled. "It seemed like it didn't matter what we did up there, we could've just been up onstage masturbating and it wouldn't have made a difference; [the audience] would have kept on slamming and going around in circles and doing their thing, and that's all they cared about. I felt, 'What's the point?' ... So I just walked offstage. I remember saying something to the effect of, 'I don't really care about being the background to whatever it is that you're doing out there...' It didn't have anything to do with the other band members, I had no beef with any of them." Black Flag finished the set by playing an extended version of "Louie Louie", with various audience members taking the microphone.

Despite having quit the band, Reyes agreed to return to finish recording the tracks they had begun in April. Recording engineer and producer Spot recalled that "recording the vocals in a posthumous manner [Reyes] was surprisingly cooperative and I was moved to remark: 'This is so easy now! Why didn't you quit the band before this?'" Reyes later remarked that "Spot just wanted to finish the project. I don't think they had a desire that I would join the band again. I felt, 'OK, that's cool'. I still loved the band, I loved the music, I had no bad feelings towards the guys, so I was totally into it." According to Ginn, "Ron was kind of apprehensive about recording. He liked to sing live, but he just hated the recording process, so it was like pulling teeth, but we finally got it done. And that's the thing about Ron, his energy was incredible onstage, he would just burst out, you know? And we finally got that performance on tape, but it took a little bit of doing, just because he wasn't ever really comfortable in the studio."

Reyes had begun dating a girl from Vancouver, and soon moved there. When the Jealous Again EP was released in August 1980, he was credited on the sleeve as "Chavo Pederast", a mean-spirited joke on the part of Black Flag: "Chavo" after the homeless orphan character in the Mexican sitcom El Chavo, and "Pederast" after pederasty. "At the time, I'm not even sure I understood the derogatory nature of the name, and I don't think I would have cared anyway", said Reyes. "It seemed a very natural, punk-rock thing to do, and I would have done the same thing if I was in their shoes ... When I became a family man, and the meaning of that name became more apparent to me, then it was something I felt a little shame over. I found I had to explain myself, a lot, when people called me Chavo Pederast."

==== Dez Cadena ====
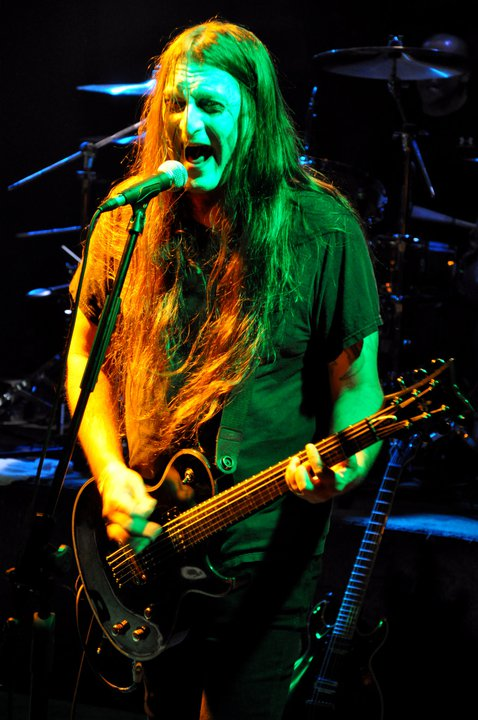
Cadena with the Misfits in 2011

Dez Cadena moved with his family from New Jersey to Hermosa Beach in 1974, at age 13. His father, record producer and jazz promoter Ozzie Cadena, befriended Keith Morris' father Jerry Morris. In February 1979 the 17-year-old Dez was present, along with his friend Ron Reyes, for Black Flag's first performance. He continued to follow the band, hanging out at their rehearsals and attending many of their performances. In June 1980 he was playing guitar in a reformed Red Cross when Black Flag approached him to replace Ron Reyes as their singer. Cadena recalled Chuck Dukowski asking him to join the band: "He said, 'You know all the words to our songs, in a week we have to play a gig in Vancouver, why don't you become our next singer?'" Never having sung before, Cadena was initially reserved, but Dukowski assured him that did not matter. "Black Flag was my favorite band," Cadena later said, "and these guys were my friends, so I didn't want to let them down." In contrast to the sardonic anarchism of Keith Morris and the chaotic energy of Ron Reyes, Cadena's singing was a blunt, flinty bark delivered with passion and fury, evoking vocal cords strained almost to breaking point. His guitar-playing skills were attractive to Ginn, who planned—as he had with Reyes—to eventually position Cadena to also play rhythm guitar, freeing Ginn up to play lead and add solos.

Cadena's first performance with Black Flag was a party at the end of summer 1980 to close out "The Church", the abandoned Baptist church they had used as a living and rehearsal space since 1978. The band had moved out of the building several months prior, and on the eve of a West Coast tour invited many of their fans to demolish the property as means of provoking the police before they left town.

==== Henry Rollins ====
Henry Rollins had been the lead singer of the Washington, D.C.–based hardcore punk band State of Alert. He had befriended several members of the band and had invited them to crash at his house during their East Coast tour at one point. When Cadena moved to rhythm guitar from vocals, the band hired on Rollins to perform lead vocal duties. After Black Flag broke up in 1986, Rollins, who had already begun a spoken word solo career, founded his own band Rollins Band. Since 2006, Rollins has mostly left the music industry, and has focused his career on his spoken word performances, acting in films and on television, and as a television presenter.

==== Mike Vallely ====
Vallely was friends with Ginn during the years when Black Flag was not a performing band and had sung with the band during a 2003 reunion show. When the band reformed in 2013, Ron Reyes was their vocalist for the first several months. Reyes was fired mid-performance during a November 2013 show in Australia, and Vallely was invited on stage to finish the set. He remained with the band until January 2025, making him the longest-tenured vocalist in the band's history. Vallely is also a professional skateboarder and singer with a number of other punk bands.

==== Max Zanelly ====
Max Zanelly joined as the band's vocalist in 2025. She is the only female lead vocalist in the band's history, as well as only the second ever woman to join the band following bassist Kira Roessler in 1983.

==== London Downey ====
London Downey is filling in for Zanelly on the band's 2026 fall tour. Zanelly was unable to tour due to issues with her work visa. Zanelly is set to return to the band once the problems are settled.

=== Guitarists ===
==== Greg Ginn ====
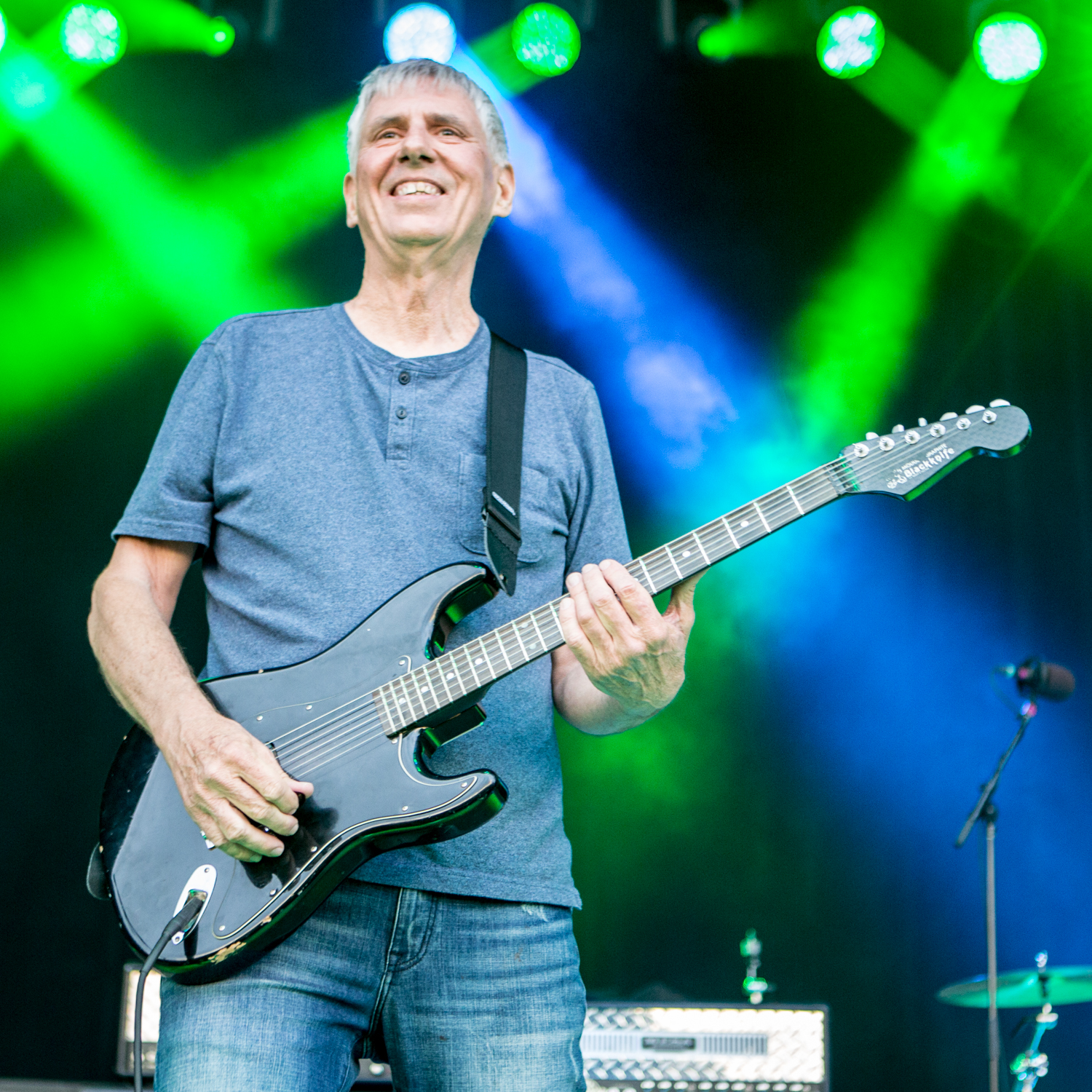
Greg Ginn with Black Flag in 2019

Greg Ginn is Black Flag's lead guitarist, primary songwriter, sole constant member, and the only musician to play on all of the band's releases. He attended Mira Costa High School with Keith Morris, and started a mail-order company for amateur radio equipment called Solid State Tuners (SST). He became interested in blues and jazz while studying economics and business management at UCLA, and began playing guitar at age 19, becoming a fan of the Grateful Dead as well as various protopunk and punk rock groups He befriended Morris when Ginn's younger sister began dating Morris' record store co-worker. Morris started working for SST, and he and Ginn bonded over musical taste and decided to start a band. In the summer of 1976 they began rehearsing songs that Ginn had written, with Morris singing Ginn's lyrics and Ginn's younger brother Raymond accompanying on bass guitar. By early 1977 they had named the band Panic, with Morris' friends "Kansas" and Brian Migdol on bass guitar and drums, respectively.

Because Kansas and Migdol would often fail to show up for rehearsals, Ginn modified his guitar style to a percussive strum that doubled as a lead and rhythm section. During the band's early years he played a transparent lucite Ampeg Dan Armstrong guitar that he heavily customized, caulking it to prevent blood and sweat from seeping into the electronics and hard-wiring the cord into the instrument so that the socket would not be pulled out if someone tripped on the cord. He had rented storage and workspace for SST at an abandoned Baptist church, and this became Panic's new home when they were kicked out of their rehearsal space in late 1978. When Panic became Black Flag in early 1979, Ginn booked their first shows under the new name himself, and released their debut EP Nervous Breakdown through his own label, SST Records (which shared its name with his electronics company).

==== Dez Cadena ====
After the band hired Henry Rollins to be their lead vocalist, Dez Cadena moved to rhythm guitar. After leaving Black Flag in 1983, Cadena went on to front DC3 from 1983 to 1988. He spent the 1990s playing in various bands for relatively short stints before joining the Misfits in 2001. He left the Misfits in 2015 and currently appears with the Keith Morris-fronted Flag.

=== Bassists ===
==== Raymond Pettibon ====
When Greg Ginn and Keith Morris first began rehearsing together in the summer of 1976, Ginn's brother Raymond accompanied them on bass guitar. By early 1977 Raymond had bowed out of the group to focus on earning his degree in economics from UCLA, after which he became a high school mathematics teacher. "I kinda played bass and learned their songs, but I was never in the band", he later recalled, "There's nothing I could do that would deaden the mind more than play bass in a punk band. Especially that band." In early 1979 the band was looking to change their name from Panic, and it was Raymond—who had since quit his teaching job in favor of pursuing a career as a visual artist under the pseudonym Raymond Pettibon—who suggested the name Black Flag and designed their logo.

Over the next six years Pettibon's single-frame illustrations were used for the band's sleeve artwork, posters, and gig flyers, their unsettling and provocative imagery becoming synonymous with Black Flag's music while helping to build the group's notoriety and expand their fan base. His artwork appears on the covers of Nervous Breakdown, Jealous Again, Six Pack, Everything Went Black, My War, Family Man, Slip It In, Loose Nut, The Process of Weeding Out, and In My Head. He also did artwork for other SST releases including the compilation albums The Blasting Concept and Cracks in the Sidewalk, and released pamphlet books of his art through SST. However, he had a falling out with Black Flag and SST in 1985 over the Loose Nut artwork, which had been used for a flyer several years earlier. Greg Ginn resurrected it without telling his brother and turned it over to drummer Bill Stevenson to do the layout, who cut it into pieces and used them as elements for the cover and lyric sheet. Pettibon became irate and ended his relationship with the band and the label, and he and Ginn stopped speaking for some time: "As far as I'm concerned, SST is not even a part of my past. For one thing, it was dishonestly procured. I was never paid for any of that stuff. If you talk to [SST] it's like Stalinist Russia, rewriting history. Somebody is some big commissar and the next day he's purged and all traces of his existence are literally written out of the official history." Pettibon later worked with Keith Morris again, providing cover artwork for his band Off! in 2010.

==== Jim "Kansas" Dearman ====
After Pettibon's exit from the group, a friend of Morris' known as "Kansas", real name Jim Dearmen, became their new bassist. Described by Morris as "just this huge stoner", Kansas and drummer Bryan Migdol were not committed to the band and would often fail to show up for rehearsals. This caused Ginn to modify his guitar style to a percussive strum that doubled as a lead and rhythm section. Kansas left the band before the summer of 1977, and was replaced at rehearsals by Glenn "Spot" Lockett.

==== Spot ====
Glenn "Spot" Lockett was a friend of Greg Ginn and a staff engineer at Media Art recording studio, and Ginn invited him to play bass guitar with Panic in rehearsals after Kansas' departure. He later recalled his experience in the liner notes of Everything Went Black:

The band had a total of six songs, each of which lasted no longer than one minute. Greg showed me the simple repetitive chords..."OK, here we go, 1–2–3–4..." and BANG!! the drummer started smashing out a fast, trashy straight four-pattern beat, and the wiry little singer started bellowing and jumping around wildly, and Greg's body lurched forward as he underwent a remarkable transformation from Jekyll to Hyde...Within seconds it was over. Jekyll calmly stepped out of his Hyde as if stepping out of a routine nightmare...I was dumbfounded, shocked; my eyes wide in amazement, my mouth hanging open in disbelief. We played again. "1–2–3–4!!"...Ten minutes later we had played the entire six-song set twice.

Spot decided that he could not commit to playing with Panic, and was soon replaced by Würm bassist Gary McDaniel. Spot continued to work at Media Art and convinced Panic to record their first record there in January 1978, which produced the Nervous Breakdown EP. The studio's senior engineer, Dave Tarling, acted as producer for the session, with Spot's role limited to "setting up microphones and later running some rough mixes for the band."

==== Chuck Dukowski ====
Gary McDaniel was the bass guitarist of the band Würm, and met Greg Ginn when he sold the latter a speaker cabinet in early 1977. By that summer Würm were living and rehearsing at a space in the Hermosa Bathhouse, which they referred to as the Würmhole. Würm guitarist Ed Danky met Keith Morris and, learning that he was also in a band, invited him to hang out at their rehearsals. Morris and Greg Ginn came to observe Würm and ended up renting the vacant half of the Bathhouse for Panic, sharing practice space with Würm. When Spot decided that he could not commit to playing bass with Panic, McDaniel began jamming with them. He fit in well with the band musically, and impressed Ginn with his outspokenness and intellectual restlessness. By the end of the year Würm had broken up, and Ginn invited McDaniel to join Panic permanently. "I wanted to tour, I didn't just want to play in my living room", said McDaniel, "I thought Panic's music was easy to 'get'. It came across. Later, our music became more challenging to the audience; but back then, it hit heavy and hard, and people got it instantly."

McDaniel performed on Black Flag's debut EP, Nervous Breakdown, recorded in January 1978. Later that year the band was evicted from the Bathhouse, and McDaniel and Morris took up residence in their new rehearsal space "The Church", an abandoned Baptist church. By December 1979 McDaniel had quit his job working for a pool table company in order to commit himself to Black Flag and SST Records, and had taken the pseudonym Chuck Dukowski. "It was for fun, at first, just trying on personalities," he later said of the name change. "At first I didn't use Chuck all the time, but when I quit my straight job to work on the band full-time, I made a break. I found the new name to be convenient when I had to deal with the police. And I had to deal with them too fucking much. I liked the name Chuck Dukowski — it seemed like a regular guy name." Dukowski developed a prominent presence in Black Flag through both his playing—which was physically aggressive and produced powerful, thudding low-end notes—and through his intellect and passion for revolutionary thinking, which informed the band's ethos. An outspoken anarchist, he would often use interviews and between-song pauses during shows as opportunities to declare his ideas and beliefs.

==== Kira Roessler ====
Roessler (sister of Paul Roessler from L.A. gothic punk rock band 45 Grave) replaced Dukowski and played with the band through their mid-to-late period work (1983–85) appearing on the albums Family Man, Slip It In, Loose Nut, and In My Head.

==== C'el Revuelta ====
C'el joined the band in 1986 replacing Roesler on bass. He only played on the final tour of the band in 1986. He later came back in the 2003 Black Flag reunion. He did not appear in any of the releases. C'el died on May 3, 2017, after a long battle with stage 4 brain cancer.

==== Dave Klein ====
Klein is known for being a bass player in Screeching Weasel (2011–2013) and he went on tour with Black Flag in 2013. Klein left Black Flag in 2014.

==== Tyler Smith ====
Smith originally joined Black Flag in early 2013 but had to back out due to personal obligations back home. When he learned that the previous bass player left the band, he contacted Greg, auditioned again, and rejoined Black Flag.

==== Joseph Noval ====
Joseph Noval joined as the band's bassist in 2019.

==== Harley Duggan ====
Harley Duggan joined as the band's bassist in 2022. He also plays in Darkhorse Rising.

==== Austin Sears ====
Austin Sears joined as the band's bassist in 2023.

==== Matt Baxter ====
Matt Baxter joined as the band's bassist in 2024.

==== David Rodriguez ====
David Rodriguez joined as the band's current bassist in 2025.

=== Drummers ===
==== Bryan Migdol ====
Bryan Migdol (aka Brian Migdol) was recruited from amongst Morris' friends in early 1977 to serve as the drummer for Panic (the band that was the precursor to Black Flag). He performed at Panic's early shows and was developmental in the arrangement of many of the songs which would later be recorded by Black Flag. He played all the drum tracks on the band's debut EP, Nervous Breakdown, recorded in January 1978 at Media Art Studios, as well as some of the tracks appearing on the albums Everything Went Black, The First Four Years and Wasted…Again.

Disappointed with so much rehearsing and very little performing, he decided to leave the band in the summer of 1978. "Our mentality was, we were never popular, and playing music wasn't going to change that. We played because we needed to play — we played what we played because most of the time when we played, we were playing for ourselves. We did an awful lot of rehearsing, and that was because nobody wanted to hear what we were."

==== Robo ====
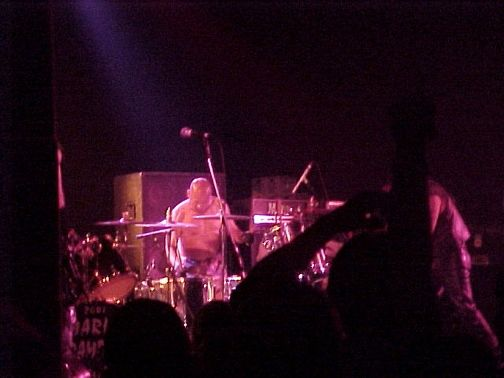
Robo with the Misfits in 2001

Colombian native Roberto Valverde replaced Migdol in Panic by the end of the summer of 1978. He had entered the United States on a student visa and was living in El Segundo, working in a plastics factory. He had begun playing drums in 1976 and responded to an advertisement that Panic had placed in a record store reading "Band from the South Bay looking for drummer. Into Ramones, Sex Pistols." Valverde impressed Panic with his audition, setting up his transparent perspex drum kit—which happened to match Ginn's transparent lucite guitar—so that all the drums and cymbals were level, and playing with a stiff, robotic style that relied on arm rather than wrist movement.

==== Emil Johnson ====
Emil Johnson was 15 when hired, although his place in the band was short lived. His only playing credit is the A-Side of the TV Party EP.

==== Chuck Biscuits ====
Chuck Biscuits played with Black Flag for several months in 1982. He appeared in no official studio releases, but does appear on the live album Live at the On Broadway 1982 and several bootlegs and demo recordings. Prior to joining Black Flag he had been a member of the Canadian hardcore punk band D.O.A. After leaving Black Flag he had a few brief stints playing drums with the Circle Jerks and the Red Hot Chili Peppers, though he was mostly out of the music industry until he began to work extensively with Glenn Danzig, appearing with his bands Samhain and Danzig, and later worked with Social Distortion. He has also had short stints with a number of other punk acts.

==== Bill Stevenson ====
Black Flag's fifth drummer was South Bay native Bill Stevenson. A Mira Costa High School student and avid fisherman, he frequented Jerry Morris' bait shop and ended up working there alongside Keith Morris. Stevenson first auditioned to drum for Panic in summer 1978, at age 15, after Brian Migdol had left the band. His audition turned into a drunken jam session including members of Panic and The Last, and the position of drummer in Panic ultimately went to Robo. By late 1978 Stevenson had joined the Descendents, who made their onstage debut as an opening act at Black Flag's second performance, at a San Pedro community center in February 1979. He would later join Black Flag as their regular drummer, and served with them from 1983 to 1985, appearing on all of their studio albums from My War through In My Head. After leaving Black Flag in mid-1985, he reformed the Descendents, and would later found the band All, and play drums with The Lemonheads.

==== Anthony Martinez ====
Anthony Martinez replaced Bill Stevenson and was their last drummer before their breakup. He played on the live album "Who's Got The 10 and a 1/2?" and the live EP "Annihilate This Week", which consists entirely of songs from Who's Got The 10 and a 1/2?

==== Gregory Moore ====
Gregory Moore is a drummer from Georgia who is sometimes credited as Gregory Amoore, or simply "Drummer". He has recorded and toured with Greg Ginn on several of his solo releases as well as Ginn's projects Gone, El Bad, and Get Me High. He performed with Black Flag at their 2003 reunion show, their tour in 2013, and on the "What the..." album. Gregory currently plays with the bands Are You A Cop, 2Ton Bridge, and Fer in Los Angeles.

==== Brandon Pertzborn ====
Brandon received an email from Greg in early 2014 to see if he would like to audition for Black Flag. He called Greg later that night and they set up an audition two days later. Brandon learned a good number of songs and then drove to Greg's studio to audition. Over the course of a few hours, Brandon played about 15 songs. After he drove back home, he recorded two songs a day and would send them to Greg every day for a week so Greg could get more of an idea what his playing style sounds like. A week after his audition, Brandon got the call that he made the band. Brandon did not know Mike or Greg personally before he started playing with Black Flag, but he had known who they were for years. As a Black Flag fan growing up, Pertzborn was familiar with Ginn's role with the band. Pertzborn used to skateboard in his spare time and knew of Mike Vallely's career as a professional streetskater and a musician.

Pertzborn is married to Emily Vallely, who is the daughter of former Black Flag lead singer Mike Vallely.

==== Isaias Gil ====
Isaias Gil joined as the band's drummer in 2019.

==== Charles Wiley ====
Charles Wiley joined as the band's drummer from 2022 to 2025.

==== Bryce Weston ====
Bryce Weston joined as the band's current drummer in 2025.

== Members ==
=== Current members (Black Flag) ===
Image	Name	Years active	Instruments	Release contributions
	Greg Ginn	1976–1986; 2003; 2013–2014; 2019–present	guitars; backing vocals; bass (1983, 2013)	all releases
	Max Zanelly	2025–present	lead vocals	none to date
	Dave Rodriguez	2025–present	bass	none to date
	Bryce Weston	2025–present	drums	none to date
	London Downey (filling in for Zanelly on the band's 2026 fall tour)	2026	lead vocals	none to date

=== Current members (Flag) ===
Image	Name	Years active	Instruments	Release contributions
	Keith Morris	1976–1979 (with Black Flag); 2011; 2013–present	vocals	Nervous Breakdown (1979); Everything Went Black (1982)
	Chuck Dukowski	1977–1983 (with Black Flag); 2011; 2013–present	bass; occasional lead vocals	all releases from Nervous Breakdown (1979) to Everything Went Black (1982); Slip It In' (1984)
	Dez Cadena	1980–1983 (with Black Flag); 2003; 2013–present	vocals; rhythm guitar	all releases from "Louie Louie" (1981) to Everything Went Black (1982)
	Bill Stevenson	1983–1985 (with Black Flag); 2011; 2013–present	drums	all releases from TV Party (1982) to In My Head (1985); Wasted...Again (1987); I Can See You (1989)
	Stephen Egerton	2011; 2013–present	lead guitar; backing vocals	none

=== Former members ===
Image	Name	Years active	Instruments	Release contributions
	Raymond Pettibon	1976	bass	artwork on releases from Nervous Breakdown (1979) to In My Head (1985)
	Bryan Migdol	1977–1978	drums	Nervous Breakdown (1979); Everything Went Black (1982)
	Kansas (Jim Dearmen)	1977	bass	none
	Glenn "Spot" Lockett	1977 (died 2023)	bass	production on Jealous Again EP (1980); Six Pack EP (1981); Damaged (1981); My War (1984); Family Man (1984) and Slip It In (1984)
	Roberto "Robo" Valverde	1978–1981; 2003	drums	all releases from Jealous Again EP (1980) to Damaged (1981); Everything Went Black (1982); The First Four Years (1983); Wasted...Again (1987)
	Ron Reyes	1979–1980; 2013	lead vocals	Jealous Again EP (1980); Everything Went Black (1982); The First Four Years (1983); Wasted...Again (1987); What The... (2013)
	Henry Rollins	1981–1986	lead vocals	Damaged (1981); TV Party EP (1982); all releases from My War (1984) to Who's Got the 10½? (1986); I Can See You (1989)
	Emil Johnson	1982	drums	TV Party EP (1982)
	Chuck Biscuits	1982	drums	The Complete 1982 Demos Plus More (1982); Live at the On Broadway 1982 (1982)
	Kira Roessler	1983–1985	bass; backing vocals	all releases from Family Man (1984) to Who's Got the 10½? (1986); I Can See You (1989)
	Anthony Martinez	1985–1986	drums	Who's Got The 10½? (1986); Annihilate This Week EP (1986)
	Cel Revuelta	1986; 2003 (died 2017)	bass	none
	Mike Vallely	2003; 2013–2014; 2019–2025	lead vocals	none
	Gregory Moore	2003; 2013–2014	drums; backing vocals	What The... (2013)
	Dave Klein	2013	bass	none
	Tyler Smith	2014	bass	none
	Brandon Pertzborn	2014	drums	none
	Isaias Gil	2019–2022	drums	none
	Joe Noval	2019–2022	bass	none
	Charles Wiley	2022–2025	drums	none
	Harley Duggan	2022–2023	bass	none
	Austin Sears	2023–2024	bass	none
	Brian “Butch” Sisk	2024 (One Show)	bass	none
	Matt Baxter	2024–2025	bass	none

== Line-ups ==
=== Black Flag ===
Period	Members	Releases
Summer 1976	Greg Ginn – guitars; Keith Morris – vocals; Raymond Pettibon – bass	
Early 1977 (as Panic)	Greg Ginn – guitars; Keith Morris – vocals; Bryan Migdol – drums; Jim "Kansas" Dearman – bass	
Summer 1977 (as Panic)	Greg Ginn – guitars; Keith Morris – vocals; Bryan Migdol – drums; Spot – bass	
1977 – Summer 1978	Greg Ginn – guitars; Keith Morris – vocals; Bryan Migdol – drums; Chuck Dukowski – bass	Nervous Breakdown (1979)
Summer 1978 – November 1979	Greg Ginn – guitars; Keith Morris – vocals; Chuck Dukowski – bass; Robo – drums	
November 1979 – May 1980	Greg Ginn – guitars; Chuck Dukowski – bass; Robo – drums; Ron Reyes – vocals	Jealous Again (1980)
May 1980 – August 1981	Greg Ginn – guitars; Chuck Dukowski – bass; Robo – drums; Dez Cadena – vocals	"Louie Louie" (1981); Six Pack (1981)
August – December 1981	Greg Ginn – lead guitar; Chuck Dukowski – bass; Robo – drums; Dez Cadena – rhythm guitar, backing vocals; Henry Rollins – lead vocals	Damaged (1981)
December 1981 – March 1982	Greg Ginn – lead guitar; Dez Cadena – rhythm guitar; Henry Rollins – vocals; Chuck Dukowski – bass; Bill Stevenson – drums (temporary member)	TV Party (1982) Side 2
March – July 1982	Greg Ginn – lead guitar; Dez Cadena – rhythm guitar, backing vocals; Henry Rollins – lead vocals; Chuck Dukowski – bass; Emil Johnson – drums	TV Party (1982) Side 1
July – December 1982	Greg Ginn – lead guitar; Chuck Dukowski – bass; Dez Cadena – rhythm guitar, backing vocals; Henry Rollins – lead vocals; Chuck Biscuits – drums	Live at the On Broadway 1982 (2010); 1982 Demos (1996)
January – April 1983	Greg Ginn – lead guitar; Chuck Dukowski – bass; Dez Cadena – rhythm guitar, backing vocals; Henry Rollins – lead vocals; Bill Stevenson – drums	
April – August 1983	Greg Ginn – guitars; Chuck Dukowski – bass; Henry Rollins – vocals; Bill Stevenson – drums	
August – December 1983	Greg Ginn – guitars, bass; Henry Rollins – vocals; Bill Stevenson – drums	My War (1984)
December 1983 – April 1985	Greg Ginn – guitars; Henry Rollins – lead vocals; Bill Stevenson – drums; Kira Roessler – bass, backing vocals	Family Man (1984); Slip It In (1984); Live '84 (1984); Loose Nut (1985); The Process of Weeding Out (1985); In My Head (1985); Minuteflag (1986); I Can See You (1989)
April – September 1985	Greg Ginn – guitars; Henry Rollins – lead vocals; Kira Roessler – bass, backing vocals; Anthony Martinez – drums	Who's Got the 10½? (1986); Annihilate This Week (1986)
September 1985 – August 1986	Greg Ginn – guitars; Henry Rollins – lead vocals; Anthony Martinez – drums; C'el Revuelta – bass	
Inactive 1986 – 2003
September 2003	Greg Ginn – lead guitar, backing vocals; C'el Revuelta – bass; Dez Cadena – rhythm guitar, co-lead vocals; Robo – drums; Mike Vallely – lead vocals; Gregory Moore – drums	
Inactive 2003 – 2013
January 2013 – November 2013	Greg Ginn – guitars, bass, backing vocals; Gregory Moore – drums; Ron Reyes – lead vocals; Dave Klein – bass (live)	What The... (2013)
November 2013 – January 2014	Greg Ginn – guitars, backing vocals; Gregory Moore – drums; Dave Klein – bass; Mike Vallely – lead vocals	
January 2014 – December 2014	Greg Ginn – guitars, backing vocals; Mike Vallely – lead vocals; Tyler Smith – bass; Brandon Pertzborn – drums	
Inactive 2014 – 2019
January 2019 – January 2022	Greg Ginn – guitars, backing vocals; Mike Vallely – lead vocals; Joseph Noval – bass; Isaias Gil – drums	
January 2022 – December 2023	Greg Ginn – guitars, backing vocals; Mike Vallely – lead vocals; Harley Duggan – bass; Charles Wiley – drums	
December 2023 – January 2024	Greg Ginn – guitars, backing vocals; Mike Vallely – lead vocals; Charles Wiley – drums; Austin Sears – bass	
May 2024 – April 2025	Greg Ginn – guitars, backing vocals; Mike Vallely – lead vocals; Charles Wiley – drums; Matt Baxter – bass	
April 2025 – present	Greg Ginn – guitars, backing vocals; Max Zanelly – lead vocals; Bryce Weston – drums; David Rodriguez – bass	

=== Flag ===
Period	Members	Releases
December 2011	Keith Morris – vocals; Chuck Dukowski – bass; Bill Stevenson – drums; Stephen Egerton – guitar	
January 2013–present	Keith Morris – vocals; Chuck Dukowski – bass; Bill Stevenson – drums; Stephen Egerton – lead guitar; Dez Cadena – vocals, rhythm guitar	
