= Wasted...Again =

Wasted…Again

Compilation album by Black Flag
- Released: 1987
- Recorded: January 1978 – March 1985
- Genre: Hardcore punk
- Length: 32:28
- Label: SST (166)

Black Flag chronology
Annihilate This Week (1987)	Wasted…Again (1987)	I Can See You (1989)

Professional ratings
Review scores
Source	Rating
AllMusic	4.5/5 stars
Christgau's Record Guide	A
The Encyclopedia of Popular Music	5/5 stars
The Great Rock Discography	7/10
MusicHound Rock	3/5 stars
(The New) Rolling Stone Album Guide	5/5 stars

Wasted…Again is an album released by American hardcore punk band Black Flag in 1987 on SST Records. It is a "best-of" compilation released after Black Flag's breakup in 1986. It features various songs about drinking and beer from their discography.

In 2005, Spin named it one of "The Ten Greatest Compilations of the Spin Era".

== Track listing ==
All tracks written by Greg Ginn except where noted

No.	Title	Writer(s)	Length
1.	"Wasted" (from the EP Nervous Breakdown)	Ginn, Keith Morris	0:51
2.	"TV Party" (from the EP TV Party)		3:31
3.	"Six Pack" (from the EP Six Pack)		2:20
4.	"I Don't Care" (from the compilation album Everything Went Black)	Ginn, Morris	1:00
5.	"I've Had It" (from the EP Nervous Breakdown)		1:24
6.	"Jealous Again" (from the EP Jealous Again)		1:52
7.	"Slip It In" (from the album Slip It In)		6:16
8.	"Annihilate This Week" (from the album Loose Nut)		4:44
9.	"Loose Nut" (from the album Loose Nut)		4:33
10.	"Gimmie Gimmie Gimmie" (from the compilation album Everything Went Black)		2:00
11.	"Louie, Louie" (from the single "Louie, Louie")	Richard Berry	1:20
12.	"Drinking and Driving" (from the album In My Head)	Ginn, Henry Rollins	3:22

== Personnel ==
- Keith Morris – vocals on 1, 4–5, 10
- Ron Reyes – vocals on 6
- Dez Cadena – vocals on 3, 11, rhythm guitar on 2
- Henry Rollins – vocals on 2, 7–9, 12
- Greg Ginn – lead guitar on all tracks
- Chuck Dukowski – bass on 1–6, 10–11
- Kira Roessler – bass on 7–9, 12
- Brian Migdol – drums on 1, 4–5, 10
- ROBO – drums on 2–3, 6, 11
- Bill Stevenson – drums on 7–9, 12
