= The First Four Years (album) =

Compilation album by Black Flag
- Released: 1983
- Recorded: January 1978 – April 1981 at Media Art Studios in Hermosa Beach, California
- Genre: Hardcore punk
- Length: 24:40
- Label: SST
- Producers: Spot, Geza X, Black Flag

Black Flag chronology
Everything Went Black (1983)	The First Four Years (1983)	My War (1984)

Professional ratings
Review scores
Source	Rating
AllMusic	3/5 stars
Alternative Rock	9/10
The Encyclopedia of Popular Music	4/5 stars
MusicHound Rock	2/5 stars
The Rolling Stone Album Guide	4/5 stars

The First Four Years is a compilation album by the American hardcore punk band Black Flag. It was released in 1983 on SST Records. The compilation consists of all of the group's material released before Henry Rollins became the band's vocalist in 1981. It collects the extended plays Nervous Breakdown (1979), Jealous Again (1980), Six Pack (1981), and the single "Louie Louie", with two tracks from various artists' compilation albums.

Tracks 1–4 are taken from Nervous Breakdown, tracks 5–9 are taken from Jealous Again, tracks 11–13 are from Six Pack, and tracks 15–16 are taken from the "Louie Louie" single. Tracks 10 and 14 were originally released on the New Alliance Records compilation albums Cracks in the Sidewalk (1980) and Chunks (1981), respectively.

In 2007, The Guardian included the album in their list of "1000 Albums to Hear Before You Die".

== Track listing ==
All tracks are written by Greg Ginn, except where noted.

No.	Title	Writer(s)	Length
1.	"Nervous Breakdown"		2:08
2.	"Fix Me"		0:57
3.	"I've Had It"		1:26
4.	"Wasted"	Keith Morris, Ginn	0:51
5.	"Jealous Again"		1:52
6.	"Revenge"		0:58
7.	"White Minority"		1:03
8.	"No Values"		1:45
9.	"You Bet We've Got Something Personal Against You!"	Chuck Dukowski, Ginn	0:52
10.	"Clocked In"		1:30
11.	"Six Pack"		2:19
12.	"I've Heard It Before"	Dukowski, Ginn	1:38
13.	"American Waste"	Dukowski	1:32
14.	"Machine"	Dukowski, Dez Cadena	1:25
15.	"Louie Louie"	Richard Berry, Additional lyrics by Cadena	1:18
16.	"Damaged I"	Ginn, Cadena	4:05
Total length:			24:40

== Personnel ==
- Keith Morris – lead vocals on tracks 1–4
- Ron Reyes – lead vocals on tracks 5–8
- Dez Cadena – lead vocals on tracks 10–16
- Greg Ginn – guitar
- Chuck Dukowski – bass, lead vocals on track 9
- Brian Migdol – drums on tracks 1–4
- Robo – drums on all other tracks

Production

- Spot; Geza X, Black Flag – producers
- Raymond Pettibon – artwork
