= What The... =

What The…

Studio album by Black Flag
- Released: November 5, 2013
- Recorded: 2013
- Genre: Hardcore punk
- Length: 43:55
- Label: SST (391)
- Producer: Greg Ginn

Black Flag chronology
Live at the On Broadway 1982 (2010)	What The… (2013)

What The… is the seventh studio album by American hardcore punk band Black Flag. The album was originally announced to be released on November 5, 2013, with 3 promotional singles being released between May and July. However, on November 5, What The… was only released through online streaming sources such as Spotify and Rdio, and a physical release date was pushed back to December 3, 2013. It is the band's first full-length studio album since In My Head (1985), marking the longest gap between two studio albums in their career, as well as being their first recording with vocalist Ron Reyes since Jealous Again (1980) and drummer Gregory "Drummer" Moore. This album also marked the first time since My War (1984) that guitarist Greg Ginn played bass on a Black Flag album under the name Dale Nixon. Three weeks after the album's release, Reyes was fired mid-show during a performance in Australia due to differences with Ginn. The band's manager and professional skateboarder Mike Vallely replaced Reyes on vocals.

== Artwork ==
Unlike the cover art of the majority of Black Flag's catalog, What The… was not designed or illustrated by Raymond Pettibon. Instead, the cover art was designed by vocalist Ron Reyes. This change was very negatively received. Gregory Adams of Exclaim! described the cover as "gasp-inducing," and said that it looked like, "a South Park character giving us the devil horns after getting juiced off a bag of Fun Dip." Marah Eakin of The A.V. Club described it as "downright hideous," and said that it looked like a, "mashup of some slime green globs, the Warheads candy guy, and Rude Dog." Michael Roffman of Consequence of Sound described it as "cringeworthy," and said that it was, "either a funny nod to '90s bumper stickers, or a sign at how well of a relationship Ginn still has with his brother/former Black Flag artist Raymond Pettibon. Either way? Yikes." In 2021, Simon Young of Kerrang! included the album in his list of "50 of the worst album covers ever" asking: "What better way to piss all over the visual legacy of your band’s back catalogue by smashing this out in 10 minutes using MS Paint?"

== Reception ==
Professional ratings
Aggregate scores
Source	Rating
Metacritic	42/100
Review scores
Source	Rating
AllMusic	2.5/5 stars
The A.V. Club	C−
Consequence of Sound	2/5 stars
Exclaim!	4/10
Kerrang!	1/5 stars
Pitchfork	4.9/10
Rock Sound	4/10

What The... was poorly received by music critics. At Metacritic, which assigns a normalized rating out of 100 to reviews from mainstream critics, the album received an average score of 42, based on 10 reviews, which indicates "mixed or average reviews".

AllMusic gave the album a rating of two and a half stars out of five. The reviewer felt that vocalist Ron Reyes "was never one of Black Flag's better vocalists, and he hasn't improved much after more than 30 years" and that "this music seems clumsy and half-hearted, and Ginn's interplay with new drummer Gregory Amoore [sic] feels sluggish and leaden at every turn."

By contrast, both the A.V. Club and Pitchfork found Reyes' vocals to be a strong suit of an overall disappointing album. The former described Reyes' vocals as "meaty and dripping, his voice is a hundred scabs being ripped off at once", and the latter found the vocalist to be the effort's "unlikely star". However, both reviews faulted the album for having inconsistent musical quality across 22 tracks, despite periodic highlights.

== Track listing ==
All tracks are written by Greg Ginn and Ron Reyes, except "Off My Shoulders" written solely by Ginn.

No.	Title	Length
1.	"My Heart's Pumping"	2:12
2.	"Down in the Dirt"	3:39
3.	"Blood and Ashes"	1:48
4.	"Now Is the Time"	1:47
5.	"Wallow in Despair"	1:30
6.	"Slow Your Ass Down"	1:50
7.	"It's So Absurd"	1:11
8.	"Shut Up"	1:43
9.	"This Is Hell"	2:01
10.	"Go Away"	2:32
11.	"The Bitter End"	2:02
12.	"The Chase"	2:17
13.	"I'm Sick"	1:45
14.	"It's Not My Time to Go-Go"	1:36
15.	"Lies"	2:47
16.	"Get Out of My Way"	1:01
17.	"Outside"	2:44
18.	"No Teeth"	1:44
19.	"To Hell and Back"	1:43
20.	"Give Me All Your Dough"	1:28
21.	"You Gotta Be Joking"	1:17
22.	"Off My Shoulders"	3:18

== Personnel ==
Personnel taken from What The... liner notes.

Black Flag

- Ron Reyes – lead vocals
- Greg Ginn – guitars, bass (credited as Dale Nixon), theremin, organ
- Gregory Moore – drums, backing vocals

Additional musicians

- Eric Vasquez – backing vocals
- Cliff Samuels – backing vocals
- Ron Raygunn – backing vocals
- Jose B – backing vocals
- The Ducky Boys of Granger Lake – backing vocals
- Mathew Cortez – drums (track 22)

Production

- Andy Batwinas – engineering
- Mike Shear – engineering
- Kill City Graphics – front cover art
- Jose B – back cover layout
