= Robo (musician) =

American drummer

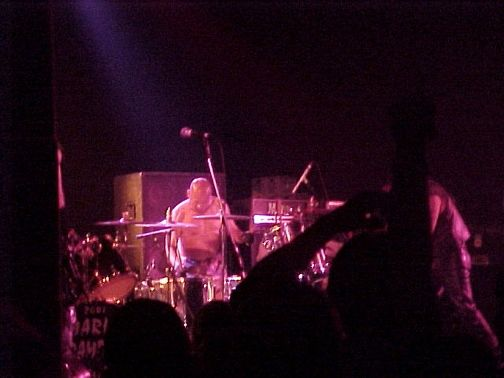
- Robo with Misfits (2001)

Background information
- Born: Julio Roberto Valverde Valencia; 1955 (age 70–71); Cali, Colombia
- Genres: Horror punk; punk rock; heavy metal; hardcore punk
- Occupations: Musician, drummer
- Instrument: Drums
- Years active: 1977–present
- Formerly of: Misfits, Black Flag

Julio Roberto Valverde Valencia (born 1955), better known by his stage name Robo, is a Colombian-American drummer. He came to prominence in the early 1980s with punk bands Black Flag and the Misfits.

== Life and career ==
Robo (at the time known by his birth name, Roberto Valverde), born in Cali, who came to the United States on a student visa in early 1975. He stayed after the visa expired.

Robo began playing drums in 1976, while living in El Segundo, California and working in a plastics factory. In 1978, he joined Black Flag as the band's second drummer, replacing Brian Migdol. He toured and recorded with them through 1981, performing on the EPs Jealous Again and Six Pack, and their first full-length album, Damaged. He was forced out of the band after being detained at Heathrow Airport over visa complications just prior to Black Flag's return from their 1981 UK tour; in order to fulfill existing commitments back in the US, the band replaced Robo before he was able to return to the country. When he did eventually return later that year, he learned that the Misfits were seeking a drummer. He relocated to New Jersey to join that band full-time, touring and recording the Earth A.D./Wolfs Blood album before quitting in the summer of 1983, a few months before The Misfits' final dissolution. Robo would eventually, along with Jerry and Doyle Caiafa and Frank LiCata (aka Franché Coma), be a party to the 1992 lawsuit against Glenn Danzig which led to the settlement of unpaid back royalties to Danzig's former Misfits bandmates, as well as provisions for the apportionment of future royalties and merchandising/licensing rights. This settlement was also significant in establishing the exclusive right of the plaintiffs, rather than Danzig, to perform and record as The Misfits moving forward, giving rise to the Caiafas' revamped version of the band from 1995 on.

In 2003, Robo drummed for Black Flag during their reunion shows. He was joined by Dez Cadena on vocals and rhythm guitar, Greg Ginn on lead guitar, and C'el Revuelta on bass. In 2005, he rejoined the Misfits, then featuring Jerry Only on bass and vocals and fellow former Black Flag member Cadena on guitar. When touring, the band played Misfits songs as well as Black Flag songs, with Cadena singing the Black Flag songs. Robo appeared on the "Land of the Dead" single.

He was briefly mentioned in the Jim Jarmusch short film Coffee and Cigarettes: Somewhere in California by Iggy Pop, who suggested using Robo's drumming talents to an offended Tom Waits.

Robo has been married once, to Barbara Mazzone Valverde, and they have one son, Vincent Valverde (formerly of the band TALP), who was born on December 6, 1985. Robo and Barbara subsequently divorced.

In 2010, Robo dropped out of the Misfits due to passport troubles.

On January 25, 2013, it was announced that Robo would be participating in Black Flag's upcoming reunion show at Hevy Music Festival in Folkestone, their first UK show in 30 years, in August. A few days later, it was announced that Gregory Moore would be the drummer for Black Flag, not Robo.

== Playing style ==
Robo's drum style relies heavily on open high-hat to generate the frenetic sounds on early Black Flag records. His signature drum kit during that era was transparent to match Greg Ginn's see-through Dan Armstrong guitar, and was unique in that all of the drums and cymbals were parallel to the ground rather than tilted towards him in the typical style. He was also known for wearing plastic and metal bracelets during concerts and recording sessions; they can sometimes be heard faintly clattering on recordings. While many drummers utilize a style which uses quick movements originating from the wrist, Robo's style consists of stiff, robotic movements of the entire arm. His stage name was given to him by his Black Flag bandmates, and is both a play on his name (Roberto) and a reference to his drumming style.

== Discography ==
=== Black Flag ===
- Jealous Again EP (SST Records, 1980)
- "Six Pack" EP (SST Records, 1981)
- "Louie Louie" single (Posh Boy Records, 1981)
- Damaged (SST Records, 1981)
- Everything Went Black compilation (SST Records, 1983) – selected tracks
- The First Four Years compilation (SST Records, 1983) – selected tracks
- Wasted...Again compilation (SST Records, 1987) – selected tracks

Note: Robo was credited as the drummer on early pressings of Black Flag's Nervous Breakdown EP but did not play on the actual recording.

=== The Misfits ===
- Earth A.D./Wolfs Blood (1983)
- "Die, Die My Darling" single (1984) – selected tracks
- Misfits compilation (1986) – selected tracks
- Collection II compilation (1995) – selected tracks
- The Misfits Box Set (1996) – selected tracks
- Cuts from the Crypt (2001) – on the song "Rise Above"
- "Land of the Dead" single (2009)
