= 1982 Demos =

The Complete 1982 Demos

Demo album by Black Flag
- Released: 1996 (self-released)
- Recorded: 1982 (1-10 tracks); 1984 (11-16 tracks)
- Studio: Total Access
- Genre: Hardcore punk; post-hardcore; sludge metal
- Length: 63:03
- Label: (self-released)
- Producer: Black Flag

Professional ratings
Review scores
| Source | Rating |
|---|---|
| AllMusic | 4/5 stars |

The Complete 1982 Demos is an unreleased set of demo tracks intended for a follow-up album to Black Flag's debut album Damaged (1981).

The tracks recorded show the band moving in a riff-driven, heavy metal-inflected direction, away from the pure hardcore punk of the first album. Due to legal issues, the album was never recorded, though most of the tracks were re-recorded for later albums. Though never officially released, the recordings have been widely bootlegged.

A version of the album called "The Complete 1982 Demos Plus More!" exists, which includes a separate bootleg named "1984 Radio Tokyo Demos". These were recorded live on radio in 1984, as the name would suggest. The original Tokyo bootleg consisted of 5 songs, along with an interview, an intro and an outro, bringing the total to 8 songs. However only "I Love You", "My War", "The Swinging Man" and the interview were included on the re-release of the 1982 demos.

== History ==
Following their debut album Damaged (1981), Black Flag underwent several personnel shifts and debuted a number of songs in their live shows. In contrast to the straightforward hardcore punk of the debut, the new songs tended toward being slower in tempo with pronounced metal elements and included funk and jazz touches. The band found themselves locked in a protracted legal battle with Unicorn Records, a subsidiary of MCA Records, who had distributed Damaged. A legal injunction prevented Black Flag from recording under their name, severely cutting into the band members' income.

Drummer Chuck Biscuits, tired of the group's legal battles, left in the winter of 1982 amid personal clashes and creative disagreements. He was followed by guitarist Dez Cadena, who left in 1983 to form the band DC3.

The recordings have never been officially released, but have been widely bootlegged. Patrick Kennedy of AllMusic described this edition of Black Flag as "possibly their strongest lineup" and the demos as "the most visceral and brutal set of Black Flag recordings available".

== Recording ==
The band recorded demos of ten songs at the studio Total Access. Recording and mixing took one night.

== Track listing ==
Standard Edition
| No. | Title | Writer(s) | Length |
|---|---|---|---|
| 1. | "What Can You Believe?" | Dez Cadena | 2:57 |
| 2. | "Yes, I Know" | Cadena | 2:36 |
| 3. | "Slip It In" | Greg Ginn | 5:26 |
| 4. | "Modern Man" | Chuck Dukowski, Ed Danky | 2:40 |
| 5. | "My War" | Dukowski | 3:33 |
| 6. | "Black Coffee" | Ginn | 5:04 |
| 7. | "Beat My Head Against the Wall" | Ginn | 2:22 |
| 8. | "Can't Decide" | Ginn | 5:22 |
| 9. | "I Love You" | Dukowski | 3:32 |
| 10. | "Nothing Left Inside/Scream" | Ginn, Henry Rollins | 11:33 |

1984 Radio Tokyo
| No. | Title | Length |
|---|---|---|
| 11. | "I Love You" | 3:33 |
| 12. | "My War" | 3:48 |
| 13. | "Interview" | 3:00 |
| 14. | "The Swinging Man" | 2:36 |
| 15. | "Three Nights" | 6:28 |
| 16. | "Wound Up" | 4:19 |

== Personnel ==
The lineup for these recordings never played together on an official album.

- Henry Rollins – vocals
- Greg Ginn – lead guitar, rhythm guitar on "What Can You Believe?" and "Yes, I Know", 1st guitar solo on "Slip It In"
- Dez Cadena – rhythm guitar, lead guitar on "What Can You Believe?" and "Yes, I Know", 2nd guitar solo on "Slip It In"
- Chuck Dukowski – bass
- Chuck Biscuits – drums
