= Live at the On Broadway 1982 =

Live album by Black Flag
- Released: November 1, 2010
- Recorded: July 23–24, 1982
- Venue: On Broadway in San Francisco
- Genre: Hardcore punk
- Length: 91:22
- Label: CD Presents

Black Flag chronology
I Can See You (1989)	Live at the On Broadway 1982 (2010)	What The... (2013)

Live at the On Broadway 1982 is a live album by the hardcore punk band Black Flag. The album features 2 separate live performances from the band performing at the On Broadway venue July 23–24, 1982. It is the only official Black Flag release to feature Chuck Biscuits on drums.

== Track listing ==
All tracks are written by Greg Ginn, except where noted.

July 23, 1982
No.	Title	Length
1.	"No Martyrs" (Dez Cadena)	3:31
2.	"I've Heard It Before" (Ginn, Chuck Dukowski)	2:33
3.	"Room 13" (Ginn, Medea)	1:19
4.	"Depression"	2:30
5.	"Can't Decide"	4:42
6.	"Nervous Breakdown"	1:49
7.	"Jealous Again"	2:16
8.	"Scream"	4:31
9.	"Six Pack"	2:10
10.	"No Values"	3:00
11.	"I've Had It"	1:18
12.	"My Life" (Ginn, Henry Rollins; alternate version of "Damaged I")	8:59
13.	"I've Got to Run"	1:58
14.	"My Rules"	1:01
15.	"Modern Man" (Ed Danky, Dukowski)	2:22
16.	"Beat My Head Against the Wall"	2:02
17.	"Fix Me"	1:31
18.	"Rise Above"	4:44
19.	"TV Party"	3:00
20.	"Wasted" (Ginn, Keith Morris)	1:00
21.	"Revenge"	2:11
Total length:		58:27

July 24, 1982
No.	Title	Length
1.	"Scream"	5:47
2.	"Jazz Poetry" (interlude)	1:14
3.	"Revenge"	1:08
4.	"I've Got to Run"	1:26
5.	"My Rules"	1:03
6.	"I've Heard It Before" (Ginn, Dukowski)	1:41
7.	"Room 13" (Ginn, Medea)	2:01
8.	"Depression"	2:35
9.	"I've Had It"	1:31
10.	"Nervous Breakdown"	2:12
11.	"Jealous Again"	1:48
12.	"My Life" (Ginn, Rollins; alternate version of "Damaged I")	10:29
Total length:		32:55

== Personnel ==
- Henry Rollins – vocals
- Greg Ginn – lead guitar, rhythm guitar on "No Martyrs"
- Dez Cadena – rhythm guitar, lead guitar on "No Martyrs", backing vocals
- Chuck Dukowski – bass, backing vocals
- Chuck Biscuits – drums
