= I Can See You (EP) =

EP by Black Flag
- Released: 1989
- Recorded: January 1985, March 1985
- Genre: Post-hardcore; experimental rock
- Length: 10:34
- Label: SST (226)
- Producer: Greg Ginn

Black Flag chronology
Wasted...Again (1987)	I Can See You (1989)	Live at the On Broadway 1982 (2010)

Professional ratings
Review scores
Source	Rating
AllMusic	3/5 stars

I Can See You is the sixth EP by American hardcore punk band Black Flag. It was released three years after their breakup and was their last studio recording for 24 years, until the release of their seventh studio album What The... in 2013. The material was recorded before the departure of drummer Bill Stevenson and bassist Kira Roessler, and three of the tracks were originally included on the cassette and CD editions of the In My Head (1985) album.

== Track listing ==
All songs written by Henry Rollins and Greg Ginn except where noted.

1. "I Can See You" – (Ginn) 3:19
2. "Kickin' & Stickin'" – 1:23
3. "Out of This World" – (Kira Roessler/Bill Stevenson) – 2:12
4. "You Let Me Down" – 3:40

== Personnel ==
Personnel taken from I Can See You liner notes.

Black Flag

- Henry Rollins – vocals
- Kira Roessler – bass
- Bill Stevenson – drums
- Greg Ginn – guitar

Additional personnel

- Greg Ginn – production
- Dave Tapling – engineering
