= Annihilate This Week =

Live album (EP) by Black Flag
- Released: 1986
- Recorded: August 23, 1985
- Venue: The Starry Night in Portland, Oregon
- Genre: Hardcore punk
- Length: 11:55
- Label: SST (081)
- Producer: Greg Ginn

Black Flag chronology
Who's Got the 10½? (1986)	Annihilate This Week (1986)	Wasted...Again (1987)

Professional ratings
Review scores
Source	Rating
AllMusic	2/5 stars

Annihilate This Week is a single by American hardcore punk band Black Flag. It contains songs from Who's Got the 10½? The cover, which features numerous items of drug paraphernalia, was banned in some record stores.

== Track listing ==
Side one

1. "Annihilate This Week" (Ginn) – 4:14

Side two

1. "Best One Yet" (Roessler/Rollins) – 2:35
2. "Sinking" (Ginn/Rollins) – 5:04

== Personnel ==
- Henry Rollins – vocals
- Greg Ginn – guitar
- Kira Roessler – bass
- Anthony Martinez – drums
