= In My Head (album) =

Studio album by Black Flag
- Released: October 1985
- Recorded: October 1984, January 1985, March 1985
- Studios: Total Access, Redondo Beach, California
- Genres: Hardcore punk; punk rock; post-hardcore; heavy metal
- Length: 37:12; 47:31 (original cassette and CD reissue)
- Label: SST (045)
- Producers: Greg Ginn, Bill Stevenson, David Tarling

Black Flag chronology
The Process of Weeding Out (1985)	In My Head (1985)	Minuteflag (1986)

In My Head is the sixth studio album by American punk band Black Flag. It was released in 1985 on SST Records, and was their final studio album before their breakup in 1986. The CD reissue adds three of the four songs that later appeared on the I Can See You EP, replicating the original 1985 cassette release which came out concurrent to the LP.

After building a reputation for confrontational hardcore punk, late-era Black Flag turned to a more experimental, heavy metal-inflected sound, in particular on their last two albums. Greg Ginn intended In My Head to be his first solo album. The cover is a collage of six drawings by Ginn's brother Raymond Pettibon which SST cut up and used without paying him and without his permission, resulting in Raymond cutting ties with the label.

== Reception ==
Professional ratings
Review scores
Source	Rating
AllMusic	4.5/5 stars
The Encyclopedia of Popular Music	3/5 stars
The Great Rock Discography	6/10
MusicHound Rock	3.5/5 stars
Punknews	5/5 stars
The Rolling Stone Album Guide	3/5 stars
Sounds	5/5 stars
Spin Alternative Record Guide	6/10

The album received very positive reviews upon release. Robert Palmer, writing for The New York Times, found the music to be "intriguingly, sometimes dazzlingly fresh and sophisticated, but the band hasn't had to sacrifice an iota of the raw intensity and directness that are punk's spiritual center." He compared the "polyphony of shifting shapes that is the principal guitar motif in the brilliant 'White Hot'" to "listening to the once-revolutionary guitar break from the Yardbirds' mid-60's hit 'Shapes of Things' while one's turntable goes up in flames." "Yet for all its sophistication," he continued, "this is jagged, abrasive rock and roll, music hard and direct enough to appeal to any punk or hard-rock fan. [...] 'In My Head' is the sound of heavy metal rock as it could be but almost never is, metal without the posturing, the pointless displays of fretboard prowess, the bashing rhythm sections and banal lyrics that have become endemic to the idiom." It also notably received a full score from the English music magazine Sounds, which found it to be even better than the band's debut.

Retrospective reviews have also been largely positive. Punknews found the album to be more innovative and better produced than its predecessors, while John Dougan of AllMusic called it "some of the best contemporary rock music extant." Louder Sound called it "one of the group's finest albums, with [its] foreboding title track its most gloriously tortured moment. [...] Healthy people don't make music like this, and indeed, soon after its release Black Flag were done." "Early Black Flag releases like Nervous Breakdown, Damaged, and My War spawned tons of imitators," wrote BrooklynVegan, "and there's no way to overstate how influential they are, but In My Head has something else going for it. Over three decades later, you rarely hear other music that sounds like this."

== Track listing ==
All tracks are written by Greg Ginn, except where noted.

Side A
No.	Title	Writer(s)	Length
1.	"Paralyzed"	Ginn; Rollins	2:39
2.	"The Crazy Girl"		2:46
3.	"Black Love"		2:42
4.	"White Hot"	Ginn; Rollins	4:59
5.	"In My Head"	Ginn; Rollins	4:30

Side B
No.	Title	Writer(s)	Length
6.	"Drinking and Driving"	Ginn; Rollins	3:16
7.	"Retired at 21"		4:56
8.	"Society's Tease"		6:09
9.	"It's All Up to You"		5:14

Cassette/CD editions
No.	Title	Writer(s)	Length
1.	"Paralyzed"	Ginn; Rollins	2:39
2.	"The Crazy Girl"		2:46
3.	"Black Love"		2:42
4.	"White Hot"	Ginn; Rollins	4:59
5.	"In My Head"	Ginn; Rollins	4:30
6.	"Out of This World"	Roessler; Stevenson	2:13
7.	"I Can See You"		3:22
8.	"Drinking and Driving"	Ginn; Rollins	3:16
9.	"Retired at 21"		4:56
10.	"Society's Tease"		6:09
11.	"It's All Up to You"		5:14
12.	"You Let Me Down"	Rollins; Stevenson	3:40

- Tracks 6, 7 and 12 reissued in 1989 on the I Can See You EP.

== Personnel ==
Black Flag

- Henry Rollins – vocals
- Greg Ginn – guitar
- Kira Roessler – bass, backing vocals
- Bill Stevenson – drums

Production

- Greg Ginn – production
- Dave Tarling – engineering
- Michael Boshears – mixing
- Raymond Pettibon – artwork

== Works cited ==
- Earles, Andrew (2014). Gimme Indie Rock: 500 Essential American Underground Rock Albums 1981–1996. Voyageur Press. ISBN 978-0-7603-4648-8.
- Chick, Stevie (2011). Spray Paint the Walls: The Story of Black Flag. PM Press. ISBN 978-1-60486-584-4.
