= Damaged (Black Flag album) =

Studio album by Black Flag
- Released: November 1981
- Studio: Unicorn Studios (West Hollywood, California)
- Genre: Hardcore punk
- Length: 34:58
- Label: SST (007)
- Producers: Spot; Black Flag

Black Flag chronology
Six Pack (1981)	Damaged (1981)	TV Party (1982)

Damaged is the debut studio album by the American hardcore punk band Black Flag. It was released by SST Records in November 1981.

The album was largely ignored by critics and the public at the time of its release, but has since been recognized as a classic and one of the most influential punk rock records ever made, appearing on a number of "best of" lists by fans and critics alike. The album was ranked number 340 on Rolling Stone's 2012 list of The 500 Greatest Albums of All Time, though moving down to number 487 in the 2020 revision. Pitchfork also ranked it number 25 on its list of the Top 100 Albums of the 1980s.

== Background ==
Black Flag had made at least two cancelled attempts to record a full-length album since the release of its first extended play Nervous Breakdown, with singers Keith Morris, Ron Reyes, and Dez Cadena. Some of the Reyes sessions became the Jealous Again EP, while selections from two of many Cadena sessions became the Six Pack EP and the "Louie Louie"/"Damaged I" single; other session outtakes later comprised the Everything Went Black double album.

By the time Damaged was recorded, Cadena had moved to rhythm guitar, a position he had initially intended to take when Reyes was still in the band. The new lead vocalist was 20-year-old Washington, DC expatriate Henry Rollins, hired a few weeks before the sessions occurred. Unlike Reyes (who had never sung in a studio before joining Black Flag) and Cadena (who had not even sung at all before joining the band), Rollins already had one recording credit to his name with the short-lived DC hardcore punk band State of Alert, who recorded No Policy, an EP released earlier that year on Dischord Records.

The band recorded their backing tracks without Rollins, who overdubbed vocals with band members Greg Ginn (guitar) and Chuck Dukowski (bass) coaching him afterward. The most complicated vocal tracks ended up being Dukowski's "What I See", which was supposed to have an improvised speech in the song's bridge but ended up having one written out by Dukowski when Rollins could not come up with anything that he was satisfied with, and "T.V. Party", which featured backing vocals from the entire band.

The album was recorded at Unicorn Studios, on Santa Monica Blvd in West Hollywood. The band was living and rehearsing in another part of the building that housed Unicorn Studios prior to the sessions.

Drummer Robo was wearing bracelets on his left wrist that rattled when he played. The rattling sound of the bracelets is audible on Damaged whenever he hit his snare drum, especially on downbeats.

The version of "Rise Above" on the album was recorded at an earlier session with Rollins and was intended as a standalone single release. Another version was recorded during the album sessions but the band abandoned it and decided to include the single version instead for Damaged.

The closing track, "Damaged I", is Rollins's first writing credit with the band. In his book Get in the Van, Rollins reports he improvised new lyrics each time the song was performed live. For Damaged, the first of two takes of the song was used.

== Cover art ==
The cover art, taken by punk photographer Ed Colver, depicts Rollins putting his fist through a mirror. The effect was made by cracking the mirror with a hammer, while the "blood" on Rollins's wrist is a mixture of red ink and coffee. The photograph has been described as "iconic" in the pages of Artforum.

== Business disputes with Unicorn ==
Black Flag's distribution deal with Unicorn—which was associated with MCA Records—resulted in an initial pressing of 25,000 copies. In September 1981, MCA refused to distribute the album after the label's president, Al Bergamo, objected to its lyrical content. Speaking with the Los Angeles Times, Bergamo stated: "I'm not the kind of guy who believes in burning books, but this record bothered me. As a parent with two children, I found it an anti-parent record, past the point of good taste. I listened to it all last weekend and it just didn't seem to have any redeeming social value." Subsequently, the members of Black Flag personally visited the pressing plant to apply a sticker over the MCA logo which read, "As a parent ... I found it an anti-parent record"—thus essentially throwing Bergamo's words back in his face.

Longtime SST employee Joe Carducci has reported that the "anti-parent" statement was a red herring. In fact, according to Carducci, Unicorn Records was so poorly managed and so deeply in debt that MCA lost money in distributing Damaged, regardless of its content, and was eager to sever its relationship with Unicorn by any possible pretext.

SST and Unicorn ended up distributing Damaged through an independent distributor; it arrived in stores in late November 1981. As a result, Unicorn filed a lawsuit against Black Flag and SST, claiming breach of contract. Black Flag were suddenly enjoined from recording any more records under their own name, although SST were able to continue with its own release schedule, releasing The Minutemen's The Punch Line and the debuts of the Meat Puppets and Saccharine Trust. However, Unicorn released a single of an updated "T.V. Party" before the legal trouble started, a recording commissioned by MCA for the soundtrack to the film Repo Man.

The legal dispute between Black Flag and Unicorn tied the band up for almost two years, during which time they released Everything Went Black, a double album of pre-Rollins outtakes, under the names of the individual musicians and vocalists on the record. Unicorn ended up filing even more legal briefs, claiming that Black Flag had violated a court injunction against releasing new records. Ginn and Dukowski ended up doing several days in Los Angeles County Jail for contempt of court, but the case fizzled out soon afterward when Unicorn went out of business, freeing Black Flag of any further obligation to the label.

== Known outtakes and alternate versions ==
In addition to the known unreleased version of "Rise Above" recorded during the album sessions and the alternate take of "Damaged I", a version of Black Flag's arrangement of "Louie Louie" was also recorded. According to Rollins in Get in the Van, this version featured the band going into "a strange jam at the end until the tape ran out;" It was never mixed down in any form. As of July 2006, it was unknown if the master tapes to these outtakes were still in existence. Henry Rollins later stated on his radio show's blog that alternate versions of "What I See" and "at least one other song that I can't remember" also came out of the Damaged sessions, and that other outtakes from Black Flag's other albums also exist.

According to Black Flag's engineer and live sound man Spot, a nearly complete version of Damaged was recorded at Golden Age Studios with Dez Cadena doing vocal duties. This session is where the tracks for the Six Pack EP came from. No official version of the remainder of this recording session has ever been released, although unlicensed copies have circulated in tape trading circles for years. A comparison of the unreleased Dez Cadena sessions with the released LP suggests that the vocal cadence and presentation of the Cadena sessions were used as a reference by the band prior to recording the final album.

An alternate version of "Depression" was recorded to be the b-side of the "Rise Above" single.

== Reception and legacy ==
Retrospective professional ratings
Review scores
Source	Rating
AllMusic	5/5 stars
Christgau's Record Guide	A−
The Encyclopedia of Popular Music	4/5 stars
The Great Rock Discography	8/10
MusicHound Rock	3/5 stars
Music Story	4.5/5 stars
Pitchfork	9.2/10
The Rolling Stone Album Guide	4.5/5 stars
Sounds	5/5 stars
Spin Alternative Record Guide	10/10

Reviewing for The Village Voice in January 1982, Robert Christgau was generally positive toward the album: "Although the B side drags more painfully than I bet was intended, this is powerful stuff. Greg Ginn is the greatest noise guitarist since Johnny Thunders, new vocalist Henry Rollins can snarl along any tortured contour they serve up, and 'Rise Above,' 'Six Pack,' and the uproarious 'TV Party' prove they can write songs as well as gnash fragments. Inspirational Verse: 'I wanna live/I wish I was dead.'"

While the album did not gain much attention from the general press on its original release, the album retrospectively has been given critical acclaim and has been cited as one of the most important hardcore punk albums ever released. Rolling Stone in their retrospective review says that "Black Flag lived up to it, defining L.A. hardcore punk with violent guitar and the pissed-off scream of Henry Rollins, especially on "TV Party" and "Rise Above." Punks still listen to Damaged, and parents still hate it." Pitchfork in their retrospective review from 2002 says "Black Flag took on the essential ferocity of men about to snap, and combined that with an acidic sense of humor and these things called 'songs', a concept that many of the wannabe punkers of the day were still trying to sort out. Damaged hit in 1981, and by 1982, four bars bearing the Black Flag name had been airbrushed across miles and miles of spiked leather. Conflicting feelings of violence, apathy, rage, and self-satire course through this one, the essential touchstone of the entire genre of West Coast hardcore, crystallizing the turmoil of the movement. Listen to 'Rise Above' and try not to be incensed, then listen to 'TV Party' and try not to laugh out loud. That's awesome." John Dougan of AllMusic gave it a perfect five star rating saying "... Although Black Flag had been recording for three years prior to this release, the fact that Henry Rollins was now their lead singer made all the difference. His furious bellow and barely contained ferocity was the missing piece the band needed to become great. Also, guitarist/mastermind Greg Ginn wrote a slew of great songs for this record that, while suffused with the usual punk conceits (alienation, boredom, disenfranchisement), were capable of making one laugh out loud, especially the protoslacker satire 'TV Party' ..." and also noted "... Extremely controversial when it was released, Damaged endured the slings and arrows of outrageous criticism (some reacted as though this record would alone cause the fall of America's youth) to become and remain an important document of its time."

Kurt Cobain listed it in his top fifty albums of all time. Over the years since the album's original release it has been recognized as a punk rock classic and one of the most influential punk rock records ever made by appearing on a number of "best of" lists by magazines and critics. The album was ranked number 340 on Rolling Stone's list of The 500 Greatest Albums of All Time. Pitchfork also ranked it number 25 on its "Top 100 Albums of the 1980s". The album was also included in the book 1001 Albums You Must Hear Before You Die.

== Release variations ==
- A 1982 European release issued by Roadrunner Records' RoadRacer imprint substitutes the later single version of "T.V. Party" for the album version on side one, and adds the Dez Cadena-led single version of "Louie Louie" to the end of side two.
- The initial CD reissue of Damaged appended the Jealous Again EP. All subsequent versions contain the original album only.

== Track listing ==
All tracks by Greg Ginn unless noted.

Side one
No.	Title	Writer(s)	Length
1.	"Rise Above"		2:26
2.	"Spray Paint"	Chuck Dukowski, Ginn	0:34
3.	"Six Pack"		2:20
4.	"What I See"	Dukowski	1:56
5.	"TV Party"		3:31
6.	"Thirsty and Miserable"	Rosa Medea, Dez Cadena, Robo	2:06
7.	"Police Story"		1:30
8.	"Gimmie Gimmie Gimmie"		1:47

Side two
No.	Title	Writer(s)	Length
1.	"Depression"		2:28
2.	"Room 13"	Medea, Ginn	2:04
3.	"Damaged II"		3:23
4.	"No More"	Dukowski	2:25
5.	"Padded Cell"	Dukowski, Ginn	1:47
6.	"Life of Pain"		2:50
7.	"Damaged I"	Henry Rollins, Ginn	3:50
Total length:			34:58

== Personnel ==
Black Flag

- Henry Rollins – lead vocals
- Dez Cadena – guitar, backing vocals
- Greg Ginn – guitar
- Chuck Dukowski – bass
- Robo – drums

Production

- Spot – production, engineer
- Black Flag – production
- Francis Buckley – engineer, mixing
- Chuck Vogt – assistant engineer
- Ed Colver – cover photos
