= The Process of Weeding Out =

EP by Black Flag
- Released: September 1985
- Recorded: March 1985
- Genre: Jazz rock, instrumental rock, experimental music
- Length: 26:28
- Label: SST (037)
- Producer: Greg Ginn, Bill Stevenson, David Tarling

Black Flag chronology
Loose Nut (1985)	The Process of Weeding Out (1985)	In My Head (1985)

The Process of Weeding Out is the fifth EP by American band Black Flag. One of the most potent realizations of guitarist Greg Ginn's fascination with the avant-garde, The Process of Weeding Out is described by critic Chris True of AllMusic as "an interesting document of Greg Ginn's development from high-speed guitar 'sculptor' to one of the few punk artists to embrace 12-tone experimental music." Because of the jazz influences by Ginn, all of the tracks are instrumental.

The back cover has a quote from Ginn, reading, in part:

"...even though this record may communicate certain feelings, emotions, and ideas to some, I have faith that cop-types with their strictly linear minds and stick-to-the-rules mentality don't have the ability to decipher the intuitive contents of this record."

== Reception ==
Professional ratings
Review scores
Source	Rating
All About Jazz	Positive
AllMusic	2.5/5 stars
Punknews.org	3/5 stars

Robert Palmer of The New York Times described the album as "what jazz-rock could have become if the best of the musicians who first crossbred jazz improvising with rock's sonic fire power had followed their most creative impulses."

Byron Coley at Spin said, "Greg Ginn heralds the fourth stage of his ascension to heaven via strings. A hypnotically churning stew pot of murk, riff, and raff."

== Track listing ==
All songs by Greg Ginn, except where noted.

Side one

1. "Your Last Affront" – 9:39
2. "Screw the Law" – 2:24

Side two

1. "The Process of Weeding Out" – 9:58
2. "Southern Rise" (Ginn/Kira Roessler/Bill Stevenson) – 5:00

== Personnel ==
- Greg Ginn – guitar
- Kira Roessler – bass
- Bill Stevenson – drums

Production

- Greg Ginn – production
- Bill Stevenson – production
- Dave Tarling – production, engineering
- Raymond Pettibon – cover art
