= TV Party (EP) =

EP by Black Flag
- Released: July 1982
- Recorded: March 1982
- Genre: Hardcore punk
- Length: 6:49
- Label: SST (012)
- Producer: Black Flag; Ed Barton

Black Flag chronology
Damaged (1981)	TV Party (1982)	Everything Went Black (1982)

TV Party is the fourth EP by American band Black Flag, released in 1982. It was self-produced with Ed Barton and originally released by SST Records on the 7" vinyl format. The title track is a satire of boredom, drinking and America's obsession with television; the original version was also released on the band's 1981 debut album, Damaged.

== Production ==
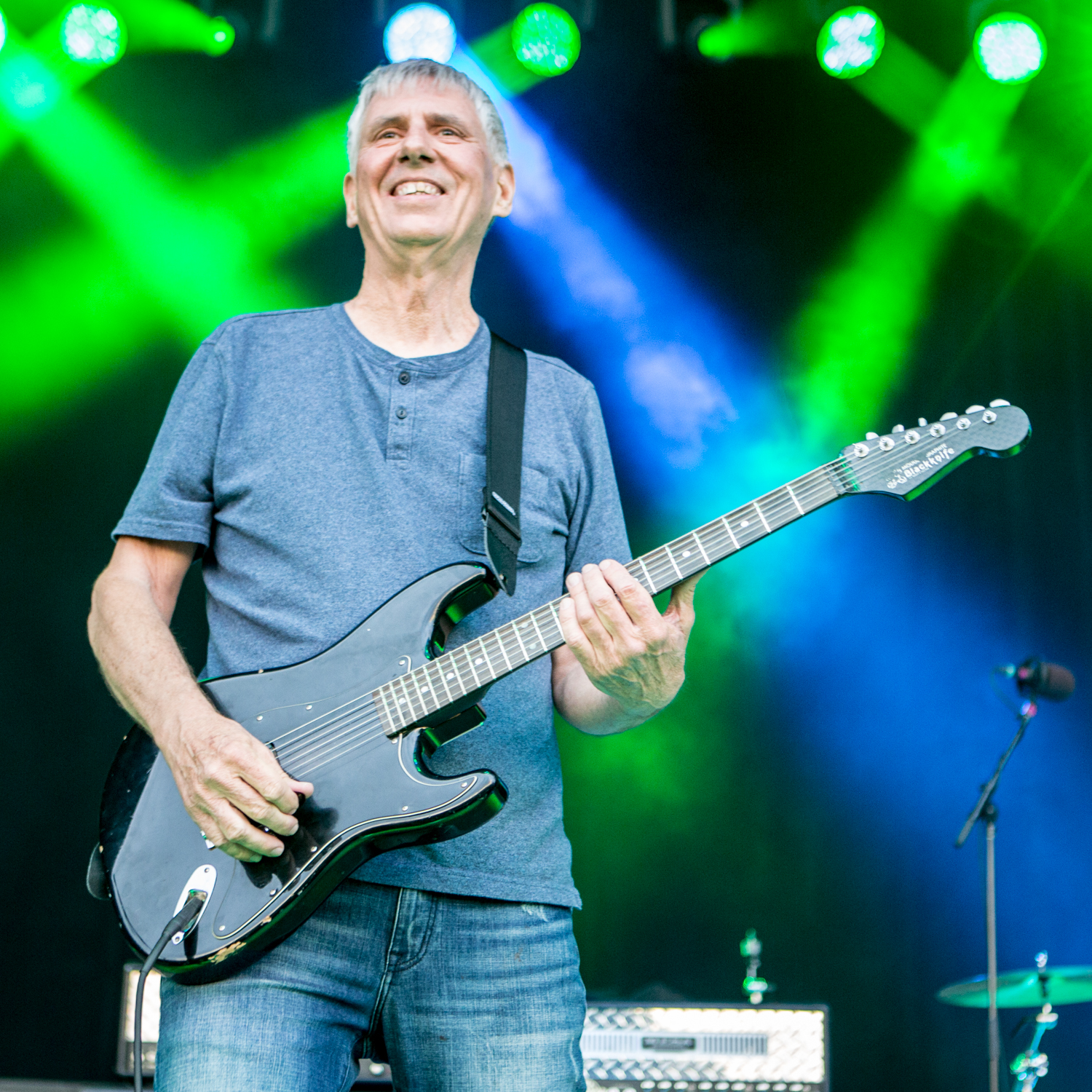
Greg Ginn in 2019

The song "TV Party" was recorded three times. To promote the Damaged album in the United States, Unicorn Records had Black Flag enter the studio and re-record the song for the EP in March 1982, with their then-new drummer Emil Johnson. The EP version features a slower tempo and hand claps. The band again recorded the song at the request of Alex Cox, for his 1984 cult classic film Repo Man and the accompanying soundtrack. Each version of the song lyrically references different TV shows from the era in which each recording was made.

== Style ==
"TV Party" is driven by Chuck Dukowski's bass line and features Henry Rollins on lead vocals and bellowed backing vocals from band members. The song is light in comparison to other songs from the band's Damaged era. Black Flag guitarist Greg Ginn has stated that after "Rollins joined the band, we couldn't do songs with a sense of humor anymore; he got into the serious way-out poet thing." Rollins described the song as satire, stating "it's about people who stay inside their house and live in a TV kinda world. And this has a very direct effect on us." Ginn echoed Rollins's interpretation, stating "It's basically a satire of people watching TV and partying at home, which is a sickness which is very prevalent in LA." Glen E. Friedman referred to the song as "a parody of certain type of people". Comparing the song to the Beastie Boys' "(You Gotta) Fight for Your Right (To Party!)", he stated "They were both parodies that people took too seriously, and even the bands were found taking themselves too seriously after the fact."

== Release ==
The TV Party EP was released in July 1982. To promote the EP, a music video of "TV Party" was shot featuring the members of Black Flag and their friends drinking beer and calling out their favorite television shows in front of a television set. Among the members is photographer (and the video's director) Glen E. Friedman. Target Video also released a home video titled TV Party, in 1983, containing live footage of the group from 1980 and 1982 as well as the video of the title track. There have been several variations on the release of the TV Party EP. They include one released by SST Records, one as a split between SST and Unicorn Records, and another simply by Unicorn. All three versions have the same track listing. Several different slip covers were also issued. A new version of the song "TV Party" later appeared on the soundtrack to the film Repo Man (1984). In the film, Emilio Estevez can be heard singing "TV Party". The song also appears on other compilation albums.

== Reception ==
The title song of the EP received praise from music critics. The website AllMusic gave a positive review of the song, describing it as "at once cutting and funny, an attack on television-inspired stasis that laughs both at and with its subjects" and "As a dumb anthem, it even beats out the band's cover of "Louie Louie". Spin referred to the song as the "greatest ode to the slacker sloth".

In 1982, Billboard listed the song "TV Party" as "Recommended" in their "Top Singles" review section. AllMusic gave the EP a retrospective rating of two and a half stars out of five, stating, "The other tracks are good, but this is a release for collectors or serious fans only."

== Track listing ==
All tracks are written by Greg Ginn

Side A
No.	Title	Length
1.	"TV Party"	3:52
Total length:		3:52

Side B
No.	Title	Length
1.	"I've Got to Run"	1:45
2.	"My Rules"	1:11
Total length:		2:56

== Personnel ==
Black Flag

- Henry Rollins – lead vocals
- Greg Ginn – lead guitar, composer
- Dez Cadena – rhythm guitar, vocals
- Chuck Dukowski – bass
- Emil Johnson – drums (side 1)
- Bill Stevenson – drums (side 2)

Production and design

- Ed Barton – producer
- Black Flag – producer
- Jeff Stebbins – engineer
- Glen E. Friedman – photography

== Charts ==
Chart (1982)	Peak position
UK Indie Chart	30

== Notes ==
- Popoff, Martin (2010). Goldmine Standard Catalog of American Records 1948–1991. Krause Publications. ISBN 978-1440216213.
- Chick, Stevie (2011). Spray Paint the Walls: The Story of Black Flag. PM Press. ISBN 978-1604865844.
- DeCurtis, Anthony, ed. (1992). The Rolling Stone Illustrated History of Rock and Roll: The Definitive History of the Most Important Artists and Their Music. Random House. ISBN 0679737286.
