= Everything Went Black =

Compilation album by Black Flag
- Released: 1982
- Recorded: January 1978 – April 1981
- Genre: Hardcore punk
- Length: 62:40
- Label: SST (015)
- Producer: Black Flag

Black Flag chronology
TV Party (1982)	Everything Went Black (1982)	The First Four Years (1983)

Alternative cover
- Original release with the band's name and logo covered up

Everything Went Black is a compilation album by the American hardcore punk band Black Flag. It was released in 1982 through SST Records. The compilation comprises early songs recorded before Henry Rollins became the band's vocalist in 1981, and was initially released without the group's name on its cover, due to their lawsuit with MCA/Unicorn. Instead, the names of the group members were listed on the first release.

== Background ==
After the release of their first EP, 1979's Nervous Breakdown, Black Flag began writing and recording material for a full-length album, but shelved the recordings when vocalist Keith Morris left the group. They returned to the studio to re-record much of the same material with second vocalist Ron Reyes, but only managed to secure five songs because of Reyes' habit of not showing up for recording sessions. These tracks saw release as the band's first 12" release, Jealous Again before Reyes eventually returned to the studio to lay down his remaining vocal tracks. Black Flag began the recording process again with their third vocalist Dez Cadena, but then shelved these takes when Henry Rollins joined the group as Black Flag's permanent singer for the band's 1980s tenure, re-recording the bulk of Black Flag's early canon for their first LP, 1981's Damaged.

At the height of the band's popularity following Damaged's release, Black Flag entered a state of legal limbo with MCA subsidiary Unicorn Records who would neither release any new Black Flag recordings, nor permit the band to issue their music themselves. Hence, they chose to compile the shelved recordings from their first three vocalists and release it as Everything Went Black with the band's name and logo blacked out on the album jacket. The songs filled up three LP sides, and the band collected a number of radio spots to comprise a fourth for a double-LP. After Unicorn Records folded and the band was able to once again release records under their own name, subsequent vinyl, cassette, and CD editions of Everything Went Black openly sported Black Flag's name and logo.

== Reception ==
Professional ratings
Review scores
Source	Rating
AllMusic	3/5 stars
Christgau's Record Guide	B

In a 1983 Trouser Press review, Ira Robbins noted that only "side three comes close" to matching their best work, describing the album as "a potent dose of unrestrained hardcore, and an edifying trip through the convoluted past of Black Flag."

== Track listing ==
All tracks are written by Greg Ginn, except where noted.

No.	Title	Writer(s)	Lead vocals	Length
1.	"Gimmie Gimmie Gimmie"		Johnny "Bob" Goldstein	1:57
2.	"I Don't Care"	Ginn, Keith Morris	Goldstein	0:58
3.	"White Minority"		Goldstein	1:09
4.	"No Values"		Goldstein	1:58
5.	"Revenge"		Goldstein	1:01
6.	"Depression"		Goldstein	2:07
7.	"Clocked In"		Goldstein	1:29
8.	"Police Story"		Goldstein	1:30
9.	"Wasted"	Ginn, Morris	Goldstein	0:42
10.	"Gimmie Gimmie Gimmie"		Chavo Pederast	1:40
11.	"Depression"		Pederast	2:40
12.	"Police Story"		Pederast	1:33
13.	"Clocked In"		Pederast	1:36
14.	"My Rules"		Pederast	0:58
15.	"Jealous Again"		Dez Cadena	2:24
16.	"Police Story"		Cadena	1:35
17.	"Damaged I"	Ginn, Cadena	Cadena	2:05
18.	"Louie Louie"	Richard Berry, Cadena (add. lyrics)	Cadena	1:27
19.	"No More"	Chuck Dukowski	Cadena	3:00
20.	"Room 13"	Ginn, Medea	Cadena	2:06
21.	"Depression"		Cadena	2:40
22.	"Damaged II"		Cadena	4:13
23.	"Padded Cell"	Dukowski, Ginn	Cadena	1:50
24.	"Gimmie Gimmie Gimmie"		Cadena	1:46
25.	"Crass Commercialism" (Two years of radio ads compiled by Harold & Howie Schvenkel)			17:34
Total length:				62:40

== Personnel ==
- Keith Morris (credited as "Johnny 'Bob' Goldstein") – lead vocals on tracks 1–9
- Ron Reyes (credited as "Chavo Pederast") – lead vocals on tracks 10–14
- Dez Cadena – lead vocals on tracks 15–24
- Greg Ginn – guitar
- Chuck Dukowski – bass
- Bryan Migdol – drums on tracks 1–4
- Robo – drums on tracks 5–24
