= Six Pack (EP) =

EP by Black Flag
- Released: June 1981
- Recorded: April 1981
- Studio: Golden Age Recording in Hollywood
- Genre: Hardcore punk
- Length: 5:26
- Label: SST (005)
- Producer: Geza X, Spot, Black Flag

Black Flag chronology
Jealous Again (1980)	Six Pack (1981)	Damaged (1981)

Professional ratings
Review scores
Source	Rating
AllMusic	4/5 stars

Six Pack is the third EP by the American hardcore punk band Black Flag. It was released in June 1981 through SST Records on 7" vinyl, and later on 10" and 12" vinyl in 1990. It was Black Flag’s first and only non-compilation release to feature the band’s third vocalist Dez Cadena before he switched to playing rhythm guitar.

== Track listing ==
Side A
No.	Title	Writer(s)	Length
1.	"Six Pack"	Greg Ginn	2:18

Side B
No.	Title	Writer(s)	Length
1.	"I've Heard It Before"	Chuck Dukowski, Ginn	1:38
2.	"American Waste"	Dukowski	1:30
Total length:			5:26

== Personnel ==
Adapted from the album liner notes.

=== Black Flag ===
- Dez Cadena – vocals
- Greg Ginn – guitar
- Chuck Dukowski – bass guitar
- Robo – drums

=== Production ===
- Geza X – producer, recording engineer, mix engineer
- Spot – producer
- Raymond Pettibon – artwork

== Charts ==
Chart (1982)	Peak position
UK Indie Chart	16
