= Nervous Breakdown (EP) =

EP by Black Flag
- Released: January 1979
- Recorded: January 1978
- Studio: Media Art (Hermosa Beach, California)
- Genre: Hardcore punk; punk rock
- Length: 5:13
- Label: SST
- Producer: Black Flag

Black Flag chronology
Nervous Breakdown (1979)	Jealous Again (1980)

Nervous Breakdown is the debut EP by the American hardcore punk band Black Flag, released in January 1979 by SST Records. It was the label's first release, and the only non-compilation release to feature Keith Morris on vocals.

The EP was a pivotal release in the development of the hardcore punk genre.

== Recording ==
The recording was financed by Greg Ginn with proceeds he had earned from his mail-order ham radio electronics business, Solid State Tuners (SST). Through Spot, then an apprentice engineer whom Ginn had already known from living in Hermosa Beach, California, the band found Media Art, a studio that had recently completed construction.

The recording was originally supposed to be released by Bomp! Records, but the band felt that the label was taking too long to put the record out. Eventually, the band took the master rights back, and Ginn put some more earnings from his ham radio business, located a pressing plant in the phone book, and co-founded SST Records with Black Flag bassist Chuck Dukowski, borrowing the label's name from his business.

It is commonly misconstrued that Spot was the producer and engineer of Nervous Breakdown. In his sleeve notes for the 1982 outtakes anthology Everything Went Black, Spot pointed out that as an apprentice engineer, his involvement in the sessions was limited to setting up microphones during the tracking sessions and doing rough mixes for the band to hear.

The initial pressing of Nervous Breakdown was 2,000 copies. Black Flag were able to use the record as "a badge of legitimacy" (according to Dukowski) to begin getting live gigs in the Los Angeles area.

Four other songs were completed during the recording: "Gimmie Gimmie Gimmie", "I Don't Care", "White Minority" and "No Values" which were later released as part of the Everything Went Black compilation album.

== Release history ==
The EP is still in print both in its original form (a 7" vinyl EP), as a 5" CD single, and as part of the anthology The First Four Years. It was also available at times as a 3" CD single, a 10" colored vinyl EP, and as part of the various artists compilation of SST singles, The 7 Inch Wonders of the World.

== Reception ==
Professional ratings
Review scores
Source	Rating
AllMusic	4/5 stars
Spin Alternative Record Guide	8/10

In Our Band Could Be Your Life, Michael Azerrad said, "It could well be their best recording; it was definitely the one by which everything after it would be measured. With music and lyrics by Ginn, the record is rude, scuzzy, and totally exhilarating. With his sardonic, Johnny Rottenesque delivery, Morris inflates the torment of teen angst into full-blown insanity."

== Track listing ==
All tracks are written by Greg Ginn, except where noted.

Side A
No.	Title	Length
1.	"Nervous Breakdown"	2:07

Side B
No.	Title	Writer(s)	Length
1.	"Fix Me"		0:55
2.	"I've Had It"		1:20
3.	"Wasted"	Keith Morris, Ginn	0:51
Total length:			5:13

== Personnel ==
Adapted from the album liner notes.

Black Flag

- Keith Morris – vocals
- Greg Ginn – guitars
- Gary McDaniel – bass
- Brian Migdol – drums

On the first pressings of the original 7", Black Flag's second drummer Robo is credited instead of Brian Migdol, despite not performing on the EP, as Migdol had left the group a few months before the EP's release.

Production

- Black Flag – production
- David Tarling – recording engineer
- Spot – recording engineer, mix engineer
- Raymond Pettibon – artwork
