= Ron Reyes =

American singer

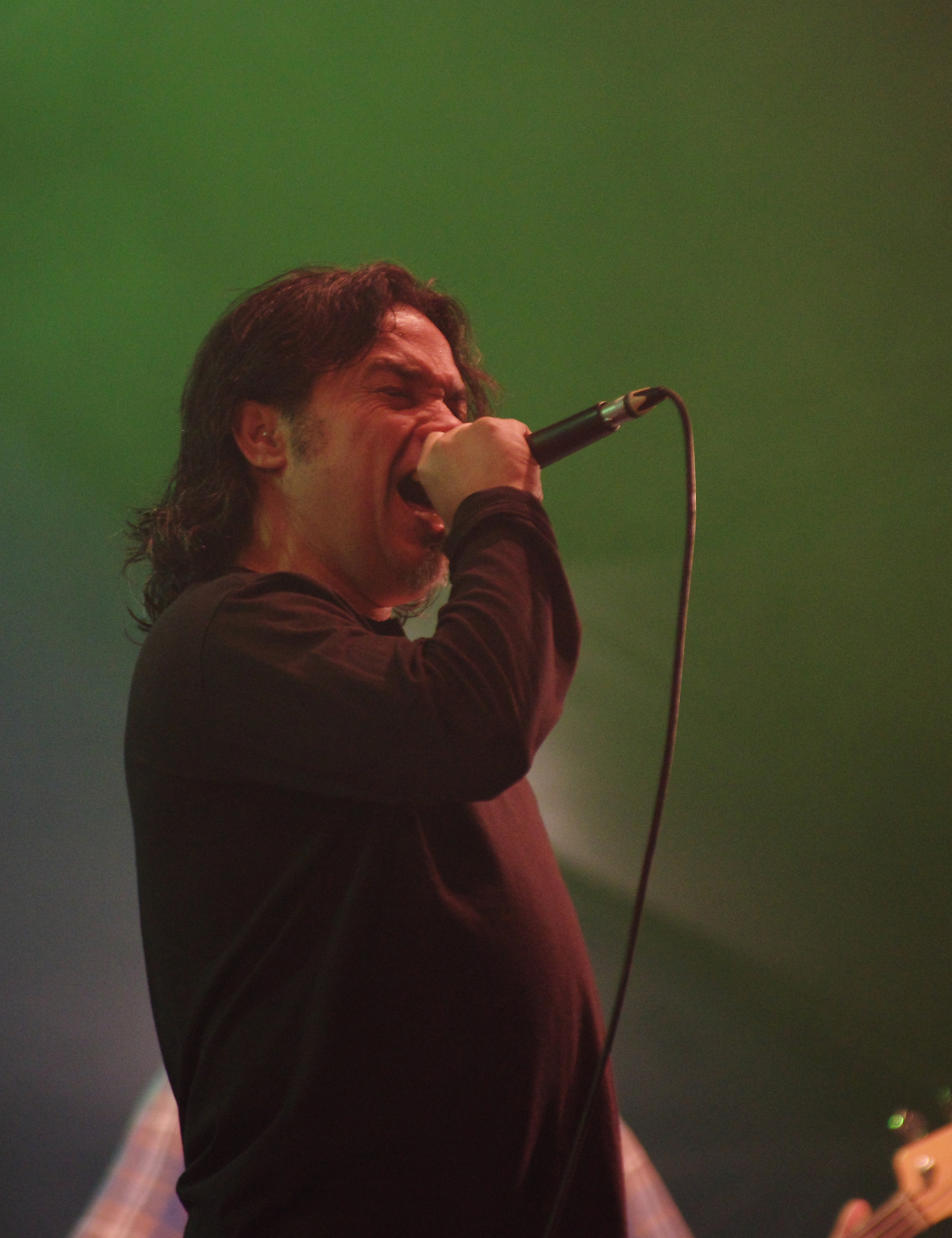
- Reyes performing with Black Flag in 2013

Background information
- Born: July 24, 1960 (age 66); Puerto Rico
- Genres: Punk rock, hardcore punk
- Occupation: Musician
- Instrument: Vocals
- Years active: 1980–present
- Label: SST

Ron Reyes (born July 24, 1960) is an American musician most noted as the second singer for the Los Angeles punk rock group Black Flag, which he fronted from 1979 to 1980 and again in 2013.

Reyes joined Black Flag after original vocalist Keith Morris had quit to form the Circle Jerks. Black Flag needed a singer to go on a tour to Vancouver, BC, Canada, and asked Reyes to fill in. Reyes is the singer on the Jealous Again EP, and is the vocalist in the film The Decline of Western Civilization. He left the band due to the violence at Black Flag shows. Thirty-three years after leaving the band, Reyes reunited with Black Flag in 2013 for an album, the band's first in 28 years, and tour followed that same year with Reyes being fired mid-show during a performance in Australia.

Reyes started his band Piggy in 2011. And also was the guest lead vocalist for Whidbey Island Washington's POTBELLY on a split 7-inch with Montana's Bath Salts Brigade in 2018. He performed only once with Potbelly.

== Early life ==
Ron Reyes was born in Puerto Rico and spent the first years of his life in the Bronx in New York City before moving to the Redondo Beach/Torrance area of southern California. His father owned a popular jazz shop in California, and Ron grew up listening to his father's record collection. As a boy, Ron would hang out in the streets and listen to Black Sabbath and David Bowie while his friends sniffed glue and smoked cannabis. He remembers himself as an outcast in school, where the jocks would make fun of his KISS-inspired glam rock fashion. He shared his first experiences at legendary Hollywood punk venues like RAJI'S with his high school friends in Hermosa Beach, spreading the news and unfurling the flag for new local bands to come.

== Black Flag ==
At the time of joining Black Flag, Reyes was a street kid who had been following them since the beginning, and already knew all the songs. He also played drums in an early incarnation of Redd Kross, along with Greg Hetson, who went on to form the Circle Jerks with Keith Morris, and subsequently joined Bad Religion. After touring with the band for less than a year, he left Black Flag in the middle of a show at the Fleetwood in Redondo Beach, due to his dissatisfaction with the rising violence in the punk scene.

Reyes was coaxed back into Black Flag long enough to record the Jealous Again EP. He also appeared on some selections included on the 1983 compilation album Everything Went Black. He can be seen in Penelope Spheeris' 1980 documentary The Decline of Western Civilization, in which he dedicates the song "Revenge" to the LAPD, and jokingly shows off his apartment, which is a closet. After the recording sessions, Reyes went back to Vancouver and was replaced by singer Dez Cadena.

The Jealous Again EP was released after Reyes had left the band for a final time. On the sleeve, he was credited as "Chavo Pederast", nonstandard Spanish for "Kid Pedophile". After his departure from Black Flag, Reyes relocated to Vancouver and formed the band Crash Bang Crunch Pop!.

Reyes rejoined Black Flag as vocalist for a 2013 tour and appeared on their subsequent album What The.... In November 2013, Reyes took to Facebook to inform fans that he was fired mid-show during a performance in Australia. Reyes said that his mic was taken and he was told to get off the stage by professional skateboarder and band manager Mike Vallely who also briefly fronted Black Flag in 2003. "You're done, party's over get off it's over..." He said something else to me but it was a lie so I won't repeat it here." Reyes said differences with Greg Ginn made him relieved that he was no longer with the band saying "So with a sense of great relief that it was finally over I left the stage and walked to the hotel room. They finished the set with Mike V on vocals. Yes it is my opinion that we fell very short indeed and the diminishing ticket sales and crowds are a testament to that. However It was made clear to me that raising these issues was tantamount to a blasphemous stab in the back to Greg".

In 2014, Reyes backed claims made by Greg Ginn's ex-wife that Ginn was abusive towards his 7 and 10 year old daughters and appeared in court on her behalf with Reyes claiming Ginn was on drugs around his daughters and would not properly feed them, often neglected them and that he is not capable of caring for children.

== Recent activity ==
Reyes performed live in Vancouver in celebration of his 50th birthday in July 2010. Joining him on the bill were The Jolts, The Modernettes, Little Guitar Army, and The Braineaters featuring artist Jim Cummins on lead vocals. Reyes' band consisted of guitarists Kevin Rose from Crash Bang Crunch Pop!, and Jon Doe from the Scramblers along with a rhythm section consisting of Real McKenzies founding member Anthony Walker on bass and Scott Beadle on drums. Greg Ginn performed three songs with the Ron Reyes Band at this event: "Jealous Again", "Revenge", and a new, original composition entitled "Broken".

Reyes appeared in the Vancouver-based documentary Bloodied but Unbowed about Vancouver's punk community in the late 1970s and The Other F Word about being a parent involved in the punk community. The film also says Reyes has worked at a Vancouver print shop for more than 20 years and has three teenagers. He is shown browsing records at a used record store in Vancouver with one of his daughters, and purchasing a copy of Jealous Again.

Reyes currently is performing as the guitarist for PIGGY. Other members of this new project include Izzy Gibson on lead vocals (currently drumming in The Hater Game, ex drummer of Living Deadbeats and AK-747s) Lisafurr Lloyd (ex Slickjacks; currently in the East Vamps) and on bass guitar; Craig McKimm (Little Guitar Army; The Fiends) on drums.

In 2016, Ron joined Dez Cadena to play shows in Brooklyn and Secaucus, NJ, under the name NORTH AMERICAN WASTE, playing a collection of material which included Black Flag songs, among other rock and roll classics. In 2017, Reyes played bass with Vancouver rock n' roll icons Puzzlehead for one show only.

Reyes appears as a guest vocalist on the 2020 album Fly Around by the bluegrass band Water Tower. He sings lead vocals on the last track on the album entitled "Anthem" together with the band's singer, Kenny Feinstein. A cartoon version of Reyes appears in the music video for "Anthem" alongside the band and drummer Don Bolles from the Germs. The video was shown at the Portland Film Festival.
