= Jealous Again =

EP by Black Flag
- Released: August 1980
- Recorded: November 1979 and April 1980
- Studio: Media Art, Hermosa Beach, California
- Genre: Hardcore punk
- Length: 6:30
- Label: SST (003)
- Producer: Spot, Black Flag

Black Flag chronology
Nervous Breakdown (1979)	Jealous Again (1980)	Six Pack (1981)

Jealous Again is the second EP by American hardcore punk band Black Flag, and the third-ever release on SST Records. It was Black Flag’s first and only non-compilation release to feature the band’s second vocalist Ron Reyes, as well as a diss track with bassist Chuck Dukowski on vocals.

== History ==
Although eventually released as a 12" 45 RPM extended-play, Jealous Again was initially intended to be Black Flag's first full-length album.

Spurred on by the reception to their first release, the EP Nervous Breakdown, Black Flag entered the studio in late 1979 with new drummer Robo and original singer Keith Morris to begin recording their first LP. Basic tracks for all of the songs were cut live in the studio with Morris singing temporary vocal parts. Almost without warning, however, according to bassist Chuck Dukowski, Morris "smashed his records and guitar and walked out screaming for a week," quitting the band and refusing to complete the album.

The band then recruited former Redd Kross member Ron Reyes, (credited on the record as "Chavo Pederast" after a falling out with the band) to be their new vocalist; however, guitarist and band leader Greg Ginn felt he was not yet ready to record, and the tapes were put aside for several months. After several shows with Reyes, one of which was filmed for the movie The Decline of Western Civilization, the sessions resumed, first with Ginn overdubbing new guitar parts and then Reyes doing his vocals. However, the initial attempts to record with Reyes proved fruitless when he started walking out of the vocal booth, and sometimes the studio entirely, in the middle of takes. Reyes later quit the band in the middle of a live performance, derailing the sessions entirely for a second time.

Ginn and Dukowski were already talking with another former Redd Kross member, Dez Cadena, about joining the band as a second guitarist; when Reyes quit the group, Cadena was invited to take his place. The band's producer/engineer Spot took an incentive and brought Cadena into the studio to record his own vocals for the album. Several tracks were done in one night with Cadena, but were shelved when Reyes agreed to complete the project. These new vocal sessions, according to Spot, went so smoothly that he could not resist jokingly asking Reyes, "Why didn't you quit the band before this?"

Ginn and Dukowski decided to release five tracks from the finished Reyes sessions as the 12" EP known to Black Flag fans today, and elected to make a second attempt at a debut album with Cadena as lead vocalist.

== Song history ==
Early versions of "Revenge" and "White Minority" with Reyes on vocals, along with an early version of the later Damaged track "Depression", were recorded and filmed for The Decline of Western Civilization. In the movie and on the soundtrack album, Reyes defiantly dedicates the former song to the LAPD. Already, Black Flag (and many other Los Angeles punk bands) were getting harassed by police; "Revenge" was undoubtedly inspired at least in part by the band's unprovoked encounters with them.

"You Bet We've Got Something Personal Against You!" initially started life as a Greg Ginn/Keith Morris composition, "I Don't Care", recorded during the original album sessions with Morris on vocals. When Morris quit the band, however, he took both "I Don't Care" and Nervous Breakdown's "Wasted" (the only other Morris/Ginn songwriting collaboration under the Black Flag moniker) with him and recorded them with his new band the Circle Jerks on their debut album Group Sex. Offended by what they saw as the misappropriation of two Black Flag songs, Dukowski wrote new lyrics to Ginn's music for "I Don't Care" and recorded what is essentially an attack on Morris and the Circle Jerks. "You Bet..." is also the only time Dukowski sings lead vocals on a Black Flag song.

== Existing outtakes ==
Outtakes from all three vocalist's attempts at recording for the EP, including Cadena's version of the title track, dominate the band's 1982 compilation double album Everything Went Black.

== Reissued variations ==
- The entire Jealous Again EP appeared on the singles compilation The First Four Years, but is also still available separately. It has also been reissued as a 3" CD and as a 10" vinyl EP.
- The initial CD version of Damaged, for reasons unknown, appended the Jealous Again EP to the CD as bonus tracks.

== Reception ==
Professional ratings
Review scores
Source	Rating
AllMusic	3.5/5 stars
Christgau's Record Guide	B

At the time of the EP’s release, The Village Voice‘s Robert Christgau wrote, "Black Flag are committed to rage, not in itself—I don't believe their 'I've got something personal against you' even though I know it's true—but as a musical principle. Five songs, seven minutes, as arty as no wave, with a comparable relationship to punk precedents, which for L.A. are basic Brit. The sound is extreme and unique, all forced rhythm and guitar blur with no ingratiating distractions—no humor, irony, hooks, or (God knows) melody. Well, maybe irony."

== Track listing ==
All tracks are written by Greg Ginn, except where noted.

Side A
No.	Title	Length
1.	"Jealous Again"	1:52
2.	"Revenge"	0:59

Side B
No.	Title	Writer(s)	Length
1.	"White Minority"		1:02
2.	"No Values"		1:45
3.	"You Bet We've Got Something Personal Against You!"	Chuck Dukowski, Ginn	0:52
Total length:			6:30

== Personnel ==
Adapted from the album liner notes.

Black Flag

- Ron Reyes (credited as "Chavo Pederast") – vocals
- Greg Ginn – guitars
- Chuck Dukowski – bass; vocals on "You Bet We've Got Something Personal Against You!"
- Robo – drums

Production

- Spot – producer, recording engineer, mix engineer
- Raymond Pettibon – artwork
