= SST Records discography =

The discography of SST Records, an American punk rock independent record label formed in Long Beach, California, and based for years in nearby Lawndale, ranges from releases in 1979 to the present. Founded by Black Flag guitarist Greg Ginn, the label released records by punk bands such as Black Flag, the Minutemen and Hüsker Dü during the 1980s.

== Discography ==
This list is organized by catalog number, a roughly chronological number system established by the label and typically printed on or assigned to each official release.

Year	No.	Artist	Title
1979	001	Black Flag	Nervous Breakdown
1980	002	Minutemen	Paranoid Time
1980	003	Black Flag	Jealous Again
1981	004	Minutemen	The Punch Line
1981	005	Black Flag	Six Pack
1981	006	Saccharine Trust	Paganicons
1981	007	Black Flag	Damaged
1982	008	Overkill	Hell's Getting Hotter
1982	009	Meat Puppets	Meat Puppets
1982	010	Stains	Stains
1982	011	Würm	I'm Dead
1982	012	Black Flag	TV Party
1983	013	Various Artists	The Blasting Concept
1983	014	Minutemen	What Makes a Man Start Fires?
1983	015	Black Flag	Everything Went Black
1983	016	Minutemen	Buzz or Howl Under the Influence of Heat
1983	017	The Dicks	Kill from the Heart
1983	018	Subhumans	No Wishes, No Prayers
1984	019	Meat Puppets	Meat Puppets II
1983	020	Hüsker Dü	Metal Circus
1983	021	Black Flag	The First Four Years
1984	022	Saint Vitus	Saint Vitus
1984	023	Black Flag	My War
1984	024	Saccharine Trust	Surviving You, Always
1984	025	Hüsker Dü	"Eight Miles High"
1984	026	Black Flag	Family Man
1984	027	Hüsker Dü	Zen Arcade
1984	028	Minutemen	Double Nickels on the Dime
1984	029	Black Flag	Slip It In
1984	030	Black Flag	Live '84
1985	031	Hüsker Dü	New Day Rising
1985	032	Minutemen	My First Bells
1985	033	DC3	This Is the Dream
1985	034	Minutemen	Project: Mersh
1985	035	Black Flag	Loose Nut
1985	036	October Faction	October Faction
1985	037	Black Flag	The Process of Weeding Out
1985	038	Overkill	Triumph of the Will
1985	039	Meat Puppets	Up on the Sun
1986	040	Das Damen	Das Damen
1985	041	Würm	Feast
1985	042	Saint Vitus	The Walking Dead
1985	043	Various Artists	The Blasting Concept Volume II
1985	044	Meat Puppets	In a Car
1985	045	Black Flag	In My Head
1985	046	Saccharine Trust	Worldbroken
1985	047	Tom Troccoli's Dog	Tom Troccoli's Dog
1986	048	Saccharine Trust	We Became Snakes
1986	049	Meat Puppets	Out My Way
1986	050	Minuteflag	Minuteflag
1985	051	Hüsker Dü	"Makes No Sense at All"
1985	052	Saint Vitus	Hallow's Victim
1985	053	SWA	Your Future, If You Have One
1985	054	Angst	Lite Life
1985	055	Hüsker Dü	Flip Your Wig
1986	056	October Faction	Second Factionalization
1985	057	Painted Willie	Mind Bowling
1985	058	Minutemen	3-Way Tie (For Last)
1986	059	Sonic Youth	EVOL
1986	060	Black Flag	Who's Got the 10½?
1986	061	Gone	Let's Get Gone, Real Gone for a Change
1986	062	Various Artists	Lovedolls Superstar
1986	063	DC3	The Good Hex
1986	064	Angst	Angst
1986	065	Bad Brains	I Against I
1986	066	Various Artists	Program: Annihilator
1986	067	Slovenly	Thinking of Empire
1986	068	Minutemen	Ballot Result
1988	069	Various Artists	Chunks
1985	070	Various Artists	The 7 Inch Wonders of the World
1986	071	The Leaving Trains	Kill Tunes
1986	072	Various Artists	Desperate Teenage Lovedolls
1986	073	SWA	Sex Doctor
1986	074	Angst	Mending Wall
1986	075	Alter Natives	Hold Your Tongue
1987	076	Paper Bag	Ticket to Trauma
1986	077	Zoogz Rift	Island of Living Puke
1986	078	Always August	Black Pyramid
1986	079	Firehose	Ragin', Full On
1986	080	Sonic Youth	"Starpower"
1987	081	Black Flag	Annihilate This Week
1987	082	Saint Vitus	Born Too Late
1986	083	DC3	You're Only As Blind As Your Mind Can Be
1986	084	Saccharine Trust	The Sacramental Element
1986	085	Painted Willie	Live from Van Nuys
1986	086	Gone	Gone II - But Never Too Gone!
1986	087	Lawndale	Beyond Barbeque
1986	088	Zoogz Rift	Looser Than Clams... A Historical Retrospective
1987	089	Slovenly	Riposte
1986	090	Divine Horsemen	Middle of the Night
1986	091	Divine Horsemen	Devil's River
1988	092	Various Artists	Cracks in the Sidewalk
1987	093	SWA	XCIII
1987	094	The Flesh Eaters	Destroyed By Fire
1987	095	Das Damen	Jupiter Eye
1987	096	Sonic Youth	Confusion Is Sex
1987	097	Sonic Youth	Sonic Youth
1987	098	Painted Willie	Upsidedowntown
1987	099	Zoogz Rift	Water
1987	100	Meat Puppets	Mirage
1987	101	Tar Babies	Fried Milk
1987	102	Various Artists	No Age: A Compilation of SST Instrumental Music
1987	103	Opal	Happy Nightmare Baby
1987	104	Blind Idiot God	Blind Idiot God
1988	105	Screaming Trees	Other Worlds
1987	106	Bl'ast	It's in My Blood!
1987	107	Painted Willie	My Fellow Americans (unreleased)
1987	108	Painted Willie	Painted Willie (unreleased)
1987	109	Joe Baiza & the Universal Congress Of	Joe Baiza & The Universal Congress Of
1987	110	Henry Kaiser & Crazy Backwards Alphabet	Crazy Backwards Alphabet
1987	111	Angst	Mystery Spot
1987	112	Descendents	ALL
1987	113	Lee Ranaldo	From Here to Infinity
1987	114	The Leaving Trains	Fuck
1987	115	Firehose	If'n
1987	116	Blood on the Saddle	Fresh Blood
1987	117	H.R.	Human Rights
1987	118	Henry Kaiser	Devil in the Drain
1987	119	Saint Vitus	Thirsty and Miserable
1987	120	Zoogz Rift	Ipecac
1987	121	Zoogz Rift	Interim Resurgence
1987	122	Zoogz Rift	Amputees in Limbo
1987	123	Zoogz Rift	Idiots on the Miniature Golf Course
1987	124	Bl'ast	"School's Out"
1987	125	Lawndale	Sasquatch Rock
1987	126	Treacherous Jaywalkers	Sunrise
1988	127	Cruel Frederick	The Birth of the Cruel
1987	128	Elliott Sharp	In the Land of the Yahoos
1987	129	Elliott Sharp & the Soldier String Quartet	Tessalation Row
1987	130	Dinosaur Jr.	You're Living All Over Me
1988	131	Firehose	Sometimes
1987	132	Screaming Trees	Even If and Especially When
1987	133	Negativland	Escape from Noise
1987	134	Sonic Youth	Sister
1987	135	Always August	Largeness with (W)holes
1987	136	Glenn Phillips	Elevator
1987	137	Zoogz Rift	Water II: At Safe Distance
1987	138	Minutemen	Post-Mersh Vol. 1
1987	139	Minutemen	Post-Mersh Vol. 2
1987	140	Divine Horsemen	Snake Handler
1987	141	Brian Ritchie	The Blend
1988	142	Descendents	Milo Goes to College
1988	143	Descendents	I Don't Want to Grow Up
1988	144	Descendents	Bonus Fat
1988	145	Descendents	Two Things at Once
1988	146	Sylvia Juncosa	Nature
1987	147	Fred Frith & Henry Kaiser	With Enemies Like These, Who Needs Friends?
1987	148	Bl'ast	The Power of Expression
1989	149	Saccharine Trust	Past Lives
1987	150	Meat Puppets	Huevos
1987	151	Scott Colby	Slide of Hand
1987	152	Dinosaur Jr.	"Little Fury Things"
1988	153	SWA	"Arroyo"
1988	154	Pat Smear	Ruthensmear
1988	155	Sonic Youth	Master-Dik
1989	156	DC3	Vida
1988	157	SWA	Evolution 1985-1987
1987	158	Pell Mell	The Bumper Crop
1987	159	Steve Fisk	448 Deathless Days
1988	160	Bad Brains	Live
1988	161	Saint Vitus	Mournful Cries
1988	162	Sister Double Happiness	Sister Double Happiness
1988	163	Descendents	Liveage
1987	164	These Immortal Souls	Get Lost (Don't Lie!)
1989	165	Minutemen	Post-Mersh Vol. 3
1987	166	Black Flag	Wasted...Again
1987	167	Semantics	Bone of Contention
1988	168	Ras Michael	Zion Train
1988	169	Tar Babies	No Contest
1987	170	Paper Bag	A Land Without Fences
1987	171	H.R.	The HR Tapes
1988	172	Fred Frith	The Technology of Tears
1988	173	H.R.	Now You Say
1987	174	Zoogz Rift	Son of Puke
1987	175	Black Flag	"Louie Louie"
1988	176	Divine Horsemen	Handful of Sand
1987	177	H.R.	Keep Out of Reach
1988	178	Painted Willie	Relics
1988	179	H.R.	It's About Luv
1988	180	Universal Congress Of	Prosperous and Qualified
1988	181	Sonic Youth	Sonic Death
1988	182	Everett Shock	Ghost Boys
1987	183	These Immortal Souls	"Marry Me (Lie! Lie!)"
1988	184	Zoogz Rift	Nonentity (Water III: Fan Black Dada)
1988	185	Alter Natives	Group Therapy
1988	186	Brian Ritchie	Nuclear War
1988	187	Brian Ritchie	Atomkrieg
1988	188	Screaming Trees	Invisible Lantern
1988	189	The Last	Confession
1988	190	Das Damen	Triskaidekaphobe
1988	191	Mofungo	Bugged
1988	192	Run Westy Run	Hardly, Not Even
1988	193	Always August	Geography
1988	194	Elliott Sharp/Carbon	Larynx
1987	195	Hüsker Dü	Land Speed Record
1988	196	Paul Roessler	Abominable
1988	197	Trotsky Icepick	Baby
1988	198	Henry Kaiser	Those Who Know History Are Doomed to Repeat It
1988	199	Run Westy Run	Run Westy Run
1988	200	Paper Bag	Music to Trash
1988	201	Soundgarden	Ultramega OK
1988	202	Brian Ritchie	Sonic Temple and Court of Babylon
1988	203	Roger Manning	Roger Manning
1988	204	Universal Congress Of	This Is Mecolodics
1988	205	Descendents	Hallraker: Live!
1988	206	Angst	Cry for Happy
1988	207	Treacherous Jaywalkers	Good Medicine
1989	208	Elliott Sharp/Carbon	Monster Curve
1989	209	Slovenly	We Shoot for the Moon
1988	210	Volcano Suns	Farced
1989	211	Zoogz Rift	Murdering Hell's Happy Cretins
1989	212	Descendents	Fat
1989	213	Various Artists	Program: Annihilator II
1989	214	Minutemen	Joy
1989	215	Grant Hart	Intolerance
1988	216	Dinosaur Jr.	Bug
1989	217	Treacherous Jaywalkers	La Isla Bonita
1988	218	Das Damen	Marshmellow Conspiracy
1988	219	Grant Hart	2541
1988	220	Dinosaur Jr.	"Freak Scene"
1989	221	The Leaving Trains	Transportational D. Vices
1988	222	Henry Kaiser	Re-Marrying for Money
1988	223	Kirk Kelly	Go Man Go
1989	224	H.R.	Singin' in the Heart
1989	225	Bl'ast	Take the Manic Ride
1989	226	Black Flag	I Can See You
1988	227	Brian Ritchie	Sun Ra-Man from Outer Space
1991	228	Bad Brains	Spirit Electricity
1989	229	Paper Bag	Improvised ... My Ass
1989	230	The Last	Awakening
1989	231	Soundgarden	"Flower"
1989	232	Elliott Sharp/Soldier String Quartet	Hammer, Anvil, Stirrup
1989	233	Negativland	Jam Con '84
1989	234	Sonic Youth/Revolution 409/Project Jenny/Das Damen	Mini Plot
1989	235	Firehose	Fromohio
1989	236	Tar Babies	Honey Bubble
1989	237	Henry Kaiser	Alternate Versions
1989	238	SWA	Winter
1989	239	Trotsky Icepick	Poison Summer
1989	240	Mofungo	Work
1990	241	Pell Mell	Rhyming Guitars
1989	242	Descendents	Enjoy!
1989	243	No Man Is Roger Miller	Win! Instantly!
1989	244	Dinosaur Jr.	"Just Like Heaven"
1989	245	The Alter Natives	Buzz
1989	246	Trotsky Icepick	El Kabong
1989	247	Stone by Stone w/ Chris D.	I Pass for Human
1989	248	Screaming Trees	Buzz Factory
1989	249	Various Artists	The Melting Plot
1989	250	Buffalo Tom	Buffalo Tom
1989	251	Zoogz Rift	Torment
1989	252	Negativland	Helter Stupid
1989	253	Meat Puppets	Monsters
1989	254	Trotsky Icepick	Danny & The Doorknobs
1991	255	Opal	"Rocket Machine" (unreleased)
1990	256	H.R.	Charge
1989	257	Volcano Suns	Thing of Beauty
Unknown	258	-	
1991	259	Descendents	Somery
1991	260	Screaming Trees	Anthology: SST Years 1985–1989
Unknown	261	-	
1990	262	Grant Hart	All of My Senses
1990	263	Various Artists	Duck and Cover
1990	264	The Flesh Eaters	Prehistoric Fits
1990	265	Meat Puppets	No Strings Attached
1991	266	Saint Vitus	Heavier Than Thou
1990	267	No Man	Whamon Express
Unknown	268	-	
Unknown	269	-	
1990	270	Hüsker Dü	"Eight Miles High/Makes No Sense at All"
1990	271	The Leaving Trains	Sleeping Underwater Survivors
1991	272	Negativland	U2
1991	273	The Flesh Eaters	Dragstrip Riot
1992	274	H.R.	Rock of Enoch
1991	275	Dinosaur Jr.	Fossils
1991	276	Various Artists	SST Acoustic
1991	277	Minutemen	The Politics of Time
1991	278	Pell Mell	Flow
1991	279	Trotsky Icepick	The Ultraviolet Catastrophe
Unknown	280	-	
1991	281	No Man	How the West Was Won
1991	282	SWA	Volume
1991	283	The Leaving Trains	"Rock 'n' Roll Murder"
1991	284	The Leaving Trains	Loser Illusion Pt. 0
Unknown	285	-	
1994	286	Trotsky Icepick	Hot Pop Hello
1992	287	Slovenly	Highway to Hanno's
1992	288	The Leaving Trains	The Lump in My Forehead
Unknown	289	-	
1991	290	Cruel Frederick	We Are the Music We Play
1992	291	Negativland	Guns
1992	292	The Flesh Eaters	Sex Diary of Mr. Vampire
1994	293	The Leaving Trains	The Big Jinx
1992	294	Pat Smear	So You Fell in Love with a Musician...
1993	295	Trotsky Icepick	Carpetbomb the Riff
1993	296	Bazooka	Perfectly Square
1993	297	The Flesh Eaters	Crucified Lovers in Woman Hell
1993	298	Hotel X	A Random History of the Avante-Groove
1993	299	Poindexter Stewart	College Rock
1994	300	Gone	The Criminal Mind
1994	301	Hotel X	Residential Suite
1994	302	Transition	Spine
1994	303	Gone	Smoking Gun
1994	304	Hotel X	Engendered Species
1995	305	Confront James	Test One Reality
1994	306	Gone	All the Dirt That's Fit to Print
1994	307	Roger Miller's Exquisite Corpse	Unfold
1994	308	Bazooka	Blowhole
1995	309	Confront James	Just Do It
1995	310	The Muddle	The Muddle
1995	311	The Leaving Trains	Drowned and Dragged
Unknown	312	-	
1996	313	Gone	Best Left Unsaid
1996	314	Confront James	Ill Gotten Hatred
1995	315	The Sort of Quartet	Planet Mamon
1995	316	Hor	House
1995	317	Hotel X	Ladders
1995	318	Roger Miller	Elemental Guitar
1995	319	Gone	Damage Control
1995	320	Mojack	Merchandising Murder
1995	321	Fatso Jetson	Stinky Little Gods
1996	322	Confront James	Chemical Exposure
1996	323	The Last	Gin & Innuendoes
1995	324	Screw Radio	Talk Radio Violence
1996	325	Bazooka	Cigars, Oysters & Booze
1996	326	Hor	Slo 'n' Sleazy
Unknown	327	-	
1995	328	Hotel X	Uncommon Grounds
1996	329	The Sort of Quartet	Kiss Me Twice, I'm Schitzo
1996	330	El Bad	Bad Motherfucker
1996	331	Roger Miller	The Benevolent Disruptive Ray
1996	332	The Sort of Quartet	Bombas De Amor
1996	333	Screw Radio	I'm a Generation X...
1997	334	The Leaving Trains	Favorite Mood Swings
1996	335	Brother Weasel	Brother Weasel
1997	336	Bazooka	Poor Mr. Rock Star
1996	337	Hotel X	Routes Music
1996	338	The Leaving Trains	Smoke Follows Beauty
Unknown	339	-	
1997	340	Oxbow	Serenade in Red
1998	341	Fatso Jetson	Power of Three
1998	342	Screw Radio	Best of Screw Radio
1997	343	Confront James	Black Bomb Mountain
1998	344	Gone	Country Dumb
1997	345	The Killer Tweeker Bees	Tweeker Blues
Unknown	346	-	
1998	347	Hor	A Faster, More Aggressive Hor
1997	348	El Bad	Trick or Treat
1997	349	The Binary System	Live at the Idea Room
Unknown	350	-	
Unknown	351	-	
1997	352	Bias	Model Citizen
1997	353	Get Me High	Taming the Underground
Unknown	354	-	
1997	355	Negativland	Negativ(e)land: Live on Tour
1997	356	Bazooka	Sonic Business Environment
1997	357	Guns, Books & Tools	Guns, Books & Tools
Unknown	358	-	
1997	359	Mojack	Home Brew
Unknown	360	-	
1998	361	H.R.	Anthology
Unknown	362	-	
1998	363	Minutemen	Introducing the Minutemen
Unknown	364	-	
1998	365	Brother Weasel	Swingin' and Groovin'
2003	366	Hor	Bash (unreleased)
2003	367	Mojack	Rub a Dub (unreleased)
2003	368	Fastgato	Feral (unreleased)
Unknown	369	-	
2003	370	Confront James	We Are Humored (unreleased)
2003	371	Limey LBC	Life of Lime (unreleased)
2007	372	Mojack	Under the Willow Tree
2007	373	Greg Ginn & the Taylor Texas Corrugators	Bent Edge
2007	374	Gone	Epic Trilogy
2008	375	Jambang	Connecting
2008	376	Mojack	The Metal Years
2008	377	Greg Ginn & the Taylor Texas Corrugators	Goof Off Experts
2010	378	Saint Vitus	Hallow's Victim/The Walking Dead
2010	379	Jambang	200 Days in Space
2010	380	Greg Ginn & the Taylor Texas Corrugators	Legends of Williamson County
2010	381	Hor	Culture Wars
2011	382	Mojack	Hijinks
2011	383	Greg Ginn and the Royal We	We Are Amused
2011	384	Greg Ginn and the Royal We	We Are One
2013	385	Good for You	Life Is Too Short Not to Hold a Grudge
2013	386	Greg Ginn and the Royal We	Fearless Leaders
2013	387	Mojack	Car
2013	388	Good for You	Fucked Up
2013	389	Good for You	Too!
2013	390	Good for You	Full Serving
2013	391	Black Flag	What The...
2014	392	Greg Ginn & the Taylor Texas Corrugators	Gumbo and Holy Water
2014	393	Hor	Can't Make It Up

== See also ==
- List of SST Records bands
