= List of SST Records bands =

This list of SST Records bands includes several artists who have released music through the California independent record label SST Records.

== Artists ==
Artist	Years active while on the label	Records released	Comments
Black Flag	1979–1986	Nervous Breakdown (1979), Jealous Again (1980), Six Pack, Damaged, Family Man (1984) Slip It In (1984) ...	Band of SST Records founder Greg Ginn.
Tar Babies	1987–1989	Fried Milk (1987), No Contest (1988), Honey Bubble (1989)	Madison, Wisconsin band formed in 1982. The original line up was Bucky Pope (guitar), Jeremy Davies (vocals), Robin Davies (bass), and Dan Bitney (drums).
Slovenly	1986–1992	Thinking of Empire (1986), Riposte (1987), We Shoot for the Moon (1989), Highway to Hanno's (1992)	San Francisco, California post-punk band formed in 1981. After the group disbanded, Tom Watson joined Red Krayola for their self-titled album and has continued to record with them.
Meat Puppets	1982–1989	In a Car EP (1981), Meat Puppets (1982), Meat Puppets II (1984), Up on the Sun (1985), Out My Way EP (1986), Mirage (1987), Huevos (1987), Monsters (1989), No Strings Attached compilation (1990)	Moved to London Records after leaving SST. Later sued SST for unpaid royalties and reissued their back catalogue through Rykodisc.
The Dicks	1983	Kill from the Heart (1983)	The Dicks were active from 1980 until 1986 but recorded only one LP for SST. They released a second LP on Alternative Tentacles in 1985.
Dinosaur Jr	1987–1991	Little Fury Things (1987), You're Living All Over Me (1987), Freak Scene (1988), Bug (1988), Just Like Heaven (1989), Fossils (1991)	Dinosaur Jr left SST for Sire Records after 1989. You're Living All Over Me and Bug were reissued by Merge Records in 2005.
DC3	1985–1987	This Is The Dream (1985), The Good Hex (1986), You're Only As Blind As Your Mind Can Be (1986), Vida (1989)	Retro/hard rock band (a trio for the first LP, quartet the rest of the time) led by Dez Cadena, formed in 1983 following his departure from Black Flag. SST released a collection of live tracks posthumously in 1989.
Descendents	1987	All (1987), Liveage (1987), Bonus Fat [reissue] (1987), Milo Goes To College [reissue] (1987), I Don't Want To Grow Up [reissue] (1987), Two Things at Once [reissue] (1988), Hallraker (1989), Enjoy! (1989) [reissue], Somery (retrospective) (1991)	The Descendents signed with SST in 1987 for what was supposed to be their final LP. Their back catalogue was reissued by SST after the label purchased New Alliance Records, the Descendents' previous home. The group reunited in 1996 and recorded for Epitaph Records, and again in 2002 for Fat Wreck Chords.
Lee Ranaldo	1987	From Here to Infinity	Debut album.
Minutemen	1980–1985	Paranoid Time EP (1980), Joy EP [reissue] (1981), The Punch Line (1981), What Makes a Man Start Fires? (1983), Buzz or Howl Under the Influence of Heat EP (1983), Double Nickels on the Dime (1984), Tour-Spiel EP (1985), Project: Mersh EP (1985), 3-Way Tie (For Last) (1985), Ballot Result live album (1986)	The Minutemen were the second band to sign to the label.
Overkill	1981–1983	Hell's Getting Hotter (1981), Triumph Of The Will (1985)	Last album was released posthumously. Re-christened "Overkill L.A." after their break-up to avoid confusion with New Jersey's Overkill
Saccharine Trust	1981–1986	Paganicons (1981), Surviving You, Always (1984), Worldbroken (1985), We Became Snakes (1986), Past Lives (live retrospective) (1989)	The third band ever signed to SST, they recorded with the label throughout the decade before breaking up in 1987. Reunited in the late 1990s but did not return to SST.
Saint Vitus	1984–1988	Saint Vitus (1984), The Walking Dead (1985), Hallow's Victim (1985), Thirsty and Miserable (1987), Born Too Late (1986), Mournful Cries (1988), Heavier Than Thou (retrospective) (1991), The Walking Dead/Hallow's Victim (compilation) (2010)	One of the forefathers of the doom metal movement, the band was said to be a personal favorite of many of the SST folks (SST label manager/co-owner Joe Carducci co-produced all their SST albums), they were the first heavy metal band to record for SST. Moved to the German label Hellhound Records in 1989 and stayed with the label until their split in 1995. The band reunited in 2008. In 2010, SST repressed the band's back catalog on CD and (except for the 1st album) vinyl. This included the first time that the band's 1985 EP, The Walking Dead and 2nd LP, Hallow's Victim, were officially released on compact disc.
The Stains	1981–1983 (?)	The Stains (1983)	The band's one record was recorded in 1981 but not released until 1983. The band broke up around the same time.
Subhumans	1983	No Wishes, No Prayers (1983)	The Subhumans (from Canada, not the British band), formed in 1978 and recorded one LP (their second full-length overall) for SST but split around the same time as its release when singer Wimpy Roy left to join D.O.A. Because of the break-up, SST never did a second pressing of the LP. The band reunited in 2005 and now records for Alternative Tentacles.
SWA	1985–1991	Your Future (If You Have One) (1985), Sex Doctor (1986), XCIII (1987), Evolution: 1985–1987 (1988), Winter (1989), Volume (1991)	SWA was formed by Chuck Dukowski (ex-Black Flag) bassist and SST co-founder.
Sylvia Juncosa	1986–1987	Nature (1987)	Guitarist Sylvia Juncosa played with SWA before starting a solo career in 1987.
Lawndale	1984–1988, 2006–Present	Beyond Barbeque (1986), Sasquatch Rock (1987)	Formed in 1984, the all-instrumental psychedelic surf band played many shows with various SST acts, and signed with the label in 1986. Lawndale recorded two albums at Radio Tokyo, and has tracks on a few compilations, including Lovedolls Superstar and No Age: A Compilation Of SST Instrumental Music.
The Leaving Trains	1986–1996	Kill Tunes (1986), Fuck (1987), Transportional D. Vices (1989), Sleeping Underwater Survivors (1989),Duck & Cover (1990), Loser Illusion Part 0(1991), The Lump in My Forehead (1992).	
Würm	1982, 1983	I'm Dead (1982), Feast (1985)	Würm was Chuck Dukowski's 1970s pre-Black Flag outfit. He re-grouped the band in 1982 to record a single and play some shows. The band re-grouped again in 1983 with a new singer (previously, Dukowski and guitarist Ed Danky shared vocals) to record an LP. The group dissolved after the recording and the LP was not released until 1985.
October Faction	1985–1986	October Faction (1985), Second Factionalization (1986)	Jam band featuring Greg Ginn, Joe Baiza, Chuck Dukowski and others.
The Last	1988–1996	Confession (1988), Awakenings (1989), Gin & Innuendos (1996)	The Last were part of the late '70s–early '80s pop revival in Los Angeles and had connections to the early days of the Descendents. Although they split in 1985, the band regrouped reunited in 1988 to record for SST. According to the band, because no one was really keeping the accounting for studio time in check, Awakenings was the most expensive record ever produced by SST and the resulting lack of sales led to a number of severe cutbacks at the label that damaged the resulting tour for the album . The Gin & Innuendos album was ready for release in 1994, but due what the band calls a "strange contract renegotiation phase" with SST, the release was delayed until 1996.
Hüsker Dü	1983–1985	Metal Circus (1983), Zen Arcade (1984), New Day Rising (1985), Flip Your Wig (1986), Land Speed Record [reissue] (1987)	Minneapolis-based trio who were the first band to leave SST for major label contract, signing with Warner Bros. in 1986.
Soundgarden	1988	Ultramega OK (1988), Flower (1989)	Briefly signed and left to sign a major label deal with A&M.
Sonic Youth	1986–1987	Starpower (1986), EVOL (1986), Sister (1987), Confusion is Sex [reissue] (1987), Sonic Youth [reissue] (1987), Sonic Death [reissue] (1988)	Dissatisfied with SST's business practices, Sonic Youth left SST in 1988, a split they described as "very unamicable". The group eventually resorted to legal means to pull their back catalog from SST.
Opal	1987	Happy Nightmare Baby	The band split on tour in 1987. Guitarist David Roback went on to form Mazzy Star.
Tom Troccoli's Dog	1986	Tom Troccoli's Dog	Tom Troccoli was a Black Flag roadie and merchandise guy who also played with October Faction. Greg Ginn played bass on the one Tom Troccoli's Dog LP.
Angst	1985–1988	Lite Life (1985), Mending Wall (1986), Angst [reissue] (1986), Mystery Spot (1987), Cry For Happy (1988)	This San Francisco-based trio, led by brothers Joseph Pope and Jon E. Risk (both natives of Denver, Colorado), recorded four LPs for SST between 1985 and 1988, the last of which would be the only Angst album to be released on CD. The label also reissued the band's first EP in 1986.
Fatso Jetson	1994–1997	Stinky Little Gods (1995), Power Of Three (1997)	"Desert Rock" band from CA who were signed to SST after their first show, where they opened for Greg Ginn. They left the label after 1997 as SST was unable to put out their next record (SST was about to enter a decade-long period of inactivity). They are still active today
Gone	1985–1986, 1994–present	Let's Get Gone, Real Gone for a Change (1986), Gone II But Never Too Gone (1986), Criminal Mind (1994), All The Dirt That's Fit to Print (1994), Best Left Unsaid (1996), Country Dumb (1998), The Epic Trilogy (2007)	Instrumental trio formed by Greg Ginn in 1985. He retired the group in 1986 to concentrate on running SST and the rhythm section joined the Rollins Band. Ginn resurrected the group in 1994 with a new rhythm section and they remain an ongoing concern, despite a 9-year gap between their most recent releases.
fIREHOSE	1986–1989	Ragin', Full On (1986), If'n (1987), Sometimes, Almost Always EP (1988), Fromohio (1989)	Formed by former Minutemen members Mike Watt and George Hurley and Minutemen fan Ed Crawford after the death of D. Boon. Left SST for Columbia Records after 1989.
Bl'ast	1987–1989	It's In My Blood (1987), School's Out (1987), The Power Of Expression (1988) [reissue], Take That Manic Ride (1989)	Hardcore band from Santa Cruz, California, who frequently drew comparisons to mid-era Black Flag, whom the group admitted was a huge influence. Their 1986 debut, The Power Of Expression was reissued by SST in 1988. Current Alice In Chains frontman William DuVall was briefly a guitar player for the band but did not appear on any releases.
Bad Brains	1986–1988	I Against I (1986), Live (1988), The Youth Are Getting Restless (1990), Spirit Electricity (1991)	Bad Brains signed to SST Records in 1986 to release I Against I, their first studio album in three years. According to Joe Carducci's book Rock and the Pop Narcotic, SST had extended an open invitation to the band for years prior to the signing. SST ended up releasing three LPs and one EP by the band, all live recordings, aside from I Against I, the last two coming after Bad Brains had jumped to Caroline Records.
Screaming Trees	1987–1989	Even If and Especially When (1987), Other Worlds (1987) [reissue], Invisible Lantern (1988), Buzz Factory (1989), Anthology: SST Years 1985–1989 (retrospective)	Grunge band from Ellensburg, Washington, who existed from 1985 until 2000. In 1990, the band made the jump to a major label, signing to Epic Records and in 1992 scored a hit with the song "Nearly Lost You" but were unable to maintain their success. In 1991, SST released a compilation which featured tracks from their 3 full-length SST releases as well as their first EP, Other Worlds, which was originally released in 1985 and reissued by SST in 1987.
Universal Congress Of	1987–1988	Joe Baiza & The Universal Congress Of (1988), Prosperous and Qualified (1989)	Free Jazz band formed in 1986 by Joe Baiza
