= Overkill L.A. =

American punk/metal band

Overkill
- Also known as: Overkill; SST Overkill
- Origin: Los Angeles, California, U.S.
- Genres: Hardcore punk, speed metal
- Years active: 1980–1983, 2005–2007
- Label: SST Records
- Members: John Joe Gurule "Rocking" Ron Foster "Thee" Johnny Ray Soto; Justin Herrera; Eliseo Almaviva-Matta
- Past members: Merril Ward; Kurt Markham; Ron Cordy; Geoff Dimmick; Felice LoCoco; Scott Kidd

Overkill L.A. or SST Overkill was a hardcore punk/speed metal band started in 1980 in Los Angeles and which recorded two records on SST Records and some tracks on compilations. The band started as Overkill but they were renamed Overkill L.A. by SST Records when they re-released their debut album in 1992 and SST Overkill when they reunited in 2005.

== History ==
Overkill began in late 1980 when guitar player Kurt Markham, the main songwriter, and bass player Ron Cordy, who composed most of the band's music, decided to start a band. Kurt soon switched to drums because he wanted his friend guitarist Felice Lococo to join the band but it didn't work, so they added Geoff Dimmick on guitar. John Joe Gurule was also added as the singer.

Black Flag guitar player and SST Records owner Greg Ginn saw Overkill play and wanted them on his label but, soon after, Kurt and Ron grew tired of Gurule and expelled him from the band. Meanwhile, Black Flag had offered one of their roadies (and the Nig-Heist guitar player), Merrill Ward, to be their new singer before hiring Henry Rollins in 1981. Merrill refused and preferred joining Overkill. As the singer, Merrill helped the band gain recognition with his crazy stage antics, like lighting a jockstrap around his testicles on fire.

Overkill entered the studio in early 1981 and recorded their first 7" E.P., Hell's Getting Hotter with Spot, which was released on SST Records later that year. After hearing the record, Lococo changed his mind and joined Overkill after Dimmick quit due to family matters. The band also started recording their first LP, Triumph of the Will in 1982. The instrumental tracks were completed in April and then Overkill played shows in Los Angeles, San Francisco, Santa Barbara, and San Pedro before kicking Ward out of the band before he could record the vocal tracks. Merrill was fired for calling the rest of the band "his backup band" and claiming he was going to "quit" while talking to groupies.

Stepmothers lead singer Steve Jones (not to be confused with the Sex Pistols Steve Jones) was then asked to take Merrill's place, even though, according to Jones: "Merrill was one of the best front men [he'd] ever seen." Jones re-wrote the lyrics and fronted the band for about 2 months, doing double duty with his main band The Stepmothers. He then dropped out because, as he put it: "The Stepmothers were [his] first love, and, frankly, the drive between Claremont, where the Stepmothers were based, and the Overkill rehearsal studio in South Bay was killing [him]." There was also reportedly some friction between Posh Boy and SST about this arrangement, although the Stepmothers were quite friendly with the Black Flag tribe and Greg and Chuck jumped on stage with the band at Stepmothers gigs on more than one occasion.

Scott Kidd was then hired as the new singer and played a few shows. Brian Slagel from Metal Blade Records was present at one of these shows and asked Overkill to do a three-song demo. The song No Holds Barred was taken from that demo and appeared on the Metal Massacre II compilation released in 1982. In late '82, Overkill played at the Troubadour in West Hollywood, with the band Trauma and it was at that show that Metallica's singer-guitar player James Hetfield and drummer Lars Ulrich saw Trauma bass player Cliff Burton for the first time and hired him.

Tensions had also arose between the band and Greg Ginn after they fired Merrill and Ginn announced that he wouldn't let them finish Triumph of the Will. The band dissolved in July 1983 when Kidd, Lococo and Cordy told Markham they quit because they were angry at him for letting his girlfriend hurt the band, with her input that they should drop great metal songs for more AOR radio friendly material, that Cordy, and Lococo absolutely detested. Cordy joined Bitch as their bass player and Markham became the drummer for Dez Cadena's band D.C.3. Meanwhile, Merrill became an actor and joined Chuck Dukowski's post-Black Flag band SWA.

Lococo visited SST Records in 1984 and Ginn told him he wished to release Triumph of the Will anyway, hoping Overkill would come back together but it didn't happen, so Ginn asked Merrill Ward to write some lyrics and do the vocal tracks. Triumph of the Will was finally released in 1985 on SST Records. In 1992, Ginn re-released the Overkill material on SST and renamed the band as Overkill L.A.

Lococo then formed Crackhead Killer in 2001, with fans of Overkill L.A. The band consisted of Steve Contreras on Guitar, Dr. Know Rick Contreras Jr. on Drums, Dr. Know and Rick Contreras Sr. on Bass, with Lococo rounding out the band on Guitar. The band recorded a 3 track demo that is available on the internet through a Google search of Crackhead Killer. The band never played live due to other personal obligations, and fell apart due to this. It was meant to be a fun project, and never something that was meant to be a career. Some internet articles thought this band was formed after SST Overkill split up but this will clear up the confusion.

The L.A. Overkill reunited in 2005 under the name SST Overkill, after a buzz was created when another punk band named Instigator covered "Hells Getting Hotter" on their CD. With Lococo on guitar, Markham on drums, Gurule on vocals and Dimmick switching from guitar to bass. They recorded demos that were released on the band's Myspace page. But soon, tensions started to arise again between Lococo and other members, due to musical differences. Lococo didn't want to continue only playing songs from the 80s, and was left out of regular band meetings to discuss the band's future. Lococo quit to be replaced by "Rocking Ron" Foster. Markham and Dimmick also quit to be replaced by Justin Herrera and Eliseo Almaviva-Matta while "Thee" Johnny Ray Soto was added on second guitar, leaving Gurule as the only original member. The band officially came to an end in 2007, when fans realized that Joe Gurule's new band was basically a cover band covering SST Overkill songs.

== Confusion ==
Overkill's name has been a source of confusion for metal fans since a New Jersey thrash metal band of the same name released their first EP in 1984. Some fans of the New Jersey Overkill were disappointed upon their purchase of Triumph of the Will, thinking they'd discovered some long-lost album by their thrash metal heroes only to discover an entirely different band.

SST retitled CD copies of Triumph of the Will to read "Overkill L.A." when they re-released it in 1992 to end the confusion, and because Overkill had copyrighted the name. When they reunited, the band chose to use the name SST Overkill, to eliminate any sort of confusion between the New Jersey Overkill and the L.A. band. Joe and Kurt also considered themselves the last SST band standing, which is incorrect since Gone and Lawndale still exist.

== Members ==
- John Joe Gurule – vocals (1980–1981, 2005–2007)
- Rocking Ron Foster – guitar (2005–2007)
- Thee Johnny Ray Soto – guitar (2006–2007)
- Eliseo Almaviva-Matta – bass (2006–2007)
- Justin Herrera – drums (2006–2007)
- Merrill Ward – vocals (1981–1982)
- Steve Jones – vocals (1982)
- Scott Kidd – vocals (1982–1983)
- Kurt Markham – drums (1980–1983, 2005–2006)
- Geoff Dimmick – guitar (1980–1981), bass (2005–2006)
- Ron Cordy – bass (1980–1983)
- Felice Lococo – guitar (1981–1983, 2005)

== Discography ==
=== As Overkill ===
Albums

- 1985: Triumph of the Will (re-released on CD in 1992 under the name of Overkill L.A.)

EPs

- 1982: Overkill (often entitled as Hell's Getting Hotter)

Non-album tracks on V.A. compilations

- 1986: "Over the Edge" (The Blasting Concept – Volume II)

Other appearances on compilations

- 1982: "No Holds Barred" (Metal Massacre II) (This version is different to the album version on Triumph of the Will.)
- 1983: "Hell's Getting Hotter" (The Blasting Concept)
- 1986: "Head on", "Victimized" and "Ladies in Leather" (Program: Annihilator – A Soundtrack for Destruction)
- 1986: "Hell's Getting Hotter", "Our War", "Burn the School" and "Don't Wanna Be Told" (The 7 Inch Wonders of the World)

=== As SST Overkill ===
EPs

- 2005: SST Overkill
