= Hotel X =

American world music/jazz group

Hotel X is a world music/jazz group founded in 1992 in Richmond, Virginia, by Tim Harding and Ron T. Curry as a setting to explore electric bass duets. Hotel X was quickly joined by a host of Richmond underground music scene veterans and released six albums on the Los Angeles–based SST Records. SST Records was founded by members of the seminal punk rock group Black Flag and included in their catalog some of the great American underground groups such as Minutemen, Meat Puppets, Hüsker Dü, Sonic Youth, Sound Garden, Universal Congress Of and Saccharine Trust.

Hotel X toured regionally and nationally between 1992 and 1997, received reviews in Jazz Times, The Washington Post, Option, The Wire and Alternative Press among others; was nominated for Best Jazz Group by the National Association of Independent Record Distributors (NAIRD) in 1996; and participated in the JVC Jazz Festival in New York City in 1997. National Public Radio selected soundbites of several songs from the Hotel X album Engendered Species for use between news stories in 1994. Richmond Magazine awarded Hotel X with the Pollack Prize for Excellence in Arts in September 2005.

== Music history ==
In the biography Fela - the Life and Times of an African Musical Icon by Yale professor Michael E. Veal, Hotel X is briefly mentioned (alongside the Art Ensemble of Chicago, Branford Marsalis and Steve Turre) on page 259 where the author talks about the broad influence of Fela Kuti's Afrobeat style.

From 1998 to the present Hotel X has been mining the musical wealth of Africa and Latin America by using rhythms and melodies inspired by traditional music and contemporary composers from those regions. The 2003 self-produced/released seventh album by Hotel X titled Hymns for Children marks the departure from the group's earlier more electric, harmolodic adventures into the organic, world music-inspired band of today.

In 1994 Hotel X contributed an original composition, "One Way Street" (released on the CD Ladders in 1995), to the trailer of the film Hands of Fate by Chris Quinn which was shown at the Sundance Film Festival. Quinn's documentary film God Grew Tired of Us is the winner of both the Grand Jury Prize and Audience Award at the 2006 Sundance Film Festival.

Hotel X has shared the stage with Bern Nix (Ornette Coleman and Primetime), Greg Ginn (Black Flag), Balla Kouyate (Super Rail Band), Papa Susso (Gambian kora master), The Roots, Yellowman, Medeski Martin & Wood, Ran Blake, Hasidic New Wave, Marc Ribot, Plunky Branch, Wayne Horvitz, Pigpen, Amy Denio, John Bradshaw and Bazooka, among others.

== Band members ==
=== Current ===
- Tim Harding – alto sax ( Always August, Yeni Nostalji, Office Ladies, New Ting Ting Loft, Joyful Noise Big Band, Thomas Mapfumo)
- Chris Vasi – guitar (Monk's Playground, Afro-Zen All stars, Illbillys, Crumbs of Insanity)
- Charles Nill – guitar (Burst Into Flames, Richmond Afrobeat, Unity Sound)
- Carter Blough – bass (Lawrence Olds Band, etc.)
- O.J. Hunter – Keyboards (Awareness Art Ensemble, Hamiet Bluiett, Nina Simone, Unity Sound Reggae Band, One)
- Hunter Duke – drums (Amphetamine Library, Apocowlypso, Retinal Circus, Flannel, Mystery Machine, The Knievels, Schwa, Tree Fort Angst, The Nixon Years)
- James McDonald – percussion (Spirit Drummers)
- Adrien Bayo – percussion (Spirit Drummers)
- Michael Reitz – percussion (One, Richmond Afrobeat, Unity Sound Reggae Band, Spirit Drummers)

=== Former ===
- David Wayne O’Bryan Jr.
- Roberto Curtis
- Jeff X Morris
- Ron Curry
- Tony Costa
- Lance Koehler
- Danny Finney
- Molly Berg
- Jennifer Thomas
- George Lowe
- Jimmy Ghaphery
- Jim Thomson
- Woody Jackson
- John Keifer
- Chris Farmer
- Chris Davis
- Tom Wall
- Billy Fox
- Steve Mathews
- Darryl Davenport
- Jon Mela
- Patrick W Best (PELT, Tanakh, The Din, Spiral Joy Band)
- Eric Unger
- Javier Ramos
- Samson Trihn
- Kelli Strawbridge
- Jorge Negron
- Rei Gonzalez Alvarez
- Gabo Tomassini
- Justin Riccio
- Bern Nix
- Greg Ginn
- Joe Baiza
- Ogynga
- Scott Frock
- Jason Stith
- Phil Murphy
- Larry Bodie
- Al Clark
- Toby Whittaker
- Gordon Jones
- Fred McGann
- Akili Obika
- Charlie Kilpatrick
- Johnny Hott
- Tony Atherton
- Vince Megrouni
- Pooh Johnston
- Marty McCavitt
- Pippin Barnett
- Barry Bless
- Bruce Waters
- Plunky Branch
- Bala Kouyate
- Josh Boden
- Lundin Lamb
- Ron "Rollo" Fix
- Paul Watson
- David Brogan
