= Sylvia Juncosa =

- Genres: Instrumental rock, punk rock, jazz fusion, heavy metal, post punk, hard rock
- Occupations: Musician, songwriter, computer programmer
- Instruments: Guitar, piano, keyboard, vocals
- Years active: 1981–present
- Labels: Ringent, SST, Restless, Fundamental
- Website: sylviajuncosa.com

Sylvia Juncosa is an American punk and metal guitarist, singer, songwriter and keyboardist from Los Angeles. Noted primarily for her guitar work, during the 1980s she was among relatively few women with established aggressive rock guitar credibility. She released four solo albums and three albums with her band, To Damascus, after starting her career as a keyboard player in The Leaving Trains. She was also a member of the band SWA with ex-Black Flag bass player Chuck Dukowski. She was active from 1980 to 1995 before taking a hiatus, then started playing guitar again in 2009.

== Biography ==
=== Early life ===
Juncosa was born and raised in Los Angeles. She started playing piano and composing instrumental pieces when she was six years old.

=== The Leaving Trains ===
The Leaving Trains was the first band Juncosa joined, as keyboard player, when she was 16 years old. They released the "Bringing Down the House" / "Going Down to Town" 7" single and appeared on the Keats Rides a Harley compilation. She left that band in 1982, citing a preference for guitar over keyboards.

=== To Damascus ===
Afterward, touring with Clay Allison, playing keyboards and acoustic rhythm guitar, Juncosa started To Damascus, named after a play by August Strindberg. The band experienced numerous personnel changes over the next three years. They recorded a single at Radio Tokyo studio with producer Ethan James, where the majority of Juncosa's releases would later be recorded. For a very brief period in 1985, she was the guitar player in The Healing Dream, which soon afterward became The Nymphs. When David Winogrond and Tyra von Pagenhardt joined in 1985, To Damascus finally had a more stable line-up and began a busy, productive period that would exemplify Juncosa's high-activity work style during those years. The band completed and released its first album, Succumb, which Juncosa had started earlier with former Leaving Trains members Jason Kahn (drums) and Tom Hofer (bass) filling in. Shortly afterward, they recorded a second album, Come to Your Senses, distributed by Restless Records, and embarked on a shoestring-budget US tour.

To Damascus broke up on friendly terms in 1988 when Winogrond and von Pagenhardt were unable to commit to the touring musician life that Juncosa intended to embark upon.

=== SWA ===
In 1986, Juncosa also joined the SST Records band SWA, which featured bassist Chuck Dukowski, former Black Flag member and co-founder of the SST record label. In interviews, Juncosa asserted that joining SWA came about by happenstance when she called SST on behalf of her band, To Damascus. She got in a long conversation with Dukowski, and auditioned for his band the same night. SWA soon recorded the album XCIII, which spawned the single "Arroyo" and its accompanying video. Juncosa was gigging constantly with both SWA and To Damascus during this time, and 1987 quit SWA to focus solely on one band.

=== Solo career ===
Juncosa abandoned the band name to go solo for more flexibility and options with the inevitably changing band lineups. Her music was also moving toward a more hard rock sound. With the 1988 release of Nature (SST Records), Juncosa attained some notoriety as a guitarist and for being one of a relative minority of female players with an aggressive hard rock style.

In 1988, the band made a mini-tour in New York, then the first European tour, which was well-received. Following that was a US tour as opening act for Soundgarden, who were SST label-mates before moving to major-label status.

The album One Thing (Fundamental Records) was recorded in 1989 with Barney Firks on bass and Chris Frye on drums, on loan from the San Diego band Wormdrive. Then came the second European tour. This was the peak, career-wise with the biggest recording budget and biggest gigs. Europe had appealed to Juncosa from the start, and when she got an offer to stay there awhile she took it. As well as the band tours and solo shows, she explored Europe, wandered alone, learned German, indulged a brief obsession with chess, and went to India.

The Is album was recorded in the Netherlands with engineer Gertjan ("Joe"). Firks and Frye had come out from the States and they lived at the studio for a couple weeks in semi-rural seclusion. Frye left unexpectedly mid-project but things were continued. Then came another tour, and Juncosa's hiatus from guitar playing.

=== Hiatus and comeback ===
In 1995, Juncosa started a long period of musical inactivity when she worked in Europe as a computer programmer and had personal problems before eventually coming back to the US.

In 2009, Juncosa decided that she wanted to play guitar again and formed a new band with Legal Weapon member Steve Reed. She also played in the Cooling System project, with multi-instrumentist Azalia Snail. She began working on a new album in 2013, along with Steve Reed on bass and on drums Joe Berardi, a long-time Los Angeles drummer known for his work with the Fibonaccis, Stan Ridgway and others. The album Wanna Gotta was released on her own Ringent Records in 2015.

== Personal life ==
- Juncosa is left-handed, but plays guitar right-handed
- Juncosa is a surfer

== Discography ==
Solo Albums

- Nature (SST Records, 1988)
- One Thing (Fundamental Records, 1989)
- Is (Glitterhouse Records, 1991)
- Live in Rome (Helter Skelter Records, 1991)
- Wanna Gotta (Ringent Records, 2015)

With To Damascus

- Another Place, Another Time/On a Pier (Ringent Records, 1984)
- Succumb (Ringent Records, 1986)
- Come to Your Senses (Restless Records, 1987)

With SWA

- XCIII (SST Records, 1987)
- Arroyo (SST Records, 1987)
- Evolution (SST Records, 1988)

With The Leaving Trains

- Bringing Down the House/Going Down to Town 7" (Happy Squid Records, 1981)

=== Compilations ===
- "Virginia City" (by The Leaving Trains) on Keats Rides a Harley – (Happy Squid Records, 1982)
- "Strange Fruit" on Mondostereo – (Tinnitus Label, 1988)
- "Lick my pussy, Eddie Van Halen'" and "Tower of Ashes" on Program: Annihilator II – (SST Records, 1989)
- "One in Three" on Radio Tokyo Tapes, Vol. IV – (Chameleon Records, 1990)
- "The Desert Song (live)" on VERA Groningen – Beauty in the Underworld – (Vera Records/Semaphore Records, 1990)
- "(Lost in) Love Hell" on Love is My Only Crime – (Veracity Musik / Intercord Records, 1994)
- "Night Surfing" and "And Leave And Leave Me" by To Damascus on Warfrat Tales Unabridged (Avebury Records, 2007)
