= SWA (band) =

American band

SWA (pronounced swǒ) was an American band originally started as a concept defined by Chuck Dukowski, former bassist of Black Flag, while he was still a member of that band. The name (which is pronounced like "Swah" and not "S-W-A") was created by assigning an alphabetical value to numbers on a gaming die, then rolling the die three times. Dukowski would later claim that the name was offered up by Joe Carducci and was accepted by the rest of the band, despite Dukowski's own discomfort with it. SWA has had the dubious distinction of being considered the "worst" band to ever record for SST Records by many label aficionados and, in one fanzine article, Steve Albini claimed that among the worst things a person could do was "listen to SWA" and "be SWA". However, others have come to the band's defense. The band existed from the mid 1980s until 1992 and released five albums on SST Records, all of which are currently out of print.

== History ==
Following his departure from Black Flag in 1983, Chuck Dukowski set about reforming his first band, Würm. Despite recording an album, Würm's reunion was short-lived. Chuck soon became acquainted with Greg Cameron, a teenaged-drummer who was hanging out and jamming around SST Records' rehearsal space. The two began playing together and were soon joined by guitarist Ted Falconi (of Flipper), but this line-up was short-lived. The group was soon rounded out by former Overkill vocalist Merrill Ward, Frantic Technoid's guitarist Richard Ford, and Greg Cameron's high school friend, Ray Cooper, also on guitar. In 1985, the band recorded their debut Your Future (If You Have One), which was produced by Chuck's former Black Flag bandmate, Greg Ginn. After the recording, Cooper departed the group to play with the Descendents, with whom he had played with off and on since 1982. Following 1986's Sex Dr. (a reference to Cameron's nickname, "The Nazi Sex Doctor"), Ford also departed, as his responsibilities as SST Record's label manager ended up leaving him with little time for the band. He was replaced by Sylvia Juncosa for 1987's XCIII. Juncosa left the group to pursue a solo career shortly afterwards. Ed Gregor replaced Sylvia, but was only in the band a short time, participating in the songs on the next album, "Winter", but left the band to go to University. Phil Van Duyne played guitar on 1989's Winter. Following Winter, Merrill Ward left SWA to pursue an acting career. The group pressed on as a trio, with Chuck Dukowski handling the bulk of the vocals on 1991's Volume, which proved to be SWA's final release.

Early in SWA's existence, Dukowski and Cameron were also members of October Faction. In the mid 1990s, Dukowski and Van Duyne teamed up in the band Fishcamp.

== Members ==
- Chuck Dukowski - Bass, Lead Vocals (on Volume)
- Greg Cameron - Drums
- Merrill Ward - Lead Vocals on Your Future... through Winter, guest appearance on Volume
- Rich Ford - Guitar on Your Future... and Sex Dr.
- Ray Cooper - Guitar on Your Future...
- Sylvia Juncosa - Guitar on XCIII and "Arroyo" 12"
- Ed Gregor - Guitar (Replaced Sylvia Juncosa and participated in song creation for the album "Winter", but did not record)
- Phil Van Duyne - Guitar on Winter and Volume
- Ted Falconi - Guitar (participated in early jams with Dukowski and Cameron but left before anything was recorded because of his commitment to Flipper).

== Discography ==
- Albums
  - Your Future (If You Have One) LP (SST Records, 1985)
  - Sex Dr. LP (SST Records, 1986)
  - XCIII LP (SST Records, 1987)
  - Winter LP/CD (SST Records, 1989)
  - Volume LP/CD (SST Records, 1991)
- Singles
  - "Arroyo" b/w "Optimist" 12" (SST Records, 1987)
- Compilations
  - Evolution 85-87 CD (SST Records, 1988) - features tracks from the first 3 LPs
