= Tree Fort Angst =

American indie pop band

- Origin: Richmond, Virginia
- Genres: Indie pop
- Years active: 1991–1994
- Labels: Bus Stop
- Past members: Terry Banks; John Gotschalk; Hunter Duke

Tree Fort Angst (sometimes abbreviated to TFA) was an indie pop band that was originally a solo project of former St. Christopher guitarist Terry Banks.

== History ==
Banks began working as a part of Tree Fort Angst in 1991, when he released a cassette-only album. This was followed by an EP in 1992 on the German label 'A Turntable Friend', Six Songs. TFA then expanded to a full band with the addition of John Gotschalk (bass) and Hunter Duke (drums). Although the band only released a handful of further EPs and singles during their time together before splitting up in 1994, their output was collected on two posthumous compilations.

Banks lists among his influences Postcard Records bands Orange Juice and Aztec Camera, The Beatles, The Jam, Everything But The Girl, The Go-Betweens, The Smiths, and The Chills.

Banks later joined Glo-worm, The Saturday People, and Dot Dash, while Gotschalk joined the Red Hot Lava Men. Duke is now a member of Hotel X.

== Discography ==
=== Singles ===
- Six Songs 7-inch EP (1992) A Turntable Friend
- Buzzing With Beauty and Wonder 7-inch EP (1992) Velodrome
- "Parting Kiss" 7-inch flexi-disc (1993) Ad Lithium Pop
- Tilting at Windmills EP (1994) Bus Stop
- "Hope" (1995) Stickboy

=== Albums ===
- Fifteen Songs of Vim and Vigor (cassette) (1991) (self-released)
- Knee Deep in the Rococo Excess of Tree Fort Angst (1997) Bus Stop
- Last Page in the Book of Love (2002) Foxyboy

=== Compilation appearances ===
- "Parting Kiss", on CMJ New Music Report CD album (1991) CMJ
- "You Should’ve Seen The One That Got Away", on One Last Kiss CD album (1992) Spin Art
- "Trampoline", on Burning The Midnight Firefly cassette/fanzine (1993) BTMF
- "Miss You Essay", on Stars On Ice cassette/fanzine (1993) Traumatone
- "Trampoline", on A Love Like Lead cassette/fanzine (1993) Lionhead Fountain
- "Trampoline", on Something Pretty Beautiful CD album (1993) Brilliant
- "Fin De Siecle", on Calling At Duke Street split 7-inch EP (1993) A Turntable Friend
- "Back In Your Life", on Can You Talk To The Dude? (Jonathan Richman covers CD) (1994) Alienor
- "Tuesday", on Pop Culture Press 4 CD (1997) PCP
- "Hope", on A Boy, A Girl, and A Rendezvous CD (2001) Red Roses For Me
