= Stains (Los Angeles band) =

American hardcore punk band

The Stains is an American hardcore punk band from the Boyle Heights neighborhood of Los Angeles, California, United States. One of the first East Los Angeles punk groups, the band started playing punk in 1976. Their style is described as hardcore and speedy, and as an innovator in bringing elements of metal into hardcore.

== History ==
The Stains recorded their debut album in 1981, produced by SST Records house producer Spot. It was released by SST in 1983. The debut album is often considered influential in bridging hardcore punk and heavy metal before the creation of thrash metal. The band has been on tours with Black Flag, Hüsker Dü and countless others.

They were one of the bands that played at a 2001 "anniversary show" memorializing the landmark East Los Angeles punk venue, Vex Populi. The music writer Josh Kun wrote in Los Angeles magazine that their set was "punk rock enough for the Stains to leave a pool of blood on the stage's wood beams".

== Members ==
On their album, the band's members were Jesus Amezquita, lead guitar, Robert Becerra, guitar; Ceasar Viscarra, bass; Gilbert Berumen, drums; and Rudy Navarro, vocalist. Guitarist Robert Becerra's performance style was a model for Greg Ginn's musical concepts for Black Flag. Viscarra and another Stains drummer, Louie Dufau, later played with Dez Cadena in his post-Black Flag band DC3, and Viscarra also played with cowpunk band, Blood on the Saddle. Becerra died on September 1, 2023, at the age of 64.

== Discography ==
=== Studio albums ===
- Stains (1982)
