= Mojack =

- Origin: Los Angeles, California, United States
- Genres: Punk rock Jazz rock
- Years active: 1995 - present
- Labels: SST Records
- Members: Greg Ginn (Guitar); Steve Sharp (Bass guitar); Tony Atherton (Saxophone, Clarinet); Andy Batwinas (percussion); Richie West (drums)
- Website: www.mojackmusic.com

Mojack is an instrumental rock band, formed by ex-Black Flag guitarist Greg Ginn. The music of Mojack is similar to another one of Ginn's instrumental projects, Gone, however, it is much more jazz-oriented. Besides Ginn on guitar, the band includes ex-member of Bazooka Tony Atherton playing saxophone and clarinet, Steve Sharp on bass guitar, Andy Batwinas on percussion, and Richie West on drums.

== Discography ==
- Merchandising Murder (1995)
- Home Brew (1997)
- Rub-a-Dub (2003, unreleased)
- Under The Willow Tree (2007)
- The Metal Years (2008)
- Hijinks (2011)
- Car (2013)
