= Angst (band) =

American band

Angst was an American band from San Francisco, California.

== History ==
In mid-1978, brothers Joseph Pope and Jon E. Risk formed their first punk rock group, the Instants, in Boulder, Colorado. The band gigged in the Denver/Boulder area before moving to England in late 1979 where they lasted only a few months. In 1980 Joseph and Jon then settled in San Francisco and formed Angst along with drummer Michael Hursey (later replaced by Andy Kaps).

Angst played their first show in mid-1981, and by the end of 1982 had contributed songs to Sub Pop (when it was still a cassette magazine) and the Alternative Tentacles/Maximum RocknRoll compilation, Not So Quiet on the Western Front. From the outset the band gigged regularly in San Francisco and Los Angeles, and sometime in 1982 they played a show with the Middle Class and 100 Flowers in San Francisco. John Talley-Jones (Urinals/100 Flowers) was impressed enough with the group that he offered to release a record for them on his label, Happy Squid Records. Angst traveled to Los Angeles shortly thereafter and recorded seven songs at Radio Tokyo studios (engineered by Ethan James) that would become their debut, eponymous 12”, released in 1983. This EP included songs lampooning Neil Armstrong and Nancy Reagan.

Though Angst played many venues with a wide variety of bands, the majority of their shows locally were within the punk/hardcore scene. Their eclectic mix of punk, country, pop, 1960s garage, etc. was not particularly well received by the strict hardcore audiences of early 1980s San Francisco. Angst actively sought out and played with many of Los Angeles-based SST Records’ bands (Minutemen, Saccharine Trust, Meat Puppets, Black Flag, et al.), and in 1984 was signed to the label by Joe Carducci, who subsequently produced the first two (of four) LPs that Angst recorded for the label (the latter LPs were produced by Vitus Matare of the Last).

These three guys are smart enough to know they have a problem—they can't sing. They're also smart enough not to let that stop them.

— Christgau's Record Guide: The '80s (1990)

The group's debut full-length, Lite Life, was issued in 1985, which Trouser Press praised as "prov[ing] Angst’s prowess for turning politically informed ideas into mature and witty tunes." After releasing Lite Life, Angst began to play outside of California, and embarked on their first national tour. Over the next four years they toured America and Europe several times, as well as continuing to play regularly in the San Francisco Bay Area and Los Angeles, though they were never able to gain any kind of following in their own home town. The group's final album, Cry for Happy, appeared in 1988. By early 1989 the band had run its course, and broke up after their final European tour.

In later years, Angst would be cited by Black Francis/Frank Black of Pixies fame as a major influence upon his work. He covered “Some Things (I Can’t Get Used To)” on his Snake Oil LP, and wrote a tribute song to the band entitled simply “Angst” that appears on the UK-only CD release of “Robert Onion” as well as on the One More Road For The Hit collection of B-sides and rarities. When asked by Rolling Stone magazine what band he would like to see reunite, he stated: “Angst. I'm sure there are other bands called Angst, but this is an obscure one from SST in the mid-Eighties. They used to play at the Rathskeller in Boston -- that's where I first heard them. Then I bought all their records. They were a San Francisco trio -- high energy but not punk -- and they were very influential on the Pixies and on me. Lite Life is their best album -- good luck finding it”.

== Members ==
- Joseph Pope - vocals, bass
- Jon E. Risk - vocals, guitar
- Michael Hursey - drums
- Andy Kaps - drums (on Cry for Happy only)

== Discography ==
Albums

- Angst 7-song 12" (Happy Squid Records 1983, reissued on SST Records, 1986)
- Lite Life LP (SST, 1985)
- Mending Wall LP (SST, 1986)
- Mystery Spot LP (SST, 1987)
- Cry for Happy LP (SST, 1988)

Compilation Appearances

- "Give All The Power To The U.S." (song on Sub Pop No. 7 cassette magazine, 1982)
- "Worker Bee" (song on Not So Quiet on the Western Front compilation LP, Alternative Tentacles/Maximum RocknRoll Records 1982)
- "Judge And Jury" (song on Onslaught No. 6 cassette magazine, 1985)
- "Just Me" (song on 'The Blasting Concept Vol. 2' LP, SST 1985)
- "Colors" (song on SST Acoustic LP, SST 1991)
