= October Faction (band) =

1980s American punk rock band

- Origin: Redondo Beach, California, United States
- Genres: Punk
- Years active: 1980s
- Members: Bill Stevenson; Chuck Dukowski; Greg Ginn; Joe Baiza; Tom Troccoli; Greg Cameron

October Faction was a band active in the 1980s formed by several members of Black Flag.

== Discography ==
- October Faction (SST Records, 1985)
- Second Factionalization (SST Records, 1986)
- "I Was Grotesque" on The Blasting Concept, Vol. 2 compilation (SST Records, 1986)

== See also ==
- Gone
- Black Flag
- SWA
- Saccharine Trust
