= Keats Rides a Harley =

Compilation album by Various Artists
- Released: Original release in 1981; Re-released on September 13, 2005
- Length: 9 at 21:51 (original version); 23 at 57:08 (2005 version)
- Label: 1981: Happy Squid; 2005: Warning Label

Professional ratings
Review scores
Source	Rating
Allmusic	4/5 stars

Keats Rides a Harley was a compilation-EP released in 1981 on the Happy Squid label. It was re-released in 2005 with 14 extra tracks. It was mostly produced by Vitus Matare, except track 5, Meat Puppets "H-Elenore", which was produced by Darrell De Marco, and track 8, Human Hands "Hypnotica", which was produced by Human Hands.

== Track listing ==
=== Original album ===
1. The Earwigs - "A Martyr is Made" (Kerns/Turkle/Underhill/Willard) - 2:32
2. Toxic Shock - "Sensationalism" (Anderson/Ziegler) - 1:25
3. S Squad - "Scene of the Crime" (Saffery/Stolze) - 2:37
4. The Gun Club - Devil in the Woods" (Jeffrey Lee Pierce) - 3:22
5. Meat Puppets - "H-Elenore" (Curt Kirkwood) - 1:40
6. The Leaving Trains - "Virginia City" (Manfred Hofer/James "Falling James" Moreland) - 2:12
7. Tunneltones - "Is This a Restart?" (Erskine/Licher/Spinelli/Voznick) - 1:39
8. Human Hands - "Hypnotica" (Human Hands) - 4:01
9. 100 Flowers - "Salmonella" (Johansen/Jones) - 2:23

=== CD Reissue ===
1. The Earwigs - "A Martyr is Made" (Kerns/Turkle/Underhill/Willard) - 2:32
2. Toxic Shock - "Sensationalism" (Anderson/Ziegler) - 1:25
3. S Squad - "Scene of the Crime" (Saffery/Stolze) - 2:37
4. The Gun Club - Devil in the Woods" (Jeffrey Lee Pierce) - 3:22
5. Meat Puppets - "H-Elenore" (Curt Kirkwood) - 1:40
6. The Leaving Trains - "Virginia City" (Tom Hofer/James "Falling James" Moreland) - 2:12
7. Tunneltones - "Is This a Restart?" (Erskine/Licher/Spinelli/Voznick) - 1:39
8. Human Hands - "Hypnotica" (Human Hands) - 4:01
9. 100 Flowers - "Salmonella" (Johansen/Jones) - 2:23
10. The Earwigs - "Freedom" (Kerns/Turkle/Underhill/Willard) - 2:47
11. Toxic Shock - "Fat" (Anderson/Ziegler) - 1:33
12. S Squad - "Virgins" (Stolze) - 3:36
13. The Gun Club - "Preaching Blues" (Jeffrey Lee Pierce) - 4:34
14. Meat Puppets - "The Losing End" (Neil Young) - 3:42
15. The Leaving Trains - "Cigarette Motel" (James "Falling James" Moreland) - 1:26
16. Tunneltones - "Happyland" (Erskine/Gross/Licher/Spinelli/Voznick) - 3:31
17. Human Hands - "Jimmy Loop" (Human Hands) - 5:51
18. 100 Flowers - "Sensible Virgins" (Jones) - 1:16
19. Urinals - "U" (Johansen/Jones) - 0:39
20. Danny and the Doorknobs - "Melody" (Hinge) - 2:19
21. Arrow Book Club - "Get Down, Part 4" (Arrow Book Club) - 1:35
22. Vidiots - "Laurie's Lament" (Murphy/Windfield) - 1:41
23. Phil Bedel - "Caterpillar Stomp" (Phil Bedel) - 0:49
