= Blast (American band) =

American punk rock band

BL'AST!
- Origin: Santa Cruz, California, U.S.
- Genres: Hardcore punk; punk rock
- Years active: 1983–1991; 2001; 2013–present
- Labels: SST; Green World; Southern Lord; Rise Records
- Members: Mike Neider; Nick Oliveri; Joey Castillo; Dave Cooper
- Past members: Bill Torgerson; Clifford Dinsmore; William DuVall; John Schuler; Ron Isa; Steve Borek; Hoss Wright
- Website: blastofficial.com

Blast (stylized as BL'AST!) is an American punk rock band formed in 1983 in Santa Cruz, California. After breaking up in 1991, they reunited in 2001 and again in 2013. To date, Blast has released three original studio albums (the latest being 1989's Take the Manic Ride), and they have gone through several lineup changes, leaving guitarist Mike Neider as the only constant member.

== History ==
Blast released their first album, The Power of Expression, in 1986. It was recorded and mixed by Vince Sanchez at Fane Studio in Santa Cruz, CA which got them signed to Green World Records. Blast caught the attention of SST Records, who signed them for their next release, 1987's It's in My Blood. That same year, a 7-inch was released, including a cover of Alice Cooper's "School's Out". They also were releasing new music on Santa Cruz Skateboard videos. SST and Santa Cruz Skateboards began shared videos and merchandise bridged by Blast as Neider had worked for the skateboard company for many years. The band's third release for SST was Take the Manic Ride, released in 1989.

Blast broke up in 1991 while working on their next album. Neider and Torgerson began Blackout, releasing one 7-inch under that name, and then LAB, who put out a 7-inch EP and a four-song CD and continued into the late 1990s, playing many shows with Fu Manchu. Former Kyuss and Fu Manchu drummer Brant Bjork moved to Santa Cruz to briefly join LAB before joining up with Fu Manchu. In 2001, Blast reunited for shows on the West Coast of the United States.

In September 2013, Southern Lord and Dave Grohl released a remixed and remastered version of It's in My Blood, titled Blood!. Following that release, original vocalist Clifford Dinsmore and guitarist Mike Neider recruited bassist Chuck Dukowski and drummer Dave Grohl to a new Blast EP For Those Who've Graced The Fire, which was released on Rise Records. Mike Neider and Clifford Dinsmore have recruited bassist Nick Oliveri and drummer Joey Castillo to a new Blast lineup, with plans to tour and record new material.

== Discography ==
=== Studio albums ===
- The Power of Expression (1986)
- It's in My Blood (1987)
- Take The Manic Ride (1989)
- Blood! (2013)
- The Expression of Power (2014)
- Manic Ride (2023)

=== EPs and singles ===
- For Those Who've Graced the Fire (2015)
- BL'AST! / eyehategod split (2016)

=== Demos ===
- Bad Medication (1989)
- Whirlwind (1991)
