= Tar Babies =

- Origin: Madison, Wisconsin, United States
- Genres: Punk rock, hardcore punk, noise punk, funk rock
- Years active: 1982–1989
- Labels: Lexicon Devil, SST Records
- Past members: Bucky Pope; Robin Davies; Dan Bitney; Jeremy Davies; Steve Lewis

Tar Babies was an American band from Madison, Wisconsin, United States, that released several albums on SST Records. Critic Steve Huey of Allmusic describes them as a minor player on SST, with an intriguing sound rooted in hardcore punk but touching on "bits of psychedelia, jazz, and avant-noise skronk" and open-ended jamming reminiscent of George Clinton's P-Funk groups.

== Biography ==
The Tar Babies formed in the early 1980s. The original line up was Bucky Pope (guitar), Jeremy Davies (vocals), Robin Davies (bass), and Dan Bitney (drums). Jeremy Davies and Dan Bitney had previously played in the hardcore band Mecht Mensch (where Bitney played guitar and Davies played bass), while Bucky Pope and Robin Davies had been members of the Bloody Mattresses. This line up recorded 1983's "Face The Music" and 1985's "Respect Your Nightmares", both of which were released on their own Bone Air Records and were compiled from sessions produced by Butch Vig and Bob Mould. In 1987, the group recorded "Fried Milk", their first release for SST Records. By this time, Jeremy Davies had left the band and vocals were handled by Bucky, Dan and Robin. 1988's "No Contest" and 1989's "Honey Bubble" showed an increasing funk influence and included Tony Jarvis on saxophone. Robin Davies left the group between the two albums and was replaced by Steve Lewis. The Tar Babies split after "Honey Bubble" but in 1992 Pope, Bitney, and Lewis regrouped with 2nd guitarist Bobby Vienneau released "Death Trip" on the German label Sonic Noise. They split for good afterwards.

Robin Davies and Dan Bitney played in Chicago/Madison band Booty Froot in the 1990s with keyboardist Jeremy Jacobsen. In the early 2000s, Bucky Pope and Robin Davies reunited under the moniker the Bar Tabbies. Dan Bitney has been a longtime member of Chicago's Tortoise. Bucky Pope also recorded and performed (circa 2014) in Negative Example, his current act is known as the Mothballs.

== Discography ==
- Face The Music 12" EP (Bone Air, 1983)
- Respect Your Nightmares 12" EP (Bone Air, 1985)
- Fried Milk LP (SST Records, 1987)
- No Contest LP (SST Records, 1988)
- Honey Bubble LP (SST Records, 1989)
- Death Trip LP (Sonic Noise, 1992)
- Face The Music/Respect Your Nightmares CD compilation (Lexicon Devil, 2005)

== Members ==
=== Final Line Up ===
- Bucky Pope - Vocals, Guitar
- Bobby Vienneau - Guitar
- Steve Lewis - Bass
- Dan Bitney - Drums

=== Former Members ===
- Jeremy Davies - Vocals
- Robin Davies - Bass, Vocals
- Tony Jarvis - Saxophone
