= Würm (band) =

American sludge metal band

- Origin: Hermosa Beach, California
- Genres: Hardcore punk • Heavy metal • Sludge metal • Post-hardcore
- Years active: 1972-1978, 1982-1983
- Labels: SST Records, Org Music
- Past members: Chuck Dukowski; Ed Danky; Lou Hinzo; Simon Smallwood

Würm was a hardcore punk band formed in 1972 by bass player Chuck Dukowski, who would later join Black Flag. They released one LP on Greg Ginn's SST Records and some tracks on compilations. They were active from 1972 to 1978 and from 1982 to 1983.

== History ==
Würm began in Hermosa Beach in 1972 when Gary McDaniel, who would later be known as Chuck Dukowski, and guitar player Ed Danky decided to start a band. They shared the vocal duties and came up with the name Würm in 1974. They played parties and went on tour.

At the Würmhole, their practice place, they became friends with Keith Morris and Greg Ginn of the band Panic, who became regulars at the Würmhole parties before beginning to live there and practice there too. Lou Hinzo (Loud Lou) joined the band after answering an ad looking for an animalistic drummer. Würm also made money by buying and selling musical equipment.

Würm recorded an album in 1977 but the tapes were scrapped after the studio wasn't paid. That event, health problems among band members, and their growing dislike for each other caused Würm to split. One year later, Panic changed its name to Black Flag to avoid confusion with another band of the same name and Gary, who had joined Panic, rechristened himself Chuck the Duke or Chuck Dukowski.

During a Black Flag hiatus, in 1982, Chuck brought back Würm to release a 3-song 7", We're Off/I'm Dead/Time has come Today on SST Records. They again reunited in 1983, adding vocalist Simon Smallwood of the band Dead Hippie. This line up recorded the Feast LP, but split for good during the recording. The LP wasn't released until 1985 on SST Records.

After Würm, Ed Danky played in the bands Reign of Terror, Powertrip and The Mentors before dying of a cocaine overdose in 1991 and Loud Lou also played in bands with Ed Danky (The Mentors and Reign of Terror). Loud Lou performed with his band Lou's Crew, Tobacco Road and Kyndryd, formally No Boundaries, and drumming for the Oklahoma Ollie Blues Stand Band and The Deacon Jones Blues Band. Simon Smallwood played vocals acts for TuTu Band before dying from presumably alcohol poisoning in 2006. Danky and Dukowski also wrote the song "Modern Man" which appeared on Black Flag's 1985 Loose Nut LP.

In 2018, Org Music released a compilation double album entitled Exhumed which consists of Feast along with unreleased tracks and demos. In January 2020, the band reunited to play a show to benefit music education at Castelar Elementary school. After reuniting, the band recorded new material for a 7" single, "Poison" b/w "Zero Sum", which was released in September 2020 for Record Store Day.

== Members ==
- Chuck Dukowski - Bass, Vocals
- Ed Danky - Guitar, Vocals
- Loud Lou Hinzo - Drums
- Simon Smallwood - Vocals

== Discography ==
Albums

- Feast LP (SST Records, 1985)

Singles

- "We're Off" b/w "I'm Dead/Time Has Come Today" 7" (SST Records, 1982)
- "Poison" b/w "Zero Sum" 7" (Org Music, 2020)

Compilations

- The Blasting Concept LP (SST Records, 1983) - features the track "I'm Dead"
- The Sound of Hollywood 3-Copulation LP (Mystic Records, 1984) - features the track "I'm Taking Over"
- Program: Annihilator CS (SST Records, 1986) - features the tracks "Feast" and "Bad Habit"
- The 7 Inch Wonders of the World CS (SST Records, 1986) - features the tracks "We're Off", "I'm Dead" and "Time Has Come Today"
- The Blasting Concept Volume II LP (SST Records, 1986) - features the track "Death Ride"
- Exhumed 2XLP (Org Music, 2018)
