= DC3 (band) =

American rock and roll band

DC3 (also known as D.C. 3) was an American rock and roll band formed by singer, songwriter and guitarist Dez Cadena in 1983 and active until 1989.

Cadena was a member of California-based punk rock group Black Flag from 1980 to 1983, first as vocalist then as rhythm guitarist.

After leaving Black Flag, Cadena formed DC3 with drummer Kurt Markham and bassist Kira Roessler. Cadena cited his time in Black Flag as teaching him how to sing and play guitar at the same time, contributing to his decision to take a dual role as both vocalist and guitarist in DC3. Kira practiced with the band before leaving to join Black Flag, being replaced by her older brother Paul Roessler from Los Angeles band The Screamers, who would play bass and keyboards.

DC3 did some early tours with Black Flag, but by 1984 had moved past Black Flag's hardcore punk sound. DC3's debut album, This Is The Dream, was released in 1985 on SST Records and featured a significant Black Sabbath influence. Cadena said DC3 "tried to denounce punk by jamming long solos," citing Deep Purple and Mountain as further influences. Early versions of the songs "I Believe It" and "Ain't No Time Here Now" were recorded by Black Flag on the band's 1982 Demos.

Despite the name "DC3", bassist Ceasar Viscarra and drummer Louie Dufau, both formerly of The Stains, joined Cadena and Roessler after the release of the first album, turning the band into a quartet until their break-up in 1989.

DC3 reduced the Black Sabbath influence on later albums, but the band maintained a 1970s hard rock sound. The band's two follow-up releases, The Good Hex and You're Only As Blind As Your Mind Can Be, were both released in 1986 on SST Records. DC3 also recorded a cover of the Jack Bruce/Mountain song "Theme for an Imaginary Western" for the 1986 SST compilation The Blasting Concept Volume II.

A collection of live recordings, titled Vida, was released in 1989 after the break-up of the band.

== Discography ==
- This Is The Dream LP (SST Records, 1985)
- The Good Hex LP (SST Records, 1986)
- You're Only As Blind As Your Mind Can Be LP (SST Records, 1986)
- Vida 2xLP/CD (SST Records, 1989)

== Members ==
=== Final line-up ===
- Dez Cadena - Vocals, Guitar
- Paul Roessler - Keyboards, Vocals
- Ceasar Viscarra - Bass
- Louie Dufau - Drums

=== Previous members ===
- Kurt Markham - Drums on This Is The Dream
- Kira Roessler - Bass (early practices)
