= Bazooka (band) =

American band

- Origin: Southern California, United States
- Genres: punk jazz
- Years active: Early 1990s
- Label: SST Records
- Past members: Vince Meghrouni; Bill Crawford; Tony Atherton; Don Carroll; Jeremy Keller; Steve Reed

Bazooka was an American musical band active in the early 1990s, led by saxophonist Tony Atherton, bass guitarist Bill Crawford and drummer Vince Meghrouni. Their music could be broadly classified as jazz, but also touched on other styles. All their albums were released by SST Records.

The first line-up was Meghrouni, Crawford and Atherton. This lineup of Bazooka record three albums: Perfectly Square, Blowhole, and Cigars, Oyster and Booze.

Before their recordings for the SST label, Bazooka made a cassette tape for sale at live gigs. Many of the songs appeared on their later albums, and were probably sketches at the time in development. It was recorded in Los Angeles with the musicians were listed as, Tony Atherton; Tactical Assault Commander, Bill Crawford; Chief of Strategic Operations, and Vince Meghrouni; Minister of Bombardment. Tenor sax player Tony Atherton was known to play two saxes at one time, the other being an alto sax. They were at this time appearing in small cafe-bars at Long Beach, California.

Songwriting was split about evenly between the trio's members, with a healthy dose of jazz standards written by the likes of Thelonious Monk, Sonny Rollins and Lee Morgan. The music was generally in a bebop or hard bop vein, although a few pieces were freely improvised, and there was a strong punk rock or hard rock quality, particularly in Crawford's playing.

In his review of 1994's Blowhole, Richard Foss wrote, "It is difficult to articulate just what makes Bazooka such an interesting band and Blowhole such a fine album. There are other bands that play jazz with rock fervor and wild abandon, but few who do so with anything approaching this level of pure musicianship."
