= Lawndale (band) =

- Origin: Lawndale, California, USA
- Genres: Surf rock, alternative rock, instrumental rock, psychedelic rock
- Years active: 1984-1988, 1997-Present
- Labels: SST Records, Sunspot Records
- Members: Jack Skelley; Joe Baiza; Dave Childs; Philo Van Duyne
- Past members: Rick Lawndale; Mark Hoeschler; Steve Housden

Lawndale is an instrumental rock band from Lawndale, California, whose music touches on alternative surf rock and psychedelic rock. The band was started in 1984 by Steve Housden, Rick Waddell, AKA Rick Lawndale, and Jack Skelley, who both played guitar and bass guitar. The band released two records on SST Records and some tracks on compilations.

They formed in 1984 and split in 1987 but Rick Lawndale started up again in 1997 under the moniker Rick Lawndale Band with other musicians. Now, Lawndale (minus Waddell) and the Rick Lawndale band are both back together and playing shows. The L.A. Weekly described Lawndale as "The Ventures meet Led Zeppelin in Don Knotts' living room"

== History ==
Guitar player, songwriter and vocalist Rick Waddell started his career as a solo acoustic performer in the 1980s and formed the psychedelic all-instrumental surf rock band Lawndale in 1984 with guitar/bass players Jack Skelley and Steve Housden as well as drummer Dave Childs. They named the band Lawndale after the Californian city in which they lived, which Waddell also used as a last name instead of his real last name. They played original compositions as well as some instrumental covers to which they added modern tones, like "Take Five" from the Dave Brubeck Quartet including the bridge for "Whole Lotta Love" or Duke Ellington's "Caravan" mixed with Pink Floyd's "Interstellar Overdrive".

They were soon signed by Greg Ginn's SST Records, which headquarters were in Lawndale. The signing was part of SST's efforts to expand its scope beyond punk rock and hardcore. They released two albums, Beyond Barbecue (which was first planned for release on Iridescence Records) in 1986 and Sasquatch Rock in 1987, which featured Ginn on the song "March of the Melted Army Men. They also appeared on three SST Records compilations during that period and two New Alliance Records compilations after they split in 1987.

The band split in 1988 and sporadically reunited to play some shows and write new material that was never released. In 1997, Waddell decided he still wanted to make music and started The Rick Lawndale Band with guitar player Ricky Sepulveda (from the band Nervous Gender, bass player Richard Derrick and drummer Paul Smith. The band was no longer all instrumental as Rick sang besides playing guitar.

In 1998, Smith and Derrick quit to be replaced by Dave Rodriguez from The Surf Raiders and The Sultans of Surf on drums and Rommel Dones from No Dice and Whiskey Imperials on bass and vocals. The band started to record demos with that line-up. Dones also quit in 2001 to be replaced by bass player Marcel Loera of The Vindicators and the band finished working on the demos that eventually became the Surfabilly Rock album, released in 2002 on Sunspot Records.

In 2006, lead guitar player Ricky Sepulveda was replaced by Paul Feldman. Lawndale played an unannounced reunion show with all original members in 2006, with The Rick Lawndale Band and Saccharine Trust also on the bill and the Lawndale guys decided to continue without Waddell after that show, adding Mark Hoeschler (The Bomboras, Boardwalkers, Revellators) on guitar and bass. The Rick Lawndale band started working on a new CD in 2008.

== Other ventures ==
Music from Surfabilly Rock was used on The Real World, Road Rules and Extreme Challenge on MTV in 2003. In 2005, Rick Lawndale did the soundtrack of the film A Happy Ending with composer Rick Bazilibavo.

== Members ==
=== Lawndale ===
- Jack Skelley- Guitar, Bass (1984–1988, 2006–Present)
- Philo Van Duyne (2017-Present) - Bass
- Joe Baiza (2021-Present) - Guitar
- Dave Childs - Drums (1984–1988, 2006–Present)

---Previous Members---

- Steve Housden - Guitar, Bass (1984–1988, 2006–2021)
- Mark Hoeschler - Guitar, Bass (2009–2017)
- Rick Waddell AKA Rick Lawndale - Guitar, Bass (1984–1988, 2006)

=== The Rick Lawndale band ===
- Rick Waddell AKA Rick Lawndale - Guitar, Vocals (1997–Present)
- Paul Feldman - Guitar (2006–Present)
- Marcel Loera - Bass (2001–Present)
- Dave Rodriguez - Drums (1998–Present)
- Ricky Sepulveda - Guitar (1997–2006)
- Rommel Dones - Bass, Vocals (1998–2001)
- Richard Derrick - Bass (1997–1998)
- Paul Smith - Drums (1997–1998)

== Discography ==
=== Lawndale ===
- Albums
  - Beyond Barbecue (LP, SST Records, 1986)
  - Sasquatch Rock (LP, SST Records, 1987)
- Compilations
  - Lovedolls Superstar (LP, SST Records, 1986) - features the track "Wingtips"
  - No Age: A compilation of SST Instrumental Music (LP, SST Records, 1987) - features the tracks "March of the Melted Army Men" and "Days of Pup and Tacos"
  - SST Godhead Storedude In-Store Play Device #3 (LP, SST Records, 1987) - features the tracks "March of the Melted Army Men" and "Sasquatch Rock"
  - Taste Test #1 (LP, New Alliance Records, 1989) - features the track "Sasquatch Rock"

=== The Rick Lawndale Band ===
- Albums
  - Surfabilly Rock (LP, Sunspot Records, 2002)
