= Chuck Dukowski =

American musician (born 1954)

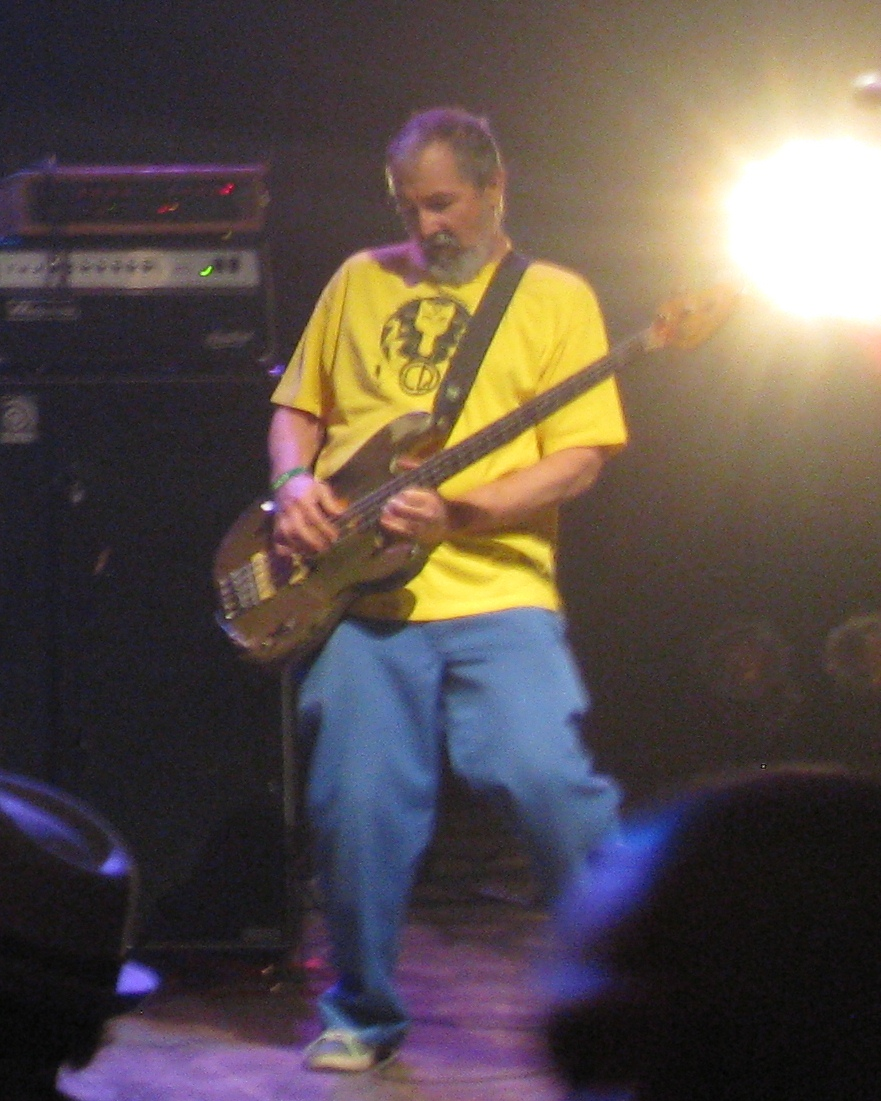
- Chuck Dukowski performing with the band FLAG in 2013

Background information
- Born: Gary Arthur McDaniel; February 1, 1954 (age 72); Los Angeles County, California, US
- Origin: San Pedro, Los Angeles, California, U.S.
- Genres: Hardcore punk, punk rock
- Occupations: Musician, songwriter
- Instruments: Bass, guitar, vocals
- Years active: 1973–present

Gary Arthur McDaniel (born February 1, 1954), known by his stage name Chuck Dukowski, is an American punk rock musician. He is best known for being the bass player and an occasional songwriter for Black Flag.

== Early life ==
Gary Arthur McDaniel was born on February 1, 1954 in Los Angeles County, California to an American father and German mother. McDaniel spent the first few years of his life living in Germany, before his family eventually moved back to Southern California. The family would first reside in the Holly Park neighborhood in Los Angeles, before settling in San Pedro. McDaniel was raised in a self-described middle-class family in San Pedro, where his father worked for the industrial company TRW, though McDaniel would temporarily move back to Germany with his family while his father worked on the Telstar satellite project, where he attended a year of elementary school.

Dukowski attended San Pedro High School and later Chadwick School, where he played football. After graduation, he went to college to study psychobiology.

== Career ==
=== Würm ===
Dukowski's first band was Würm, which started in 1973. By 1977, the band had moved to Hermosa Beach and lived in a communal house called "the Würmhole" but Würm broke up later that year.

=== Black Flag ===
Keith Morris and Greg Ginn were regulars at Würmhole parties. in 1977, Dukowski joined Morris and Ginn's band, Panic, before they played their first show. Panic changed their name to Black Flag after discovering another band using the name "Panic". Dukowski left the band in 1983 before the recording of My War, and afterward served as Black Flag's manager. He was responsible for booking nationwide and worldwide tours until 1986. Dukowski wrote or co-wrote some of Black Flag's most popular songs, including "My War," "The Bars," "I Love You," and "Modern Man". Dukowski started SST Records with Ginn in 1978 and was a co-owner until 1989. During Black Flag's appearance in The Decline of Western Civilization, he is credited as Gary McDaniel.

=== Later projects ===
After Black Flag, Dukowski reformed Würm, which continued until guitarist Ed Danky died. Other bands Dukowski formed include SST "supergroup" October Faction, and SWA, formed in 1985 with Merrill Ward of Overkill.

Dukowski has a new band with his wife, artist and musician Lora Norton, and son Milo called The Chuck Dukowski Sextet. They released their debut album, Eat My Life, on Dukowski's own Nice & Friendly Records in 2006. In 2013 Chuck launched Flag with former Black Flag members Keith Morris, Bill Stevenson, Dez Cadena, and Descendents/All guitarist Stephen Egerton to perform the music of Black Flag.

He appeared in the documentaries The Decline of Western Civilization, Open Your Mouth And Say... Mr. Chi Pig, We Jam Econo, Urban Struggle: The Battle of the Cuckoo's Nest, and We Were Feared (Clockwork Orange County).

=== FLAG ===
FLAG
- Genres: Hardcore punk; Cover
- Years active: 2013–present
- Spinoff of: Black Flag, Descendents
- Members: Keith Morris; Chuck Dukowski; Dez Cadena; Bill Stevenson; Stephen Egerton

In 2013, Keith Morris, Chuck Dukowski, Dez Cadena, Bill Stevenson, and Descendents member Stephen Egerton created FLAG as an offshoot of Black Flag. As of 2013, they are only touring. No plans for an album have been announced.

== Stage name ==
"Chuck Dukowski" is a stage name, originating from a Zippo lighter with "Chuck the Duke" inscribed on it that he found while searching for change. Feeling that the name "Chuck the Duke" sounded macho, he wanted to add a Polish sounding last name, as Poles were frequently picked on. He turned "Chuck the Duke" into "Chuck Dukowski". Dukowski was credited under his real name on original pressings of Black Flag's Nervous Breakdown EP, as well as in the documentary film The Decline of Western Civilization and its companion soundtrack album. He is credited as "Charles Dukowski" on Black Flag's Damaged LP.

== Discography ==
=== Black Flag ===
- Nervous Breakdown EP (1979) – bass
- Jealous Again EP (1980) – bass/vocals
- "Louie Louie" single (1981) – bass
- Six Pack EP (1981) – bass
- Damaged LP (1981) – bass
- TV Party EP (1982) – bass
- Everything Went Black double LP (1983) – bass
- Slip It In LP (1984) – guest backing vocals

=== SWA ===
- Your Future (If You Have One) (1985) – bass
- Sex Dr. (1986) – bass
- XCIII (1987) – bass
- Evolution 85–87 (1988) – bass
- Winter (1989) – bass
- Volume (1991) – bass/vocals

=== Chuck Dukowski Sextet ===
- Eat My Life (2006) – bass/guitars
- Reverse the Polarity (2007) – bass
- Haunted (2012) – bass

=== Other ===
- Wurm – I'm Dead EP (1982) – bass/vocals
- Wurm – Feast LP (1985) – bass
- October Faction – October Faction (1985) – bass/vocals
- October Faction – Second Factionalization (1986) – bass/vocals
- Chuck Dukowski/Paul Cutler/Bill Stinson – United Gang Members CD (1994) – bass/vocals
- Black Face – "I Want to Kill You / Monster" 7" (2011)
- Bl'ast – For Those Who've Graced The Fire! single (2015) – bass (as guest)
