= Black Flag (band) =

American hardcore punk band

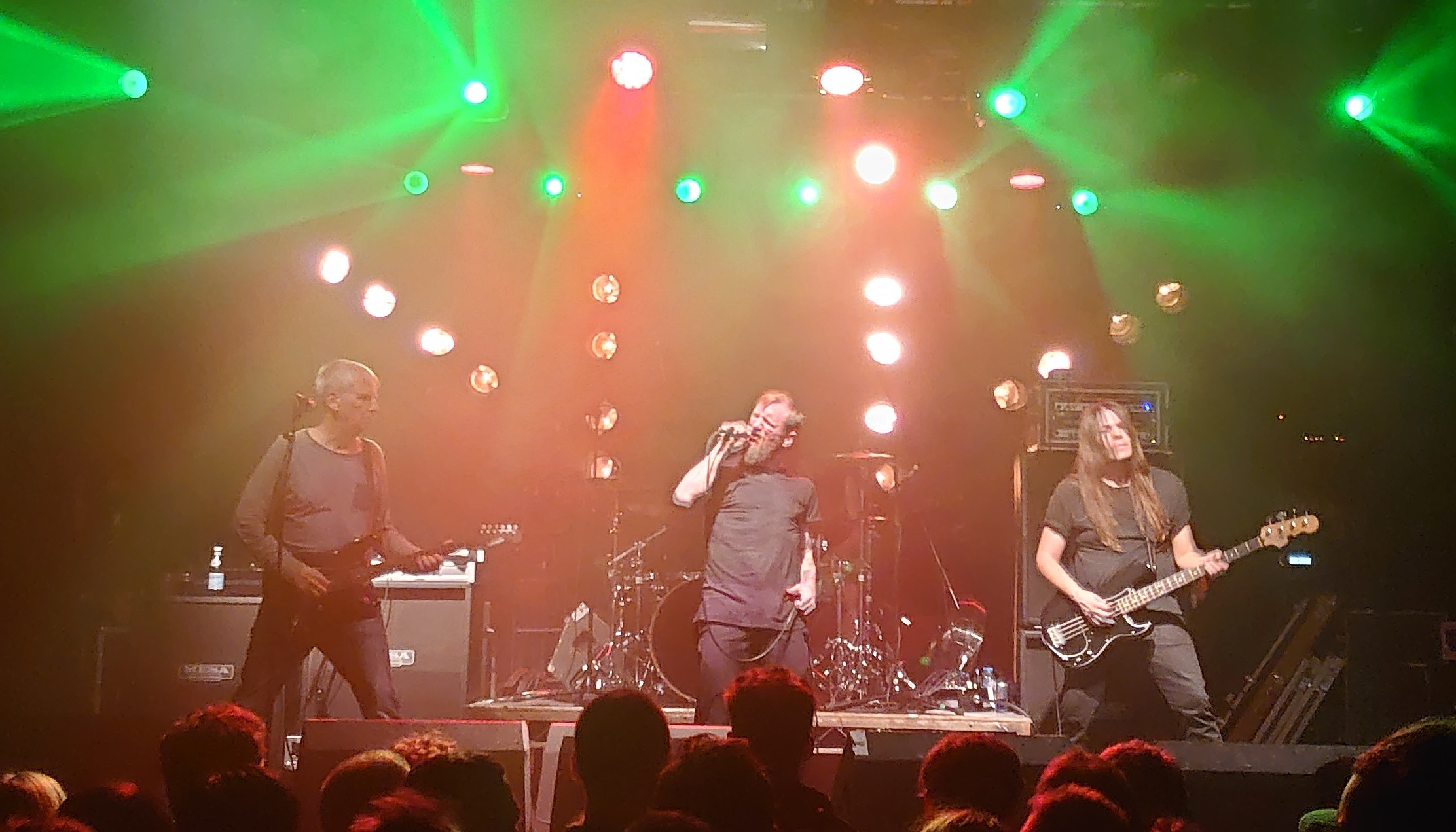
- Black Flag performing at the Electric Ballroom in Camden 2019

Background information
- Also known as: Panic (1976–1978)
- Origin: Hermosa Beach, California, U.S.
- Genres: Hardcore punk; punk rock; post-hardcore; heavy metal
- Works: Discography
- Years active: Black Flag: 1976–1986; 2003; 2013–2014; 2019–present; FLAG: 2011; 2013–present
- Label: SST
- Spinoffs: The Chuck Dukowski Sextet; Circle Jerks; Dos; Gone; October Faction; Off!; Mojack; Rollins Band; FLAG
- Members: Black Flag: Greg Ginn; Max Zanelly; David Rodriguez; Bryce Weston FLAG; Keith Morris; Chuck Dukowski; Dez Cadena; Bill Stevenson; Stephen Egerton
- Past members: Raymond Pettibon; Jim "Kansas" Dearman; Glenn "Spot" Lockett; Ron Reyes; Henry Rollins; Brian Migdol; Robo; Emil Johnson; Chuck Biscuits; Kira Roessler; Anthony Martinez; C'el Revuelta; Mike Vallely; Charles Wiley; Dave Klein; Harley Duggan; Austin Sears; Gregory Moore; Tyler Smith; Brandon Pertzborn; Joseph Noval; Isaias Gil; Matt Baxter
- Website: blackflagband.com

Black Flag is an American punk rock band formed in 1976 in Hermosa Beach, California. The band was founded as Panic by guitarist Greg Ginn, and singer Keith Morris. They are widely considered to be one of the first hardcore punk bands, as well as one of the pioneers of post-hardcore. After breaking up in 1986, Black Flag reunited in 2003 and again in 2013; however, due to a legal dispute two versions of Black Flag were formed, one under the Black Flag name featuring Ginn and a revolving door of touring musicians and the other, FLAG, featuring Morris, Chuck Dukowski, Bill Stevenson among other ex-Black Flag members. This resulted in a highly public lawsuit between Ginn and FLAG, ultimately ending with both versions to exist and tour. The second Black Flag reunion lasted well over a year, during which they released their first studio album in nearly three decades, What The... (2013). Ginn announced Black Flag's third reunion in January 2019.

Black Flag's sound mixed the raw simplicity of the Ramones with a style of atonal guitar soloing compared to that of the New York Dolls' lead guitarist Johnny Thunders, and, in later years, frequent tempo shifts. The lyrics were written mostly by Ginn, and like other punk bands of the late 1970s and early 1980s, Black Flag voiced an anti-authoritarian and nonconformist message, in songs punctuated with descriptions of social isolation, neurosis, poverty, and paranoia. These themes were explored further when Henry Rollins joined the band as lead singer in 1981. Most of the band's material was released on Ginn's independent record label SST Records.

Over the course of the 1980s, Black Flag's sound, as well as their notoriety, evolved. In addition to being central to the creation of hardcore punk, they were innovators in the first wave of American West Coast punk rock and are considered a key influence on punk subculture in the United States and abroad. Along with being among the earliest punk rock groups to incorporate elements and the influence of heavy metal melodies and rhythm, there were often overt free jazz and contemporary classical elements in their sound, especially in Ginn's guitar playing, and the band interspersed records and performances with instrumentals throughout their career. They also played longer, slower, and more complex songs at a time when other bands in their milieu performed a raw, fast, three-chord format.

== History ==
=== Formation and early years (1976–1981) ===
Initially called Panic, Black Flag was formed in 1976 in Hermosa Beach by Greg Ginn and Keith Morris. Morris originally was to play drums for the band, until Ginn, impressed by his energy and charisma, insisted he be the front man. Ginn and Morris had trouble early on finding bandmates. They had an especially difficult time finding a reliable bass guitarist and often rehearsed without a bassist, a factor that contributed to the development of Ginn's distinctive guitar sound. Ginn's brother Raymond Pettibon and SST house record producer-to-be Spot filled in during rehearsals. In the beginning, Ginn and Morris were inspired by the raw, stripped-down attitude of bands such as the Ramones and the Stooges. Ginn has said "We were influenced by the Stooges and then the Ramones; they inspired us. Keith and myself saw the Ramones when they first toured LA in 1976. After we saw them, I said if they could do it we could do it. I thought Keith would be a good singer and after seeing the Ramones, it made him think that he doesn't have to be some classical operatic singer."

Chuck Dukowski, bassist of Würm, liked Ginn's band and eventually joined, forming a committed quartet with Ginn, Morris and drummer Brian Migdol. Dukowski insisted the band rehearse much more frequently, sometimes seven days per week. The band held their first performance in December 1977 in Redondo Beach, California. To avoid confusion with another band called Panic, they changed their name to Black Flag in late 1978. They played their first show under this name on January 27, 1979, at the Moose Lodge Hall in Redondo Beach, California. Future Black Flag vocalists Dez Cadena and Ron Reyes were both in attendance at the Moose Lodge show.

The name was suggested by Ginn's brother, artist Raymond Pettibon, who also designed the band's logo: a stylized black flag represented as four black bars. Pettibon stated "If a white flag means surrender, a black flag represents anarchy." Their new name was reminiscent of the anarchist symbol, the insecticide of the same name, and of the British heavy metal band Black Sabbath, one of Ginn's favorite bands. Ginn suggested that he was "comfortable with all the implications of the name." The band spray painted the simple, striking logo all over Los Angeles, attracting attention from both supporters and the Los Angeles Police Department. Pettibon designed all of the band's early flyers and album covers through the 1980s.

There were few opportunities for punk rock bands to perform in Southern California (Los Angeles club The Masque was the center of the L.A. punk scene, but was also rather parochial, and did not often admit bands from outside L.A. proper). Black Flag organized their own gigs, performing at picnics, house parties, schools; any place that was available. They called club owners themselves to arrange appearances, and plastered hundreds of flyers—usually Pettibon's severe, haunting comic strip style panels—on any available surface to publicize performances. Dukowski reported that the "minimum [number of flyers] that went out was 500 for a show." Black Flag shows were regularly broken up by the LAPD, often violently, at the direction of Chief of Police Daryl Gates, who targeted punk rock shows in the city.

In 1979, the band released their first recording, the Nervous Breakdown EP. It was the debut release by Ginn's SST Records, which he created due to the band's difficulty in securing a contract with existing labels due to their reputation.

Though Ginn was the band's leader, he was more quiet than Dukowski, whose intelligent, fast-talking, high-energy persona attracted significant attention, and he often served as Black Flag's spokesman to the press. Dukowski acted as the group's tour manager even after he no longer performed with them, and helped establish the band's DIY punk ethic and demanding work ethic. Dukowski's bass guitar was a vital part of the early Black Flag sound; "TV Party", for instance, was one of many songs "driven more by Chuck Dukowski's percolating bass line than Ginn's stun-gun guitar."

Morris performed as vocalist on Black Flag's earliest recordings, and his energized, manic stage presence was pivotal in the band earning a reputation in Southern California. Migdol was replaced by the enigmatic Colombian drummer Robo, whose numerous clicking metallic bracelets became part of his drum sound. The band played with a speed and ferocity that was all but unprecedented in rock music; critic Ira Robbins declared that "Black Flag was, for all intents and purposes, America's first hardcore band." Morris quit in 1979, citing, among other reasons, creative differences with Ginn, and his own "freaking out on cocaine and speed." Morris would subsequently form the Circle Jerks.

After Morris's departure, Black Flag recruited fan Ron Reyes as singer. With Reyes, Black Flag recorded the Jealous Again 12-inch EP and appeared in the film The Decline of Western Civilization. This was also the line-up that toured up and down the West Coast for the first time, the version most fans outside of L.A. first saw.

In 1980, Reyes quit Black Flag mid-performance at the Fleetwood in Redondo Beach because of escalating violence. For the remainder of that gig, the band played an extended version of "Louie Louie" and invited audience members to take turns singing.

Dez Cadena, another fan, then joined as a vocalist, and the band continued touring throughout the United States. By the summer of 1981, Cadena opted to play guitar rather than perform vocals, and the band sought a new singer while on the East Coast of the United States.

=== Rollins era (1981–1986) ===
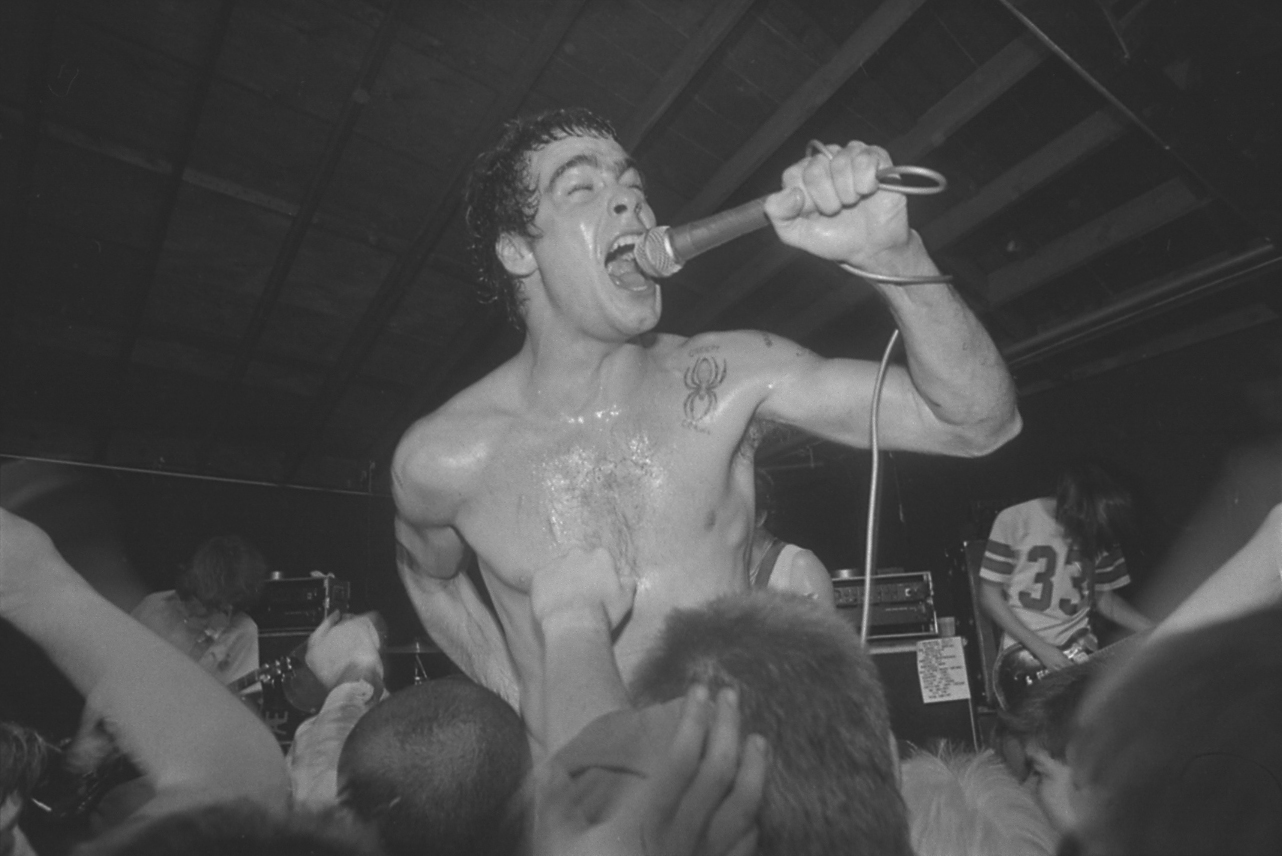
Henry Rollins performing in 1983

Twenty-year-old fan Henry Rollins (birth name Henry Garfield) was then living in Washington, D.C., and singing for hardcore band State of Alert (S.O.A.). S.O.A. drummer Ivor Hanson had a father who was a top admiral in the US Navy, and his family shared living quarters with the vice president of the United States in the United States Naval Observatory. The band held their practices there, and would have to be let in by United States Secret Service agents.

S.O.A. had corresponded with Black Flag, and met them when they performed on the U.S. east coast. At an impromptu show at A7 in New York City, Rollins had asked the band to perform "Clocked In", and the band offered to let him sing. Since vocalist Dez Cadena was switching to guitar, the band then invited Rollins to audition. Impressed by his stage demeanor, they asked him to become their permanent vocalist. Despite some doubts, he accepted, due in part to Ian MacKaye's encouragement. Rollins acted as roadie for the remainder of the tour while learning Black Flag's songs during sound checks and encores, while Cadena crafted guitar parts that meshed with Ginn's. Rollins also impressed Black Flag with his broad musical interests during an era when punk rock music and fans were increasingly factionalized; he introduced Black Flag to Washington D.C.'s go-go, a distinctive take on funk music.

Rollins was Black Flag's longest-lasting vocalist. When he joined Black Flag, he brought a different attitude and perspective than previous singers. Some earlier songs, such as "Six Pack" (a song written about original singer Keith Morris) blended a sense of black humor with driving punk rock. Rollins was an intense performer, who usually appeared onstage wearing only shorts. Ginn once stated that after Rollins joined, "We couldn't do songs with a sense of humor anymore; he got into the serious way-out poet thing."

With Rollins, Black Flag began work on their first full-length album, Damaged. The sessions for the album (chronicled in Michael Azerrad's book Our Band Could Be Your Life) were a source of conflict between the band and engineer/producer Spot, who had worked with the band and the SST label since their early years. Spot had already recorded many of the Damaged tracks with Dez Cadena on vocals (as well as Keith Morris and Ron Reyes) and felt that the band's sound was ruined with the two guitar line-up (these versions can be heard on the albums Everything Went Black and The First Four Years). Whereas the earlier four-piece versions are more focused and much cleaner sounding, the Damaged recordings are more akin to a live recording, with little stereo separation of guitars, and somewhat muddy. When asked about the lo-fidelity production, Spot has said "They wanted it to sound that way." As such, Damaged is generally regarded as Black Flag's most focused recording, as well as its most iconic. One critic has written that Damaged was "perhaps the best album to emerge from the quagmire that was early-'80s California punk ... the visceral, intensely physical presence of Damaged has yet to be equaled, although many bands have tried." Damaged was released in 1981, and the group began an extensive tour in support of it, forging an independent network for touring independent music acts that would form a cornerstone of the independent music scene for the decade to come.

The previous year 1980 saw the U.S. punk rock movement hitting a peak in popularity. With Damaged and their growing reputation as an impressive live band, Black Flag seemed poised on the cusp of a commercial breakthrough. The record was to be distributed by now-defunct Unicorn Records, a subsidiary of MCA. Trouble began when MCA refused to handle Damaged after MCA executive Al Bergamo determined the album was an "Anti-Parent" record. However, according to longtime SST employee Joe Carducci the "Anti-Parent" statement was not the real reason for MCA's refusing to distribute Damaged; Carducci reported that Unicorn Records was so poorly managed and so deeply in debt that MCA stood to lose money by distributing the album, regardless of its content. This was the beginning of a legal dispute that would, for several years, disallow Black Flag from using their own name on any record after Damaged was released on SST Records and a copy of the "Anti-Parent" statement was placed on the album's cover.

With their new singer, Black Flag and the Minutemen made their first tour of the UK through late 1981 and early 1982. During that tour, the band met punk icon Richard Hell and opened a concert for him. Rollins later published his diaries from that tour in his book Get in the Van. As the front man, Rollins was a frequent target of violent audience members, and started getting involved in fist-fights. Rollins developed a distinct showmanship on stage, where he could entertain an audience just by talking to them. The rest of the band were targets too, with Greg Ginn getting hit by a thrown bullet shell while playing in Colwyn Bay.

As Black Flag was about to return home, UK customs detained Colombian drummer Robo due to visa problems, and he was not able to return with the rest of the band. This would be the end of his tenure with the band (he was able to eventually re-enter the United States in mid-1982, at which point he would promptly join the Misfits as one of that band's last drummers before its 1983 breakup). The loss of Robo put an end to extensive touring for a while. Emil Johnson of Twisted Roots filled in for one tour, but it was clear he was only temporary.

While on that tour in Vancouver, the band found out that drummer Chuck Biscuits was leaving D.O.A. He was quickly drafted on board, traveling with the band for the rest of the tour (cut short because of Henry Rollins' injured knee) to learn the songs. This lineup recorded the later-bootlegged cassette 1982 Demos, showing the direction the band would go in for the My War album.

However, due to personality conflicts—in Get in the Van, Rollins described Biscuits as a "fuck up"—and the Unicorn court injunction-forced inactivity of Black Flag, Biscuits left to join their rivals the Circle Jerks. (Later, Biscuits joined ex-Misfits singer Glenn Danzig's solo project Danzig). Black Flag eventually got Bill Stevenson of Descendents to join permanently (he had filled in from time-to-time before). While the Unicorn Records court injunction prevented the group from releasing a new studio album, they nonetheless continued to work on new material, and embarked on a period which would mark a pronounced change in the group's direction.

The band had also become increasingly interested in music other than punk rock, such as the Jimi Hendrix Experience, and some of the members (particularly Ginn) used cannabis. Newer material (which can be heard on the 1982 Demos bootleg) was slower and less like typical punk music, with classic rock and blues influences seeping in. Cadena left in April 1983 to form his own band DC3. He would take some of the new songs he had written for Black Flag with him and record them for DC3's debut album.

Additionally, by late 1983, Dukowski had retired from performing with Black Flag (some accounts report he was "edged out" by Ginn); Azerrad reports that Ginn was dissatisfied with Dukowski's failure to progress as an instrumentalist, and made things difficult for Dukowski in an attempt to make him quit, but in the end, Rollins took it on himself to fire Dukowski. However, a few of Dukowski's songs were featured on later albums, and he continued acting in his capacity as tour manager.

1983 found Black Flag with fresh songs and a new direction, but without a bass player, and embroiled in a legal dispute over distribution due to SST's issuing Damaged (Ginn argued that since MCA was no longer involved, the Unicorn deal was not legally binding, while Unicorn disagreed and sued SST and Black Flag). Until the matter was sorted out, the band were prevented by a court injunction from using the name "Black Flag" on any recordings. They released a compilation record, Everything Went Black, which was credited to the individual musicians, not "Black Flag". In fact, wherever the original album artwork had the words "Black Flag", they had been covered up with small slips of paper, thus adhering to the letter of the law.

After Unicorn Records declared bankruptcy, Black Flag were released from the injunction, and returned with a vengeance, starting with the release of My War. The album was both a continuation of Damaged, and a vast leap forward. While the general mood and lyrics continue in the confrontational and emotional tone of Damaged, the album would prove influential to grunge music as the decade progressed. Lacking a bass player, Ginn played bass guitar, using the pseudonym Dale Nixon. On the May 1, 2007 episode of his radio program Harmony in My Head, Rollins reported that one of Ginn's favorite albums during this era was Mahavishnu Orchestra's Birds of Fire (1973), and opined that John McLaughlin's guitar work influenced Ginn.

Freed legally to release albums, Black Flag was re-energized and ready to continue full steam ahead. The band recruited bassist Kira Roessler (sister of punk keyboardist Paul Roessler, of 45 Grave) to replace Dukowski, and began its most prolific period.

1984 saw Black Flag (and the SST label) at their most ambitious. This year they would release three full-length albums, and toured nearly constantly, with Rollins noting 178 performances for the year, and about that many for 1985. With Dukowski gone, Ginn ceded much of the spotlight to Rollins, who had expressed some discomfort over being the group's de facto spokesman, while Ginn was the recognized leader (Ginn wrote the majority of the group's songs and lyrics).

With Roessler on board, Black Flag began earnest experimentation, sometimes to critical and audience disdain: One critic writes that Slip It In "blurs the line between moronic punk and moronic metal"; another writes My War is "a pretentious mess of a record with a totally worthless second side." Rollins reports that Black Flag's set-lists in this era rarely included older crowd favorites like "Six Pack" or "Nervous Breakdown", and that audiences were often irritated by the new, slower Black Flag. Violence against the band (and especially Rollins) was ever-present, although the vocalist was now an avid weight lifter, and more than able to defend himself. Furthermore, to Rollins' chagrin, Ginn's interest in marijuana steadily increased; as Rollins put it, "By '86 it was 'Cannot separate the man from his Anvil case with a big-ass stash.'" Despite the initial resistance to the new music and quasi-psychedelic direction, My War would later be cited as a formative influence on the grunge, stoner and sludge metal genres. The band would continue to evolve toward a more heavy metal sound, with 1985's Loose Nut featuring more polished production.

=== Later period and break up (1985–1986) ===
Despite 1984–85 being the most fruitful period for the band and their record label, Ginn and Rollins would ultimately decide to eject Roessler from Black Flag, citing erratic behavior. It has also been suggested that Ginn's accommodating Roessler's college schedule created tension in the band. Her absence, and the lack of a steady drummer (Stevenson quit and was replaced by Anthony Martinez), contributed to the comparatively weak reputation of the last few Black Flag tours.

By 1986, Black Flag's members had grown tired of the tensions of their relentless touring schedule, infighting, and of living in near-poverty. The band had been together almost a decade, and true commercial success and stability had eluded them. The band's erratic artistic changes were a barrier to their retaining an audience – Ginn was so creatively restless that Black Flag's albums were often very dissimilar. At one point, Rollins apparently said, "Why don't we make a record that was like the last one so people won't always be trying to catch up with what we're doing?" The next album, In My Head, with its powerful bluesy proto-grunge-metal, did seem to finally be a cohesive follow-up to their previous album Loose Nut, but it would be their last.

Black Flag played its final show on June 27, 1986, in Detroit, Michigan. In his book Get in the Van, Rollins wrote that Ginn telephoned him in August 1986: "He told me he was quitting the band. I thought that was strange considering it was his band and all. So in one short phone call, it was all over."

=== Post-Black Flag and reunions (1987–2012) ===
Since Black Flag's break-up, Rollins has had the most visible public profile as a musician, writer, and actor. Most Black Flag members have also remained active in music, especially Ginn, who continued playing with bands such as Gone, October Faction, Screw Radio, and Stevenson, who continued on with the Descendents, All, Only Crime, and the reformed Lemonheads. Kira Roessler continues to record and perform with the band dos, a duet with former husband and Minutemen bassist Mike Watt.

In September 2003, Black Flag played three reunion shows, two at the Hollywood Palladium and one at Alex's Bar in Long Beach, California, to benefit cat rescue organizations (a current passion of Ginn's). The line-up for the shows was Dez Cadena on vocals and guitar, Greg Ginn on guitar, Robo on drums, and C'el Revuelta on bass. Professional skateboarder and singer Mike Vallely also sang all the songs from My War at these shows while Gregory Moore was on drums for the My War set.

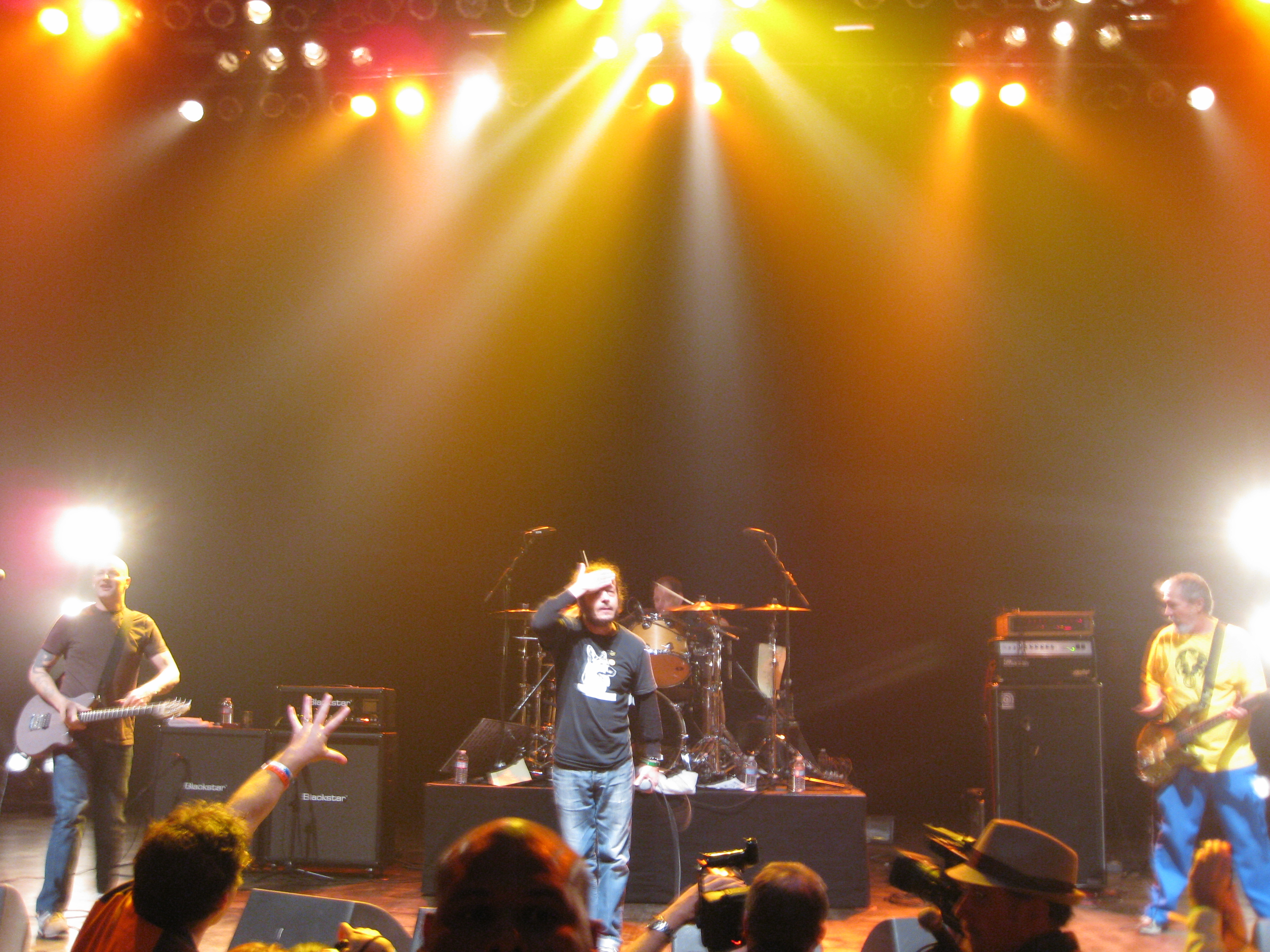
Black Flag in 2011

On July 24, 2010, in celebration of Ron Reyes's 50th birthday, Greg Ginn and Reyes played a set of three Black Flag songs together in addition to his own set with the Ron Reyes Band.

On December 18, 2011, Keith Morris, Chuck Dukowski, Bill Stevenson, and the Descendents' Stephen Egerton played the Nervous Breakdown EP in its entirety for the Goldenvoice 30th anniversary show called GV 30. This surprise gig at the Santa Monica Civic Auditorium took place between sets by the Vandals and the Descendents.

=== Official reformation, FLAG, What The..., and trademark infringement suit (2013–present) ===
On January 25, 2013, it was announced that guitarist Greg Ginn and vocalist Ron Reyes would reform Black Flag, joined by Gregory Moore on drums, and "Dale Nixon" on bass. Dale Nixon is a pseudonym sometimes used by Ginn, most prominently as the bassist on My War. The band would tour as well as release a new album, their first since 1985's In My Head. In March, it was announced that Screeching Weasel bassist Dave Klein had joined the band. On May 2, 2013, the band released a new song entitled "Down in the Dirt" through their website. After releasing two more singles ("The Chase" and "Wallow in Despair"), What The... was released on December 3, and was poorly received by critics and fans.

Around the same time, it was announced that the lineup that played at GV 30 – Morris, Dukowski, Stevenson, and Egerton – would tour performing Black Flag songs, under the legally-distinct moniker of FLAG. It was later announced that the lineup would be joined by Dez Cadena.

On August 2, 2013, SST Records and Greg Ginn brought a trademark infringement action in Los Angeles federal court against Morris, Dukowski, Stevenson, Cadena, and Egerton, with regard to their use of the name Black Flag and the Black Flag logo on the 2013 Flag tour. In the same action, SST and Ginn also sued Henry Rollins and Keith Morris to oppose and cancel the trademark applications filed in September 2012 by Rollins and Morris. SST and Ginn alleged that Rollins and Morris lied to the Patent and Trademark Office on their trademark applications regarding claimed use of the Black Flag name and logo by Rollins and Morris on records, T-shirts, and with regard to live performances.

In October 2013, a federal judge denied the motion for a preliminary injunction, brought by Ginn and SST against Morris, Dukowski, Stevenson, Cadena, and Egerton. The court ruled that it was possible that the logo had fallen into "generic use", but did not rule specifically that it had done so. The court also ruled that Ginn and SST could not prevent the use of the band name "FLAG", as it was likely that fans would know the difference between the two acts, because of widespread publicity.

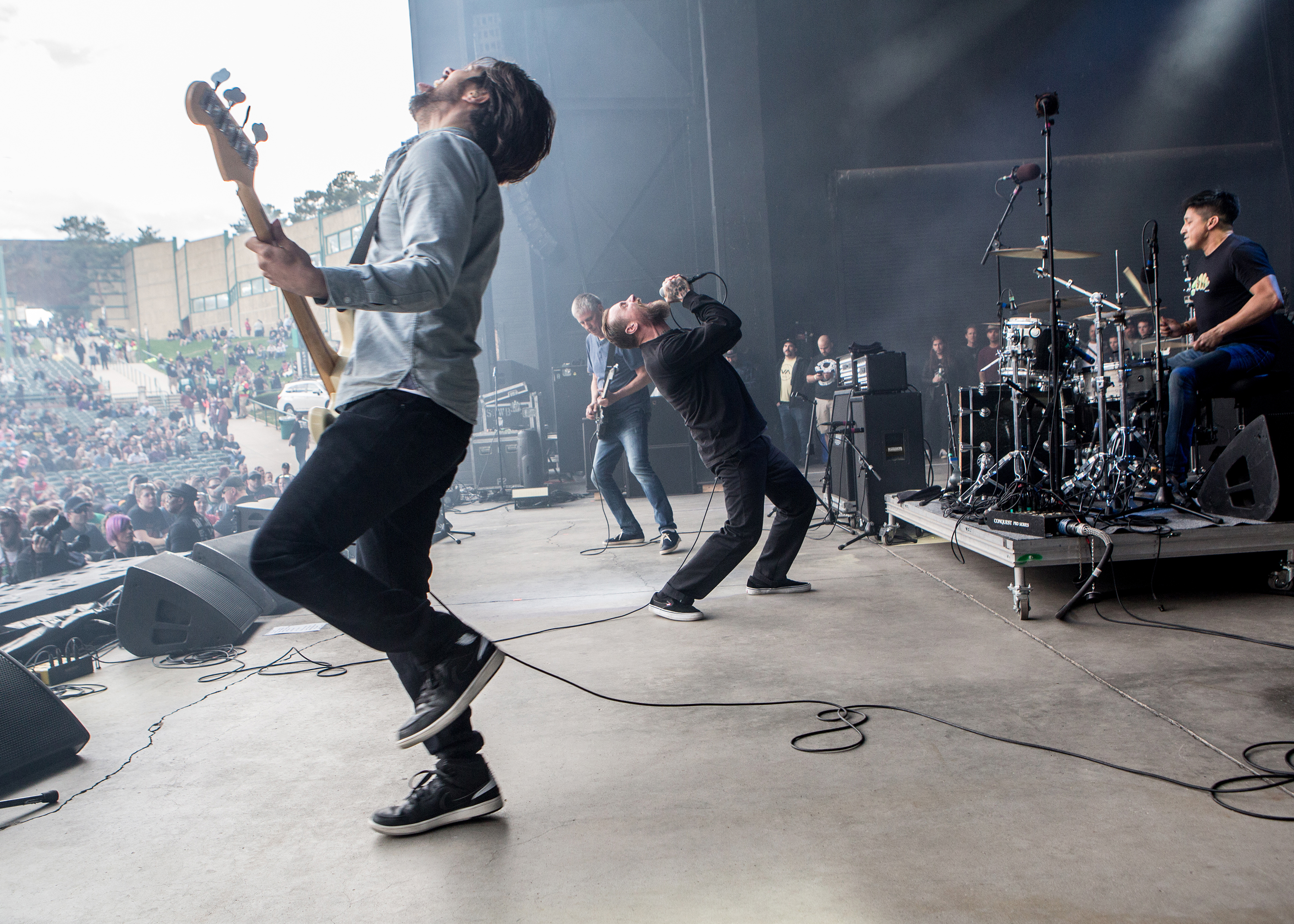
Greg Ginn, Mike Vallely, Tyler Smith, and Isaias Gil performing in Denver, Colorado, 2019

During a show in November 2013 on Black Flag's Australian tour, pro skater and band manager Mike Vallely – who previously sang with the band in 2003 – came on stage and took Reyes' microphone, ousting him from Black Flag and performing the band's last two songs of the set himself. Reyes said he was relieved to be removed from the band, citing difficulties working with Ginn. In January 2014, Vallely was officially named the band's new lead singer. Vallely apologized for the band's antics in 2013, and revealed that the band had begun working on material for a new album with a tour to tentatively begin that May. Shortly after the announcement, Dave Klein announced he too was leaving the band. In 2014, Ginn filled out the line-up with a new rhythm section: Tyler Smith on bass, and Brandon Pertzborn on drums. They embarked upon the Victimology Tour, bringing along Ginn's own HOR and Brooklyn band Cinema Cinema as openers. Ginn dissolved Black Flag again following the conclusion of the tour.

On January 28, 2019, it was announced that Black Flag would play their first show in five years at the Sabroso Craft Beer, Taco & Music Festival in Dana Point, California, on April 7. The show would be the start of a U.S. tour. The band's first U.K. tour in 35 years was set to follow in October. The returning members from the 2014 line-up – Ginn, Vallely, and Smith – were joined by new drummer Isaias Gil. On December 10, 2022, Black Flag announced that they would be touring North America, in which they performed their second studio album My War in its entirety.

At a gig in Garden Grove a day before the No Values Festival in Pomona, California, Black Flag played a show featuring new bass player Matt Baxter, who Mike Vallely had released a folk single called "Sooner or Later" with in 2020 as a duo called The Morning Trail on which Baxter player guitar and Vallely sang. Matt Baxter replaced previous bass player Harley Duggan. This line-up would return to Australia the following year, performing at the Dark Mofo festival in Hobart, Tasmania.

Following a series of North American shows in January 2025, Vallely quit Black Flag after almost 11 years as lead vocalist. In April 2025, Ginn announced a new line-up of Black Flag featuring relatively-unknown musicians Max Zanelly on vocals, David Rodriguez on bass and Bryce Weston on drums. No further information on the new line-up of the band was released until a month later, where a press photo revealed that not only were the new members over 40 years Ginn's junior, but that Zanelly was a woman – making her the first female vocalist of Black Flag in the band's 49-year history, as well as the second ever woman to join the band behind bassist Kira Roessler in 1983.

On May 26, 2025, FLAG reunited for a performance at the Punk Rock Bowling Music Festival.

London Downey is replacing Black Flag's current lead singer Max Zanelly during the band's 2026 fall tour. Zanelly had issues obtaining a work visa so she was unable to tour but is set to re-join the band in 2027.

== Style and legacy ==
The band's selfless work ethic was a model for the decade ahead, overcoming indifference, lack of venues, poverty, [and] even police harassment. Black Flag was among the first bands to suggest that if you didn't like "the system," you should simply create your own.

— Music journalist Michael Azerrad in the book Our Band Could Be Your Life (2001)

Black Flag are primarily a hardcore punk band and are considered to be one of the first hardcore punk bands. According to Ryan Cooper of About.com and author Doyle Greene, Black Flag is one of the pioneers of the post-hardcore genre for the experimental style they later started playing. Black Flag experimented with a sludge metal sound on their album My War. Black Flag also have used elements of styles such as jazz, blues, spoken word, heavy metal, blues rock, free jazz, math rock, and instrumental music.

Throughout their ten-year career as a band, Black Flag's experiences became legendary, especially in the Southern California area. Much of the band's history is chronicled in Henry Rollins' own published tour diary Get in the Van. Black Flag were reportedly blacklisted by the LAPD and Hollywood rock clubs because of the destructiveness of their fans, though Rollins has claimed that police caused far more problems than they solved.

SST Records, an independent American record label that was initially founded to release Black Flag's debut single, released recordings by influential bands such as Bad Brains, Minutemen, Descendents, Meat Puppets, and Hüsker Dü. As well, SST released some albums by Negativland, Soundgarden, Sonic Youth, and Saint Vitus. SST was founded in 1966 by Greg as Solid State Transmitters – later rebranded to release Black Flag albums.

Black Flag's career is chronicled in the book Our Band Could Be Your Life by music journalist Michael Azerrad, who emphasized that the band was "required listening for anyone who was interested in underground music."

Many members of the grunge scene cited Black Flag's My War album as being influential in their departure from the standard punk model. Steve Turner of Mudhoney stated in an interview, "A lot of other people around the country hated the fact that Black Flag slowed down ... but up here it was really great – we were like 'Yay!' They were weird and fucked-up sounding." Kurt Cobain listed both My War and Damaged in his top 50 albums in his journal in 1993. Jeff Hanneman and Dave Lombardo, both known for their work with Slayer, mentioned Black Flag among their influences. Red Hot Chili Peppers bassist Flea has a Black Flag decal on one of his signature Modulus bass guitars, and guitarist John Frusciante has cited Greg Ginn as one of his early influences as a guitar player. British acoustic artist and punk rocker Frank Turner has a Black Flag icon tattoo on his wrist and cites the band as one of his primary inspirations, particularly in regards to their work ethic. With Million Dead, if anything went wrong with their tour, Turner said they would "Think Black Flag". Vocalist Maynard James Keenan of the bands Tool and A Perfect Circle, has described seeing Black Flag perform in 1986 as a young punk rocker in Grand Rapids, Michigan, as a "revelatory and life-changing" experience. A Perfect Circle also covered the Black Flag song "Gimmie Gimmie Gimmie" on their Emotive album. Punk band Rise Against portrayed Black Flag in the 2005 Lords of Dogtown film, and their cover of "Nervous Breakdown" is on the Lords of Dogtown soundtrack. Rise Against also does a cover of the Black Flag song "Fix Me" in the video game Tony Hawk's American Wasteland. Initial Records released a Black Flag cover album in 2002 (re-released with additional tracks in 2006 by ReIgnition Recordings), Black on Black: A Tribute to Black Flag. The compilation features 15 hardcore and metalcore bands – including Most Precious Blood, Converge, the Dillinger Escape Plan, American Nightmare, Drowningman, and Coalesce. Bring Me the Horizon frontman Oliver Sykes also mentioned Black Flag as one of his biggest influences. Sykes has also had the tattoo of Black Flag logo showing the love for the band. Other notable bands who have cited Black Flag as an influence include My Chemical Romance, AFI, Corrosion of Conformity, and Deadguy.

== Iconography ==
The band's name and logo were given by artist Raymond Pettibon to symbolize their themes of rebellion and anarchy. As the band gained popularity the logo was graffitied in and around Los Angeles, drawing the attention of the police to the band's activities.

Black Flag's visual imagery and artwork complemented the themes found in the band's music. Greg Ginn's brother Raymond Ginn, under the pseudonym Raymond Pettibon, created the artwork for all of the band's studio releases with the exceptions of Damaged and the "TV Party" single, as well as providing artwork for the band members to transform into merchandise and gig flyers. When the band found it necessary to change their name from Panic in 1978, it was Pettibon who suggested the new name Black Flag and designed their iconic logo: four vertical black rectangles comprising a stylized rippling black flag. The logo evoked a number of meanings: it was the polar opposite of a white flag of surrender, as well as a symbol for anarchism and a traditional emblem of pirates. At the same time, Rollins disavowed the claim that the logo represented anarchy, stating in a 1985 interview that it means "Anything that you want it to. I guess it's the opposite of the white flag too, which is the flag of surrender. A lot of people think that it means 'Anarchy' but it doesn't."

As the band gained popularity the logo was graffitied on numerous highway overpasses and other public and private surfaces in and around Los Angeles, drawing the attention of the authorities and contributing to an increase in police presence at Black Flag shows.

Pettibon's artwork for the band's albums and flyers was equally stark and confrontational. He typically worked in one panel using only pen and ink, so the message conveyed had to be direct and powerful due to lack of space and color. According to Michael Azerrad in Our Band Could Be Your Life, the artwork "was a perfect visual analogue to the music it promoted – gritty, stark, violent, smart, provocative, and utterly American." It also provided a cerebral aspect to the band's image: as the mainstream media caricatured Black Flag as a mindlessly aggressive act, the pairing of their music with high-concept artwork hinted at a greater intelligence at work that was unknown to outsiders.

Henry Rollins, in his journal collection Get in the Van, notes that Pettibon's artwork became synonymous with Black Flag and that before Rollins joined the band he would collect photocopies of their flyers that had circulated from California to Washington, D.C. The album cover for Nervous Breakdown had a particularly strong impact on Rollins: "The record's cover art said it all. A man with his back to the wall baring his fists. In front of him another man fending him off with a chair. I felt like the guy with his fists up every day of my life."

Pettibon's drawing of a police officer being held at gunpoint was used on flyers and merchandise promoting the "Police Story" single. The speech blurb reads "Make me come, faggot!" The text to the left reads "Art: Chuck Higby", a pseudonym.

Another image which drew considerable attention was the artwork created for the "Police Story" single, showing a police officer being held with a gun in his mouth with the speech blurb "Make me come, faggot!" The image was plastered on flyers all around Los Angeles and added to the police pressure on the band. Pettibon later remarked that "my values are relativistic, and I'll give a cop the benefit of the doubt. If that's me with my gat – my gat's larger than the one depicted – we can have a discussion, and he can answer me just as well with my .357 barrel in his mouth, or on his cheek, or on his adenoids, or down his throat. I'll listen to his whimpering cries."

After joining the band Rollins would sometimes watch Pettibon draw, admiring his work ethic and the fact that he did not make telephone calls or sit for interviews. The drawings themselves rarely bore a direct connection to the music or its lyrical themes. Pettibon himself recalls that:

These drawings just represented what I was thinking. Except for a few instances, the flyers weren't done as commercial art or advertising. You could have stuck anything on a photocopy machine and put the band name and made an advertising flyer, but these weren't done like that. I was vehement about that as much as my personality allowed.

Pettibon also sold pamphlet books of his work through SST, with titles such as Tripping Corpse, New Wave of Violence, and The Bible, the Bottle, and the Bomb, and did artwork for other SST acts such as Minutemen.

In order to adapt Pettibon's artwork to meet the layout requirements of their albums and flyers, the members of Black Flag would alter it by cutting and pasting and adding their name, logo, and gig details to it. They would then make photocopies and put up dozens of flyers to promote their shows. Rollins recalls going out on a flyering mission with roadie Mugger in 1981 in which the pair would put a layer of paste onto a telephone pole, stick up the flyer, and then cover it with an additional coat of paste so that it would last for up to a year. The band members and their crew would do this for miles around, using dozens of flyers to promote a single performance. Pettibon, however, did not always appreciate the band's treatment of his art, which he provided to them largely for free.

"To me my work was the equivalent of a band like Black Flag or any other band who was righteously self-protective of recordings. I would give them original art and it would come back to me scrawled upon and taped over or whited out, and I'd always ask nicely, 'Could you please make a copy of this first and then do that?' Their master tapes were deemed sacrosanct, while my work was seen as completely disposable, but I'm not venting or complaining, just stating fact."

Pettibon also felt pigeonholed by his association with the band, and had a falling out with them in 1985 over artwork used on the cover of the Loose Nut album, which had been used for a flyer several years earlier. Ginn resurrected it without telling his brother and turned it over to drummer Bill Stevenson to do the layout, who cut it into pieces and used them as elements for the cover and lyric sheet. Pettibon became irate and he and Ginn stopped speaking for some time, although his artwork continued to be used for the remainder of the band's career.

== Band members ==
=== Current ===
Black Flag

- Greg Ginn – guitars, backing vocals (1976–1986, 2003, 2013–2014, 2019–present)
- Max Zanelly – lead vocals (2025–present)
- David Rodriguez – bass (2025–present)
- Bryce Weston – drums (2025–present)
- London Downey – lead vocals (2026) (filling in for Zanelly on the band's 2026 fall tour)

FLAG

- Keith Morris – lead vocals (2011, 2013–present)
- Chuck Dukowski – bass, backing vocals (2011, 2013–present)
- Bill Stevenson – drums (2011, 2013–present)
- Stephen Egerton – lead guitar, backing vocals (2011, 2013–present)
- Dez Cadena – rhythm guitar, lead vocals (2013–present)

== Discography ==
Studio albums

- Damaged (1981)
- My War (1984)
- Family Man (1984)
- Slip It In (1984)
- Loose Nut (1985)
- In My Head (1985)
- What The... (2013)

== Videography ==
- The Art of Punk – Black Flag (The Museum of Contemporary Art) (2013) – Documentary featuring the art of Raymond Pettibon.

== Tribute compilations ==
- Black on Black: A Tribute to Black Flag (Initial) (2002)
- Rise Above: 24 Black Flag Songs to Benefit the West Memphis Three (2002)

== See also ==
- List of songs recorded by Black Flag
