= SST Records =

Record label

- Founded: 1966 (as Solid State Tuners); 1978 (as SST Records)
- Founder: Greg Ginn
- Distributor: Various
- Genre: Rock; punk rock; alternative rock; heavy metal
- Country of origin: United States
- Location: Taylor, Texas
- Official website: sstsuperstore.com

SST Records is an American independent record label formed in 1978 in Long Beach, California by musician Greg Ginn. The company was first founded in 1966 by Ginn at age 12 as Solid State Transmitters, a small business through which he sold electronics equipment. Ginn repurposed the company as a record label to release material by his band Black Flag.

Music writer Michael Azerrad wrote, "Ginn took his label from a cash-strapped, cop-hassled store-front operation to easily the most influential and popular underground indie [label] of the Eighties". Along with other independent American labels such as Twin/Tone, Touch and Go Records, Epitaph, Alternative Tentacles, and Dischord, SST helped to spearhead the nationwide network of underground bands that formed the pre-Nirvana indie-rock scene. These labels presided over the shift from the hardcore punk that then dominated the American underground scene to the more diverse styles of alternative rock that were emerging. SST initially focused on releasing material by hardcore punk groups from Southern California. As many of the bands on the label sought to expand beyond the limitations of the hardcore genre, SST released many key albums that were instrumental in the development of American alternative rock, including releases by the Minutemen, Hüsker Dü, the Meat Puppets, Bad Brains, Soundgarden, Sonic Youth, and Dinosaur Jr. After a peak release schedule in the late 1980s, SST began venturing into jazz releases. SST is now based in Taylor, Texas. Sonic Youth, Soundgarden, Dinosaur Jr., and the Meat Puppets have reclaimed the rights to their respective SST material after leaving the label.

== History ==
=== Early years ===
Greg Ginn created Solid State Tuners (SST) at the age of 12. SST was a mail-order business that sold modified World War II surplus radio equipment. The business was small but thrived well into Ginn's early adulthood.

In 1976 Ginn formed the punk rock band Panic. Panic recorded eight songs in January 1978, but no labels were interested in releasing the music aside from Los Angeles, California record label Bomp! Records. By late 1978 Bomp! had still not formally agreed to release the music on record, so Ginn decided he had enough business experience with SST to release it himself. Pressing records turned out to be a simple matter; "I just looked in the phone book under record pressing plants and there was one there", Ginn recalled, "and so I just took it to them and I knew about printing because I had always done catalogs." SST Records released the music recorded by Ginn's band (now named Black Flag) as the Nervous Breakdown EP in January 1979.

Many early Black Flag shows ended in violence, often involving the Los Angeles Police Department. As a result, the police tapped the label's phones and kept the SST office under surveillance. Ginn claims undercover police posing as homeless people sat close to SST's front door. The band were unable to hire a lawyer because of a lack of money; Ginn later explained: "I mean, we were thinking about skimping on our meals. … There was no place to go". By 1980, L.A. clubs had begun to ban hardcore punk shows, adding to SST's troubles.

SST issued the Minutemen's debut EP Paranoid Time as its second release in 1980. The songs were recorded and mixed in a single night for $300. Minutemen bassist Mike Watt recalled, "It was at that point we realized all you had to do was pay for the pressings, that records weren't a gift from Mount Olympus . . . Maybe it was from Greg's experience with ham radios, but he believed if you try, you can get things beyond your little group." Facing hostility towards hardcore punk, SST groups like Black Flag and the Minutemen played wherever they could, mainly at house parties and in basements early on. Black Flag began traveling up the California coast to play Mabuhay Gardens in San Francisco, making seven trips in total. SST house record producer Spot went along as sound-man and tour manager, a job he would perform for several years, along with helping to record much of the label's music.

SST sold its releases to small distributors at a deliberately low price; however, since the distributors typically sold import records, the records usually ended up in specialty shops where they would sell for high prices. Ginn decided to release the first Black Flag album Damaged (1981) via a mainstream distributor. SST struck a deal with MCA Records to co-release Damaged on Unicorn Records, a smaller label distributed by MCA. Just prior to the album's release, MCA decided not to release Damaged, citing its "anti-parent" subject matter. SST sued Unicorn claiming the label did not pay rightful royalties and expenses for the album. Unicorn countersued and obtained an injunction preventing Black Flag from releasing further material until the case was settled. When SST released the Black Flag compilation Everything Went Black, Unicorn took SST to court in July 1983. Ginn and Black Flag bassist Chuck Dukowski (who had become a co-owner of SST) were found in violation of the injunction and were sent to the Los Angeles County Jail for five days. Late in 1983 Unicorn went bankrupt and Black Flag was able to release records again.

=== Expansion and diversification ===
Despite its legal troubles, SST continued to release records by artists including Minutemen, Saccharine Trust, and Meat Puppets. In 1982 Saint Paul hardcore group Hüsker Dü became the label's first non-West Coast signing. Following the resolution of the debacle with Unicorn Records, SST released four Black Flag albums in 1984. The multiple Black Flag albums, along with the double album releases Zen Arcade and Double Nickels on the Dime by Hüsker Dü and the Minutemen, respectively, stretched the label's resources. While SST believed Zen Arcade would be a sizable underground hit, pressings of over 5,000 copies were unknown territory for the label, so it erred on the side of caution and did not print over that number in its initial pressing. Awarded critical acclaim by several mainstream media outlets, Zen Arcade sold out quickly and remained out of print for months. Ginn decided to cut the promotional costs of the Black Flag albums by issuing them in quick succession and having the band tour solidly behind the releases.

During the mid-1980s Hüsker Dü became SST's star attraction, their strong songwriting and increasingly melodic music becoming the key link between hardcore and the developing sound of college rock. The steady recording and release of records by the band (which released three albums over the course of 1984 and 1985) created an influx of income for the label and afforded it leverage to gather payment from distributors for other releases. However, the band felt that SST did not devote enough attention to its releases; Hüsker Dü drummer Grant Hart said after the band left the label, "I think there's a little reluctance on their part to let anything get a little more attention than Black Flag." In 1985, Hüsker Dü wanted to self-produce its third studio album, New Day Rising. Ignoring the band's wishes, SST assigned Spot to supervise the sessions. Grant Hart later explained: "We had no other choice but to work with him. SST made us work with him". Aware of the tension, Spot "had to do what the record company wanted". New Day Rising, as a result, became one of the last recordings Spot did for the label, and the band soon signed to major label Warner Bros. Records.

SST's roster was further diminished by the 1985 demise of the Minutemen (the result of the death of guitarist D. Boon) and the 1986 breakup of Black Flag. The label replaced these bands with new signings Sonic Youth, Dinosaur Jr, and Bad Brains. Sonic Youth mentioned SST often in interviews and in music writer Michael Azerrad's estimation, "seemed to be actively campaigning to get signed to the indie powerhouse"; in turn, Sonic Youth was instrumental in getting SST to sign Dinosaur Jr. Gerard Cosloy, manager of Dinosaur Jr's previous label Homestead Records, said, "SST was the label everyone wanted to be on [. . .] Everyone's favorite bands were on the label; SST was funnier and cooler and it also had the machinery."

In 1986, Ginn bought New Alliance Records from Mike Watt, who had founded the label with D. Boon. Ginn and SST proceeded to reissue some of New Alliance's key releases—albums by Descendents, Hüsker Dü's Land Speed Record, and all of the Minutemen's non-SST releases—on SST. He then converted New Alliance to a label based around unusual jazz, rock, and spoken word releases.

In the late '80s and early '90s, Ginn started two SST-distributed sub-labels. The first, Cruz Records, which started in 1987, released three solo records by Ginn in the space of a year, and also released records by ALL, Big Drill Car, and Chemical People. The second, the short-lived Issues Records, concentrated on spoken-word releases, including a double album by former NBA player Bill Walton with music by Ray Manzarek.

=== Decline in prominence ===
Several artists left SST in the late 1980s. By 1987, just a year after signing with the label, Sonic Youth had grown disenchanted with it. Guitarist Thurston Moore said, "SST's accounting was a bit suspect to us", and the group's other guitarist Lee Ranaldo criticized the label's "stoner administrative quality". The band was also dissatisfied with Ginn's newer signings. Unhappy that income from their records was ultimately helping to fund "lame-ass records", Sonic Youth acrimoniously left the label and signed with Enigma Records in 1988. Dinosaur Jr left SST for Blanco y Negro Records in 1990. Frontman J Mascis said, "I like Greg Ginn and stuff, but they wouldn't pay you."

In 1987 SST released over 80 titles, a "ridiculous amount even by major label standards", according to Azerrad. SST's prestige declined and by 1990 Seattle-based indie label Sub Pop had upstaged SST. SST's reputation was damaged severely when sound collage group Negativland fought a long legal battle with SST in the wake of its sampling lawsuit over their notorious "cover" of U2's hit "I Still Haven't Found What I'm Looking For", on the 1991 U2 single. The case was settled when Ginn and SST agreed to fully release most of Negativland's masters (mainly their Over The Edge series of cassettes) in exchange for completing work on a live album that had been planned long before their legal battles began, as well as keeping Negativland's three SST releases on the label for a short period (the copyright in those has since reverted to Negativland). This entire battle was later the basis for Negativland's 1995 book/CD, Fair Use: The Story of the Letter U and the Numeral 2. (One bit of detournement took the bumper sticker "SST: Corporate Rock Still Sucks" and made it into "Corporate SST Still Sucks Rock".)

SST went into near-hibernation in the mid-90s, deleting much of its jazz output, and releasing little new material apart from Ginn's projects (including Confront James, Mojack), but still keeping the catalogs of Black Flag, the Minutemen, Firehose, Hüsker Dü, the Descendents, and Bad Brains in print. Several artists formerly on the label, including Sonic Youth and the Meat Puppets, sued SST to reclaim their master recordings, claiming unpaid royalties. The label had ceased releasing any material by new artists by the end of the 1990s. Ginn blamed this on the bankruptcy of the label's distributor, DNA.

== Present ==
The label eventually resumed releasing new material in the mid-2000s. However, these new releases have been restricted to Ginn-related projects like Gone, Hor, Jambang, and Greg Ginn and the Taylor Texas Corrugators.

In 2002, Ginn signed a new distribution deal with Koch Records and announced a series of new releases from his various projects. In 2006, independent digital music distributor The Orchard announced that 94 titles from SST's back catalog would become available on digital services like eMusic and the iTunes Music Store.

In 2007, Ginn, his music studios, and the label moved to Taylor, Texas, with Ginn citing the city as a "great place to work" and noting its close proximity to Austin.

== Discography and roster ==
- SST Records discography
- List of SST Records bands
