= Somery =

Compilation album by the Descendents
- Released: July 16, 1991
- Recorded: March 1981; June 1982; April 1985; March-April 1986; January 1987
- Studios: Music Lab, Los Angeles; Total Access, Redondo Beach, California; Radio Tokyo, Los Angeles
- Genres: Hardcore punk; skate punk
- Length: 53:12
- Label: SST
- Producers: Spot, David Tarling, Bill Stevenson

Descendents chronology
Hallraker: Live! (1989)	Somery (1991)	Everything Sucks (1996)

Somery is a compilation album by the American punk rock band the Descendents, released in 1991 through SST Records. It compiles songs from their Fat EP (1981) and the albums Milo Goes to College (1982), I Don't Want to Grow Up (1985), Enjoy! (1986), and All (1987).

== Background ==
In 1987 SST Records had purchased the Descendents' previous label New Alliance Records, releasing their 1987 album All and re-releasing all of their previous material. Following the Descendents' final tours in spring and summer 1987, singer Milo Aukerman had left the band to pursue a career in biochemistry. The remaining members—bassist Karl Alvarez, guitarist Stephen Egerton, and drummer Bill Stevenson—relaunched the band under the name All, releasing three albums on the SST subsidiary Cruz Records between 1988 and 1991 with singers Dave Smalley and Scott Reynolds. SST also released the Descendents live albums Liveage! (1987) and Hallraker: Live! (1989), both recorded during the final two Descendents tours. Somery was released in 1991, compiling tracks from the Descendents' past studio releases. Stevenson created the cover art for the compilation while Egerton did the graphics. The Descendents would later reunite with Aukerman in 1995 to record Everything Sucks.

Stevenson remarked in 1993 that "Somery sold more than any of the Descendents albums put together. All the kids are just now getting into it, so that way they can buy one record and kind of get into it and see what it's all about, and then if they really like it they can buy all the other records. See, back when we were touring, nobody came to see us. It's only now [that] the Descendents have become popular."

== Reception ==
Professional ratings
Review scores
Source	Rating
Tom Hull – on the Web	B+

Stephen Thomas Erlewine of Allmusic gave Somery four and a half stars out of five, saying that although "a handful of great songs from their best albums are missing, Somery nevertheless selects the highlights from their occasionally uneven records, making it a useful and comprehensive retrospective." Erlewine's colleague Mike DaRonco called it a felony that "Pep Talk" from All was not included on the compilation. Rock critic Robert Christgau gave the album an A− rating, opining that the 1988 compilation Two Things at Once contained the band's best material, "But anyone beguiled, enthralled, or smacked between the eyes by how nakedly these guys don't quite understand their class rage and love-hungry sexual anxiety will hear through their bouts of misogyny and sophomoric humor for the 19 more tuneful if less inspired selections from three later and lesser albums, as in the tortured breakup song/metaphor 'Clean Sheets' and the fuckup/square's confession 'Coolidge'." Jenny Eliscu of Rolling Stone called Somery "the only Descendents record to qualify as must-have. It's got virtually all of the winning songs, from the goofy hardcore tunes [...] to the more commercial-sounding rockers".

== Track listing ==
No.	Title	Writer(s)	Length
1.	"All" (from All, 1987)	Bill Stevenson, Pat McCuistion	0:01
2.	"My Dad Sucks" (from the Fat EP, 1981)	Frank Navetta, Tony Lombardo	0:35
3.	"Suburban Home" (from Milo Goes to College, 1982)	Lombardo	1:40
4.	"Silly Girl" (from I Don't Want to Grow Up, 1985)	Stevenson	2:21
5.	"Kids" (from Enjoy!, 1986)	Stevenson	0:44
6.	"Clean Sheets" (from All, 1987)	Stevenson	3:12
7.	"Sour Grapes" (from Enjoy!, 1986)	Milo Aukerman, Doug Carrion	3:47
8.	"Weinerschnitzel" (from the Fat EP, 1981)	Stevenson, McCuistion	0:11
9.	"Myage" (from Milo Goes to College, 1982)	Stevenson	2:00
10.	"Good Good Things" (from I Don't Want to Grow Up, 1985)	Stevenson	2:19
11.	"Van" (from All, 1987)	Aukerman (lyrics); Karl Alvarez, Stephen Egerton (music)	2:59
12.	"Bikeage" (from Milo Goes to College, 1982)	Stevenson	2:12
13.	"Enjoy" (from Enjoy!, 1986)	Aukerman, Carrion, Ray Cooper, Stevenson	2:10
14.	"Theme" (from I Don't Want to Grow Up, 1985)	Lombardo	2:12
15.	"Coolidge" (from All, 1987)	Alvarez	2:45
16.	"I Like Food" (from the Fat EP, 1981)	Stevenson	0:16
17.	"I Wanna Be a Bear" (from Milo Goes to College, 1982)	Lombardo, Navetta	0:41
18.	"I Don't Want to Grow Up" (from I Don't Want to Grow Up, 1985)	Lombardo	1:19
19.	"Cheer" (from Enjoy!, 1986)	Stevenson	3:01
20.	"Pervert" (from I Don't Want to Grow Up, 1985)	Aukerman (lyrics), Lombardo (music)	1:45
21.	"Hope" (from Milo Goes to College, 1982)	Aukerman	1:59
22.	"All-O-Gistics" (from All, 1987)	Stevenson, McCuistion (lyrics); Egerton (music)	3:00
23.	"I'm Not a Loser" (from Milo Goes to College, 1982)	Navetta	1:28
24.	"Get the Time" (from Enjoy!, 1986)	Aukerman	3:12
25.	"Hürtin' Crüe" (from Enjoy!, 1986)	Aukerman (music and lyrics); Carrion, Cooper, Stevenson (music)	2:34
26.	"Cameage" (from All, 1987)	Stevenson	3:03
27.	"Descendents" (from I Don't Want to Grow Up, 1985)	Aukerman, Cooper, Stevenson (lyrics); Lombardo (music and lyrics)	1:43
28.	"No, All!" (from All, 1987)	Stevenson, McCuistion	0:03
Total length:			53:12

== Personnel ==
Band

- Karl Alvarez – bass guitar on tracks from All
- Milo Aukerman – vocals
- Doug Carrion – bass guitar on tracks from Enjoy!
- Ray Cooper – guitar on tracks from I Don't Want to Grow Up and Enjoy!
- Stephen Egerton – guitar on tracks from All, graphics
- Frank Navetta – guitar on tracks from the Fat EP and Milo Goes to College
- Tony Lombardo – bass guitar on tracks from the Fat EP, Milo Goes to College, and I Don't Want to Grow Up
- Bill Stevenson – drums, cover art, producer of tracks from I Don't Want to Grow Up, Enjoy!, and All

Production

- Richard Andrews – engineer of tracks from Enjoy! and All
- Ethan James – engineer of tracks from Enjoy!
- Spot – producer and engineer of tracks from the Fat EP and Milo Goes to College
- David Tarling – producer and engineer of tracks from I Don't Want to Grow Up
