= Hallraker: Live! =

Live album by the Descendents
- Released: January 10, 1989
- Recorded: April 9 and July 13, 1987
- Venues: Berkeley Square, Berkeley, California; First Avenue, Minneapolis
- Studios: Third Wave Recording, Torrance, California
- Genre: Punk rock
- Length: 32:16
- Label: SST
- Producer: Bill Stevenson

Descendents chronology
Two Things at Once (1988)	Hallraker: Live! (1989)	Somery (1989)

Hallraker: Live! is a live album by the American punk rock band the Descendents, released in 1989 through SST Records. It was their second live album and served as a companion to 1987's Liveage!; both albums were recorded on the band's spring and summer 1987 tours but feature completely different sets of songs. The recordings for Hallraker: Live! came from an April 9 show at Berkeley Square, Berkeley, California and a July 13 show at First Avenue in Minneapolis. Singer Milo Aukerman left the band after these tours to pursue a career in biochemistry, and the band relaunched itself under the name ALL.

== Background ==
The tracks on Hallraker: Live! were taken from two performances: April 9, 1987 at Berkeley Square in Berkeley, California on the band's tour in support of their 1987 album All, and July 13, 1987 at First Avenue in Minneapolis during the last weeks of their "FinALL" tour. The April 9 show was recorded by Pacific Mobile Recorders and engineered by Jim Hibbard, while the July 13 show was recorded by Metro Mobile Location Recording and engineered by Timothy Powell, Mark Harder, and the band's talent manager and booking agent Matt Rector. The "FinALL" tour was so-called because it was to be, at the time, the Descendents' final tour; singer Milo Aukerman was quitting the band to pursue postgraduate education in biochemistry, after which the band was relaunching itself under the new name All with singer Dave Smalley (Aukerman would later reunite with the band in 1995 for further albums and tours under the Descendents name).

Recordings from the July 13 Minneapolis show had previously been released in 1987 as Liveage!, which featured performances of many of the band's most popular songs. A completely different set of songs was selected for Hallraker: Live!, the two serving as companion albums. Drummer Bill Stevenson explained:

Hallraker will be thought of as "the other" live Descendents LP. The Liveage! LP served as a sort of "greatist [sic] hits" album, as well as being an accurate documentary of the band in concert. But at the request of fans telling us about all of the songs we "should have put" on Liveage!, we decided to release another album with a completely different set of songs, giving people the entire view of the band, with nothing held back.

The live recordings were mixed February 5–7, 1988 at Third Wave Recording in Torrance, California and engineered by Richard Andrews, who had worked on Liveage! and the band's last two studio albums, Enjoy! (1986) and All (1987). Stevenson served as record producer. The album was released on January 10, 1989. Bassist Karl Alvarez provided drawings for the album artwork. The album's sleeve defines the term "hallraker" as "an unrelenting musical performance, resulting in exodus maximus by all audience members".

== Reception ==
Professional ratings
Review scores
Source	Rating
New Musical Express	6/10

Jeremy Salmon of Allmusic gave Hallraker: Live! three stars out of five, saying that "The recordings here do well to capture the vitality and frenzy of the band in action, even as they were in the final throes of existence. Among the songs that are included, 'Pep Talk', 'Cheer', and 'My World' are the highlights. Other tracks like 'Iceman' and 'Jealous of the World' demonstrate the metal edge that developed in the band's sound in their last couple of studio albums." Jenny Eliscu of Rolling Stone opined that both live albums were "for completists only" and that the selection of songs on Liveage! was superior those on Hallraker: Live!

== Track listing ==
No.	Title	Writer(s)	Length
1.	"Global Probing"	Frank Navetta	1:20
2.	"My World"	Milo Aukerman	3:36
3.	"Hürtin' Crüe"	Aukerman, Doug Carrion, Ray Cooper, Bill Stevenson	2:31
4.	"Hey Hey"	Tony Lombardo	1:39
5.	"Kabuki Girl / All"	Lombardo / Stevenson, Pat McCuistion	1:07
6.	"Pep Talk"	Stevenson (lyrics), Aukerman (music and lyrics)	3:01
7.	"Jealous of the World"	Aukerman	3:48
8.	"Christmas Vacation"	Aukerman (lyrics), Stevenson (music)	2:41
9.	"I Like Food"	Stevenson	0:15
10.	"Iceman"	Aukerman (lyrics), Stephen Egerton (music)	3:14
11.	"Good Good Things"	Stevenson	2:03
12.	"Cheer"	Stevenson	2:53
13.	"Rockstar"	Navetta (lyrics), Lombardo (music)	0:38
14.	"No FB"	Aukerman	0:34
15.	"Cameage"	Stevenson	2:56
Total length:			32:16

== Personnel ==
Band

- Milo Aukerman – vocals
- Stephen Egerton – guitar
- Karl Alvarez – bass guitar, cover drawings
- Bill Stevenson – drums, producer

Production

- Richard Andrews – studio engineer, mixing
- Mark Harder – live engineer (July 13 show)
- Jim Hibbard – live engineer (April 9 show)
- Timothy Powel – live engineer (July 13 show)
- Matt Rector – live engineer (July 13 show)
