= Two Things at Once =

Compilation album by the Descendents
- Released: 1986
- Recorded: 1979, March 1981, June 1982
- Studios: Media Art, Los Angeles; Music Lab, Los Angeles; Total Access, Redondo Beach, California
- Genre: Hardcore punk
- Length: 32:14
- Label: New Alliance Records
- Producers: Spot, David Nolte

Descendents chronology
Liveage! (1987)	Two Things at Once (1986)	Hallraker: Live! (1989)

Two Things at Once is a compilation album by the American punk rock band the Descendents, released in 1986 through New Alliance Records. It combines the band's 1982 debut album Milo Goes to College with the 1985 release Bonus Fat, itself a compilation of 1981's Fat EP, 1979's "Ride the Wild" / "It's a Hectic World" single, and the track "Global Probing" from a 1981 compilation titled Chunks. Two Things at Once has been described by critics as an essential collection of the band's early years.

== Background ==
From 1981 to 1986 the Descendents' releases had been published by New Alliance Records, an independent record label run by D. Boon and Mike Watt of the San Pedro-based punk band the Minutemen, who were contemporaries of the Descendents. Following Boon's death in 1985, New Alliance was sold to SST Records in 1987. SST released the Descendents' 1987 albums All and Liveage! and also re-released all of their previous albums. Two Things at Once was released in 1987, combining all of the band's recorded output from 1979 to 1982 in a single release: Their debut single "Ride the Wild" / "It's a Hectic World" (1979), the Fat EP (1981), their first full-length album Milo Goes to College (1982), and the song "Global Probing" from the 1981 New Alliance compilation Chunks.

== Reception ==
Mike DaRonco of Allmusic gave Two Things at Once four stars out of five, saying that "All that mischievous teenage skaters could appreciate is here, classics like 'Myage', 'I'm Not a Loser', 'Bikeage', and 'Hope'. But for all those who already own their "best of" (Somery, which features the previously mentioned songs), other less-known hits such as 'Marriage', 'I'm Not a Punk', and 'Catalina' are exclusive to this release." Jenny Eliscu of Rolling Stone called the album "an essential introduction to the group."

== Track listing ==
Milo Goes to College (1982)
No.	Title	Writer(s)	Length
1.	"Myage"	Bill Stevenson	2:00
2.	"I Wanna Be a Bear"	Tony Lombardo, Frank Navetta	0:40
3.	"I'm Not a Loser"	Navetta	1:28
4.	"Parents"	Navetta	1:37
5.	"Tonyage"	Lombardo, Stevenson	0:55
6.	"M-16"	Lombardo, Milo Aukerman	0:40
7.	"I'm Not a Punk"	Lombardo	1:01
8.	"Catalina"	Lombardo, Stevenson	1:44
9.	"Suburban Home"	Lombardo	1:40
10.	"Statue of Liberty"	Navetta	1:58
11.	"Kabuki Girl"	Lombardo	1:09
12.	"Marriage"	Navetta, Stevenson	1:37
13.	"Hope"	Aukerman	1:58
14.	"Bikeage"	Stevenson	2:12
15.	"Jean Is Dead"	Stevenson	1:31

Fat EP (1981)
No.	Title	Writer(s)	Length
16.	"My Dad Sucks"	Navetta, Lombardo	0:35
17.	"Mr. Bass"	Navetta	2:05
18.	"I Like Food"	Stevenson	0:16
19.	"Hey Hey"	Lombardo	1:31
20.	"Weinerschnitzel"	Stevenson, Pat McCuistion	0:10

from Chunks (1981)
No.	Title	Writer(s)	Length
21.	"Global Probing"	Navetta	1:05

"Ride the Wild" / "It's a Hectic World" (1979)
No.	Title	Writer(s)	Length
22.	"Ride the Wild"	Navetta	2:30
23.	"It's a Hectic World"	Lombardo	1:52
Total length:			32:14

== Personnel ==
Band

- Milo Aukerman – vocals
- Frank Navetta – guitar, vocals on "Ride the Wild", Bonus Fat cover art
- Tony Lombardo – bass guitar, vocals on "It's a Hectic World"
- Bill Stevenson – drums

Production

- Spot – producer and engineer of tracks 1–21
- David Nolte – producer and mix engineer of tracks 22 and 23
- Jeff Atkinson – Milo Goes to College cover art; Milo character illustration on Bonus Fat cover art
