= Liveage! =

Live album by the Descendents
- Released: November 4, 1987
- Recorded: July 13, 1987
- Venues: First Avenue, Minneapolis
- Studios: Third Wave Recording, Torrance, California
- Genre: Punk rock
- Length: 37:45
- Label: SST
- Producer: Bill Stevenson

Descendents chronology
All (1987)	Liveage! (1987)	Two Things at Once (1988)

Liveage! is a live album by the American punk rock band the Descendents, released in 1987 through SST Records. It is the band's first live album, it was recorded July 13, 1987 at First Avenue in Minneapolis during their summer 1987 "FinALL" tour, so-called because singer Milo Aukerman was leaving the Descendents to pursue a career in biochemistry, after which the band was relaunching itself under the name All. Liveage! was followed by a second live album, Hallraker: Live! (1989), which was partly recorded at the same show but featured a completely different set of songs.

The album's title derives from the band having titled some of their songs by adding the suffix "-age" to words that would not normally use it (cf. "Myage", "Tonyage", "Bikeage", and "Cameage").

== Background ==
Liveage! was recorded July 13, 1987 at First Avenue in Minneapolis during the Descendents' 50-day Summer "FinALL" tour. The show was recorded by Metro Mobile Location Recording, and the live recording was engineered by Timothy Powell, Mark Harder, and the band's talent manager and booking agent Matt Rector. The "FinALL" tour was so-called both because it was their second tour promoting their most recent studio album, All (1987), and because it was to be, at the time, the Descendents' final tour; singer Milo Aukerman was quitting the band to pursue postgraduate education in biochemistry, after which the band was relaunching itself under the new name All with singer Dave Smalley (Aukerman would later reunite with the band in 1995 for further albums and tours under the Descendents name).

The live recording was mastered at Third Wave Recording studio in Torrance, California by recording engineer Richard Andrews, who had worked on the band's last two albums, Enjoy! (1986) and All (1987). Descendents drummer Bill Stevenson served as record producer. The album liner featured an illustration by bassist Karl Alvarez done for the FinALL tour posters, depicting guitarist Stephen Egerton with wild eyes and a wide, toothy grin, wearing a spiked crown. ""When they go out on tour, Stephen likes to be the one that drives", said artist Chris Shary in a 2013 documentary of the band. "Well, he'd been up for a while, just pounding coffee, and Karl was in the back, and Stephen just turned back to look at him and it was this crazed [look], like almost the eyes spinning, and the big grin, and so Karl drew that out and that was the FinALL tour drawing." The illustration was later modified an adapted into All's mascot Allroy.

Liveage! was released in late 1987 through SST Records as an 18-track LP and a 20-track cassette and compact disc, the latter two formats including the additional songs "Sour Grapes" and "Pervert". The album featured many of the band's most popular songs, and was followed two years later by a second live album, Hallraker: Live!, composed of an entirely different set of songs recorded partly at the same show as Liveage! and partly at a show in Berkeley, California three months earlier. Stevenson explained:

Hallraker will be thought of as "the other" live Descendents LP. The Liveage! LP served as a sort of "greatist [sic] hits" album, as well as being an accurate documentary of the band in concert. But at the request of fans telling us about all of the songs we "should have put" on Liveage!, we decided to release another album with a completely different set of songs, giving people the entire view of the band, with nothing held back.

== Reception ==
Mike DaRonco of Allmusic gave Liveage! three stars out of five, saying that "One could classify this as a best-of live album, considering that it features all the hits [...] Bratty, aggravated punk-pop at its finest, the Descendents were not only way ahead of their time, but they were also one of the most influential punk bands of the '80s." Jenny Eliscu of Rolling Stone commented: "Given its superior selection of songs, Liveage! is the better of the band's two concert recordings; but Descendents weren't the kind of band to switch things up in concert, and these albums are for completists only."

== Track listing ==
LP version

Side A
No.	Title	Writer(s)	Length
1.	"All"	Bill Stevenson, Pat McCuistion	0:01
2.	"I'm Not a Loser"	Frank Navetta	1:22
3.	"Silly Girl"	Stevenson	2:05
4.	"I Wanna Be a Bear"	Tony Lombardo, Navetta	0:40
5.	"Coolidge"	Karl Alvarez	2:32
6.	"Weinerschnitzel"	Stevenson, McCuistion	0:09
7.	"I Don't Want to Grow Up"	Lombardo	1:19
8.	"Kids"	Stevenson, McCuistion	0:39
9.	"Wendy" (originally performed by The Beach Boys)	Brian Wilson, Mike Love	2:07
10.	"Get the Time"	Milo Aukerman	2:59
11.	"Descendents"	Aukerman, Ray Cooper, Stevenson (lyrics); Lombardo (music and lyrics)	1:41

Side B
No.	Title	Writer(s)	Length
1.	"All-O-Gistics"	Stevenson, McCuistion (lyrics); Stephen Egerton (music)	3:38
2.	"Myage"	Stevenson	1:55
3.	"My Dad Sucks"	Navetta, Lombardo	0:36
4.	"Van"	Aukerman (lyrics); Alvarez, Egerton (music)	3:01
5.	"Suburban Home"	Lombardo	1:30
6.	"Hope"	Aukerman	1:59
7.	"Clean Sheets"	Stevenson	3:01
Total length:			31:14

CD and cassette versions

No.	Title	Writer(s)	Length
1.	"All"	Bill Stevenson, Pat McCuistion	0:01
2.	"I'm Not a Loser"	Frank Navetta	1:22
3.	"Silly Girl"	Stevenson	2:05
4.	"I Wanna Be a Bear"	Tony Lombardo, Navetta	0:40
5.	"Coolidge"	Karl Alvarez	2:32
6.	"Weinerschnitzel"	Stevenson, McCuistion	0:09
7.	"I Don't Want to Grow Up"	Lombardo	1:19
8.	"Kids"	Stevenson, McCuistion	0:39
9.	"Wendy" (originally performed by The Beach Boys)	Brian Wilson, Mike Love	2:07
10.	"Get the Time"	Milo Aukerman	2:59
11.	"Descendents"	Aukerman, Ray Cooper, Stevenson (lyrics); Lombardo (music and lyrics)	1:41
12.	"Sour Grapes"	Aukerman, Doug Carrion	4:20
13.	"All-O-Gistics"	Stevenson, McCuistion (lyrics); Stephen Egerton (music)	3:38
14.	"Myage"	Stevenson	1:55
15.	"My Dad Sucks"	Navetta, Lombardo	0:36
16.	"Van"	Aukerman (lyrics); Alvarez, Egerton (music)	3:01
17.	"Suburban Home"	Lombardo	1:30
18.	"Hope"	Aukerman	1:59
19.	"Clean Sheets"	Stevenson	3:01
20.	"Pervert"	Aukerman (lyrics), Lombardo (music)	2:11
Total length:			37:45

== Personnel ==
Band

- Milo Aukerman – vocals
- Stephen Egerton – guitar
- Karl Alvarez – bass guitar, illustrations
- Bill Stevenson – drums, producer

Production

- Richard Andrews – studio engineer, mastering
- Mark Harder – live engineer
- Timothy Powell – live engineer
- Matt Rector – live engineer
