= 88 Elmira St. =

Studio album by Danny Gatton
- Released: March 19, 1991
- Genre: Rock, jazz, country, rockabilly, blues
- Length: 50:44
- Label: Elektra
- Producer: Danny Gatton, Billy Windsor, Ian Kimmet

Danny Gatton chronology
| Unfinished Business (1987) | 88 Elmira St. (1991) | Cruisin' Deuces (1993) |

88 Elmira St. is a 1991 album by guitarist Danny Gatton. The album was Gatton's fifth, but his first on a major record label—Elektra. The instrumental album covers a number of genres, including jazz, country, rockabilly, and blues.

== Background ==
When Gatton signed to Elektra, their only stipulation for his first album on the label was that it should be solely instrumental. On presenting his ideas for the album to the label, they suggested he cut his version of the Simpsons theme tune. The manualist flatulence at the end of the recording may have been Gatton's response to the label's suggestion.

The album's title, 88 Elmira St., is a reference to Gatton's home as a child. Gatton stated that at the time of producing the album, he "was playing Scotty Moore's original guitar [...] It's a Gibson ES-295, and I bought it trashed out twelve years ago. It sounded incredibly good; it had some magic in it, but I didn't know it was Scotty's. Then Billy Hancock kept offering me all kinds of money for it, way more than it should have been worth, so I said, 'What's the deal?' He said, 'I think you've got Scotty Moore's guitar there.'" Similarities to Moore, Al Casey and James Burton can be heard on the album.

== Recording ==
The album was produced by Gatton, Billy Windsor and Ian Kimmet, recorded and mixed by George Cowan at Bearsville Studios in Woodstock, NY and mastered by Bob Ludwig at Masterdisk. The album was recorded at Bearsville Studios, New York and Big Mo Studio, Maryland.

=== Equipment ===
On the album, Gatton used a 1990 Fender Telecaster (his signature version with Joe Barden pickups), a Fender acoustic, a Martin D-28-32, a 1954 Gibson ES 295, a Gibson RB800 5 string banjo, a 1950 Fender 6-string lap steel, and a 1958 5-string Fender Precision Bass. For amplification, he used a 1963 Fender Vibrolux, a 1963 Fender Super Reverb, a 1958 Fender Twin, a 1964 Fender Deluxe, and a 1958 Fender Bassman. Shannon Ford used a Drum Workshop kit with Sabian cymbals. John Previti's basses were the 5-string Fender Precision Bass, a Gibson Ripper and an unspecified upright bass. The keyboards—used by Bill Holloman and Tommy Lepson—were a Hammond B3, a Yamaha DX7, and a Roland D50.

== Reception ==
In a review for AllMusic, Cub Koda wrote that the album was "a whole lot more than just yer average fretboard wanking jam-fest". AllMusic gave the album a 4.5/5 rating. The album peaked at 121 in the Billboard 200 chart.

The entire album was nominated for Best Rock Instrumental Performance at the 1992 Grammy Awards, losing to Eric Johnson's "Cliffs of Dover".

== Track listing ==
| No. | Title | Writer(s) | Length |
|---|---|---|---|
| 1. | "Funky Mama" | Big John Patton | 5:41 |
| 2. | "Elmira St. Boogie" | Danny Gatton | 4:03 |
| 3. | "Blues Newburg" | Danny Gatton | 4:10 |
| 4. | "Quiet Village" | Les Baxter | 4:49 |
| 5. | "Red Label" | Chris Battistone, Danny Gatton | 5:05 |
| 6. | "In My Room" | Gary Usher, Brian Wilson | 4:53 |
| 7. | "The Simpsons" | Danny Elfman | 3:17 |
| 8. | "Muthaship" | Danny Gatton, Billy Windsor, Stephen Windsor | 4:39 |
| 9. | "Pretty Blue" | Danny Gatton | 6:07 |
| 10. | "Fandangus" | Danny Gatton | 3:06 |
| 11. | "Slidin' Home" | Danny Gatton | 4:54 |
| Total length: | | | 50:44 |

== Personnel ==
- Danny Gatton—guitars, producer
- Bill Holloman—saxophone, trumpet, clarinet, trombone, Hammond B3, vibraphone, piano, Yamaha DX7, Roland D50
- Shannon Ford—drums, percussion, Hand-D-Gas
- John Previti—upright and electric basses
- Tommy Lepson—Hammond B3 on "Quiet Village"
- Billy Windsor—Associate Producer
- Ian Kimmet—Executive Producer

=== In other media ===
"Funky Mama" was used in credits of Argentinean television show, Caiga Quien Caiga.
