= Bonus Fat =

Compilation album by the Descendents
- Released: 1985
- Recorded: 1979, March 1981
- Studios: Media Art, Los Angeles; Music Lab, Los Angeles
- Genres: Hardcore punk, power pop
- Length: 10:04
- Label: New Alliance
- Producers: Spot, David Nolte

Descendents chronology
I Don't Want to Grow Up (1985)	Bonus Fat (1985)	Enjoy! (1986)

Bonus Fat is a compilation album by the American punk rock band the Descendents, released in 1985 through New Alliance Records. It combines the band's 1979 debut single "Ride the Wild" / "It's a Hectic World" with their 1981 Fat EP and the track "Global Probing" from the 1981 New Alliance compilation Chunks. The compilation's cover combines guitarist Frank Navetta's illustration for the Fat EP with a caricature of singer Milo Aukerman drawn by Jeff "Rat" Atkins.

New Alliance initially released Bonus Fat as an EP. In 1987 New Alliance was sold to SST, who re-released Bonus Fat on EP, cassette, and compact disc. In 1988 SST paired Bonus Fat with the band's debut album Milo Goes to College as Two Things at Once, a single release compiling all of the band's recorded output from 1979 to 1982.

== Reception ==
Professional ratings
Review scores
Source	Rating
Tom Hull – on the Web	B+

Ned Raggett of Allmusic gave Bonus Fat three stars out of five and focused his comments on "Ride the Wild" and "It's a Hectic World", calling them "gentle, surf-inspired power pop more than anything else." He noted that "It's a Hectic World" is "even more explicitly surfy in ways, but with a nervous, flat new wave edge to it as well — not quite Devo if they grew up on the coast, but there's something to that comparison." Jenny Eliscu of Rolling Stone remarked that the inclusion of these two songs "can't be considered much of a bonus." Rock critic Robert Christgau similarly called these two tracks "forgettable [and] surprisingly poppish" but gave the compilation an A− rating on the strength of the Fat EP material, which he said sounded better on this release than on the original EP.

== Track listing ==
Side A
No.	Title	Writer(s)	Length
1.	"My Dad Sucks" (from the Fat EP, 1981)	Frank Navetta, Tony Lombardo	0:35
2.	"Mr. Bass" (from the Fat EP, 1981)	Navetta	2:05
3.	"I Like Food" (from the Fat EP, 1981)	Bill Stevenson	0:16
4.	"Hey Hey" (from the Fat EP, 1981)	Lombardo	1:31
5.	"Weinerschnitzel" (from the Fat EP, 1981)	Stevenson, Pat McCuistion	0:10
6.	"Global Probing" (from Chunks, 1981)	Navetta	1:05

Side B
No.	Title	Writer(s)	Length
1.	"Ride the Wild" (from "Ride the Wild" / "It's a Hectic World", 1979)	Navetta	2:30
2.	"It's a Hectic World" (from "Ride the Wild" / "It's a Hectic World", 1979)	Lombardo	1:52
Total length:			10:04

== Personnel ==
Band

- Milo Aukerman – vocals
- Frank Navetta – guitar, vocals on "Ride the Wild", cover illustration
- Tony Lombardo – bass guitar, vocals on "It's a Hectic World"
- Bill Stevenson – drums

Production

- Spot – producer and engineer of side A
- David Nolte – producer and mix engineer of side B
- Jeff "Rat" Atkins – Milo character illustration
