= "The Humbler" =

Live album by Robert Gordon and Danny Gatton
- Released: 1996
- Recorded: 1981
- Venue: Berkeley Square
- Genre: Rock and roll, rockabilly
- Label: NRG
- Producer: Glenn Holley

"The Humbler" is a live album by the American guitar player Danny Gatton, with Robert Gordon on vocals. It was released in 1996. Its title was taken from Gatton's nickname, which was bestowed on him by Amos Garrett. Although Gordon is top billed, the album drew widespread praise for the guitar work of Gatton. It was released two years after Gatton's suicide.

Distributed by NRG Records, a label operated by Gatton's mother, the album sold more than 10,000 copies in its first nine months of release.

== Production ==
The album was recorded during a tour to support Gordon's Are You Gonna Be the One, most likely in 1981. The recording was made by the Berkeley Square nightclub sound engineer, Shalom Aberle, and had circulated as a bootleg for years. It was released after Glenn Holley, a fan and car dealer, tracked down the soundman's original tapes.

"The Humbler" contains covers of songs by, among others, Webb Pierce and Bruce Springsteen. It includes a bonus track, recorded at soundcheck, of Gatton improvising with the band's drummer, Shannon Ford.

== Critical reception ==
Professional ratings
Review scores
Source	Rating
AllMusic	3/5 stars
Boston Herald	2.5/4 stars
Edmonton Journal	5/5 stars
The Encyclopedia of Popular Music	3/5 stars
Los Angeles Daily News	4/4 stars
MusicHound Rock: The Essential Album Guide	4/5 stars

The Washington Post wrote that Gatton "occasionally alludes to the styles of Cliff Gallup, Scotty Moore, James Burton and Chuck Berry, and emphasizes the country side of the rockabilly equation with pedal steel guitar licks and lots of Telecaster twang." The Boston Globe thought that "Gordon sings with gruff, garage-rock zeal, but Gatton's wizardry shuts everyone down... He roars through 'Ubangi Stomp' and Roy Brown's 'Good Rockin' Tonight', then plays even faster, yet still intelligently, on Gene Vincent's 'Cruisin''."

The Los Angeles Daily News called the album "the finest straight-ahead guitar album to come down the pike this year," and praised "Gatton's exquisite country-rock picking." The Edmonton Journal determined that "Gatton's slide work on 'The Way I Walk' would leave any blues guitarist wide-eyed... His uncanny ability to maintain total clarity at what seemed like reckless speeds is a constant source of amazement." Rolling Stone opined that the release "is a welcome addition to the official legacy of an American master of the Telecaster." The Boston Herald stated that Gatton "starts slowly but within a few numbers is ripping through his white-hot repertoire of slide tricks, rhythm acrobatics and double- and triple-time solo excursions... It is some show."

AllMusic wrote that, "in keeping with Gordon's '50s and '60s stance, up-tempo early rock & roll is the game here, with Gatton supplying the finger-popping coloration that the music demands... Even as a sideman, he knew the secret of backing a singer: play only what the song requires."

== Track listing ==
No.	Title	Length
1.	"Ubangi Stomp"
2.	"The Way I Walk"
3.	"Good Rockin' Tonight"
4.	"There Stands the Glass"
5.	"Drivin' Wheel"
6.	"Fire"
7.	"Loverboy"
8.	"You Got a Heart Like a Rock"
9.	"Cruisin'"
10.	"Red Cadillac and a Black Moustache"
11.	"Love My Baby"
12.	"Twenty Flight Rock"
13.	"Black Slacks"
14.	"Red Hot"
