= Rock Billy Boogie =

Studio album by Robert Gordon
- Released: 1979
- Recorded: November 1978
- Studio: Plaza Sound, New York City
- Genre: Rockabilly
- Length: 28:48
- Label: RCA
- Producer: Richard Gottehrer

Robert Gordon chronology
Fresh Fish Special (1978)	Rock Billy Boogie (1979)	Bad Boy (1980)

Singles from Rock Billy Boogie
- 1. "It's Only Make Believe" Released: 1979; 2. "Black Slacks" Released: 1979

Rock Billy Boogie is a studio album by Robert Gordon, released on RCA Records in 1979. It peaked at number 106 on the Billboard 200 chart.

== Critical reception ==
Professional ratings
Review scores
Source	Rating
AllMusic	4/5 stars
Robert Christgau	B

Robert Christgau gave the album a "B" grade, saying, "Gordon's nouveau rockabilly has always been a mite slick and a mite fast, and this is his best album because he's no longer hiding it--his blown notes are just blown notes, not stigmata of authenticity." The Globe and Mail noted that "the further he goes with the schtick, the more convincing he gets, and this time around it's hard to criticize his vocal work as stagey or imitative."

Bruce Eder of AllMusic said that "there's not a bad song, or even a less-than-first-rate performance anywhere on it."

== Track listing ==
No.	Title	Writer(s)	Length
1.	"Rock Billy Boogie"	Dorsey Burnette, Johnny Burnette, George Hawkins, Henry Jerome	2:33
2.	"Love My Baby"	Junior Parker	1:42
3.	"I Just Found Out"	Paul Burlison, Dorsey Burnette, Johnny Burnette, Henry Jerome	2:30
4.	"All by Myself"	Dave Bartholomew, Fats Domino	2:17
5.	"Black Slacks"	Joe Bennett, Jimmy Denton	1:41
6.	"The Catman"	Robert Gordon, Diane Lampert, Scott Turner	2:24
7.	"It's Only Make Believe"	Jack Nance, Conway Twitty	2:37
8.	"Wheel of Fortune"	Bennie Benjamin, George David Weiss	2:27
9.	"Am I Blue"	Harry Akst, Grant Clarke	2:08
10.	"Walk On By"	Kendall Hayes	2:18
11.	"I Just Met a Memory"	Robert Gordon, Diane Lampert, Scott Turner	3:15
12.	"Blue Christmas"	Billy Hayes, Jay W. Johnson	2:37

== Personnel ==
Credits adapted from the album's liner notes.

Musicians

- Robert Gordon – vocals
- Chris Spedding – lead guitar
- Scotty Turner – rhythm guitar
- Rob Stoner – bass guitar, piano (on "The Catman", "It's Only Make Believe" and "Wheel of Fortune")
- Howie Wyeth – drums, piano (on "Am I Blue")
- The Three R's – background vocals (on "All by Myself")
- Terry Vernon – background vocals (on "Black Slacks", "It's Only Make Believe" and "Wheel of Fortune")
- Snooky Bellomo – background vocals (on "The Catman")
- Tish Bellomo – background vocals (on "The Catman")
- Paul Evans – background vocals (on "It's Only Make Believe")
- Marty Nelson – background vocals (on "It's Only Make Believe")
- Robin Grean – background vocals (on "It's Only Make Believe")

Technical

- Jimmy Wisner – string arrangement
- Richard Gottehrer – production
- Rob Freeman – engineering
- Eric Block – engineering assistance
- Greg Calbi – mastering
- Acy Lehman – art direction
- Dick Smith – art direction
- Nick Sangiamo – cover photography
- Gary Green – inner sleeve photography

== Charts ==
Chart	Peak position
US Billboard 200	106
