= Enjoy! (Descendents album) =

Studio album by the Descendents
- Released: 1986
- Recorded: March–April 1986
- Studios: Radio Tokyo, Los Angeles
- Genres: Punk rock; punk metal
- Length: 31:30
- Labels: New Alliance, Restless
- Producer: Bill Stevenson

Descendents chronology
Bonus Fat (1985)	Enjoy! (1986)	All (1987)

Enjoy! is the third studio album by American punk rock band Descendents, released in 1986 through New Alliance Records and Restless Records. It was the band's final album with guitarist Ray Cooper and only album with bassist Doug Carrion, both of whom left the group after the album's first supporting tour. Enjoy! was marked by the use of toilet humor, with references to defecation and flatulence in its artwork, the title track, and "Orgofart". It also displayed a darker, more heavy metal-influenced sound in the songs "Hürtin' Crüe", "Days Are Blood", and "Orgo 51". Reviewers were critical of both the scatological humor and the heavier songs on the album. Enjoy! features a cover version of The Beach Boys' "Wendy".

== Writing ==
"Days Are Blood"
At almost 8 minutes, "Days Are Blood" is the longest song in the Descendents' catalog and shows a darker, more heavy metal-influenced style than the band's previous material.

Following three tours of the United States in support of 1985's I Don't Want to Grow Up, the Descendents prepared to record their third album, their first with bassist Doug Carrion. As with their prior records, all four band members contributed songwriting ideas to the album. Some of their new songs displayed a heavy metal influence, including "Hürtin' Crüe", the instrumental "Orgo 51", and the nearly 8-minute "Days Are Blood". "We'd been on tour for so long that we wrote some messed-up freakazoid songs like 'Days Are Blood' and all these weird things", recalled singer Milo Aukerman in 2013. The lyrics of "Hürtin' Crüe" derived from a high school classmate of Aukerman's who had earned a score of 1420 on the SAT, gaining him admittance to the United States Military Academy. Gloating about his accomplishment, he sang a taunt that went "I am better than you / You are a piece of poo / 1420". Aukerman incorporated these lyrics into "Hürtin' Crüe".

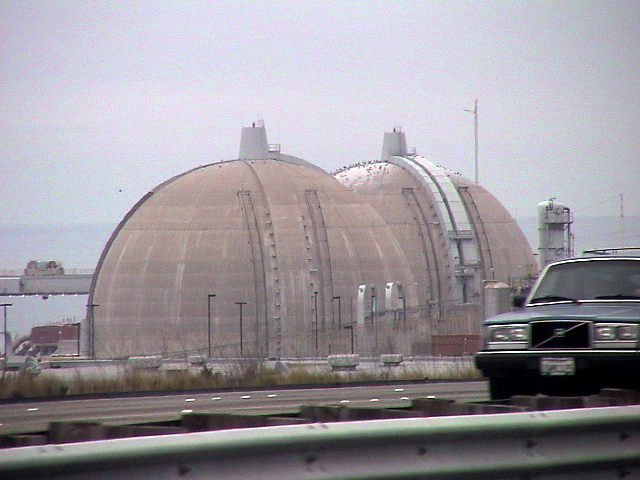
The lyrics of "Kids" mention "driving down to San Diego / Passing up the nuclear tits", referring to the San Onofre Nuclear Generating Station along Interstate 5.

The song "Enjoy", which became the album's title track, openly celebrates flatulence and foot odor. Drummer Bill Stevenson's "Kids" celebrates the band's love of coffee-fueled hyperactivity, referencing their go-to drink, the "Bonus Cup", a mud-like slurry of coffee grounds, hot water, and sugar. "Thanks to modern chemistry, sleep is now optional" he declares at the song's end. Aukerman and Carrion's "Sour Grapes" is sung from the perspective of a frustrated geek whose advances are rebuffed by a new wave girl.

== Recording and cover art ==
Enjoy! was recorded in March and April 1986 at Radio Tokyo studios in Venice, Los Angeles. The Descendents recorded their own farts live in the studio for inclusion on the title track and "Orgofart" (the latter has no instrumentation, consisting entirely of the band members cheering each other on as they fart into recording equipment). Stevenson produced the album, while studio owner Ethan James and his assistant Richard Andrews served as recording engineers. It was Andrews' first experience recording a band on his own, and he found the Descendents' crude humor startling:

"Enjoy"
The band members recorded their own farts for "Enjoy", which celebrates flatulence and foot odor.

I was a jazz musician, and I was at Radio Tokyo cutting my own demos. Ethan James, the owner of the studio, said "If you want to learn how to engineer, I need help." Finally I'm good enough and he's ready to give me some clients, and he says to me "There's this record that I want you to do", and I'm like "Alright! A record! I got a fucking record!" and I go in to do it and it's the Descendents and they're farting. I'm a classically trained musician; I learned to play piano at four, I went to a conservatory for two years, I studied at Berklee College of Music. I know all this stuff, and Bill's like "Stick the microphone closer to my ass so you can hear this fart!" It was terrible. But as time went on, I discovered that it's not about what you know about the music, it's about "are you expressing yourself authentically through the music?", and these guys totally brought the idea of authenticity to my fore, and that totally changed my perception of all music. And to have that "bing" moment from punk rockers was a real mind trip.

Andrews would continue to work with the Descendents and their successor band, All, recording five more of their releases between 1987 and 1989.^{[I]} Stevenson later said that the recording and production qualities on the finished album were "wearing the '80s new wave influence really boldly on the sleeve."

The cover artwork for Enjoy!, which depicts a roll of toilet paper, was drawn by guitarist Ray Cooper under the pseudonym "Scoob Droolins". Rather than listing the song titles on the reverse of the album's sleeve, the band instead replaced them with various euphemisms for feces, such as "floater", "sausage", and "loaf". Stevenson later explained this as an attempt to "come up with as many toilet humor-related jokes as possible."

== Release and supporting tours ==
We left at the same time, but we probably left for different reasons. I just wanted to keep kind of experimenting, and that's really it. It was like "Okay, cool, you're taking the ship north, I'm going south. Roger!" And for Ray, I don't know. He's not really the kind of guy who would have that heart-to-heart with you. Sometimes a man of few words. I don't think he really wanted to be in the center of the tornado of the Descendents.

— Doug Carrion, on he and Ray Cooper leaving the band

Enjoy! was released jointly through New Alliance Records and Restless Records as a ten-track LP. In 1987 New Alliance was sold to SST Records, who re-released Enjoy! on LP, cassette, and compact disc. The cassette and CD versions added two additional tracks, "Orgofart" and "Orgo 51". A music video, the band's first, was created for the song "Kids".

The Descendents supported the album with a tour of the United States through the summer of 1986, beginning June 26 in Chicago and proceeding through the Southern and Mid-Atlantic states, into Canada to Montreal and Toronto, then visiting most of the Midwestern states before making their way northwest to Vancouver, and finally down the West Coast of the United States back to Los Angeles by August 30; covering 34 states and 3 Canadian provinces with a total of 58 shows in 56 cities. For most of their July dates they were supported by Dag Nasty. Cooper and Carrion both left the band that fall, in what Carrion later described as an amicable split. They were replaced by bassist Karl Alvarez and guitarist Stephen Egerton who, after practicing with the band for a few months, played on the second Enjoy! tour from late November 1986 to mid-January 1987. This second tour followed a different route, beginning November 20 in Eugene, Oregon and heading north to Vancouver; east into Alberta; southeast through the Western United States into Kansas, Oklahoma, and Texas; then westward for stops in Albuquerque, Phoenix, and San Diego before doubling back through Arizona, New Mexico, Texas, and Oklahoma; on through the Southern United States; then finally up the East Coast, ending January 16 in Richmond, Virginia having covered 21 states and 2 provinces with a total of 45 shows in 40 cities.

== Reception ==
Professional ratings
Review scores
Source	Rating
AllMusic	2/5 stars

Jeremy Salmon of AllMusic remarked, "Highbrow humor was never a signature of the Descendents, but the toilet-themed album Enjoy! is a bit much." He criticized the scatological humor of "Enjoy", "Orgofart", and the album's artwork, and called the heavy metal-styled "Days Are Blood" and "Orgo 51" "disposable", but noted the similarly heavy "Hürtin' Crüe" as an exception worthy of its inclusion on the band's best-of album Somery. Despite the weaker tracks, he noted that Enjoy! includes several songs central to the Descendents' repertoire, including "Kids", "Wendy", and "Sour Grapes", calling the album "a fine metaphor for the history of the Descendents; no matter what turbulence befell the band, some excellent songs were still able to seep through anything that clogged." Jenny Eliscu of Rolling Stone called Enjoy! "weak overall, due in part to [original bassist Tony Lombardo's] departure, though mostly because of the scatological humor on the title track ('Sniff my ass while I pass gas', goes but one pearl.) The album is rescued by a cover of The Beach Boys' 'Wendy' and the band's own 'Sour Grapes', on which Auckerman gets rejected by a snooty new-wave girl."

Some friends of the band were more complimentary of the album. Dave Naz of Chemical People later remarked that "Milo Goes to College is probably the record you identify most with the band, maybe, but Enjoy! is like, 'Wow!' I don't want to say they polished their sound, but they kind of took it to another level. I think that album best represents them. There's a lot of farting, and that goes on when you're hanging out with those guys." Robert Hecker of Redd Kross cites "Get the Time" as one of his favorite songs: "I regularly lump it in my top three greatest songs in pop music of all time, with 'Hey Jude' and 'Under Pressure'. It's perfect. It is a perfect song. And maybe if [the album] didn't have a toilet paper roll on the cover, it could have sold 20 million copies."

== Cover versions ==
In the decades since its release, several artists have recorded cover versions of songs from Enjoy! for other releases. For the Descendents tribute album Homage: Lots of Bands Doing Descendents' Songs (1995), Inch covered "Kids", Dooms UK covered "Sour Grapes", Snowplow covered "Cheer", Wally covered "Get the Time", and Scarab covered "Green". Saves the Day covered "Cheer" on Ups & Downs: Early Recordings and B-Sides (2004). Good Riddance covered "Sour Grapes" for Milo Turns 50: Songs of the Descendents (2013).

== Track listing ==
=== LP version ===
Side A
No.	Title	Writer(s)	Length
1.	"Enjoy"	Milo Aukerman, Doug Carrion, Ray Cooper, Bill Stevenson	2:10
2.	"Wendy" (originally performed by The Beach Boys)	Brian Wilson, Mike Love	2:22
3.	"Kids"	Stevenson	0:44
4.	"Hürtin' Crüe"	Aukerman (music and lyrics); Carrion, Cooper, Stevenson (music)	2:34
5.	"Sour Grapes"	Aukerman, Carrion	3:47
6.	"Get the Time"	Aukerman	3:12

Side B
No.	Title	Writer(s)	Length
1.	"Cheer"	Stevenson	3:01
2.	"80's Girl"	Stevenson	2:15
3.	"Green"	Aukerman, Carrion	3:34
4.	"Days Are Blood"	Aukerman, Carrion, Cooper, Stevenson	7:51
Total length:			31:30

=== CD and cassette versions ===
No.	Title	Writer(s)	Length
1.	"Enjoy"	Milo Aukerman, Doug Carrion, Ray Cooper, Bill Stevenson	2:10
2.	"Wendy" (originally performed by The Beach Boys)	Brian Wilson, Mike Love	2:22
3.	"Kids"	Stevenson	0:44
4.	"Hürtin' Crüe"	Aukerman (music and lyrics); Carrion, Cooper, Stevenson (music)	2:34
5.	"Sour Grapes"	Aukerman, Carrion	3:47
6.	"Get the Time"	Aukerman	3:12
7.	"Orgofart"	Aukerman, Carrion, Cooper, Stevenson	2:18
8.	"Cheer"	Stevenson	3:01
9.	"80's Girl"	Stevenson	2:15
10.	"Green"	Aukerman, Carrion	3:34
11.	"Days Are Blood"	Aukerman, Carrion, Cooper, Stevenson	7:51
12.	"Orgo 51"	Aukerman, Carrion, Cooper, Stevenson	1:20
Total length:			35:08

== Personnel ==
Adapted from the album liner notes.

Band

- Milo Aukerman – vocals
- Ray Cooper – guitar; cover illustrations (as "Scoob Droolins")
- Doug Carrion – bass guitar
- Bill Stevenson – drums, producer, backing vocals on "Green"

Production

- Richard Andrews – recording engineer
- Ethan James – recording engineer

== Notes ==
- I All (1987), Hallraker: Live! (1989), Allroy Sez (1988), Allroy for Prez (1988), and Allroy's Revenge (1989)
