= Jackslacks =

American drummer

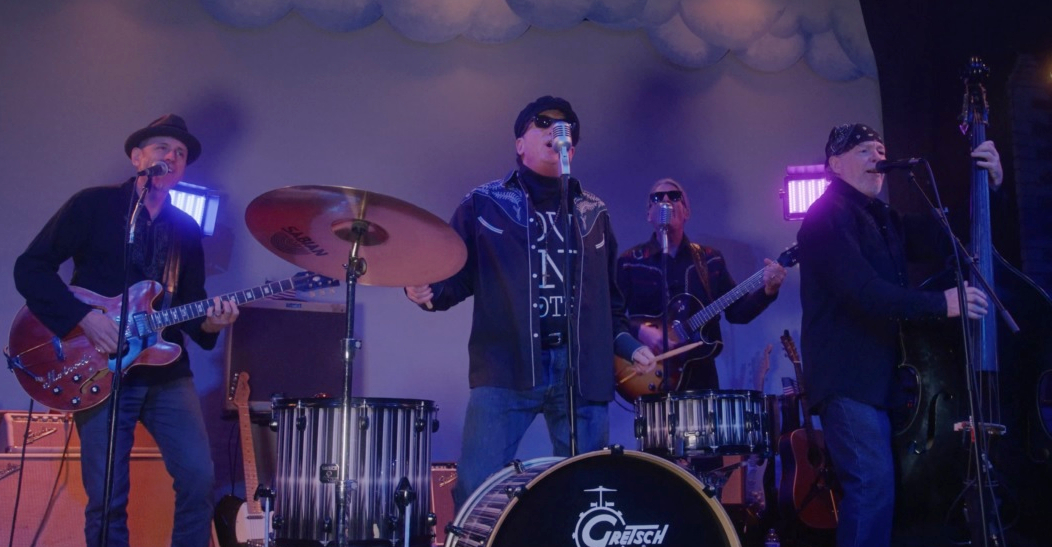
Jackslacks

American rockabilly musician, and author, Chris Giorgio aka Jackslacks adapted his stage name from the Sparkletones 1957 hit song "Black Slacks" and is originally from Valley Stream, Long Island, New York and resides in San Diego, California, United States.

After a brief musical flirtation with both the accordion and guitar, Jackslacks started playing drums in high school, heavily influenced by 1950's rockers DJ Fontana and Jerry Allison, and British Invasion timekeepers Ringo Starr and Charlie Watts. Perhaps more than any of the above-mentioned, Jackslacks has tried to emulate Fontana, who explained his drumming style by saying (paraphrase), "I learned the value of simplicity (at the Hayride), that's why I always play what I feel. If that won't work, I just won't do it again. I think the simple approach comes from my hearing so much big band music. I mixed it with rockabilly."

After graduating from college, Jackslacks honed his chops as a founding member in both Forbidden Pigs (with Billy Bacon) and Hot Rod Lincoln (with Buzz Campbell), popular groups in the early San Diego roots-rock scene, which also included Beat Farmers, The Paladins, and Mojo Nixon. At about the same time, childhood elementary school chum, Tommy Byrnes joined neo rockabilly band Stray Cats on second guitar and backing vocals for a European and US tour concluding at the New Orleans World's Fair, giving Jackslacks the inside track to both the exploding local and increasingly popular national rockabilly revival scenes. Jackslacks CD "Rock and Roll Dinosaur" was produced by Stray Cats slap bassist Lee Rocker and includes Byrnes on guitar, before he went on to play with Joan Jett and the Blackhearts and Rock and Roll Hall of Fame inductee Billy Joel. A huge fan of Sam Phillips Sun Records, Jackslacks arranged the Sun inspired original song "Bank Account's Too Small" on the Hot Rod Lincoln CD "Blue Cafe" which won best local recording at the San Diego Music Awards and whose title track was written for the band by Topcat Brian Setzer.

Jackslacks has long enjoyed a career steeped in rockabilly and roots-rock. He has performed and recorded with many popular players of the genre, sharing the stage with musical hero Carl Perkins, Jerry Lee Lewis and Chuck Berry as well as a who's who list of nationally prominent second generation rockabilly revivalists all across the United States. The Perkins show also featured Detroiter Johnny Powers ("Long Blond Hair"), the first and only recording artist to ever be under contract to both Sun and Motown, while the Jerry Lee show, MC'd by famed gravelly voiced radio DJ Wolfman Jack, showcased a setlist stacked with Sun favorites. Little Richard co-headlined the Chuck Berry performance. According to Jackslacks, "Getting to meet, hang out and open for Carl Perkins has been the highlight of my musical journey so far ... God is good!"

Recent solo work, released on indie label Shield of Love and distributed through Universal Music has received excellent press and gained substantial airplay in the US, Europe and Australia. The 2021 album "Inside Out" concluded a six-week run at #1 on The Roots Music Report's Top Rockabilly Album Chart by finishing number four overall, and featured single "Riff Raff" was the Top Rockabilly Song of the Year. Jackslacks is a member of the Blackcat Rockabilly Europe Hall of Fame.

== Discography ==
- Forbidden Pigs Forbidden Pigs (1987)
- Hot Rod Lincoln Hot Rod Lincoln (1993)
- Nobody's Business Waycool Rock and Roll (1997)
- Johnny Mercury and the Hot Rockets Shake Hands and Shack Up (2000)
- Jackslacks Rock and Roll Dinosaur (2002)
- Jackslacks I'm Just the Drummer Live! (2004)
- Jackslacks The Kind of Girl (2007)
- Dead Engines Crash 'n Burn (2010)
- Jackslacks Lucky Man (2012)
- Jackslacks Farm Jazz (2013)
- Jackslacks Other Side (2014)
- Jackslacks Invisible (2015)
- Jackslacks Earthling Sessions (2018)
- Jackslacks When Pigs Fly (2020)
- Jackslacks Inside Out (2021)
- Jackslacks The Unity Song (2022)
- Jackslacks Love & Unity (2024)
