= Fat (EP) =

Fat EP

EP by the Descendents
- Released: 1981
- Recorded: March 1981
- Studios: Music Lab, Los Angeles
- Genres: Hardcore punk; punk rock
- Length: 4:37
- Label: New Alliance
- Producer: Spot

Descendents chronology
Fat EP (1981)	Milo Goes to College (1982)

The Fat EP is an EP by the American punk rock band the Descendents, released in 1981 through New Alliance Records. It was the band's first recording with singer Milo Aukerman and established their presence in the southern California hardcore punk movement, with short, aggressive songs that represented a shift in style from their previous new wave and surf sound. The EP was re-released in later years as part of several compilation albums.

== Background ==
The Descendents' initial recording lineup of guitarist Frank Navetta, bassist Tony Lombardo, and drummer Bill Stevenson released the band's 1979 debut single "Ride the Wild" / "It's a Hectic World", with a sound that blended Devo-like new wave and Dick Dale-style surf music. Stevenson sold copies of the single to fellow students at Mira Costa High School, attracting the attention of classmate Milo Aukerman, who began attending the band's practices regularly. Aukerman soon became the band's lead singer after jumping in to sing with them at practice.

The addition of Aukerman and the consumption of large amounts of coffee led the band to write shorter, faster and more aggressive songs in a hardcore punk style. Stevenson attributed the change partly to the band's invention of the "Bonus Cup": "We took 1/3 of a cup of instant coffee grounds, added some hot water, threw in about 5 spoonfuls of sugar, and proceeded to play 10 second songs. The Bonus Cup became a part of everyday Descendents life". "Caffeine makes you hyper", said Lombardo, "In general, it makes you want to play faster." Aukerman later recalled: "We started drinking too much coffee; 'cause of that and the addition of me, the music became very quick and all about bursts of energy. It's interesting: we started very melodic, then moved to hardcore, but melded the two at a certain point and became melodic hardcore".

"Mr. Bass"
The EP featured short, fast, aggressive songs in a hardcore punk style, with lyrics describing food and fishing. "Mr. Bass" tells of Navetta, Stevenson and McCuistion fishing for bass on Stevenson's boat, the Orca.

Another factor influencing the band's style was the concept of "All", invented by Stevenson and friend Pat McCuistion during a late-night fishing trip on Stevenson's boat, the Orca. According to Aukerman: "While drinking all this coffee in the midst of catching mackerel they came up with the concept of All — doing the utmost, achieving the utmost. The more they got into it the more it turned into their own religion; it's partly humor, but it's also an outlook on how to conduct your life: to not settle for some, to always go for All". Stevenson described the concept of "All" as "the total extent", and recalled that "the quest for All became the main catalyst of the band, and we adopted this omni-ambitious way of life, for better and for better". He and McCuistion quickly wrote several very short songs that would later be recorded by the Descendents:

Pat insisted that we quit writing "stupid girl songs", and start writing about things that really matter — like food and fishing. So he and I wrote "Weinerschnitzel", "All", and "No, All!" in a fit of Allular frustration. The songs were only seconds long, but that was all the time we needed to make the point. We temporarily put aside all of our so-called "girl songs" and recorded the Fat EP. This is the only record we ever made without a single love song on it.

Of these songs, "Weinerschnitzel" was used on the Fat EP while "All" and "No, All!" were later recorded for the 1987 album All. "I just decided to not write normal songs", recalled Stevenson. "'I Like Food' and 'Weinerschnitzel', I thought that was the way of the future, like 'yeah, these songs are more cool than normal songs'".

== Recording, themes, and releases ==
We were real fat people. I weighed about 240 pounds, and Frank weighed about 190 pounds. We would eat hamburgers and stuff. People thought "Oh, they do this funny thing", but we were really into that. I wrote that song about going to Der Weinerschnitzel because we were all into it.

— Bill Stevenson

The Fat EP was recorded in March 1981 at Music Lab studios in Hollywood with producer Spot, and was released later that year by New Alliance Records. "Weinerschnitzel", titled after the fast-food chain, is the shortest song on the EP at 10 seconds, with Lombardo playing the role of the restaurant's counterman while Aukerman shouts his food order at him. The 16-second "I Like Food" also takes food as its topic, with Aukerman shouting out the names of various foodstuffs. Several other songs about food were written, but did not make it onto the EP. "We were never organized enough to have concepts", recalled Stevenson in 2013. "The fact of the matter is that I was 250 pounds and obsessed with chili burgers and stuff. And Frank was a little overweight at the time, too. So we were embracing our gluttony". "Mr. Bass" tells the story of a bass being caught during a fishing trip on board the Orca and being mounted on the fisherman's wall. Navetta drew the illustrations for the front and back cover of the EP.

Following its initial release on New Alliance, the EP was reissued in several versions and as part of compilation albums over the next 10 years. In 1985, New Alliance re-released it as part of the Bonus Fat compilation, pairing it with the tracks from "Ride the Wild" / "It's a Hectic World" and "Global Probing" from a New Alliance/SST Records compilation titled Chunks. In 1987, New Alliance was sold to SST, who re-released Bonus Fat on EP, cassette and compact disc. In 1988, it was paired with the band's debut album Milo Goes to College as Two Things at Once. "My Dad Sucks", "I Like Food", and "Weinerschnitzel" were also included on the 1991 career retrospective Somery.

== Reception ==
Music journalist and culture critic Greil Marcus used the Fat EP as the introduction to his "Food Fight: Real Life Rock Top Ten 1981", remarking that "if a more perfect disc has appeared this year, I haven't heard it". Rock critic Robert Christgau called it a "punk classic", praising the short, fast songs and calling "Weinerschnitzel" "their masterpiece, eleven seconds of dialogue augmented by two guitar blams. All of the fifty or so listeners I've subjected to it have had the same basic response: 'Play it again, willya?'" Ned Raggett of AllMusic gave the EP 3 stars out of 5, calling it "quick, immediate, goofy, fun" and "a hyperspeed trashing of modern youth Kultur circa 1981".

== Cover versions ==
In the decades since its release, several artists have recorded cover versions of songs from the Fat EP. For the Descendents tribute album Homage: Lots of Bands Doing Descendents' Songs (1995), Squatweiler with Asteroid Wilhanna covered "I Like Food" while Drew covered "Hey Hey". Manic Hispanic recorded a parody version of "Weinerschnitzel", titled "Alberto's", for their album The Recline of Mexican Civilization (2001). Taking Back Sunday covered "I Like Food" on the Tony Hawk's American Wasteland soundtrack (2005). Less Than Jake referenced "Weinerschnitzel" on their song "Channel 4" from TV/EP (2010).

== Track listing ==
Side A
No.	Title	Writer(s)	Length
1.	"My Dad Sucks"	Frank Navetta, Tony Lombardo	0:35
2.	"Mr. Bass"	Navetta	2:05

Side B
No.	Title	Writer(s)	Length
1.	"I Like Food"	Bill Stevenson	0:16
2.	"Hey Hey"	Lombardo	1:31
3.	"Weinerschnitzel"	Stevenson, Pat McCuistion	0:10
Total length:			4:37

== Personnel ==
Band

- Milo Aukerman – vocals
- Frank Navetta – guitar, cover illustrations
- Tony Lombardo – bass guitar
- Bill Stevenson – drums

Production

- Spot – producer, engineer
