= Billy Hancock =

- Birth name: William C. Hancock Jr.
- Born: November 4, 1946; Alexandria, Virginia, United States
- Died: January 22, 2018 (aged 71); La Plata, Maryland, United States
- Genres: Rock and roll, rockabilly, blues, jazz, R&B, country
- Occupation(s): Vocalist, multi-instrumentalist
- Instrument(s): Guitar, bass
- Years active: 1962–2018
- Website: www.billyhancock.com www.myspace.com/billyhancockmusic

William C. Hancock Jr. (November 4, 1946 – January 22, 2018) was an American singer, guitarist, bassist and multi-instrumental recording artist. He has made numerous recordings, primarily in the rockabilly genre but also has a large body of recorded work in rock 'n' roll, blues, jazz, rhythm & blues, and country music. He performed live primarily in the Washington, D.C., area, but also played regularly at European roots music festivals.

== Early life ==
Hancock was born in Washington, D.C., and raised in Alexandria, Virginia, where he has lived most of his life. He attended George Washington High School in Alexandria, graduating in 1964. He came from a musical family. His maternal grandmother Katie sang with Minstrel shows in black face accompanying herself on piano and harmonica. Two of his aunts Eileen and Anita were a singing duo in the 1940s who sang at two or three Washington DC radios stations on a regular basis. His paternal grandfather Mitchell (Mitch) Hancock played mandolin from about 1897 until 1902. He often played on River Boats in New Orleans and recorded for the Edison Label. Billy's father worked for the Southern Railway and his mother worked for Waxie Maxie's, a local record store chain, and other record stores. The records his mother brought home from work, primarily rhythm and blues from the late 1940s, played a large and influential role in his musical development.

== Career ==
Hancock began his career playing in bands around Washington, D.C., while still a teenager. After graduating from high school, he played with bands in Rhode Island and New York before returning to the Washington area. In 1968, he moved to Baltimore to attend the Peabody Conservatory, and continued to play in bands in the Baltimore area.

In the early 1970s, Hancock began a collaboration with Danny Gatton and they formed Danny and the Fat Boys with Hancock (bass, vocals), Gatton (guitars), and Dave Elliott (drums, vocals). In 1975, the group released American Music on a label owned by Hancock and his brother. The album's title was taken from a rhythm and blues song Hancock had written. It was later re-issued on CD.

In 1978, Hancock recorded four rockabilly songs under the name Billy Hancock and the Tennessee Rockets for Ripsaw Records, a small independent label. He continued to record rockabilly for Ripsaw under that name for two years. Ripsaw released four singles during that time and licensed those and other titles to larger labels both in the U.S. and France. It is these rockabilly recordings for which Hancock is known internationally.

In 1983, Hancock recorded another rockabilly record, "Hey! Little Rock And Roller", that was released in France on the Big Beat Label. Later that year, he returned to Ripsaw to record various rock and roll songs, six of which Ripsaw released in 1985. All of the Ripsaw material was later released on CDs by Finnish Bluelight Records.

Throughout his career, Hancock played in backing bands for prominent musicians, including Fats Domino, Gene Vincent, blues guitarist Roy Buchanan, rockabilly Charlie Feathers, the Clovers, Amos Milburn, and country musicians Dottie West and Jean Shepard. He co-produced and played guitar on Tex Rubinowitz's rockabilly song "Hot Rod Man."

In 2002, Hancock and his brother the television director, Dale Hancock founded Turkey Mountain Records, an independent record label. The label was formed to find and promote talented artists of all genres who, for whatever reasons, have been ignored by other record labels. Their Archival Series re-released material on artists of the past whose works have been unavailable until now. Turkey Mountain Records' roster of artists included: Danny Gatton, The British Walkers (featuring Roy Buchanan), Bobbie (The Kid) Howard with Link Wray and The Ray Men, Charlie Feathers, The Fallen Angels, and Billy Hancock himself.

In 2005, the Washington Area Music Association WAMA awarded Hancock a Special Recognition Award for his 40-plus years as a vocalist, musician, songwriter, producer, promoter, and label owner. In 2006, WAMA presented him with two "Wammie" awards for 2005 Roots Rock Vocalist and Roots Rock Recording. In 2012, WAMA presented Hancock as one of "The Fallen Angels" a special recognition award.

In 2010, Hancock was inducted into the Southern Legends Hall of Fame. He is already a member of three other International Halls of Fame.

Hancock was also the television host for American Music in Arlington, Virginia, where he interviewed and showcased songwriters and a music historian.

He was also a member of the resurrected art rock group from the sixties, The Fallen Angels.

On 4 November 2012 Hancock was inducted into The Northern Virginia Blues Society, Blues Hall of Fame in Manassas, Va.

== Discography ==
- 1975 - American Music
- 1981 - Rockabilly Fever
- 1981 - Shakin' That Rockabilly Fever
- 1983 - Hey! Little Rock and Roller
- 1985 - Wanted: True Rock 'n' Roll
- 1988 - Vintage Masters
- 1997 - American Music
- 2000 - Live at Colonial Beach
- 2000 - Shakin' That Rockabilly Fever
- 2002 - On the Jazz
- 2003 - Wanted: True Rock 'n' Roll
- 2005 - Billy Hancock & the Tennessee Rockets Live!
- 2005 - Passions
- 2006 - Birth of a Billy: Anthology
- 2008 - Out of the Darkness
- 2010 - Rockabilly Fans Only “The Lost Tapes”
- 2011 - Anthology Volume Two
