= All (Descendents album) =

Studio album by the Descendents
- Released: June 1987
- Recorded: January 1987
- Studios: Radio Tokyo, Los Angeles
- Genre: Punk rock
- Length: 36:38
- Label: SST
- Producer: Bill Stevenson

Descendents chronology
Enjoy! (1986)	All (1987)	Liveage! (1987)

All is the fourth album by the American punk rock band the Descendents, released in 1987 through SST Records. It was the band's first album with bassist Karl Alvarez and guitarist Stephen Egerton, who brought new songwriting ideas to the group. The album is titled after the concept of "All" invented by drummer Bill Stevenson and friend Pat McCuistion in 1980. Based on the goals of achieving "the total extent" and "to not settle for some, to always go for All", the philosophy was the subject of the one-second title track, the two-second "No, All!", and "All-O-Gistics".

All marked the end of the Descendents' original run. Following two tours of the United States to promote the album, singer Milo Aukerman left the group to pursue a career in biochemistry. The band was relaunched under the new name All, and released eight albums with other singers between 1988 and 1995, before reuniting with Aukerman under the Descendents name.

== Background ==
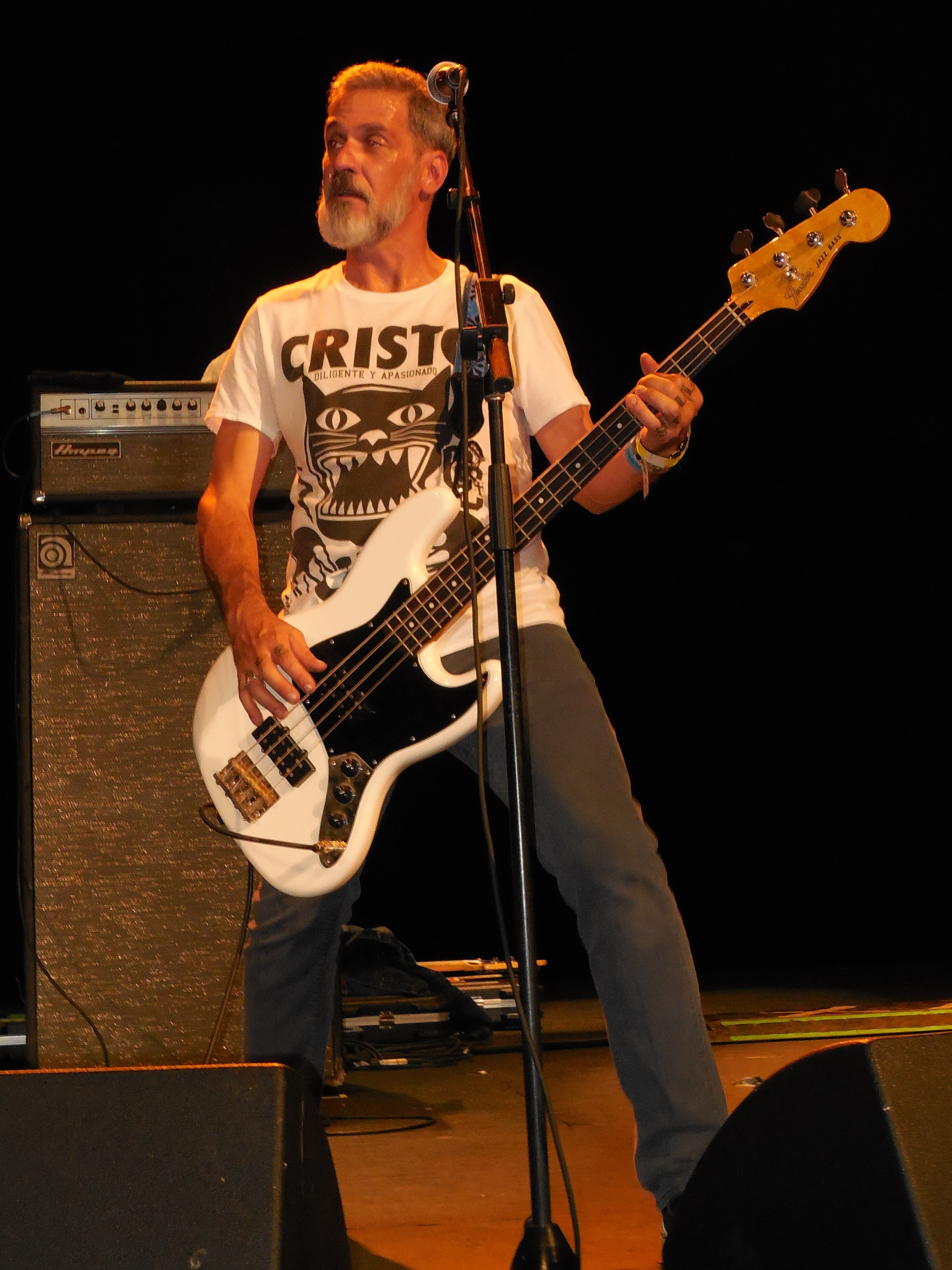
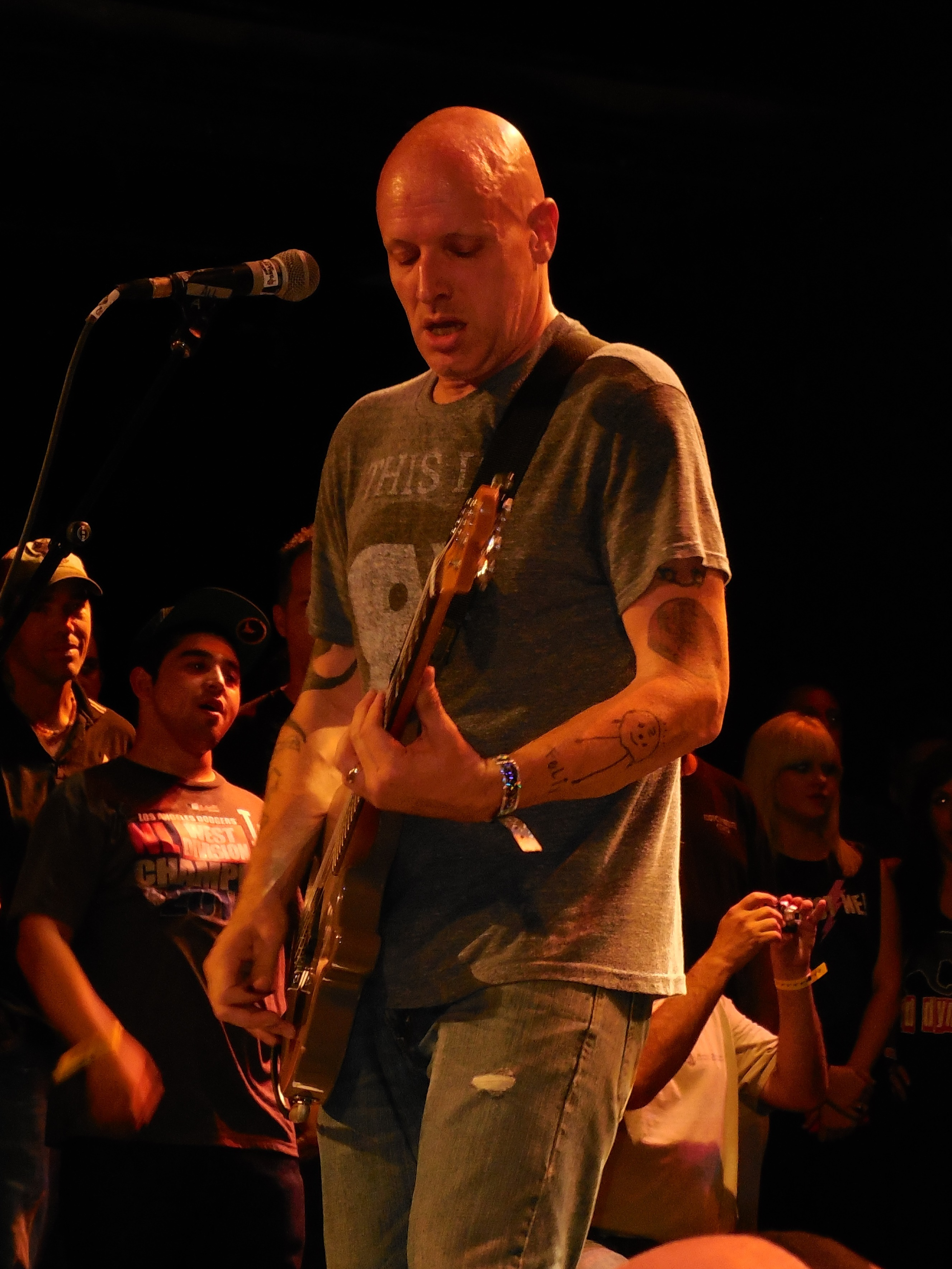
All was the band's first album with Karl Alvarez (left) and Stephen Egerton (right), who brought new musical ideas to the group.

Following the Descendents' summer 1986 tour in support of their third album, Enjoy!, guitarist Ray Cooper and bassist Doug Carrion left the band. Seeking a new bassist, drummer Bill Stevenson contacted a musician he knew in Boise, Idaho. The musician declined but suggested Salt Lake City native Karl Alvarez, whose band the Bad Yodelers was staying with him at the time while on tour. Stevenson had met Alvarez in 1984 while touring with Black Flag, and invited him to try out with the Descendents. Packing all his belongings in a garbage bag, Alvarez took a train from Salt Lake City to Los Angeles and began rehearsing with Stevenson. According to singer Milo Aukerman, Alvarez and Stevenson "just locked in completely." "I think Billy and I had a certain connection," recalled Alvarez, "but I can't help but think 'Well, yeah, because I practiced bass to his records.'"

Guitarist Stephen Egerton called to congratulate Alvarez on joining the Descendents; the two had been friends since 1976, learned to play guitar together, had played in the Salt Lake City hardcore punk band Massacre Guys, and were both big Descendents fans. Knowing the band needed a guitarist, Alvarez recommended Egerton, who was living in Washington, D.C. at the time. Stevenson also knew Egerton through touring; Egerton had been a tour promoter for Black Flag and the Minutemen when they had played Salt Lake City in 1984. Egerton came to Los Angeles and practiced with the band for a few days, officially joining on Stevenson's birthday of September 10. After settling his affairs in Washington, D.C., he moved to Los Angeles that October. He and Alvarez moved into the Descendents' headquarters, a storefront along the Pacific Coast Highway in Lomita, California that housed the band's living quarters, practice space, and office. Egerton later recalled:

For me, meeting Bill, beyond my massive love for the Descendents' music, was my massive love for Black Flag's music, and he had been in both. So the idea that it was Karl, my oldest friend, and I joining this band that was so huge to us, it was like living on a cloud. We were like "Uh, what just happened? Uh, we just joined the Descendents. This is gnarly."

After practicing for a few weeks, the Descendents headed out on the second Enjoy! tour from late November 1986 to mid-January 1987, playing small shows for little money and sleeping on people's floors. "Those first tours were very grueling in the way that it is when you're not used to it", recalled Alvarez. On their return to Los Angeles they began writing songs for the band's next album.

== Writing ==
"Clean Sheets"
Bill Stevenson awoke one morning with the chorus of "Clean Sheets" fully formed in his mind, and said the finished song exactly matched what he had heard in his head in that moment.

"All-O-Gistics"
"All-O-Gistics" uses start/stop pacing, with occasional breaks into faster sections. Over background chanting, Aukerman delivers a sermon with commandments on how to achieve "All".

As with previous Descendents albums, all four band members contributed to the songwriting of the new record. With their shared history and eclectic musical tastes, Alvarez and Egerton brought new ideas to the band. "We already had a kind of highly evolved vocabulary of licks and riffs", recalled Alvarez. Egerton remembered "What was interesting about putting that band together at that time was that there were two already functioning chemistries that existed: Milo and Bill, and me and Karl." "They had all these really cool experimental, instrumental deals going", recalled Aukerman. "Stephen came in with these crazy songs, this kind of King Crimson-eque thing, and I was like 'ooh, okay.'"

Alvarez wrote "Coolidge", which deals with a failed relationship and the realization that "I'm not a cool guy anymore, as if I ever was before". "That's proven to be one of our identifying songs", said Stevenson 26 years later, "Here he is, new to the band, he walks in and writes one of the songs that would define us." Egerton's contributions were primarily instrumental; he wrote the music for "Impressions", "Iceman", "All-O-Gistics", and "Schizophrenia", and co-wrote the music for "Van" and "Uranus". "Stephen harnessed the job of trying to expand some of the melodic boundaries", said Stevenson. "He would kind of come up with what I would call the nasty chords."

Stevenson's "Clean Sheets" and he and Aukerman's "Pep Talk" also dealt with themes of broken relationships. According to Stevenson, the chorus of "Clean Sheets" came to him fully formed one morning as he was waking up: "'Even though you'll never come clean, you know it's true / Those sheets are dirty, and so are you', that was a complete thought: a melody, lyrics, and chords in my head. The way you hear it on the record, I heard that when I woke up. I didn't strum around or plink around, it was just like 'Oh, that's Clean Sheets'. It's done." Aukerman's lyrics for "Iceman" were loosely based on the 1946 play The Iceman Cometh by Eugene O'Neill.

I'm really into "ALL" and I've waited a long time to unleash the whole concept on people. And now I'm going to do it [...] It's just a way of thinking, in which there are extremes and there is this goal called "ALL". It's a way that I created in dealing with achievement and satisfaction and how the two relate. Basically just to avoid stagnation... going for "ALL" and never being satisfied and just wallowing in your own sameness.

— Bill Stevenson, June 1987

The album was titled after the concept of "All", which Stevenson and his friend Pat McCuistion had invented during a fishing trip on Stevenson's boat Orca in 1980. According to Aukerman, "While drinking all this coffee in the midst of catching mackerel they came up with the concept of All — doing the utmost, achieving the utmost. The more they got into it the more it turned into their own religion; it's partly humor, but it's also an outlook on how to conduct your life: to not settle for some, to always go for All." Stevenson described the concept of "All" as "the total extent", and he and McCuistion had quickly written several short songs "in a fit of Allular frustration", two of which were recorded for All: "All" and "No, All!". "The songs were only seconds long, but that was all the time we needed to make the point", he said. McCuistion also shared writing credit on "All-O-Gistics", a musical set of commandments for achieving All, such as "Thou shalt not commit adulthood", "Thou shalt not partake of decaf", and "Thou shalt not suppress flatulence". "Stephen had those chords, and I wrote my own religion for his chords", said Stevenson.

== Recording, artwork, and release ==
All was recorded in January 1987 at Radio Tokyo studios in Venice, Los Angeles with recording engineer Richard Andrews, who had recorded Enjoy! Stevenson served as record producer, and later said that of the Descendents' first five studio albums he felt only Milo Goes to College (1982) came closer than All to authentically capturing the band's sound. Dez Cadena of Black Flag and the DC3 sang backing vocals on the album. Stevenson created the cover graphics, while Alvarez provided illustrations for the sleeve and liner notes. One of Alvarez's illustrations was of the "Bassmaster General", a character previously mentioned in the Enjoy! song "Kids" who again turns up in the lyrics of "All-O-Gistics" as a higher power guiding the band in their quest for All.

The Descendents' previous albums had been released through New Alliance Records; however, following the death of label co-founder D. Boon New Alliance was sold to SST Records in 1987. SST released All and also re-released all of the Descendents' previous albums. All was released as an 11-song LP and a 13-song cassette and CD, the latter two containing the additional tracks "Jealous of the World" and "Uranus".

== Supporting tours and Aukerman's departure ==
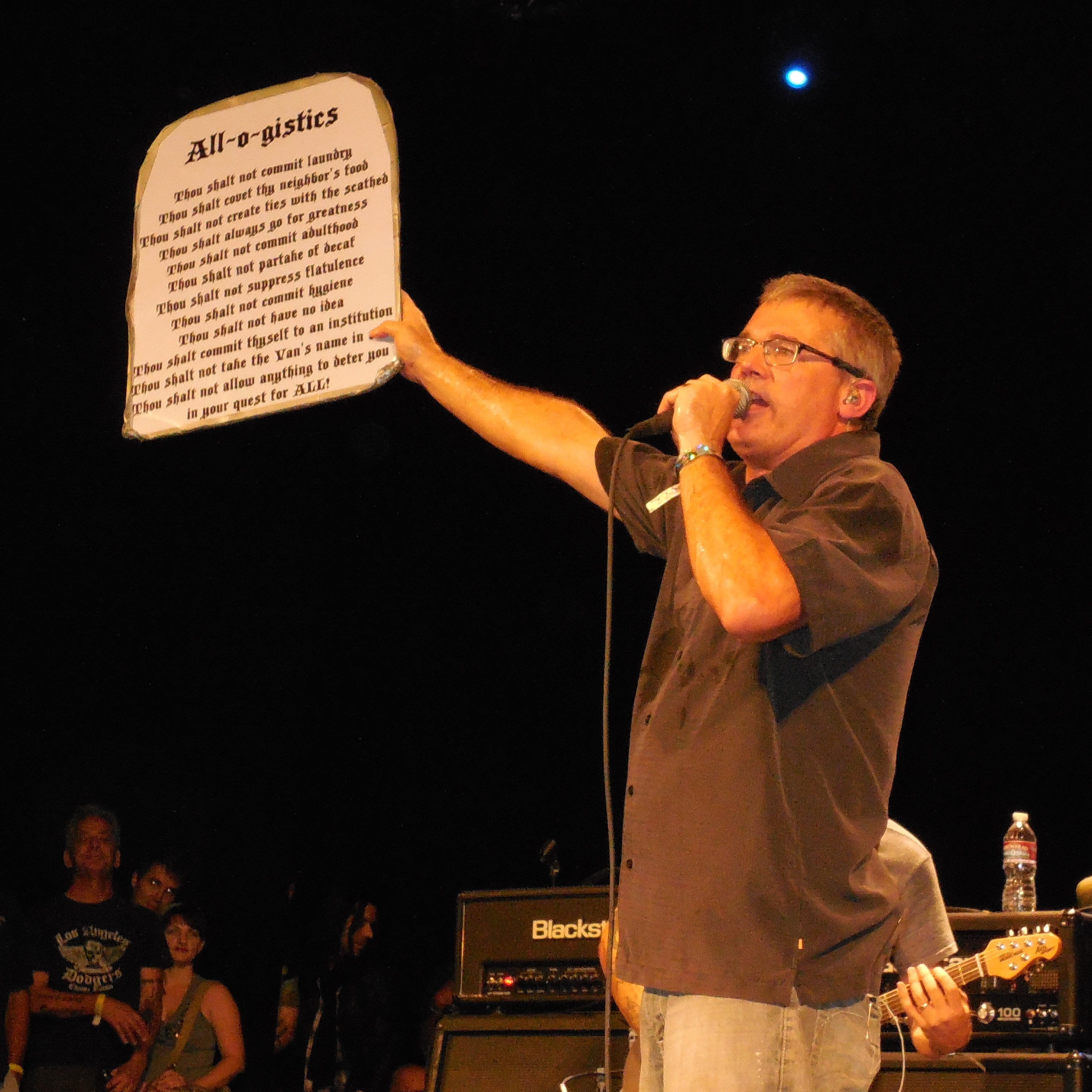
Since 1987 it has been common for Aukerman to hold up a sign displaying the "All-O-Gistics" when performing the song, as seen here in 2014.

The band supported the album with a 60-day spring 1987 tour from mid-February to mid-April that took them through the Southwestern and Southern United States, up the East Coast, into Canada to Montreal and Hamilton, then snaking westward through the Northern and Central United States before making their way northwest to Calgary and Vancouver, and finally down the West Coast of the United States back to Los Angeles; covering 29 states and 4 Canadian provinces with a total of 44 shows in 41 cities. This was followed by the 50-day summer "FinALL" tour from mid-May through the end of July, following much the same route and covering 28 states and 2 provinces, with 47 shows in 44 cities. Recordings of the band's performances on April 9 at Berkeley Square in Berkeley, California and July 13 at First Avenue in Minneapolis, Minnesota were released as the live albums Liveage! (1987) and Hallraker: Live! (1989).

The "FinALL" tour was so-called due to Aukerman's decision to leave the band to pursue postgraduate education in microbiology. "The band was fun, but I hadn't achieved All, basically, in music or in science, and I had the opportunity to go try to achieve All more in science, and I decided to take that opportunity", he later reflected, adding that he had always considered music a hobby and science as his career, and "the more the music started to seem like a career, the less I seemed to like it. In '87 I left the band and we did the final tour. There wasn't one of these things like 'Well, I'm gonna do this for a while and come back to the band.' It was more like 'I'm embarking on my life's career to do this.'" "I toured him to death," said Stevenson. "We did all those tours in a row and he's like 'I gotta go focus on my studies and do something real.' I mean, we were making five or ten dollars per day in our pocket and that's it. We had nowhere to live, and you could see where a guy with the kind of brainpower he has would say 'You know what? I don't have to sleep next to Bill's drum set in the practice room.'"

With Aukerman's departure announced in advance, Stevenson took the opportunity to relaunch the band afresh under the name All with singer Dave Smalley, formerly of the Washington, D.C. hardcore band Dag Nasty, meaning for the new band to be the complete fulfillment of the "All" concept. "I've been wanting to change the name of the band to ALL for eight years", he said during the FinALL tour, adding that it would not feel right to continue as the Descendents without Aukerman and that he wished to shelve the name in case he and Aukerman should wish to use it again at some point. On December 16, 1987, during the recording of the first All album Allroy Sez, Pat McCuistion died when his fishing boat sank during a storm. Stevenson remarked that "He had 15,000 pounds of fish onboard, so I guess you could say he died in heated pursuit of All. He was always the '5th member' of the band, besides being my best friend, next to Milo." With Smalley and later singers Scott Reynolds and the Chad Price, All released eight albums between 1988 and 1995, with Aukerman contributing occasional songwriting and backing vocals. In 1995 Aukerman would return to record Everything Sucks with the band under the Descendents name.

== Reception ==
Mike DaRonco of AllMusic wrote: "With this record, not only are they forgiven for the bad spots to be found on here — it's not like they can't be skipped over — but their last release (Enjoy!) will be forgotten." He remarked that the relationship-themed songs "prove that the most creative music comes out of personal tragedy" and called it a felony that "Pep Talk" was not included on the band's 1991 "best of" compilation Somery. By contrast, DaRonco's colleague Jason Ankeny referred to All as "lackluster" in his biography of the band. Jenny Eliscu of Rolling Stone praised several of the album's songs as being among the Descendents' best work: "All is often underrated because of the strange pseudo-arty instrumental tracks on its second half; nonetheless, the album features three of the band's best songs, 'Cameage', 'Coolidge', and 'Clean Sheets'. The subjects are perennial, but [the band's] sophistication as lyricist[s] has grown. 'Coolidge' is about accepting one's uncoolness, and 'Clean Sheets' talks of being forced to sleep on the floor after a lover's infidelity sullies the sheets."

== Cover versions ==
In the decades since its release, several artists have recorded cover versions of songs from All for other releases. Swedish punk band Millencolin covered "Coolidge" on their Skauch EP (1994). For the Descendents tribute album Homage: Lots of Bands Doing Descendents' Songs (1995), Garden Variety covered "Clean Sheets", Parasites covered "Pep Talk", Peepshow covered "Coolidge", the Teen Idols covered "Cameage", and Meatjack covered "Iceman". For Milo Turns 50: Songs of the Descendents (2013), The Henry Clay People covered "Clean Sheets", Yacht covered "All" and Beatsteaks covered "Clean Sheets".

== Track listing ==
LP version Side A
No.	Title	Lyrics	Music	Length
1.	"All"	Bill Stevenson, Pat McCuistion	Stevenson, McCuistion	0:01
2.	"Coolidge"	Karl Alvarez	Alvarez	2:35
3.	"No, All!"	Stevenson, McCuistion	Stevenson, McCuistion	0:02
4.	"Van"	Milo Aukerman	Alvarez, Stephen Egerton	2:55
5.	"Cameage"	Stevenson	Stevenson	2:49
6.	"Impressions"	Aukerman	Egerton	3:02
7.	"Iceman"	Aukerman	Egerton	3:05

Side B
No.	Title	Lyrics	Music	Length
1.	"Clean Sheets"	Stevenson	Stevenson	3:09
2.	"Pep Talk"	Stevenson, Aukerman	Aukerman	3:00
3.	"All-O-Gistics"	Stevenson, McCuistion	Egerton	3:00
4.	"Schizophrenia"	Aukerman	Egerton	6:46
Total length:				30:24

CD and cassette versions
No.	Title	Lyrics	Music	Length
1.	"All"	Bill Stevenson, Pat McCuistion	Stevenson, McCuistion	0:01
2.	"Coolidge"	Karl Alvarez	Alvarez	2:35
3.	"No, All!"	Stevenson, McCuistion	Stevenson, McCuistion	0:02
4.	"Van"	Milo Aukerman	Alvarez, Stephen Egerton	2:55
5.	"Cameage"	Stevenson	Stevenson	2:49
6.	"Impressions"	Aukerman	Egerton	3:02
7.	"Iceman"	Aukerman	Egerton	3:05
8.	"Jealous of the World"	Aukerman	Aukerman	4:00
9.	"Clean Sheets"	Stevenson	Stevenson	3:09
10.	"Pep Talk"	Stevenson, Aukerman	Aukerman	3:00
11.	"All-O-Gistics"	Stevenson, McCuistion	Egerton	3:00
12.	"Schizophrenia"	Aukerman	Egerton	6:46
13.	"Uranus"	instrumental	Alvarez, Aukerman, Egerton, Stevenson	2:14
Total length:				36:38

== Personnel ==
Adapted from the album liner notes.

Band

- Milo Aukerman – vocals
- Stephen Egerton – guitar
- Karl Alvarez – bass guitar, drawings
- Bill Stevenson – drums, producer, cover graphics

Additional performers

- Dez Cadena – backing vocals

Production

- Richard Andrews – engineer
