= Bill Holloman =

American jazz musician

Bill Holloman (born c.1956) is an American jazz and blues tenor saxophonist, piano and trumpet player.

Holloman featured in the bands of Nile Rodgers (Chic), Larry Gatlin and the Gatlin Brothers and alongside Danny Gatton. He has performed many times at the Montreal International Jazz Festival and has also recorded or performed with artists such as Bruce Springsteen, Paul Simon, Slash, Elton John, Steven Tyler, Simon Le Bon, Patti LaBelle, Diana Ross and Les Paul. Holloman is also noted for his recordings with top American television network shows including HBO, CBS and ESPN, notably NASCAR. He shares an Emmy Award for the HBO Sports documentary Legendary Nights.

Holloman is featured on Beasties: a Sci-fi Rock Opera concept record on vocals, instrumentation, and orchestration. The show and the songs for the show were written by Gary Sohmers of Antiques Roadshow (American TV program) fame. The concept record was released in early 2020 in the form of YouTube videos. Three books about the rock opera, from the viewpoint of different characters from the show, were released in 2020.
