= Bad Boy (Robert Gordon album) =

Studio album by Robert Gordon
- Released: 1980
- Genre: Rockabilly
- Label: RCA
- Producer: Richard Gottehrer, Robert Gordon

Robert Gordon chronology
Rock Billy Boogie (1979)	Bad Boy (1980)	Are You Gonna Be the One (1981)

Bad Boy is an album by the American musician Robert Gordon, released in 1980. It peaked at No. 150 on the Billboard 200. The cover of Joe Brown's "A Picture of You" was released as a single in England.

== Production ==
The album was produced by Richard Gottehrer and Gordon, who also wrote "Born to Lose". Gordon was backed by his bands the Wildcats and the New Cats, which included Tony Garnier on upright bass. He used a double echo on some of the tracks. "Bad Boy" is a cover of the Marty Wilde song. "Crazy Man Crazy" was written by Bill Haley. "Sweet Love on My Mind" is a version of the Johnny Burnette song. "Torture" was written by John D. Loudermilk. "Uptown" is a cover of the Roy Orbison song. "Is It Wrong (For Loving You)" is a version of the song made famous by Warner Mack.

== Critical reception ==
Professional ratings
Review scores
Source	Rating
AllMusic	3/5 stars
Robert Christgau	C+
The Columbian	2.5/4 stars
Daily Times-Advocate	8/10
The Encyclopedia of Popular Music	2/5 stars
Houston Chronicle	4/5 stars
MusicHound Rock: The Essential Album Guide	3/5 stars
Pittsburgh Post-Gazette	C+
The New Rolling Stone Record Guide	1/5 stars

The Lincoln Journal Star called Gordon "too posed and studied to come across with any emotional affect, which, after all, is the main attraction of rockabilly." The Columbian admired the playing of guitarist Chris Spedding. The Hartford Courant praised the title track, saying that "it has a kind of shy charm that makes it one of the record's best tunes." The Houston Chronicle noted that Gordon "seems more like the real thing, and less like an imitator." The Daily Record opined that, "if he hasn't reached a musical dead end yet, he's almost there." The Kansas City Star said that "Gordon delivers most of the songs with all the feeling of a wooden dummy." Robert Christgau concluded, "As our increased familiarity and his increased facility reduce his dependence on ironic context, he becomes unnecessary—totally unnecessary, I mean."

Dave Marsh, in The New Rolling Stone Record Guide, considered Gordon to be "well-intentioned but inept." The Trouser Press Record Guide panned the "schlockier songs".

== Track listing ==
No.	Title	Length
1.	"Sweet Love on My Mind"
2.	"The Worrying Kind"
3.	"Bad Boy"
4.	"A Picture of You"
5.	"Torture"
6.	"Crazy Man Crazy"
7.	"Born to Lose"
8.	"Nervous"
9.	"Uptown"
10.	"Is It Wrong (For Loving You)"
11.	"Need You"

== Charts ==
Chart	Peak position
US Billboard 200	150
