= Robert Gordon (singer) =

American singer and musician (1947–2022)

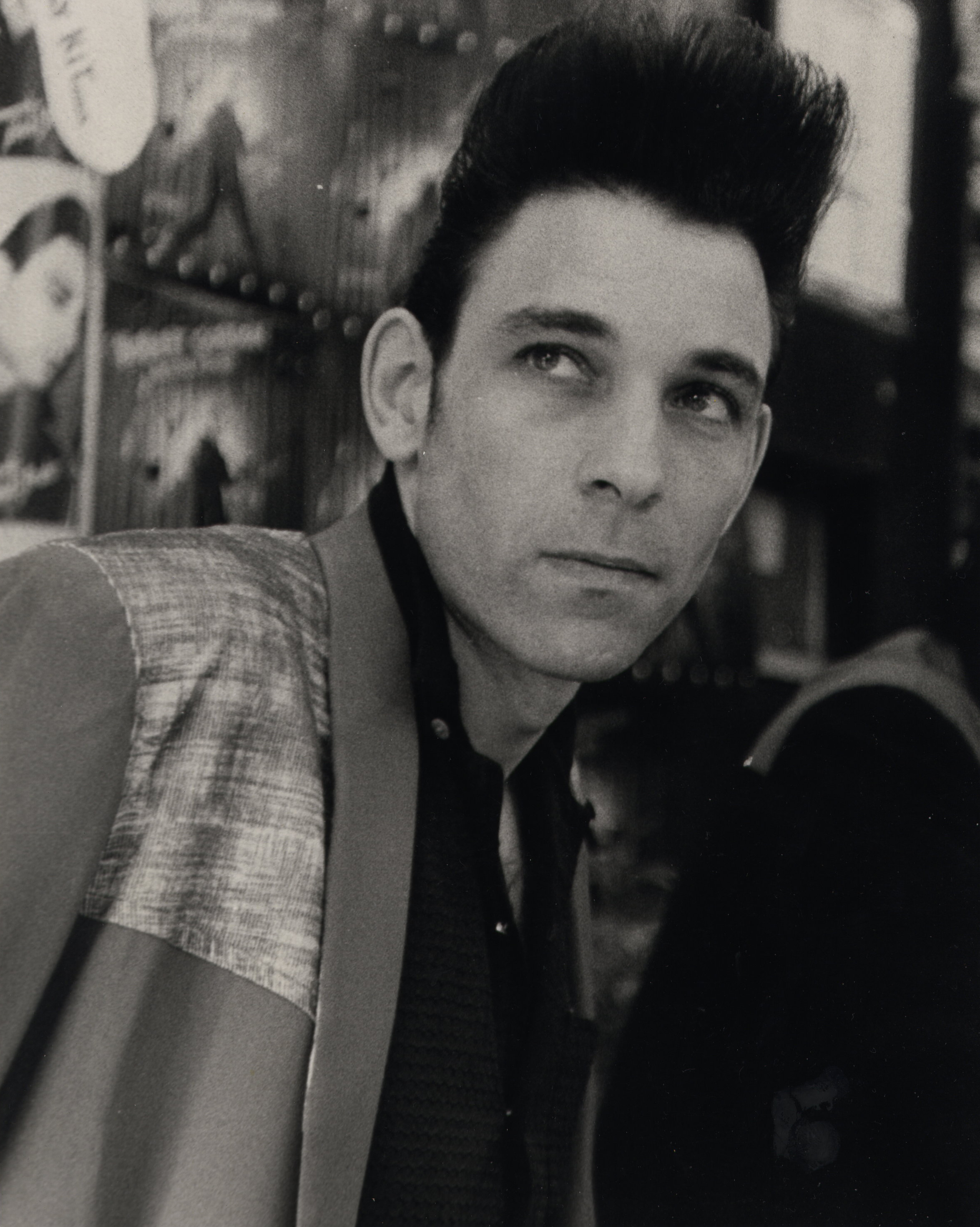
- Gordon in 1979

Background information
- Born: Robert Ira Gordon; March 29, 1947; Bethesda, Maryland, U.S.
- Died: October 18, 2022 (aged 75) New York City, New York, U.S.
- Genre: Rockabilly
- Occupation: Musician
- Instrument: Vocals
- Years active: 1976–2022
- Labels: Private Stock, RCA Records, Viceroy, Llist, Jungle, Rykodisc, Lanark, Cleopatra
- Formerly of: Tuff Darts, Link Wray, The Heartbreakers, Danny Gatton, Chris Spedding
- Website: robertgordon.dk

Robert Gordon (March 29, 1947 – October 18, 2022) was an American rockabilly singer.

== Early life ==
Gordon grew up in Bethesda, Maryland, United States, the son of Arlene and Samuel Gordon, an administrative law judge. His family was Jewish.

At the age of nine, Gordon was greatly inspired by the Elvis Presley song "Heartbreak Hotel" playing on radio and decided to pursue a career as a rock and roll musician at that young age.

== Music career ==
=== Influences and early career ===
Along with Elvis Presley, Gordon's influences during his childhood and teenage years included Gene Vincent and Eddie Cochran among other notable rock 'n roll music artists of the period.

Gordon made his recording debut at age 17 in 1964 with a group called the Confidentials. He also actively performed with the Newports in his teenage years. At the age of 19 he got married, and shortly after had two children.

When asked how he related to the 1960s, Gordon replied "I didn't." He did not care much for the British Invasion but he identified with soul singers such as James Brown and Otis Redding whom he saw, among other great R&B acts, performing at Washington, D.C.'s famous Howard Theatre. During the turbulent times of the late 1960s, with the rioting and antiwar protests of the period, Gordon served in the National Guard in Washington, D.C. "I didn't want to be sent to Vietnam," he recalls.

=== Punk rock ===
By 1970, Gordon had relocated his family to New York City with the intent of operating a clothing boutique. His focus shifted to the punk rock scene at the nightclub CBGB. He became a member of the punk-pop band Tuff Darts.

During 1976, the Tuff Darts recorded "All for the Love of Rock and Roll", "Head over Heels", and "Slash" for a compilation album called Live at CBGB's, which included a number of other local New York City bands. Gordon also appeared in a punk/new wave–style film entitled Unmade Beds, an homage to Jean-Luc Godard by underground filmmaker Amos Poe. Blondie lead singer Deborah Harry and painter Duncan Hannah also appeared in the film.

In November of 1976, Gordon briefly sang with the Heartbreakers, and appeared on an unreleased demo tape.

=== Rockabilly revival ===
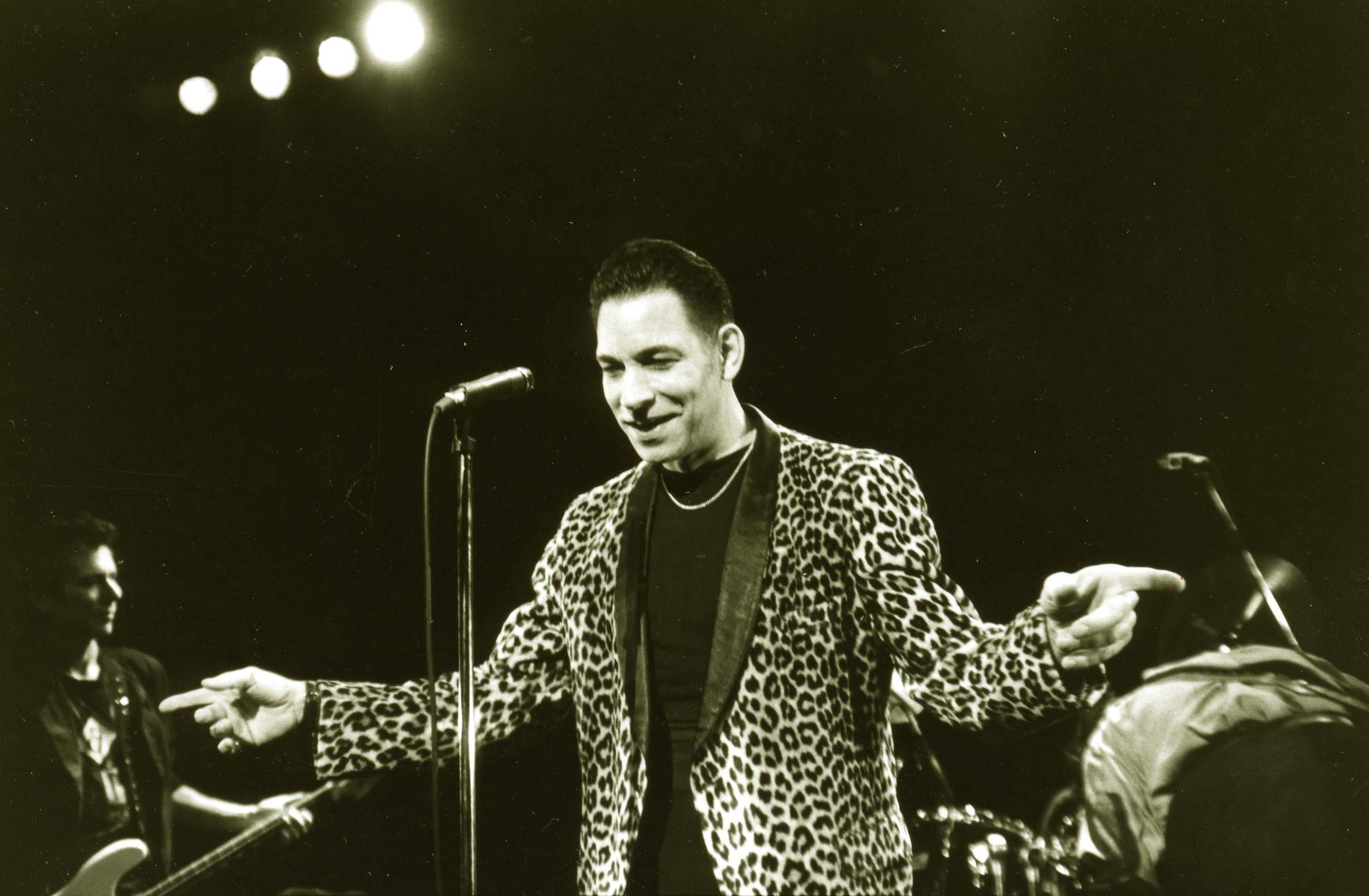
Gordon on tour with Chris Spedding in Japan, 1993

Record producer Richard Gottehrer discovered Gordon during a rehearsal one afternoon with Tuff Darts and soon afterward the two were talking about making a rock and roll record. Gottehrer was impressed with Gordon's voice and his rendition of Elvis Presley's "One Night". After some conversation, Gordon suggested working with guitar legend Link Wray. Wray was contacted and he agreed to work with them both. "Robert to me sounds a lot like the early Elvis, back when he was at Sun Records", he commented. In 1977, Robert Gordon with Link Wray on Private Stock Records was the result of this collaboration. After Elvis Presley's unexpected death in August, 1977, the album picked up some airplay, and the Private Stock label attempted to hype Gordon as the heir to Presley. In 1978, Gordon made a second album with Wray, for Private Stock called Fresh Fish Special. The record featured The Jordanaires, who had been background vocalists for Presley, and included the Bruce Springsteen song "Fire". Springsteen played keyboards on the track.

In 1978, RCA Records signed Gordon to a contract which he described as "a dream come true" to record for "Elvis's label". In February, 1979, the album Rock Billy Boogie was issued on the RCA Victor label, this time without Wray, as Chris Spedding joined Gordon, playing lead guitar. Writer Bruce Eder (AllMusic) hailed Gordon's next album, Bad Boy, released in 1980, as one of the best mature rockabilly albums ever recorded. Gordon's next and final album for RCA was 1981's Are You Gonna Be the One. The title track written by Marc Jonson. It is Gordon's best-selling album to date, with more than 200,000 copies sold. Danny Gatton played lead guitar on this record and Marshall Crenshaw penned the single "Someday, Someway", which went to No. 76 on the Billboard chart in 1981.

During the early 1980s, Gordon toured briefly with Gatton. A recording of one of their performances was later released on NRG Records as "The Humbler".

In the early 1990s Gordon toured with Spedding, including Japan, Norway, Finland, United States, Spain and Sweden, with a number of live tracks later appearing on the 2006 Climate Control album Born To Rock.

=== Reunion ===
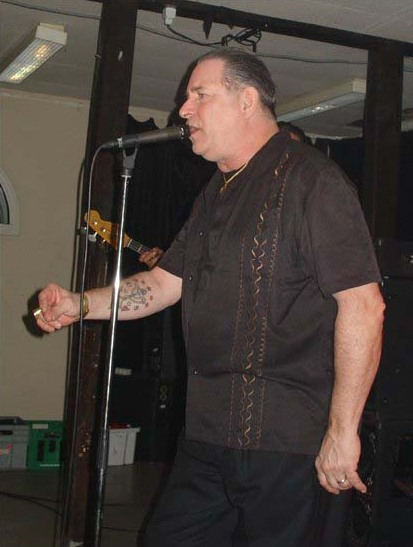
Gordon performing live in Denmark, 2007

In 2005, after years of not working together, Gordon and guitar player Chris Spedding reconnected and toured Europe. Highlights from the shows in Denmark, Sweden and Finland were released on The Reunion Tour, on their own Climate Control label. The French label Last Call released a DVD from the Amsterdam concert, entitled Rockin' the Paradiso. They also recorded an album of 15 Elvis Presley songs with the Jordanaires for the 30th anniversary of Presley's death, entitled It's Now Or Never, released on the Rykodisc label. In 2007 Robert Gordon had a small European tour, backed by Marco DiMaggio and his band. During that tour Robert performed in Moscow, Russia. According to Robert's manager it was one of the very best gigs of that tour. In 2009 and 2010 Gordon toured with an all-star line-up, "The Gang They Couldn't Hang" ("TGTCH"), that included Chris Spedding, Slim Jim Phantom and Glen Matlock. Notable "Gang" dates included the Byron Bay Blues Festival in Australia, and the Azkena Rock Festival in Spain where Gordon and TGTCH performed on a bill with Kiss and Bob Dylan in front of a crowd of 20,000.

=== Later life ===
Gordon continued to release music in his later years. In 2014, He released the album I'm Coming Home. He toured the U.S. and Europe, and on April 19, 2014, he performed at the 17th annual Viva Las Vegas Rockabilly Weekender at The Car Show event in Las Vegas, Nevada.

In 2020 he released Rockabilly for Life, and on November 25, 2022 Hellafied was released posthumously.

== Acting career ==
In 1982, Gordon costarred with Willem Dafoe in future Oscar winner Kathryn Bigelow's first film, a 1950s-styled motor-biking movie (inspired by Marlon Brando's The Wild One) called The Loveless. This was Dafoe's first feature starring role. Critics generally liked the soundtrack but disliked the film. The Loveless did poorly at the box office but is now considered a cult favorite. Gordon also made numerous TV appearances including a 1981 skit on the popular comedy show SCTV in which he performed with his band, including Danny Gatton—after having been "mistakenly" booked on the show as the astronaut Gordon Cooper. The spoof of a space shuttle launch also featured SCTV regulars Dave Thomas as Walter Cronkite and Rick Moranis as David Brinkley.

== Death ==
Gordon died in New York City, on October 18, 2022, at the age of 75, after years of acute myeloid leukemia.

== Discography ==
=== Studio albums ===
- 1977 – Robert Gordon with Link Wray (Private Stock PS-2030)
- 1978 – Fresh Fish Special (with Link Wray) (Private Stock PS-7008) - AUS #96
- 1979 – Rock Billy Boogie (RCA Victor AFL1-3294)
- 1980 – Bad Boy (RCA Victor AFL1-3523)
- 1981 – Are You Gonna Be the One (RCA Victor AFL1-3773)
- 1994 – All for the Love of Rock 'N' Roll (Viceroy VIC-8014)
- 1997 – Robert Gordon (Llist Records LLR-00792)
- 2004 – Satisfied Mind (Jungle Records TCB-2222CD)
- 2007 – It's Now or Never (with Chris Spedding) (Rykodisc RLP-1915-1)
- 2014 – I'm Coming Home (Lanark Records LNR-088)
- 2020 – Rockabilly for Life (Cleopatra Records CLO1760)

=== Live albums ===
- 1979 – Live from the Paradise, Boston, MA 3/22/79 (RCA, radio promo only)
- 1989 – Robert Gordon: Live at Lone Star (New Rose NR-173, France)
- 1996 – "The Humbler" [live] (with Danny Gatton) (NRG Records)
- 1996 – King Biscuit Flower Hour Presents: Robert Gordon (recorded live 3/30/79 in Philadelphia, PA) (RCA/BMG)
- 2005 – Wild Wild Women, Live (with Link Wray; recorded live at the Musikladen, Berlin, 1978) (Warwick/Jungle)
- 2006 – Robert Gordon & Chris Spedding: Rockin' the Paradiso (Last Call Records 3113142, France)

=== Compilations ===
- 1982 – Too Fast to Live, Too Young to Die (RCA Victor AFL1-4380)
- 1989 – Robert Gordon Is Red Hot (Bear Family BCD-15446, Germany)
- 1989 – Black Slacks (Bear Family BCD-15489, Germany)
- 1991 – Greetings from New York City (New Rose NR-279, France)
- 1998 – The Lost Album, Plus... (Bear Family BCD-16251, Germany)
- 2007 – Real Gone Daddy-O Rarin' to Go! (Climate Change Records – 005, Denmark)
- 2022 – Hellafied (with Chris Spedding) (Cleopatra Records CLO2999) (unreleased 1998 recordings)
