= Black Slacks =

Single by Joe Bennett & the Sparkletones
- B-side: "Boppin' Rock Boogie"
- Released: July 1957
- Genre: Rockabilly
- Length: 2:05
- Label: ABC-Paramount 9837
- Songwriters: Joe Bennett, Jimmy Denton

Joe Bennett & the Sparkletones singles chronology
"Black Slacks" (1957)	"Penny Loafers and Bobby Socks" (1957)

"Black Slacks" is a song written by Joe Bennett and Jimmy Denton and performed by Joe Bennett & the Sparkletones. It reached No. 11 on the R&B chart and No. 17 on the Billboard pop chart in 1957.

The single ranked No. 100 on Billboard's Year-End Hot 100 singles of 1957.

The rockabilly band Jackslacks adopted their name from the song "Black Slacks".

== Personnel ==
- Joe Bennett – vocals, guitar
- Wayne Arthur – double bass
- Howard "Sparky" Childress – guitar
- Jimmy "Sticks" Denton – drums

== Other versions ==
- Buchanan & Goodman sampled the song on their 1957 single, "Santa and the Satellite".
- Robert Gordon released a version of the song as a single in 1979.
- Matchbox released a version of the song as a single in the United Kingdom in 1979.
- Simon & Garfunkel released a version of the song as a medley with their song "Hey, Schoolgirl" on their 1997 compilation album, Old Friends.

== In media ==
- The Sparkletones version has been featured in the films, Crazy Mama (1975) and The Rescuers Down Under (1990).
