= The Sparkletones =

American rock and roll/rockabilly group

- Also known as: Joe Bennett & the Sparkletones
- Origin: Spartanburg, South Carolina, United States
- Genres: Rock and roll/rockabilly
- Years active: 1956–1961
- Label: ABC-Paramount
- Past members: Joe Bennett; Wayne Arthur; Howard Childress; Jimmy Denton

The Sparkletones (sometimes credited as Joe Bennett & the Sparkletones) were an American rock and roll/rockabilly group from Spartanburg, South Carolina, United States.

== History ==
The Sparkletones formed in 1956 at Cowpens High School in Spartanburg when the group's members were between the ages of 13 and 16. In January 1957, Bob Cox, a talent scout for CBS, held auditions at the Spartanburg Memorial Auditorium; The Sparkletones took first prize at the event. Convinced they would be a success, Cox quit CBS to manage the group and flew them out to New York City to sign with ABC-Paramount.

At their first recording session they recorded the 12-bar blues "Black Slacks". Paul Anka, who had been recording in the studio earlier that day, added falsetto background on a different song that the group recorded that day, "Boppin' Rock Boogie". Band members Joe Bennett (born Joseph H. Bennett, February 21, 1940 – June 27, 2015) and Jimmy Denton co-wrote "Black Slacks". Released as a single soon after, "Black Slacks" became a local hit and slowly built up national recognition as the group set out on a tour that crisscrossed the U.S. several times over, also performing on The Nat King Cole Show, American Bandstand, and The Ed Sullivan Show. "Black Slacks" remained on the U.S. charts for over four months, peaking at No. 17 on the Billboard Top 100 in late 1957.

The Sparkletones' next single, "Penny Loafers and Bobby Socks", reached No. 42 on the Billboard pop chart early in 1958, staying on the charts for eight weeks, while "Cotton Pickin' Rocker", "We've Had It", "Late Again", "Run Rabbit Run", all failed to chart over the course of the next three years. In 1959, the group's contract with ABC-Paramount expired, and they released three singles on Paris Records, and only the single "Boys Do Cry" had any semblance of success, peaking at No. 105 in 1959. Around this time original guitarist Sparky Childress and drummer Jimmy Denton left and were replaced by Gene Brown and Donnie Seay, respectively. The group broke up in 1960.

Childress played country in the 1960s. A compilation LP was released by MCA Records in 1980, and European bootleg CD reissues were put out in the 1990s. The band members did occasional reunions in South Carolina into the 2000s.

Joe Bennett served in the U.S. Air Force during the Vietnam War. During that time he was exposed to Agent Orange. In his later years he suffered from complications related to Parkinson's disease and Lewy body dementia. Bennett continued in music as a publisher and teacher. He died on June 27, 2015, at age 75.

Howard "Sparky" Childress (born on April 21, 1943, in Spartanburg) died in Chesnee, South Carolina, on November 30, 2019, at age 76.

== Members ==
- Joe Bennett - vocals, lead guitar (d. 2015)
- Wayne Arthur - double bass
- Howard "Sparky" Childress - backup vocals, rhythm guitar (d.2019)
- Jimmy "Sticks" Denton - drums
- William "Bill" Swift - vocals (not on ABC recordings)

== Cultural references ==
Their biggest hit "Black Slacks" can be heard in the Walt Disney cartoon The Rescuers Down Under. When Bernard and Miss Bianca enter Albatross Airlines, the character 'Wilbur' is dancing and singing to the tune on the stereo.

== Discography ==
=== Singles ===
Year	Title	Peak chart positions		Record Label	B-side
Year	Title	US	R&B	Record Label	B-side
1957	"Black Slacks"	17	11	ABC-Paramount; Records	"Boppin' Rock Boogie"
1957	"Penny Loafers and Bobby Socks"	43	—	ABC-Paramount; Records	"Rocket"
1958	"Cotton Pickin' Rocker"	—	—	ABC-Paramount; Records	"I Dig You, Baby"
1958	"Little Turtle"	—	—	ABC-Paramount; Records	"We've Had It"
1958	"Do the Stop"	—	—	ABC-Paramount; Records	"Late Again"
1959	"Bayou Rock"	—	—	Paris Records	"Beautiful One"
1959	"Boys Do Cry"	105	—	Paris Records	"What the Heck"
1960	"Are You from Dixie"	—	—	Paris Records	"Beautiful One"
1965	"Run Rabbit Run"	—	—	ABC-Paramount; Records	"Well Dressed Man"
