= I Don't Want to Grow Up =

Studio album by the Descendents
- Released: May 15, 1985
- Recorded: April 1985
- Studios: Music Lab, Los Angeles
- Genre: Punk rock
- Length: 28:53
- Label: New Alliance
- Producers: Bill Stevenson, David Tarling

Descendents chronology
Milo Goes to College (1982)	I Don't Want to Grow Up (1985)	Bonus Fat (1985)

I Don't Want to Grow Up is the second studio album by the American punk rock band the Descendents, released on May 15, 1985, through New Alliance Records. It marked the end of a two-year hiatus for the band, during which singer Milo Aukerman had attended college and drummer Bill Stevenson had joined Black Flag. I Don't Want to Grow Up was the first of two albums the Descendents recorded with guitarist Ray Cooper, and their last with original bassist Tony Lombardo, who quit the group because he did not want to go on tour. Though recorded quickly and without much rehearsal time, I Don't Want to Grow Up received positive reviews from critics, who praised its catchy songs, strong melodies, and pop-influenced love songs.

== Background ==
The Descendents' first full-length album, Milo Goes to College (1982), had been so named because singer Milo Aukerman was departing the band to attend college; he enrolled at El Camino College for one year, then attended the University of California, San Diego from 1983 to 1985, where he studied biology. In his absence, the band—guitarist Frank Navetta, drummer Bill Stevenson, and bassist Tony Lombardo—recruited Ray Cooper as singer and continued performing locally for a time during 1982 and 1983. Cooper preferred playing guitar to singing, however, and the band would occasionally perform with Aukerman as a quintet during his return visits to Los Angeles.

Stevenson also joined Black Flag in early 1983, intending to be in both bands simultaneously. "I'm the Descendents' drummer", he said at the time. "I'm permanently in both bands. Other than that, I'm a nice person." He spent most of January–May 1983 on the road with Black Flag, touring the United States and Europe. With this experience, he desired to take the Descendents on tour as well: "I got a taste of touring in Black Flag," he later recalled, "and I wanted to take that and spread it laterally to what the Descendents would or could do." However, he encountered resistance from Navetta and Lombardo: "Bill kind of sat down with me and Frank and said something to the effect of we were at a point where we needed to grow by going on the road", Lombardo later said. "Frank said no, and I had to say no also, so he said he had to leave the band and we were both kind of bummed out. I don't think Frank even believed him at first. That was a bad scenario." Stevenson soon found Black Flag's touring and recording schedule too busy to allow time for the Descendents. "I got in over my head", Stevenson later said. "When I joined [Black] Flag I had every intention of doing both bands but it was physically impossible. Flag had all this stuff in progress, so I put Descendents on hold."

With the Descendents effectively on hiatus, Navetta, Lombardo, and Cooper tried to start a new band, the Ascendants, but only played one show. Navetta ultimately quit the band by setting all of his musical equipment on fire and moving to Oregon, where he became a full-time fisherman. Stevenson remained in Black Flag, with whom he recorded five studio albums, a live album, and two EPs,^{[I]} and toured consistently from March through December 1984. According to Aukerman, the idea to record a new Descendents album originated in March 1985 during the recording of Black Flag's Loose Nut album:

Bill was recording with Black Flag and he invited me up to do backing vocals for Loose Nut. He pulled me aside and he's like "Hey, I got these songs, but they're not Black Flag songs, they're really more Descendents songs", and I said "Let me hear them." It was just an instrumental track and he sang over it and sang "Silly Girl" to me and I was like "Wow!" He said "I can't do these in Black Flag." I said "Well, maybe we should do them!"

By April 1985 Stevenson had left Black Flag and he, Aukerman, Lombardo, and Cooper reconvened as the Descendents to record the band's second album.

== Writing ==
In addition to the songs Stevenson had written, the other band members made songwriting contributions to the album. Although Frank Navetta had left the band, one song he had written lyrics for, "Rockstar", was used for the album. Cooper's sole writing credit is on lyrics to the lead track, "Descendents", which are attributed to the entire band. "'Descendents' was written by Ray and I about Bill leaving the band", said Lombardo. The song opens with the lyrics "Just because we've gone away / Here's a message from me and Ray / We're not gonna let the music die / Join us if you've got the energy".

Lombardo contributed the album's title track, which expressed his desire for individuality: "I would write a song like 'I Don't Want to Grow Up' like, 'I don't want to grow up because I don't want to be like certain adults that were negatively influencing the world'", he recalled in 2013, "not just 'I want to be a kid and live like a kid.' I don't want to grow up to be like you."

Aukerman's lyrics to "Pervert" dealt with his conflicting feelings about his libido: "['Pervert'] is about how I like to have sex, but sometimes I like it so much that I think I'm perverted", he said in a mid-1980s interview. "Sometimes I want to have sex so much that I think I'm a pervert, so that's why I wrote the song. Even though sex is the healthiest thing in the world, the most natural thing, sometimes for some strange reason my psyche tells me that I should be a pervert for wanting to have it so much."

== Recording ==
"Silly Girl"
"Silly Girl", written by Stevenson, was one of the songs that convinced Aukerman to rejoin the band. Stevenson felt producer/engineer David Tarling gave the album too much reverberation and other production aspects characteristics of 1980s pop music.

The band learned the new material and recorded the album within a two-week period, leaving little time to rehearse the songs. In addition to the time constraint, they had lost the rehearsal space they had shared with Black Flag, and until the first day of recording were unable to practice with all of their equipment plugged in. As a result, the songs had much more of a pop sound on the album than they did when the band performed them live. "We could've put a lot more practice time into it," said Aukerman during the album's supporting tours, "but I think that the songs themselves are just really good songs. We play them all better now."

I Don't Want to Grow Up was recorded in April 1985 at Music Lab studios in Hollywood with producer and engineer David Tarling, who had worked with Stevenson on the recording and production of Black Flag's Loose Nut (1985), The Process of Weeding Out (1985), and In My Head (1985). "He was really fond of those 1980s production trappings, and the record is polluted and corrupted with them", Stevenson later reflected, complaining that "[It] sounds like all weird, reverby, crazy '80s shit." He also recalled that at one point Tarling passed out, leading Stevenson to take over the recording controls: "[He] was having some kind of problems or something, and he was drinking a lot, and he got so drunk while we were recording that he passed out. So I basically kinda rolled his chair out of the way and rolled my chair in place of it, and then lo and behold, Bill Stevenson is an engineer! And of course that record sounds terrible! I fucked it up good and well, but that's how I started learning. So it was basically a DIY kinda thing."

== Release and touring ==
In 1985, when Bill came to me and said he had lined up a U.S. tour, I had just bought a house, I had been working at the post office for three years, and I was engaged to a woman who I never did marry. Not doing that [tour] was the biggest mistake of my life [...] I will always regret that. It was my insecurities. To go on the road, to leave this woman, my house, my job...I wasn't a 17 year-old kid who could say "Bye, mom, I'm off." It's goodbye to this woman I'm engaged to, goodbye to this house I put $40,000 on, goodbye to this job I've had for three years.

— Tony Lombardo

Like Milo Goes to College, I Don't Want to Grow Up was released as an LP record through New Alliance Records, an independent record label run by D. Boon and Mike Watt of the San Pedro-based punk band the Minutemen, who were contemporaries of the Descendents. Stevenson prepared a tour to support the album, but Lombardo declined due to his personal and professional commitments, thus quitting the band. Stevenson later regretting not being more accommodating:

Grow Up was coming out and it's like "Hey, this is gonna come out and we need to go play shows. We can't just stay here." I probably wasn't thinking about the wholeness of the lineup and the friendships there as much as just thinking about "well, I want the band to do more." I may have inadvertently trampled a few innocent victims in the path [...] Looking back on it, I should have been more sensitive to Tony's time limitations and maybe tried to limit the touring to if he had a week or two off. That would have been the compassionate thing to do as a band of friends, but I think I was too hell-bent on charging it and going for it. The band was just too good to be "Let's practice four days a week and do two shows a month." We were just too good of a band for that to be the end of our story.

Lombardo was replaced in the band's lineup by Doug Carrion, who had attended Mira Costa High School with Aukerman and Stevenson and was playing in a band called Anti. "I get this weird note on my door," recalled Carrion, "and it's like 'Hey, this is Bill. I'm thinking about doing the Descendents again. Tony can't do it, so I want to know if you want to give it a swing.' So we practiced getting me brought up to speed and then, right as school was ready to stop, Milo jumped in the van and we started doing shows." The Descendents undertook three tours of the United States between April 1985 and March 1986 to support I Don't Want to Grow Up. The band's first performance outside of California was June 21, 1985, at CBGB in New York City. Their first tour then began in Phoenix, Arizona on July 18 and took the band east through the Southern United States, north to the Mid-Atlantic states and New England, west through the Midwestern United States, then through Colorado, Utah, and Idaho to Seattle before heading south along the West Coast of the United States, ending September 14 in San Diego; covering 27 states with a total of 43 shows in 42 cities. Carrion later recalled of the experience:

That first tour was probably one of the most difficult tours and the funnest tour at the same time. The hard part was we were traveling in this horrible, horrible, beat-up '71 Ford Econoline van in the dead of summer with no air conditioning. You're laying on this plywood loft and the sun's sweltering on the ceiling. You stay at sketchy houses in sketchy neighborhoods with sketchy people. There's a show on Friday and Saturday, and then you're just wandering the states wondering what to do. "Holy smokes, there's a show in Seattle and we're in El Paso. How many days do we have to get there? Nine. What are we gonna do for nine days?" Funny, crazy, and everybody was kind of dedicated to having about as much fun as could happen in a 24-hour period.

The second tour was more sporadic and localized, with 15 shows in California, Arizona, and Nevada between September 19 and December 15. The Descendents played the 9:30 Club in Washington, D.C., on December 20 before starting their third tour in Phoenix, Arizona the following day. This tour followed a similar route to the first, going through the Southwestern and Southern states before turning north to Pennsylvania; then crossing into Canada for three shows in Ontario, the band's first outside the United States; then through the Midwestern states; ending March 1 in Salt Lake City; covering 20 states and Ontario with a total of 39 shows in 39 cities.

In 1987 New Alliance was sold to SST Records, who re-released I Don't Want to Grow Up on LP, cassette, and compact disc.

== Reception ==
Professional ratings
Review scores
Source	Rating
AllMusic	4/5 stars
Robert Christgau	B+

Ned Raggett of AllMusic said, "When the four want to be straight up and perfectly poppy, they can and do with smashing success, with surprisingly mature, emotional lyrics and playing that doesn't rely on all-speed all the time." Robert Christgau said, "They 'don't even know how to sing', they excoriate themselves as perverts for wanting sex, and when they fall in love they try to write Beatles songs. Chances are you'll find them awkward, but I'm tremendously encouraged that they can fall in love at all. Anyway, their Beatles songs are pretty catchy." In a 2004 biography of the band, Jenny Eliscu of Rolling Stone commented that the album "featured the most singable tunes the band had ever written. 'Good Good Things', 'In Love This Way', and 'Can't Go Back' were positively sunny by Descendents standards; the Beach Boys-gone-punk vibe was an obvious precursor to Weezer. The real advance was their ability to give strong melodies to thrash songs: 'My World' and 'Silly Girl' border on heavy metal but leave out the goofy excess and include way more self-pity."

According to Finn McKenty, the band and the album was a major influence on what would be known as pop punk in the 1990s and 2000s, mainly due to the band's "fairly normal" image and upbeat songs with lyrics about growing up, going to school/college, falling in love, breaking up, rather than something political, aggressive, violent or anti-social—themes that were prevalent in the punk rock and hardcore music at the time.

== Cover versions ==
In the decades since its release, several artists have recorded cover versions of songs from I Don't Want to Grow Up for other releases, including:

- "I Don't Want to Grow Up" by Pkids^{[II]} and by Bobby Birdman^{[III]}
- "Pervert" by the Bouncing Souls^{[II]}
- "Can't Go Back" by Poole^{[II]} and by the Tijuana Panthers^{[III]}
- "Silly Girl" by Bunnygrunt^{[II]}
- "Christmas Vacation" by Soccer^{[II]} and by +44^{[IV]}
- "Good Good Things" by Dunebuggy^{[II]}, Edsel^{[III]}Colleen Green and Drain
- "Ace" by Thrush Hermit^{[II]}

== Track listing ==
Side A
No.	Title	Writer(s)	Length
1.	"Descendents"	Milo Aukerman, Ray Cooper, Bill Stevenson (lyrics); Tony Lombardo (music and lyrics)	1:42
2.	"I Don't Want to Grow Up"	Lombardo	1:19
3.	"Pervert"	Aukerman (lyrics), Lombardo (music)	1:45
4.	"Rockstar"	Frank Navetta (lyrics), Lombardo (music)	0:35
5.	"No FB"	Aukerman	0:33
6.	"Can't Go Back"	Stevenson	1:43
7.	"GCF"	Lombardo	1:57
8.	"My World"	Aukerman	3:27
9.	"Theme"	Lombardo	2:12

Side B
No.	Title	Writer(s)	Length
1.	"Silly Girl"	Stevenson	2:21
2.	"In Love This Way"	Aukerman	2:30
3.	"Christmas Vacation"	Aukerman (lyrics), Stevenson (music)	2:36
4.	"Good Good Things"	Stevenson	2:19
5.	"Ace"	Stevenson	3:54
Total length:			28:53

== Personnel ==
Adapted from the album liner notes.

Band

- Milo Aukerman – vocals
- Ray Cooper – guitars
- Tony Lombardo – bass
- Bill Stevenson – drums

Production

- David Tarling – production, engineering
- Bill Stevenson – production
- John Golden – mastering

== Notes ==
- I My War (1984), Family Man (1984), Slip It In (1984), Live '84 (1984), Loose Nut (1985), The Process of Weeding Out (1985), In My Head (1985), and Minuteflag (1986)
- II On Homage: Lots of Bands Doing Descendents' Songs (1995)
- III On Milo Turns 50: Songs of the Descendents (2013)
- IV On Kevin & Bean's Super Christmas (2006)
