= Danny Gatton =

American guitarist (1945–1994)

- Born: Daniel Wood Gatton Jr. September 4, 1945; Washington, D.C., US
- Died: October 4, 1994 (aged 49) Newburg, Maryland
- Genres: Blues rock, rockabilly, jazz rock, rock & roll, country rock
- Occupation: Musician
- Instruments: Guitar, Banjo, Lap Steel Guitar
- Years active: 1959–1994
- Website: dannygattonguitar.com

Daniel Wood Gatton Jr. (September 4, 1945 – October 4, 1994) was an American virtuoso guitarist who combined blues, rockabilly, jazz, and country to create a musical style he called "redneck jazz", a term which he took from fellow DC-born guitarist Evan Johns, who had composed a song by that name (and who later went on to fame with his band Evan Johns and the H-Bombs).

== Career ==
Daniel Wood Gatton Jr. was born in Washington, D.C., in 1945. The son of a rhythm guitarist, Gatton started playing at the age of nine. From 1960–1964 he played jazz guitar with the Offbeats, then worked as a session musician in Nashville. When he returned to Washington, he drew attention in the 1970s as a member of Liz Meyer & Friends and other local bands. He recorded his debut album, American Music (1975), followed by Redneck Jazz (1978) with pedal steel guitarist Buddy Emmons appearing as a guest. He founded the band the Redneck Jazz Explosion.

Although Gatton could play most genres of music, including jazz, blues, bluegrass, and rock, he was known as a country and rockabilly guitarist. He toured with singers Roger Miller and Robert Gordon. He was sometimes called "The Telemaster" and "the world's greatest unknown guitarist". Guitarist Amos Garrett called him "The Humbler" for his ability to defeat other guitarists in "head-cutting" jam sessions. On this point, however, Gatton declared: “The biggest humbler to me, of all time, would be Lenny Breau. He was the best I have ever seen."

In 1987, nine years after his previous album, he released Unfinished Business, an eclectic collection of pop, rock, and country music that Guitar World magazine named the tenth best album of the 1980s. He got a contract with his first major record label and released another eclectic album, 88 Elmira Street (Elektra, 1991), which contained a cover version of the theme song from the animated TV series The Simpsons.

Gatton turned toward jazz for the albums New York Stories (Blue Note, 1992) and Relentless (1994) with Joey DeFrancesco.

== Death ==
Gatton died by suicide at his farm in Newburg, Maryland on October 4, 1994.

== Reception ==
When Rolling Stone magazine selected the 100 Greatest Guitarists of all Time in 2003, senior editor David Fricke ranked Gatton 63rd on his ballot. On May 26, 2010, Gibson.com ranked Gatton as the 27th best guitarist of all time.

Among his admirers are Buckethead, Joe Bonamassa, Lenny Breau, James Burton, Chris Cheney, Vince Gill, Johnny Hiland, Evan Johns, Bill Kirchen, Albert Lee, Les Paul, Arlen Roth, Paul Bechtoldt, Roy Buchanan, Darren Thiboutot Jr., Richie Sambora, Ricky Skaggs, Slash, Lou Reed, Trey Anastasio, and Steve Vai.

Gatton has been described as possessing an extraordinary proficiency on his instrument, "a living treasury of American musical styles." In 2009, John Previti, who played bass guitar with Danny for eighteen years, stated, "You know, when he played country music, it sounded like all he played was country music. When he played jazz, it sounded like that's all he played, rockabilly, old rock and roll, soul music. You know, he called himself a Whitman sampler of music." Guitarist Steve Vai reckons Danny "comes closer than anyone else to being the best guitar player that ever lived." Guitarist Albert Lee said of Gatton, "Here's a guy who's got it all."

On January 10–12, 1995, Tramps nightclub in New York organized a three-night tribute to Gatton featuring dozens of Gatton's musical admirers, the highlight of which was a twenty-minute performance by Les Paul, James Burton, Arlen Roth, and Albert Lee. Those shows (with all musicians performing for free) raised $25,000 for Gatton's wife and daughter.

Blue Skies Calling (2011), an album by Boy Wells, includes nearly an hour of Gatton and Wells playing in his living room. "Danny called me before he died and asked me to put a vocal tape together for his label at the time. He needed a singer after his singer, Billy Windsor, had passed. He remained a friend, a good one all those years. This lesson was in the late '70s; it's me and Danny in the living room of his house on Holly Lane in Indian Head, Maryland. It's killer stuff."

== Awards and honors ==
- Grammy Award nomination, "Elmira Street Boogie", Best Rock Instrumental Performance, 1991
- Danny Gatton Signature Telecaster

== Discography ==
=== As leader ===
- American Music (Aladdin, 1975)
- Redneck Jazz (NRG, 1978)
- Unfinished Business (NRG, 1987)
- Blazing Telecasters with Tom Principato (Powerhouse, 1990)
- 88 Elmira St. (Elektra, 1991)
- New York Stories with Joshua Redman, Roy Hargrove (Blue Note, 1992)
- Cruisin' Deuces (Elektra, 1993)
- Relentless with Joey DeFrancesco (Exile, 1994)
- Redneck Jazz Explosion (NRG, 1995)
- "The Humbler" with Robert Gordon (NRG, 1996)
- In Concert 9/9/94 (Big Mo, 1996)
- Untouchable (NRG, 1998)
- Portraits (Big Mo, 1998)
- Capitol Attack with Robert Gordon (Renegade, 1999)
- Funhouse (Flying Deuces Music, 2004)
- Showdown at the Hoedown with Evan Johns (Jellyroll, 2005)
- Oh No! More Blazing Telecasters with Tom Principato (Powerhouse, 2005)
- Redneck Jazz Explosion Volume Two (Flying Deuces Music, 2006)
- Live in 1977: The Humbler Stakes His Claim (Powerhouse, 2007)
- “Live at the Holiday Inn 1987” with Funhouse. (Gress Records, 2025)
