= Berkeley Square (club) =

Coordinates: 37.87015°N 122.28582°W

Berkeley Square was a small music club located at 1333 University Avenue in Berkeley, California, operating in the 1970s through 1990s. Many nationally known bands and artists played there, including Tupac, Primus, the Ramones, Red Hot Chili Peppers, deftones, Dread Zeppelin, Lords of the New Church, Phish, Swans, Crash Worship, Green Day, Mod Fun, Translator, Soundgarden, AFI, Papa Roach, Rancid and No Doubt.

The 1943 Oakland phone directory features a full-page ad for "Ed Hogarty's Berkeley Square," at that location, with a "cocktail lounge, restaurant and retail store." A small strip of businesses now operate in the former venue, including Woolly Mammoth Daycare. A tall sign with the Berkeley Square name and address still stands at the site.

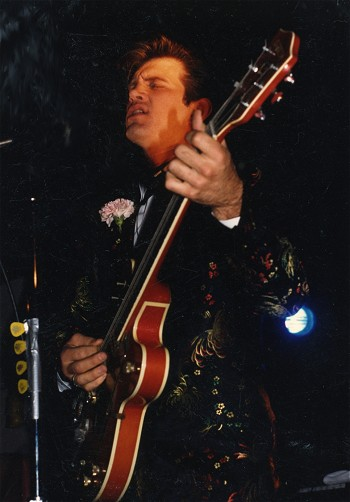
Chris Isaak performing at Berkeley Square, 1986
