= Frank Navetta =

American musician

- Navetta performing with the Descendents in 1982

Background information
- Born: March 6, 1962
- Origin: Manhattan Beach, California
- Died: October 31, 2008 (aged 46)
- Genres: Punk rock
- Occupations: Guitarist, songwriter, fisherman
- Instrument: Guitar
- Years active: 1977–1983, 1996, 2002–2008
- Labels: Orca, New Alliance

Frank Navetta (March 6, 1962 – October 31, 2008) was an American musician who was the original guitarist of the punk rock band the Descendents, which he co-founded. He formed the band in Manhattan Beach, California with Dave Nolte in the late 1970s and played on their 1979 debut single, the Fat EP (1981), and their first album, Milo Goes to College (1982). Navetta then quit the band and moved to Oregon to become a fisherman. He collaborated with the Descendents again on the 1996 album Everything Sucks, and prior to his death in 2008 had been working on new material with original Descendents members Bill Stevenson and Tony Lombardo. In 2021, the band released this material on the album 9th & Walnut, which has been critically lauded for Frank's songwriting and playing.

== Biography ==
=== 1977–83: Descendents ===
Frank Navetta and Dave Nolte met as sixth graders at American Martyrs Catholic School in Manhattan Beach, California. "I was friends with him straight away", Nolte later recalled, "We both had interest in music, we both started playing guitar at the same time." They decided to start a band, and Navetta came up with the name Descendents, an intentional misspelling of "descendants". In mid-1977 they befriended Bill Stevenson, who impressed them by overdubbing his own backing vocals onto a demo tape Navetta had recorded. Stevenson joined the band as drummer, and he and Navetta became good friends; as Stevenson later recalled:

We really hit it off and we would go fishing every day. I was in awe of all these great songs he'd written, and he would play them on the acoustic guitar really hard, Johnny Ramone style, all six strings. He had this bitter resentment that drenched every step he took and every word that he spoke. His songs were just filled with that envy of people that are better looking, that are more successful. It was just really inspiring to be around someone that just hated everything that much. It was just great.

While rehearsing in Navetta's brother's garage in Long Beach, California in 1979, the trio heard Tony Lombardo practicing bass guitar nearby and recruited him into the band. Nolte soon bowed out to join his brothers in The Last, and the power trio lineup of Navetta, Lombardo, and Stevenson released the Descendent's debut single, "Ride the Wild" / "It's a Hectic World" (1979). Navetta wrote and sang on the A-side track. Stevenson's classmate Milo Aukerman joined the band in 1980 as lead singer, solidifying the early Descendents lineup. The Fat EP (1981) included two Navetta compositions, "My Dad Sucks" (co-written with Lombardo) and the fishing-themed "Mr. Bass". The Descendents' debut album Milo Goes to College (1982), so named because Aukerman was leaving the band to study biology, included five more of Navetta's songs: "I Wanna Be a Bear" (co-written with Lombardo), "I'm Not a Loser", "Parents", "Statue of Liberty", and "Marriage" (co-written with Stevenson).

With Aukerman away at college, the Descendents added Ray Cooper as both singer and second guitarist. They performed with this lineup, and occasionally as a quintet when Aukerman would make return visits to Los Angeles. Stevenson pushed for the band to tour, which Navetta and Lombardo were against: "Bill kind of sat down with me and Frank and said something to the effect of we were at a point where we needed to grow by going on the road", Lombardo later said. "Frank said no, and I had to say no also, so he said he had to leave the band and we were both kind of bummed out. I don't think Frank even believed him at first. That was a bad scenario." Navetta, Lombardo, and Cooper tried to start a new band, the Ascendants. "We played one show", said Lombardo. "Frank played in his underwear, and I don't mean boxers. It was all a disaster, it was sad, for me anyway." Navetta ultimately quit the band by setting all of his musical equipment on fire and moving to Oregon, where he became a full-time fisherman.

=== 1984–2008: Post-Descendents ===
Although Navetta had left the Descendents, one song he had written with Lombardo, "Rockstar" (lyrics by Navetta, music by Lombardo), was used for their 1985 album I Don't Want to Grow Up. Lombardo subsequently left the band as well, and the Descendents experienced more lineup changes and released two more albums before Aukerman left the band in 1987. Stevenson changed the band's name to All, and they continued to tour and release albums. When Aukerman reunited with the band as the Descendents for the 1996 album Everything Sucks, Navetta and Lombardo both participated. Navetta wrote and played guitar on the song "Doghouse", and also played on the song "Eunuch Boy".

In 2002 Navetta and Lombardo joined Stevenson for a reunion performance by the Descendents' original power trio lineup at Stevenson's Stockage festival in Fort Collins, Colorado. According to Lombardo, they also recorded some songs for a potential future release: "We recorded some of my songs in 2006 at The Blasting Room. In 2002 we recorded a whole bunch of songs, mostly Frank's songs. He was a great songwriter. He had such a unique EQ out of his amp. When we recorded later in 2008, we did some more of my songs, but Frank wasn't there for that. We tried to recreate that unique Frank sound. I'd like to think of these as songs that if the Descendents had stayed together, this is what we would have sounded like. Those are in Bill's hands. Milo has said from the get-go that he would record it, but he hasn't yet." This project would finally be realized over a decade after Navetta's death in 2021 in the form of the album 9th & Walnut.

=== Death ===
Navetta died October 31, 2008, after becoming ill over the course of a few days. "What I was told by his family", said Stevenson, "was that he died from a diabetic coma and he never came to, he just died in his sleep. But suffice it to say that Frank was in very poor health. Maybe the last ten years of his life, I saw a real decline there [...] Of course, we rekindled our friendship years later in a way that was very ultimate and very real, and it didn't involve the band because he wasn't in the band. He would come out here every year and stay for about a month with me, every year. He did it for years, until he died."

== Personality and playing style ==
I love Frank. He's one of the more original thinkers I've ever met in my life. He was clinically insane. It's hard for me to listen to his guitar playing and not hear the madness at work, and that's why his style is so absolutely impossible to imitate, because it's driven by genuine insanity. He gave us so much in terms of that teeth-gritted "fuck you" attitude, and I thought it was a real important part of what Descendents were and are.

— Karl Alvarez, Descendents/All bassist

During his time with the Descendents, Navetta was known for his aggressive playing and eccentric personality. "I know he had a rough familial thing growing up," recalled Stevenson, "just a lot of familial discord, and I think that can fuel a fire pretty well. I never sat there and went ‘wow, what made this guy so weird?'" "All three of us—Frank, Bill, and I—came from divorced families," said Lombardo, "so that was maybe one of our bonds of commonality."

Mike Watt of the Minutemen remembered that "Frank's image was kinda neat. It was kinda A-frame, with his legs [spread] and his guitar [held] up high. He was kind of a shorter man, but he was a hard-charger. Greg Cameron of SWA recalled seeing Navetta perform:

The second show I ever saw of the Descendents was at the Dancing Waters in San Pedro. They broke into the set and he was playing guitar so hard and so angry that his pants fell down. He was an odd character, for sure. I can remember standing in line at a Misfits show and all of a sudden he just sat down on the ground and started holding his head like his ears were ringing or something, and said something to the effect of "What am I doing here? Where am I?" So that was Frank.

Descendents/All guitarist Stephen Egerton described Navetta as "a complicated guy, for sure, and [he] had a lot of frustration. His songs most certainly bear that out. But he was absurdly generous. He would take his last four bucks and split it with you." Egerton had also said "What struck me about Frank's playing was it reflected very reactionary tendencies -- all downstrokes, all six strings when he could. He didn't really play solos, per se, and there were open chords and minor chords, which was cool in the context of punk. It was a very different kind of a sound, so the rhythmic intent and pulse, what he was going for, cleaner guitar sound... those were the things that struck me overall." All singer Scott Reynolds called him "a very genuine person, crazy in a way that was interesting."

== Discography ==
With the Descendents

- "Ride the Wild" / "It's a Hectic World" (1979) – guitar; lead vocals on "Ride the Wild"
- Fat EP (1981) – guitar
- Chunks compilation (1981) – guitar on "Global Probing"
- Milo Goes to College (1982) – guitar
- Everything Sucks (1996) – guitar on "Doghouse" and "Eunuch Boy"
- The Blasting Room compilation (2000) – guitar on "Like the Way I Know" (outtake from the Milo Goes to College sessions)
- 9th & Walnut (2021) – guitar (posthumous release, recorded in 2002)

== Songs ==
Navetta's writing credits with the Descendents include the songs "Ride the Wild", "Mr. Bass", "Global Probing", "I'm Not a Loser", "Parents", "Statue of Liberty", and "Doghouse". He also co-wrote "My Dad Sucks", "I Wanna Be a Bear", and "Rockstar" with Tony Lombardo, and "Marriage" with Bill Stevenson.
