= Jenny Eliscu =

American radio host

- Born: April 26, 1974 (age 52)
- Occupations: Journalist; radio host; podcaster; producer
- Writing career
- Genres: Music journalism, non-fiction

Jenny Eliscu is an American journalist, radio host, podcaster and producer. She has been an on-air host for SiriusXM since 2007. She was previously a contributing editor for Rolling Stone magazine, penning features and cover stories on artists including Britney Spears, Amy Winehouse, Mariah Carey and My Chemical Romance, among others. She also had a recurring presence on the TV program I'm from Rolling Stone and has been on other music programs, including Behind the Music.

Eliscu has also produced and appeared in music documentaries, including the 2021 Netflix film Britney Vs. Spears and the 2024 Hulu feature Fanatical: The Catfishing of Tegan and Sara. She also hosts and produces a music interview podcast series called LSQ that launched in 2017 and features long-form interviews with musicians, songwriters and producers.

She wrote the liner notes for Britney Spears' greatest hits album Greatest Hits: My Prerogative.
