= Dos (band) =

Rock duo from San Pedro

dos
- Origin: San Pedro, California, U.S.
- Genres: Alternative rock, indie rock, rock
- Years active: 1985–present
- Labels: New Alliance, Kill Rock Stars, Clenchedwrench, Org Music
- Members: Mike Watt; Kira Roessler
- Website: Dos' homepage at Mike Watt's Hoot Page

dos (Spanish, 'two') is an American rock group composed of Mike Watt and Kira Roessler, who both sing and play bass guitar. Critic Greg Prato describes their unusual instrumentation as "a haunting yet intriguing and original sound."

Both performers have substantial experience in pioneering punk groups: Watt has been a member of the Reactionaries, the Minutemen, Firehose, Banyan and the reunited lineup of the Stooges, while Roessler was in Black Flag for about two years.

== Band history ==
Watt and Roessler met not long after Roessler replaced Chuck Dukowski as the bassist of Black Flag in 1983.

The actual origin of dos came about in the fall of 1985 when Watt and Kira, who were already dating, began improvising two-bass jams in their free time, sometimes recording these results into Watt's four-track recording machine.

The sudden death of Minutemen guitarist and lead singer D. Boon in a van accident on December 22, 1985, led to the end of the Minutemen and left Watt deeply depressed. Kira had parted company with Black Flag not long beforehand and moved to New Haven, Connecticut, to work at Yale University. Watt considered abandoning music altogether. But intending to keep him playing after Boon's death, Kira and Watt began collaborating via four-track cassettes sent back and forth in the mail. The activity led to Kira flying back to California to formally work on dos in September 1986.

They recorded their first album, an all-instrumental affair save for Kira's closing track, "Taking Away the Fire", almost immediately, and made their performing debut as dos opening for ex-Black Flag guitarist Greg Ginn's instrumental group Gone that same week. Watt released dos' self-titled first album, dos on New Alliance Records, the label he had formed with D. Boon in 1981. Around the same time, Watt formed Firehose; many of the songs on Firehose's first album Ragin', Full On, are actually dos songs with lyrics added (by either Watt or Kira) and rearranged for a power trio format.

In 1987, Watt and Roessler married, but they divorced seven years later around the time that Firehose broke up.

In 1989, dos recorded a six-song EP, Numero Dos. This release, which featured three vocals by Kira and one by Watt, would be combined with the 1986 LP to become the uno con dos CD almost immediately afterward.

Dos rarely tour extensively, owing to both Watt's other commitments, and to Kira's decision to work full-time, first as a computer programmer and then, currently as a movie sound designer and foley artist. Most dos "tours" have been short, three-to-five-day affairs that would either see Kira flying to meet Watt on the road where they would sometimes open for Firehose, or, less frequently, on their own.

Dos' recorded and live repertoire consists of both original instrumentals (some of which would later have lyrics added to them to become Firehose or Watt solo songs), some original vocal pieces, and cover versions sung primarily by Kira and rearranged for their two basses. Songs by Billie Holiday ("Don't Explain", "Down in the Dumps"), Patsy Cline ("Imagine That", "I Fall to Pieces"), Sonic Youth ("Pacific Coast Highway"), Selena ("No Me Quedo Mas"), and even the Minutemen (a rearranged "Do You Want New Wave or Do You Want the Truth?" from their classic Double Nickels on the Dime album) have found their way into dos' back catalog and live set list.

Watt and Kira's marriage ended amicably in 1994, around the same time Firehose disbanded. The two remained friends and subsequently, chose to continue with dos. They began writing and recording their third album, Justamente Tres, not long afterward; it would be released in 1996 in between Watt's first two solo albums.

In 2003, Watt set up a Pro Tools recording setup in his apartment that he nicknamed Studio Thunderpants, primarily for the purpose of recording his own song demos. Watt and Kira began recording the fourth dos album there at this time, in between Watt's professional commitments as a solo artist and member of Iggy Pop & the Stooges and Banyan, and Kira's day job as a dialogue editor for television and feature films.

In June 2004, dos did their first mini-tour in several years, doing three gigs at jazz festivals in Manitoba and Saskatchewan, Canada, right before Watt had to fly to Europe for a tour with the reunited Stooges.

The fourth Dos album, dos y dos, was recorded at different sessions between 2002 and 2005 at Watt's own home studio, Studio Thunderpants, and later mixed by Yuka Honda. It became the second release on Watt's clenchedwrench label in 2011.

Every December, dos play a benefit show at the Sacred Grounds Coffee House in Watt's hometown of San Pedro, California for Toberman House.

== Discography ==
- 1986: dos (New Alliance)
- 1989: numero dos (12" EP) (New Alliance)
- 1989: uno con dos (CD) (New Alliance)
  - Compact disc compiling the first two dos releases
- 1996: justamente tres (CD) (Kill Rock Stars)
- 2011: dos y dos (Clenchedwrench / Org Music)
