= Big Bottom Pow Wow =

1994 studio album by Firehose

Studio album by Firehose
- Released: 1994
- Genre: Alternative rock
- Label: Columbia
- Producer: Paul Q. Kolderie

Firehose chronology
Mr. Machinery Operator (1993)	Big Bottom Pow Wow (1994)	Red & Black (live) (1995)

Professional ratings
Review scores
Source	Rating
AllMusic	2.5/5 stars

Big Bottom Pow Wow is a promo album by the indie rock/punk rock group Firehose.

The album includes several 'spiels' (conversations) about bass guitarists, the bass guitar and its place in music. These spiels include Mike Watt of Firehose and Minutemen, Cris Kirkwood of Meat Puppets, Flea of Red Hot Chili Peppers and Les Claypool of Primus.

Most of the musical tracks were previously released on Firehose albums and EPs.

== Track listing ==
All music is composed by Firehose (except as noted).

No.	Title	Length
1.	"People, This Is Why (first spiel)"	8:02
2.	"Witness" (originally released on Mr. Machinery Operator)	5:34
3.	"Sperm Count Theory (second spiel)"	7:38
4.	"Revolution (Part Two)" (originally released on Live Totem Pole ep) Butthole Surfers cover)	3:03
5.	"What About Don Quixote? (third spiel)"	9:30
6.	"Down with the Bass" (originally released on Flyin' the Flannel)	2:48
7.	"If You Fail, You Fall Down (fourth spiel"	5:48
8.	"Blaze" (originally released on Mr. Machinery Operator)	3:36
9.	"Enough Spiel? (final spiel)"	5:08
10.	"Formal Introduction" (Live, Unreleased)	3:40
Total length:		54:41
