= LowFLOWs: The Columbia Anthology ('91–'93) =

lowFLOWs: The Columbia Anthology ('91–'93)

Compilation album by Firehose
- Released: April 3, 2012
- Recorded: January 21–30, 1991
- Genre: Alternative rock
- Length: 2:11:43
- Label: Columbia/Legacy

Firehose chronology
Mr. Machinery Operator (1993)	lowFLOWs: The Columbia Anthology ('91–'93) (2012)

lowFLOWs: The Columbia Anthology ('91–'93) is a compilation album by the American alternative rock group Firehose released in 2012 to coincide with the band's reunion gigs of the same year.

The anthology collects all the band's releases on Columbia Records: Flyin' the Flannel, Mr. Machinery Operator, and Live Totem Pole. Also included are a handful of previously unreleased live tracks and instrumental versions. The anthology is the first time material from the long out-of-print Live Totem Pole has been made available.

Bassist Mike Watt said it was the work of the record label and not the band itself.

Yeah, that’s the record company. It’s just the albums we put out with a couple of other tracks. I think there’s a no word version of “Down with the Bass,” a live version of “Powerful Hankerin’ and some song from a movie. There’s nothin’ really that new about it.

== Track listing ==
Disk One

1. Down with the Bass
2. Up Finnegan's Ladder
3. Can't Believe
4. Walking the Cow (Daniel Johnston cover)
5. Flyin' the Flannel
6. Epoxy, For Example
7. O'er the Town of Pedro
8. Too Long
9. The First Cuss
10. Anti-Misogyny Maneuver
11. Toolin'
12. Song for Dave Alvin
13. Tien an Man Dream Again
14. Lost Colors
15. Towin' the Line
16. Losers, Boozers and Heroes
17. Max and Wells (re-done by Mike Watt with Mark Lanegan on Ball-Hog or Tugboat?)
18. Down with the Bass (Instrumental)
19. The Red and the Black (Blue Öyster Cult cover - Live)
20. Sophisticated Bitch (Public Enemy) cover - Live)
21. Revolution, Pt. 2 (Butthole Surfers cover - Live)
22. Slack Motherfucker (Superchunk cover - Live)
23. What Gets Heard (cover - Live)
24. Mannequin (Wire cover - Live)
25. Makin' the Freeway (Live)

Disk Two

1. Formal Introduction
2. Blaze
3. Herded Into Pools
4. Witness
5. Number Seven
6. Powerful Hankerin'
7. Rocket Sled / Fuel Tank
8. Quicksand
9. Disciples Of The 3-Way
10. More Famous Quotes
11. Sincerely
12. Hell-Hole
13. 4.29.92
14. The Cliffs Thrown Down
15. Blaze (Instrumental)
16. Witness (Mersh Again Edit)
17. 4.29.92 (Live)
18. Powerful Hankerin' (Live)
19. Tien An Man Dream Again (Live)
20. Formal Introduction (Live)

== Reception ==
PopMatters gave it seven out of ten stars and called it "a great rock 'n roll story." Spectrum Culture gave it three and a half out of five stars saying "Though lowFLOWs doesn’t quite live up to the expectation of rewriting the history of a beloved if somewhat obscured underground band that went big, it does at least do justice to its source material, giving it a nice but unobtrusive touch-up." Pitchfork gave it 7.9 out of 10 and called it "a pleasure to revisit a group that served so necessary a function for all involved, driven on by heart, their blue-collar work ethic, and stubborn perseverance."
