= Fromohio =

Studio album by Firehose
- Released: 1989
- Recorded: 17–20 October 1988; Suma, Painesville, Ohio
- Genre: Alternative rock
- Length: 31:54
- Label: SST (235)
- Producers: Ed Crawford, Mike Watt

Firehose chronology
| If'n (1987) | Fromohio (1989) | Flyin' the Flannel (1991) |

Professional ratings
Review scores
| Source | Rating |
|---|---|
| AllMusic | 4.5/5 stars |
| The Encyclopedia of Popular Music | 3/5 stars |
| Los Angeles Times | 3.5/4 stars |
| MusicHound Rock: The Essential Album Guide | 3/5 stars |
| The Rolling Stone Album Guide | 3/5 stars |

Fromohio (stylized as fROMOHIO) is the third album by the American alternative rock band Firehose, released in 1989. The album maintained the acoustic and folky sound of If'n.

== Production ==
The album was recorded in singer-guitarist Ed Crawford's home state of Ohio.

== Critical reception ==
The Los Angeles Times wrote that the band "balance their familiar dice 'n' slice, genre-leapin' riffin' with more straightforward song structures." The Chicago Tribune thought that "Crawford's guitar-playing is becoming a more integral part of the band's three-pronged attack. [Mike] Watt's bass and [George] Hurley's drums remain at the core of the band's sound, a dynamic synthesis of punk, funk and free jazz that was pioneered by the Minutemen." The Ottawa Citizen wrote: "Imagine a technically imperfect band that has the art of free-form fusion mastered."

Trouser Press called the album Firehose's "best, most accessible work," writing that Crawford "has absorbed a bit of his bandmates’ eccentricities, and his voice has lost some of its shriller edges." The Rough Guide to Rock thought that, "in the best possible way, it was a very American record, rich in tradition and innovation."

== Track listing ==
1. "Riddle of the Eighties" - 2:00
2. "In My Mind" - 2:16
3. "Whisperin' While Hollerin'" - 2:04
4. "Vastopol" (Elizabeth Cotten) - 1:24
5. "Más Cojones" - 2:02
6. "What Gets Heard" - 2:19
7. "Let the Drummer Have Some" - 0:59
8. "Liberty for Our Friend" - 2:06
9. "Time With You" - 3:13
10. "If’n" - 3:14
11. "Some Things" - 2:43
12. "Understanding" - 3:12
13. "'Nuf That Shit, George" - 0:46
14. "The Softest Hammer" - 3:03

== Personnel ==
- Ed Crawford: Guitar, vocals
- George Hurley: Drums
- Mike Watt: Bass, voices
- Kira Roessler: Guitar, vocals
