= Rise Above: 24 Black Flag Songs to Benefit the West Memphis Three =

Rise Above

Compilation album by Rollins Band
- Released: October 8, 2002
- Recorded: May–June 2002
- Genre: Hardcore punk
- Length: 55:25
- Label: Sanctuary Records
- Producer: Henry Rollins

Rollins Band chronology
A Nicer Shade of Red (2001)	Rise Above (2002)

Professional ratings
Review scores
Source	Rating
AllMusic	4/5 stars

Rise Above: 24 Black Flag Songs to Benefit the West Memphis Three is a 2002 tribute album. It consists of covers of Black Flag songs performed by the Rollins Band, with vocalists from various well-known rock, hip hop, punk and metal artists (as well as certain members of Black Flag) singing. All money raised from sales of the album were donated to the legal funds of the West Memphis Three. It is the final release by the Rollins Band.

== Track listing ==
All tracks are written by Greg Ginn, except where noted

No.	Title	Featured vocalists	Length
1.	"Rise Above"	Chuck D, Henry Rollins	2:11
2.	"Nervous Breakdown"	Keith Morris	1:57
3.	"Fix Me"	Iggy Pop	0:54
4.	"American Waste" (Chuck Dukowski)	Neil Fallon	1:32
5.	"I've Had It"	Cedric Bixler-Zavala	1:22
6.	"I've Heard It Before" (Ginn, Dukowski)	Jeff Moreira	1:37
7.	"Room 13" (Ginn, Medea)	Corey Taylor	1:58
8.	"Wasted" (Ginn, Keith Morris)	Exene Cervenka, Rollins	0:53
9.	"Jealous Again"	Nick Oliveri	1:43
10.	"TV Party"	Rollins	3:33
11.	"No Values"	Hank Williams III	1:35
12.	"Gimme Gimme Gimme"	Dean Ween	1:45
13.	"Depression"	Casey Chaos	2:15
14.	"Six Pack"	Mike Patton	2:15
15.	"Police Story"	Ice-T	1:33
16.	"Revenge"	Tom Araya	0:53
17.	"Thirsty and Miserable" (Robo, Rose Medea, Dez Cadena)	Lemmy	2:12
18.	"What I See" (Dukowski)	Chuck Dukowski	1:55
19.	"No More" (Dukowski)	Tim Armstrong, Lars Frederiksen	2:12
20.	"Black Coffee"	Rollins	4:49
21.	"Slip It In"	Rollins, Inger Lorre	6:37
22.	"Annihilate This Week"	Rollins, Kira Roessler	3:59
23.	"My War" (Dukowski)	Rollins	3:47
24.	"Nervous Breakdown"	Ryan Adams	1:58
Total length:			55:25

== Personnel ==
=== Band ===
- Marcus Blake – bass guitar (tracks 1–23); backing vocals (tracks 1, 10, 14, and 22)
- Jason Mackenroth – drums (tracks 1–23); backing vocals (tracks 1, 10, 14, and 22)
- Jim Wilson – guitar (tracks 1–23); backing vocals (tracks 1, 10, 14, and 22)

=== Vocalists ===
- Ryan Adams – vocals and instrumentation (track 24)
- Tom Araya – vocals (track 16)
- Tim Armstrong – lead vocals (track 19); backing vocals (tracks 1, 10, and 14)
- Cedric Bixler-Zavala – vocals (track 5)
- Exene Cervenka – vocals (track 8)
- Casey Chaos – vocals (track 13)
- Chuck D – intro and backing vocals (track 1)
- Chuck Dukowski – vocals (track 18)
- David "Pappy" Donaldson Sr. – backing vocals (track 10)
- Ice-T – vocals (track 15)
- Neil Fallon – vocals (track 4)
- Lars Frederiksen – lead vocals (track 19); backing vocals (tracks 1, 10, and 14)
- Matt Freeman – backing vocals (tracks 1, 10, and 14)
- Denny Harvey – backing vocals (tracks 1, 10, 14, and 22)
- Josh Homme – backing vocals (tracks 1, 10, 14, and 22)
- Lemmy Kilmister – vocals (track 17)
- Inger Lorre – backing vocals (track 21)
- Brad McDonald – backing vocals (tracks 1, 10, and 14)
- Jeff Moreira – vocals (track 6)
- Keith Morris – vocals (track 2)
- Nick Oliveri – lead vocals (track 9); backing vocals (tracks 1, 10, 14, and 22)
- Mike Patton – lead vocals (track 14)
- Iggy Pop – vocals (track 3)
- Kira Roessler – backing vocals (tracks 1, 10, 14, and 22)
- Henry Rollins – lead vocals (tracks 1, 8, 10, 20, 21, 22, and 23); backing vocals (track 14)
- Corey Taylor – lead vocals (track 7); backing vocals (tracks 1, 10, 14, and 22)
- Tommie Vaughn – backing vocals (track 10)
- Dean Ween – vocals (track 12); outro guitar (track 21)
- Hank Williams III – vocals (track 11)

=== Production ===
- Raina Alomar – layout and design
- Bill Bennett – recording engineer
- Mike Curtis – photos, guitar technician
- Ben Kersten – recording engineer; backing vocals (track 10)
- Stephen Marcussen – mastering
- Heidi May – executive producer
- Clif Norrell – mixing engineer
- Matt Petrich – recording engineer; backing vocals (track 10)
- Bruce Robb – recording engineer
- Dee Robb – recording engineer
- Henry Rollins – producer, photos
