= Get Gone (disambiguation) =

"Get Gone" is a 1999 single by the band Ideal.

Get Gone may also refer to:

- Get Gone (album), 2016 Seratones album
- Get Gone (film), 2019 American film directed by Michael Thomas Daniel
- Get Gone (Note-oriety), 2010 Note-oriety album
- "Get Gone", a song released on the 1993 compilation album Lucky Thirteen (Neil Young album)
- "Get Gone", a song from the 1986 Gone album Let's Get Gone, Real Gone for a Change
- "Get Gone", a song from the 1986 The Choir album Shadow Weaver (The Choir album)
- Get Gone Records, independent record label founded by Sean T
