= If'n =

Studio album by Firehose
- Released: November 4, 1987
- Recorded: September–October 1987; Radio Tokyo, Venice, California
- Genre: Alternative rock
- Label: SST (115)
- Producer: Ethan James, Mike Watt

Firehose chronology
Ragin', Full On (1986)	If'n (1987)	Fromohio (1989)

If'n is the second album by the American alternative rock band fIREHOSE, released in 1987. The name is a reference to the Bob Dylan song "Don't Think Twice, It's All Right" from The Freewheelin' Bob Dylan. The left side of the album cover has a picture of Hüsker Dü, friends of the band and labelmates at SST Records.

"For the Singer of R.E.M." was a tribute to the alternative rock band R.E.M., who had invited Firehose's predecessor Minutemen to join them on the tour to support the 1985 album Fables of the Reconstruction. When Minutemen singer D Boon died in a car crash shortly after the tour, R.E.M. organized a benefit concert for Boon's family and remained friendly with Minutemen Mike Watt and George Hurley, who would go on to form Firehose with singer/guitarist Ed Crawford.

== Reception ==
Professional ratings
Review scores
Source	Rating
AllMusic	4.5/5 stars
Robert Christgau	B

Critical reviews of If'n were mostly positive, describing the album as more focused than Firehose's debut. Robert Christgau said the band "sound more like a regular rock band" on this album. A review in Spin said "If'n realizes the promise of their auspicious debut, Ragin', Full On, and ups the ante, proving once and for all that these dudes live in the shadow of no one."

== Track listing ==
1. "Sometimes"
2. "Hear Me"
3. "Honey, Please"
4. "Backroads"
5. "From One Cums One"
6. "Making the Freeway"
7. "Anger"
8. "For the Singer of R.E.M."
9. "Operation Solitare"
10. "Windmilling"
11. "Me & You, Remembering"
12. "In Memory of Elizabeth Cotten"
13. "Soon"
14. "Thunder Child"

== Personnel ==
- Ed Crawford – vocals, guitar
- George Hurley – drums
- Mike Watt – vocals, bass
