= Toberman =

Toberman is a surname. Notable people with the surname include:

- Charles E. Toberman (1880–1981), American real estate developer and stenographer, nephew of James
- James R. Toberman (1836–1911), American politician

== See also ==
- C.E. Toberman Estate
- Oberman
- Toberman House
