= October Faction =

October Faction may refer to:

- October Faction (band), an off-shot band to Black Flag
- October Faction (album), an eponymous album by the band of the same name
- October Faction, a comic published by IDW Publishing
- October Faction (TV series), a Netflix series based on the IDW comic
