= Getting Even =

Getting Even may refer to:

- Getting Even (album), by Greg Ginn
- Getting Even (1909 film), an American film
- Getting Even (1986 film), an American film
- Getting Even (Bi hesab), a 2017 Iranian film with Getting Even (1986 film)
- "Getting Even" (short story), by Isaac Asimov
- Getting Even (Allen book), a collection of humorous stories by Woody Allen
- Seeking revenge
