= Transcendental Medication =

- Original album artwork by Mark Ryden

Studio album by Inger Lorre
- Released: April 1999
- Recorded: 1996–1999
- Genres: Alternative rock, glam punk
- Length: 45:44
- Label: Triple X
- Producer: Jay Wasco

Inger Lorre chronology
Transcendental Medication (1999)	Live at the Viper Room (2017)

Professional ratings
Review scores
Source	Rating
AllMusic	3/5 stars
Chicago Sun-Times	3/4 stars
The Great Metal Discography	6/10
In Music We Trust	B+
Los Angeles Times	2/4 stars
Melody Maker	2/5 stars
Metal Hammer	6/10
Ox-Fanzine	4/6 stars
San Diego Union-Tribune	3/4 stars

Transcendental Medication is the debut solo album by American musician Inger Lorre, formerly of The Nymphs. The album includes a duet with Jeff Buckley as well as the song "Yard of Blonde Girls" which Buckley covered on his 1998 posthumous album Sketches for My Sweetheart the Drunk. It also includes "She's Not Your Friend", a shot at Courtney Love, with whom Inger had had a spat played out across Hole's Pretty on the Inside album and a Vanity Fair article.

== Track listing ==
All tracks composed by Inger Lorre, except where noted.

1. "She's Not Your Friend" – 4:42
2. "Beautiful Dead" – 2:38
3. "It Could Happen to You" – 3:28
4. "Gibby Haynes Is Next" – 5:45
5. "Haunted Hill" (Lorre, Keith Hartel) – 3:13
6. "Devil's Priest" – 5:43
7. "Yard of Blonde Girls" (Lorre, Audrey Clark, Lori Kramer) – 3:14
8. "Thief Without the Take" – 3:03
9. "Dusted" – 4:55
10. "Sweet Release" – 5:33
11. "7B" – 3:29

== Personnel ==
Personnel per liner notes.

- Inger Lorre – vocals, guitar, piano
- Jeff Buckley – vocals, guitar
- Keith Hartel, Jay Wasco – guitar, background vocals
- Bill Donohue – piano, Hammond B-3 organ, Roland synthesizer, background vocals
- D.Smith – bass, guitar
- Dave Green – bass, background vocals
- Frank Lieberum – drums
- Paul Andrew – drums, percussion
