= Mr. Machinery Operator =

Studio album by Firehose
- Released: February 23, 1993
- Recorded: September 8–20, 1992
- Studio: Capitol Studios, Hollywood, CA
- Label: Columbia
- Producer: J. Mascis

Firehose chronology
Flyin' the Flannel (1991)	Mr. Machinery Operator (1993)	lowFLOWs: The Columbia Anthology ('91–'93) (2012)

Professional ratings
Review scores
Source	Rating
AllMusic	2/5 stars
Rolling Stone	2/5 stars

Mr. Machinery Operator is the fifth and final studio album by the American alternative rock band Firehose. It is also their second album to be released on the major label, Columbia Records.

== Reception ==
Entertainment Weekly gave the album a B− and called it "agreeably sedate." Robert Christgau called the album a dud.

== Track listing ==
1. "Formal Introduction" (Raymond Pettibon/Mike Watt)
2. "Blaze" (Ed Crawford)
3. "Herded into Pools" (Watt)
4. "Witness" (George Hurley/Crawford)
5. "Number Seven" (Kira Roessler)
6. "Powerful Hankerin'" (Pettibon/Watt)
7. "Rocket Sled/Fuel Tank" (Watt)
8. "Quicksand" (Chip and Tony Kinman)
9. "Disciples of the 3-Way" (Watt)
10. "More Famous Quotes" (Watt)
11. "Sincerely" (Roessler/Watt)
12. "Hell-Hole" (Hurley/Crawford)
13. "4. 29. 92" (Watt)
14. "The Cliffs Thrown Down" (Watt)

== Personnel ==
fIREHOSE

- Mike Watt: bass guitar and vocals
- Ed Crawford: guitar, vocals and additional bass
- George Hurley: drums, bongos, percussion

guests

- J. Mascis: additional guitars, bass guitars and vocals
- Joe Baiza, Nels Cline, Mac McCaughan: additional guitars
- Freda Rentie: additional vocals
- David Kahne: Hammond organ
