= Dos y dos =

dos y dos

Studio album by dos
- Released: July 12, 2011
- Genre: Indie, experimental, punk
- Label: Clenchedwrench
- Producer: Yuka Honda

Dos chronology
justamente tres (1996)	dos y dos (2011)

Professional ratings
Review scores
Source	Rating
AllMusic	4/5 stars
PopMatters	6/10 stars
Spectrum Culture	3.1/5.0

dos y dos is an experimental indie album, the fourth by the band dos and the first release in fifteen years by the band. It is a double bass guitar side project for Mike Watt (of the Minutemen and Firehose) and Kira Roessler (from Black Flag). The two were married from 1987–1994.

Watt wanted dos y dos to have less vocals than the previous album, Justamente tres.

== Reception ==
Metro Times called the album "fascinating, experimental and enjoyable" with "an almost spiritual, world music feel to the songs." Folk and Acoustic Music Exchange said "Dos Y Dos has a charming storybook character to it, seemingly accompaniment for a Roald Dahl film that was never made." L.A. Record praised the album and likened it to listening to a "quiet, melodic, throbbing conversation." Spectrum Culture praised the musicianship but said the album was "great for having a think, but it ultimately lacks any major distinction." SLUG magazine appreciated the album saying it was "a whole lot of history filtered through rather sparse instrumentation."

== Track listing ==
1. Number Nine
2. The Winds of May
3. Maker Her Me
4. New Years Waltz
5. Uncle Mike
6. Ties to Bind
7. Number Eight
8. Only You will Know
9. No Me Queda Más (originally recorded by Selena)
10. Frantic
11. Song for Poe
12. It Turned Cold
13. Om Om Om
