= Dos (Dos album) =

dos

Studio album by dos
- Released: 1986
- Recorded: Radio Tokyo Studio, Venice, CA
- Genres: Indie, experimental, punk
- Length: 42:10
- Label: New Alliance Records (NAR032)
- Producers: Mike Watt, Kira Roessler

Dos chronology
dos (1986)	numero dos (1989)

dos is the debut album recorded by the band dos. It is a double bass guitar side project for Mike Watt (of the Minutemen and Firehose) and his then-girlfriend (later wife), Kira Roessler (from Black Flag). Formed as a vehicle to take the bass beyond its perceived background role and into the forefront of a band, Dos also became a therapeutic experience in the wake of Roessler's departure from Black Flag and the sudden death of Minutemen's D. Boon's on December 22, 1985. After exchanging demos for the better part of 1986 (Roessler had moved to Connecticut), the duo reconvened to record their self-titled debut late in the year, subsequently releasing it on Watt's own New Alliance Records.

Some of the tracks, including "The Rabbit and the Porcupine" and "Slow Little Turtle", began life as bedtime stories for Roessler's nephew.

== Track listing ==
1. "The Rabbit and the Porcupine"
2. "Number Four"
3. "Snapshot"
4. "Number Two"
5. "Slow Little Turtle"
6. "Number Three"
7. "Forever"
8. "The Fisherman and His Wife"
9. "Fink One"
10. "Number One"
11. "Taking Away the Fire"
