= October Faction (album) =

1985 live album by October Faction

Live album by October Faction
- Released: 1985
- Recorded: August 26, 1984
- Genre: Punk rock
- Length: 31:00
- Label: SST (036)
- Producer: October Faction

October Faction chronology
October Faction (1985)	The Second Factionalization (1986)

Professional ratings
Review scores
Source	Rating
Allmusic	2.5/5 stars

October Faction is an album by October Faction, the improvisational all-star punk rock band featuring Black Flag members Greg Ginn and Chuck Dukowski and Saccharine Trust guitarist Joe Baiza.

The album was recorded live in one take during a live performance at The Stone, a nightclub in San Francisco where Black Flag would regularly do their "Frisco weekend", the band's term for a monthly residency the band would do at the club when they were not touring. Black Flag's Live '84 was recorded on the same night as this album.

It is presumed that the performance took place on an evening when Black Flag were doing one of their "Frisco weekends", since then-Black Flag drummer Bill Stevenson is credited as the drummer on the album's back cover (even though Greg Cameron, who is depicted on the front cover of Joe Baiza's artwork, had played other shows with October Faction and would play on the band's second album); in the course of the performance, Tom Troccoli introduces Stevenson as substituting for "The Nazi Sex Doctor" (a band nickname for Cameron). Henry Rollins, then Black Flag's lead singer, plays percussion (i.e. he would stand behind Stevenson's drum kit and bang on the floor toms and cymbals, as he is seen doing on Live '84's "I Won't Stick Anyone...").

Three other members of Black Flag and SST Records' extended family are also credited as participants on the album. Sometime roadie/musician Tom Troccoli (who played with Black Flag roadie and SST Records partner Steve "Mugger" Corbin in The Nig-Heist, and in his own band Tom Troccoli's Dog with Ginn on bass) contributed vocals and unintentionally off-key harmonica (he accidentally used a harmonica in a key that clashed with what the rest of the band was playing). Black Flag's soundman, Dave Claassen, who is credited as "Mixing Board Meister", also mixed down the album and contributed artwork of his own to the album's back cover. Mugger, himself, received a credit of "live engineer" under his given name.

As part of Tom Trocolli's Dog, Trocolli and Ginn would later record a more organized version of "Todo Para Mi" for that band's sole, eponymous LP.

== Track listing ==
On the compact disc edition of the album, the performance is presented as one single extended track, even though individual index numbers for every song are erroneously given on the CD label.

1. "It Don't Mean Shit" (October Faction/Tom Troccoli)
2. "Todo Para Mi" (October Faction/Chuck Dukowski/Tom Troccoli)
3. "You, Me" (October Faction/Chuck Dukowski)
4. "Trail of Tears" (October Faction/Chuck Dukowski)
5. "Ten Hour Drive" (October Faction/Tom Troccoli)
6. "Gimme a Quarter, Twenty-five Cents for the Bus" (October Faction/Joe Baiza)
7. "Bad Acid" (October Faction/Chuck Dukowski/Tom Troccoli)

Note

- The songwriting credits are presumed to reflect that the entire band was credited with composing the music, while the individual names are those of whoever was improvising lyrics at the time.

== Personnel ==
- Greg Ginn – guitar
- Joe Baiza – guitar, vocals
- Chuck Dukowski – bass, vocals
- Tom Troccoli – blues harp, vocals
- Bill Stevenson – drums
- Henry Rollins – percussion
