= Eddie from Ohio =

American folk band

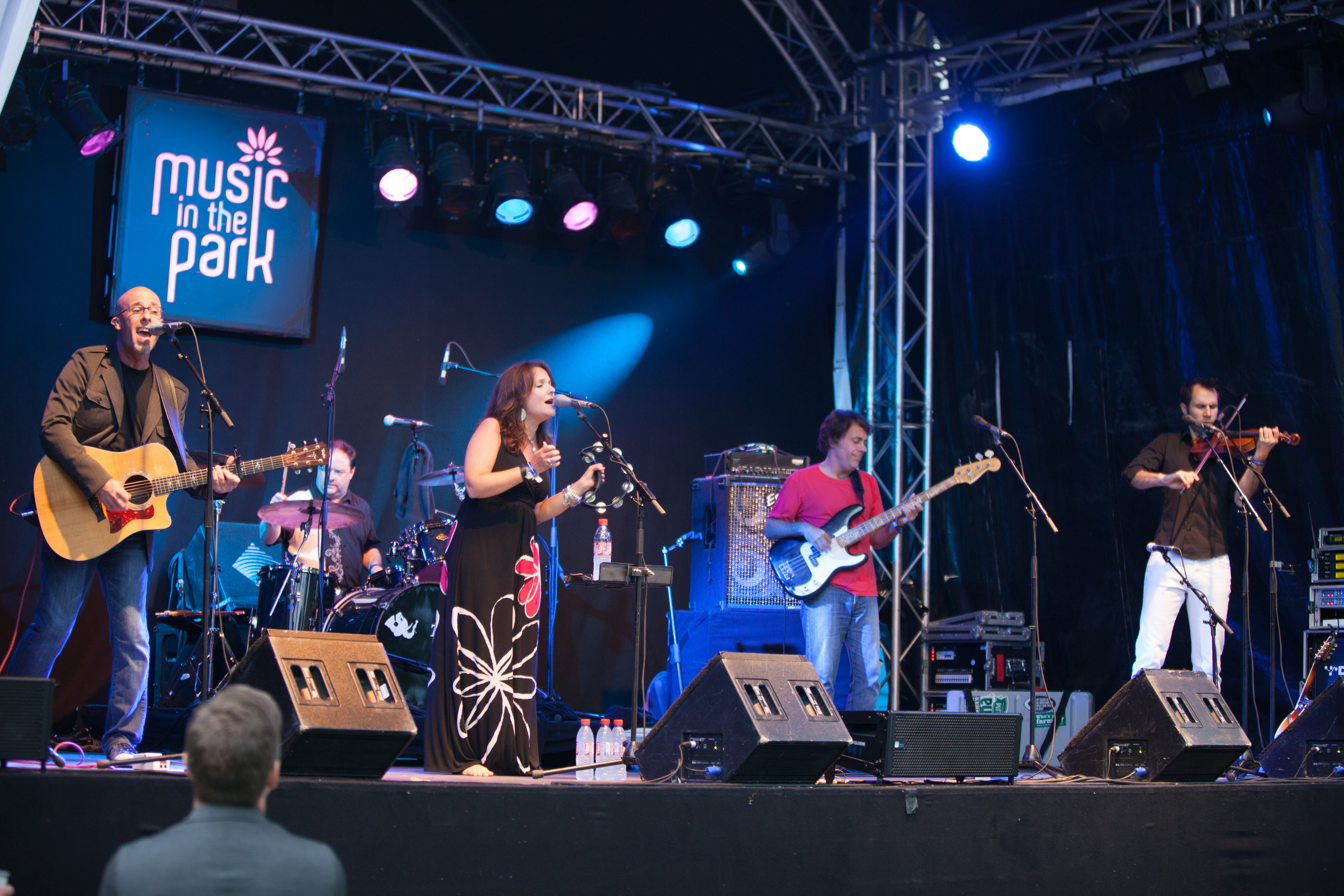
- Eddie from Ohio performing at the Montreux Jazz Festival

Background information
- Origin: Virginia, United States
- Genres: Folk
- Years active: 1991–present
- Members: Julie Murphy Wells; Robbie Schaefer; Eddie Hartness; Michael Clem
- Website: http://eddiefromohio.com

Eddie from Ohio is an American folk band formed in 1991 in Northern Virginia.

== History ==
Contrary to the name, all four band members are natives of Virginia. Childhood friends Robbie Schaefer and Michael Clem both attended Virginia's James Madison University, where they founded the Jellyfish Blues Band and met Eddie Hartness, a native of Arlington. Schaefer had stayed in contact with Julie Murphy (now Murphy Wells), whom he met while they attended rival high schools. Clem and Wells sang with Schaefer during a solo gig and, inspired to start a band, invited percussionist Hartness to join them in 1991. The band's name comes from a nickname given to Hartness by a college friend, who coined the nickname as a tribute to the lead singer of Firehose, Ed 'From Ohio' Crawford.

The band started by covering artists such as The Byrds and Blues Traveler before performing originals by songwriters Schaefer and Clem. They launched their own Virginia Soul record label, began producing cassettes and CDs, and handled their own business and bookings. The band later earned a Tuesday night residency at a local Northern Virginia bar, the Bad Habits Grille.

EFO's first three CDs drew the attention of booking agency Fleming and Associates, embarking on longer, more complex tours.

In 1998, the Washington Area Music Association honored EFO with a Wammie as "Best Contemporary Folk Group." Later that year, EFO played their farewell gig at Bad Habits and began regularly touring beyond the Washington, DC, metro area, from Berkeley, California, to New York City.

In September 2005, vocalist Wells was diagnosed with breast cancer. The band subsequently reduced their tour schedule, and the members began to pursue other interests. Wells survived and became active in cancer cure fundraising. Clem and Schaefer continued to sing and tour independently. Schaefer ran a children's music show, "Robbie Schaefer's Stuck In a Real Tall Tree," on XM Satellite Radio, where he served as music director for XM Kids, and in 2004 released his second solo album entitled "In the Flesh." In 2024, he was ordained as a rabbi. In 2006, Clem released his first solo endeavor, "1st and 40," produced by bandmate Hartness. Hartness continued to play in local bands such as Brother Shamus.

The band stopped performing after 31 years following a 2022 Alaskan cruise, though the previous Jellyfish Blues Band performs intermittently

== Members ==
- Julie Murphy Wells - vocals
- Robbie Schaefer - guitar, vocals
- Eddie Hartness - percussion, vocals
- Michael Clem - guitar, bass, harmonica, vocals

== Discography ==
All releases are on the band's own label, Virginia Soul Records.

- EFO Live at the Birchmere (cassette only), 1991
- A Juggler on His Blades, 1992
- Actually Not, 1993
- I Rode Fido Home, 1995
- Big Noise, 1997
- Portable EFO Show, 1998
- Looking Out the Fishbowl, 1999
- Quick, 2001
- 9 Eleven Relief, 2001
- Three Rooms, 2003
- This Is Me, 2004
