= Inger Lorre =

American alternative rock singer (1963–2024)

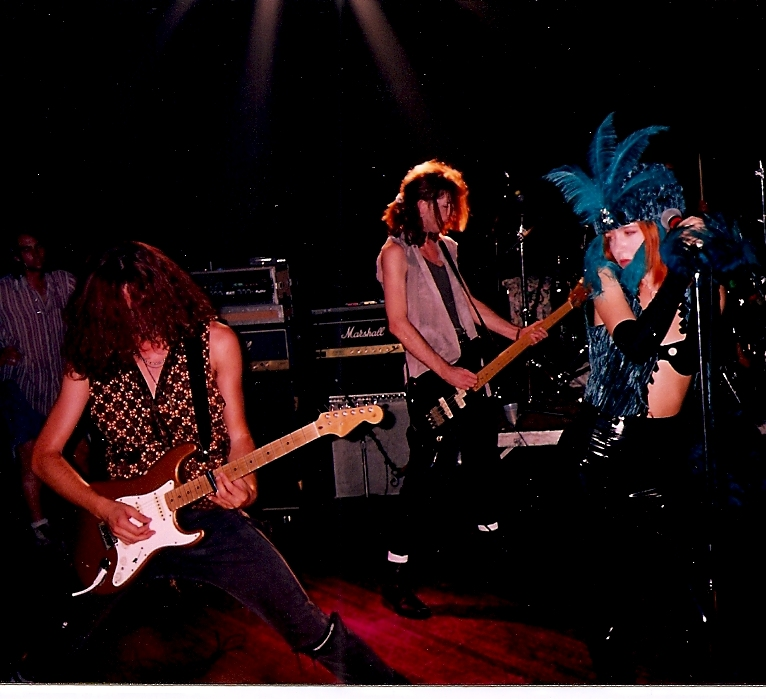
- Lorre (right) performing in 1990

Background information
- Also known as: Inger Lorre-Wening
- Born: Lori Ann Wening; August 2, 1963
- Origin: Matawan, New Jersey, U.S.
- Died: October 16, 2024 (aged 61)
- Genres: Alternative rock; glam punk
- Occupations: Musician; songwriter; singer
- Instrument: Vocals
- Years active: 1984–1992; 1994–2024
- Labels: DGC; Sympathy for the Record Industry; Triple X; Cargo; Sweet Nothing; Kitten Robot
- Formerly of: Nymphs; Motel Shootout; Inger Lorre & the Chiefs of Infinity
- Website: Inger Lorre on Myspace

Inger Lorre (born Lori Ann Wening; August 2, 1963 – October 16, 2024) was an American musician, singer, and songwriter who was best known for her band Nymphs.

== Music career ==
=== Nymphs ===
Nymphs spent the mid-to-late 1980s honing their craft in New Jersey, but they soon decided to try to make it big in California. They hadn't been there more than a few months before only Inger and guitarist Geoff Siegel were left. They replaced the other two with guitarist Sam Merrick, drummer Alex Kirst, and bassist Cliff D. (Cliff Jones).

The band's distinctive sound (a mixture of punk rock and goth, glam and grunge) and image began to attract the attention of major record labels. At the time, the band simply wanted to sign to an indie label, as most grunge and punk bands did before the 1991 success of Nirvana's Nevermind, but by 1989 Nymphs were signed to Geffen Records with a nearly million-dollar recording contract. The band made a brief promotional appearance in the film Bad Influence performing "The Highway", a song Lorre wrote about a young girl infatuated with serial killer Richard Ramirez.

It was at about this time that Nymphs began to have problems with their label. Almost two years had passed since Nymphs had completed their album. Lorre was losing her battle with heroin and in an alcohol induced fit she urinated on the desk of A&R man Tom Zutaut. "Rolling Stone quipped, 'Talk about being pissed at your record label.'" The band fired Lorre when she refused to go on stage in Miami opening for Peter Murphy. An EP called The Practical Guide to Astral Projection was released the same year but it failed to chart.

=== Solo work ===
Lorre returned to New Jersey for several years. A few spots here and there over time, where Lorre popped up in various places, never evolved into a Nymphs reunion or second album. In 1995, she teamed up with Motel Shootout and released the single Burn, on old friend Long Gone John's label, Sympathy for the Record Industry. She entered rehab and worked toward permanent recovery.

She befriended singer Jeff Buckley, and they began collaborating on music. Lorre's vocals are featured on "Angel Mine" while Jeff played guitar, sitar, and mouth sax on the track, released on the Jack Kerouac tribute album Kicks Joy Darkness. Jeff and Lorre duetted again on the track "Thief Without The Take" contained on Lorre's album Transcendental Medication. Buckley also covered "Yard of Blonde Girls" co-written by Lorre, which appeared on Sketches for My Sweetheart the Drunk. Sadly, at the height of his popularity, Buckley drowned during an evening swim on May 29, 1997, before the album's release. Lorre reemerged from New Jersey with her solo album, Transcendental Medication released on Triple X Records in 1999.

In 2000, Lorre moved back to Los Angeles, where she painted and appeared in group shows around the city. She made a cameo appearance in the 2001 indie film Down and Out with the Dolls, a raunchy, wry, and in-your-face tale of the fast rise and fall of an all-girl, four-piece Portland rock band. She performed a cover of Black Flag's "Slip It In" with Henry Rollins on the 2002 album Rise Above.

On July 17, 2004, Lorre played an acoustic show at Hollywood's The Knitting Factory, performing Nymphs songs, new songs and covers. In 2006, a version of The Nymphs popped up in a few places. There were plans to have a reunion with all original members, but with the death of original drummer Alex Kirst, it was no longer possible.

On April 3, 2016, Lorre announced in a Facebook post that she would be performing a show on May 27, 2016, at The Viper Room, "doing 99% Nymphs songs." This resulted in her Live at The Viper Room album.

Lorre's second solo album, produced by Paul Roessler and entitled Gloryland, was released on October 6, 2023, on Kitten Robot Records.

== Illness and death ==
In 2024, Lorre was diagnosed with cancer. She died from the disease on October 16, 2024, at the age of 61.

== Discography ==
=== Nymphs ===
- Nymphs LP − 1991 Geffen
- A Practical Guide to Astral Projection EP − 1992 Geffen

=== Inger Lorre & the Motel Shootout ===
- Burn Single − 1994 Sympathy for the Record Industry

=== Solo ===
- Transcendental Medication LP − 1999 Triple X
- Live at The Viper Room LP − 2017 Sweet Nothing Records
- Gloryland LP − 2023 Kitten Robot Records

=== Guest appearances ===
- Jeff Buckley, Sketches for My Sweetheart the Drunk − 1998
- Rise Above: 24 Black Flag Songs to Benefit the West Memphis Three − 2002

=== Inger Lorre and the Chiefs of Infinity ===
- 7" Single − Side A: Snowflake / Side B: Hate in my Heart 2014 Cargo Records

== Filmography ==
- Bad Influence (1990)
- Down and Out with the Dolls (2001)
