= Loose Nut =

Studio album by Black Flag
- Released: 1985
- Recorded: March 1985
- Studio: Total Access, Redondo Beach, California
- Genre: Hardcore punk, heavy metal
- Length: 34:07
- Label: SST (035)
- Producer: Bill Stevenson, Greg Ginn, David Tarling

Black Flag chronology
| Live '84 (1984) | Loose Nut (1985) | The Process of Weeding Out (1985) |

Loose Nut is the fifth studio album by American band Black Flag, released in 1985 on SST Records.

== Reception ==
Professional ratings
Review scores
| Source | Rating |
|---|---|
| AllMusic | 3/5 stars |
| The Encyclopedia of Popular Music | 2/5 stars |
| The Great Rock Discography | 5/10 |
| MusicHound Rock | 3/5 stars |
| Punknews.org | 5 stars |
| (The New) Rolling Stone Album Guide | 2/5 stars |

Spin wrote, "Henry Rollins' manic ravings make mascaraed posturers seem pale. This band goes off, takes a lot of chances, and when you hear this, you have a lot of fun. Who knows when radio programmers will catch up to them? Black Flag really deserves to be, like, bigger than Thriller."

== Track listing ==
Side A
| No. | Title | Writer(s) | Length |
|---|---|---|---|
| 1. | "Loose Nut" | Greg Ginn | 4:35 |
| 2. | "Bastard in Love" | Ginn | 3:20 |
| 3. | "Annihilate This Week" | Ginn | 4:44 |
| 4. | "Best One Yet" | Kira Roessler, Henry Rollins | 2:37 |
| 5. | "Modern Man" | Ed Danky, Chuck Dukowski | 3:11 |

Side B
| No. | Title | Writer(s) | Length |
|---|---|---|---|
| 6. | "This Is Good" | Ginn, Rollins | 3:34 |
| 7. | "I'm the One" | Roessler, Rollins | 3:15 |
| 8. | "Sinking" | Ginn, Rollins | 4:36 |
| 9. | "Now She's Black" | Bill Stevenson | 4:51 |

== Personnel ==
Black Flag

- Henry Rollins – vocals
- Greg Ginn – guitars
- Kira Roessler – bass, backing vocals
- Bill Stevenson – drums, backing vocals

Additional performers

- Milo Aukerman – backing vocals
- Dez Cadena – backing vocals
- Louie – backing vocals
- Dave Tarling – backing vocals
- The Adams Family – backing vocals

Production

- Dave Tarling – production, engineering
- Greg Ginn – production
- Bill Stevenson – production
- Raymond Pettibon – artwork
- Chuck Dukowski – co–writing on "Modern Man"
