= Ragin', Full-On =

Studio album by fIREHOSE
- Released: 1986
- Genre: Alternative rock, art punk, funk rock
- Length: 33:04
- Label: SST (079)
- Producer: Ethan James

FIREHOSE chronology
Ragin', Full-On (1986)	If'n (1987)

Professional ratings
Review scores
Source	Rating
AllMusic	3/5 stars
Robert Christgau	C+
The Encyclopedia of Popular Music	3/5 stars
MusicHound Rock: The Essential Album Guide	3/5 stars
The Rolling Stone Album Guide	3/5 stars

Ragin', Full-On is the first album by American alternative rock band fIREHOSE. It was released after the breakup of the influential punk rock band Minutemen due to the death of the guitarist D. Boon. Like all fIREHOSE albums, Ragin', Full-On is dedicated to Boon.

== Production ==
The band members wrote the songs in various songwriting combinations, some of which included Kira Roessler.

== Critical reception ==
Robert Christgau wrote that "this sound pretty good insofar as it postpunks like the old band and pretty bad insofar as it makes room for Crawford, a moderately hot guitarist whose vocal instincts are as sappy as his lyrics." Trouser Press noted that "first note to last, there’s a prickly, intangible integrity to the band that the restless Boon would have admired." The Rolling Stone Album Guide thought that the album "overcomes its generally spotty writing with impassioned playing."

== Track listing ==
Adapted from LP labels.

Side Ed
No.	Title	Writer(s)	Length
1.	"Brave Captain"	Ed Crawford, Mike Watt	3:11
2.	"Under the Influence of Meat Puppets"	Kira Roessler, Watt	1:56
3.	"It Matters"	Roessler, Watt	1:36
4.	"Chemical Wire"	Watt	2:40
5.	"Another Theory Shot to Shit"	Watt	2:30
6.	"On Your Knees"	Crawford, George Hurley	2:16
7.	"Locked In"	Roessler, Watt	2:56

Side More Ed
No.	Title	Writer(s)	Length
1.	"The Candle and the Flame"	Crawford, Watt	3:11
2.	"Choose Any Memory"	Crawford	2:02
3.	"Perfect Pairs"	Crawford, Roessler, Watt	2:21
4.	"This..."	Crawford	1:40
5.	"Caroms"	Crawford, Hurley	2:02
6.	"Relatin' Dudes to Jazz"	Roessler, Watt	1:35
7.	"Things Could Turn Around"	Roessler, Watt	3:08
Total length:			33:04

== Personnel ==
- Ed Crawford - guitar, vocals, photography
- Mike Watt - bass guitar, vocals, co-producer
- George Hurley - drums
- Ethan James - producer
