= A Practical Guide to Astral Projection =

EP by Nymphs
- Released: June 29, 1992
- Recorded: 1988–1991
- Genre: Alternative rock, punk rock
- Length: 22:06
- Label: DGC
- Producer: Bill Price

Nymphs chronology
Nymphs (1991)	A Practical Guide to Astral Projection (1992)

Professional ratings
Review scores
Source	Rating
AllMusic	2.5/5 stars
The Encyclopedia of Popular Music	3/5 stars
The Great Metal Discography	5/10
Kerrang!	4/5 stars

A Practical Guide to Astral Projection is the only extended play (EP) by American rock band Nymphs. It was produced by Bill Price and released in 1992 on DGC Records. The EP consists of demos of "The Highway" and "Alright" the band made prior to being signed, a previously unreleased cover of Badfinger's "Come and Get It" plus the album versions of "Imitating Angels" and "Wasting My Days". The EP was released after the band broke up.

== Track listing ==
All songs by Nymphs except for "Come and Get It", written by Paul McCartney

1. "Imitating Angels" – 4:28
2. "Alright" – 4:30
3. "Come and Get It" (Badfinger cover) – 3:57
4. "Wasting My Days" – 4:04
5. "The Highway" – 5:08

== Personnel ==
The Nymphs

- Inger Lorre – vocals
- Geoff Siegel – guitar
- Alex Kirst – drums
- Sam Merrick – guitar
- Cliff D. – bass

Additional personnel

- Bill Price – mixing, producer
- Earle Mankey – engineer
