= Gone II – But Never Too Gone! =

Gone II - But Never Too Gone!

Studio album by Gone
- Released: November 1986
- Recorded: April 1986
- Studios: Total Access Recording Studios, Redondo Beach, California
- Genres: Hardcore punk, heavy metal, jazz punk, jazz fusion, funk rock
- Length: 38:48
- Label: SST (086)
- Producer: Greg Ginn

Gone chronology
Let's Get Gone, Real Gone For A Change (1986)	Gone II - But Never Too Gone! (1986)	Chriminal Mind (1994)

Gone II – But Never Too Gone! is the second album by the instrumental band Gone. During that period, the SST Record label owner Greg Ginn was facing some serious debts and other problems; such as fans not being interested in non-punk bands that he was signing.

== Track listing ==
All tracks composed by Gone

No.	Title	Length
1.	"Jungle Law"	2:22
2.	"New Vengeance"	4:27
3.	"Unglued"	2:26
4.	"Turned Over Stone"	3:52
5.	"Drop the Hat"	0:46
6.	"Adams"	4:33
7.	"Time of Entry"	0:40
8.	"Left Holding Bag"	1:04
9.	"GTV"	3:34
10.	"Daisy Strut"	2:25
11.	"Cutoff"	0:54
12.	"Put It There"	2:01
13.	"Utility Hole"	1:59
14.	"Yesterday Is Teacher"	0:49
15.	"How Soon They Forget"	1:56
16.	"Cobra XVIII"	5:00
Total length:		38:48

== Personnel ==
Gone

- Greg Ginn - guitar, cover artwork
- Andrew Weiss - bass
- Sim Cain - drums
