= Criminal Mind (album) =

Studio album by Gone
- Released: January 31, 1994
- Studios: Casa Destroy Recording Studio, Long Beach, California
- Genres: Heavy metal, hard rock, jazz punk, jazz fusion
- Length: 44:50
- Label: SST (300)
- Producer: Gone

Gone chronology
Gone II - But Never Too Gone! (1986)	Criminal Mind (1994)	All The Dirt That's Fit to Print (1994)

Criminal Mind is Gone's third album after an 8-year hiatus, with original member Greg Ginn and new bassist Steve Sharp and drummer Gregory Moore. Unlike the first two albums the music is more tight and precise.

The album received a rating of four stars from AllMusic, which noted, "At its best, this is intelligent headbanging music that can turn a late night dancefloor into a writhing frenzy, but that also rewards repeated listens with the headphones on and the volume turned way up."

== Track listing ==
No.	Title	Length
1.	"Poor Losers"	2:11
2.	"Punch Drunk"	2:04
3.	"Pull It Out"	2:12
4.	"Pump Room"	3:37
5.	"Snagglepuss"	2:55
6.	"P.S Was Wrong"	3:01
7.	"Off the Chains"	3:46
8.	"Smoking Gun in Wasco"	2:36
9.	"Spankin' Plank"	2:11
10.	"Piled One Higher"	1:48
11.	"Row Nine"	2:04
12.	"Toggle"	2:24
13.	"Big Deck"	2:03
14.	"Ankle Strap"	2:00
15.	"Hand-Cut"	2:21
16.	"Freeny"	4:45
17.	"Unknown Caliber"	2:52
Total length:		46:25

== Personnel ==
Gone

- Greg Ginn - guitar
- Steve Sharp - bass
- Gregory Moore - drums

Technical

- Andy Batwinas - engineer
- Steven Murashige - art direction, illustration
