= Family Man (Black Flag album) =

Studio album / live album by Black Flag
- Released: September 1984
- Recorded: December 1983; June 1984
- Genre: Spoken word; punk rock; free jazz; avant-garde jazz
- Length: 33:26
- Label: SST (026)
- Producer: Greg Ginn; Bill Stevenson; Harvey Kubernik; Henry Rollins; Spot

Black Flag chronology
My War (1984)	Family Man (1984)	Slip It In (1984)

Family Man is the third album by the American hardcore punk band Black Flag. Released in 1984 through SST Records, it features spoken word tracks by vocalist Henry Rollins and jazz-indebted instrumental tracks. It is also the first album to feature bassist Kira Roessler. "Armageddon Man" is the only track on the album in which Rollins and the instruments are together.

The album, along with spoken word recordings by Jello Biafra following the break-up of Dead Kennedys, is credited for introducing "alternative" spoken word to a larger audience.

== Music and composition ==
The album features one LP side of spoken word performances from Henry Rollins and another of instrumental music from the Black Flag lineup of guitarist Greg Ginn, bassist Kira Roessler and drummer Bill Stevenson. AllMusic's Pemberton Roach, who described the record as Black Flag's most "experimental", compared the spoken word material to Jim Morrison's works on live The Doors releases. AllAboutJazz's Trevor Maclaren stated: "It opens three points of interest: Rollins as the Beat Poet—sort of—the stoned dirge influence of Black Sabbath, and the instrumental jazz driven metal/punk that Ginn would utilize after dissolving Black Flag." Maclaren also added: "The distorted guitars and atonal feedback of players like Sonny Sharrock and James Blood Ulmer reign supreme in a sludgy Black Sabbath riff."

== Cover art ==
The cover art, which was created by Raymond Pettibon, pictures a man holding a gun to his head, while his wife and son's bodies lie on the floor, and his daughter crouches across the room from him, with blood over her right eye and on her chest. The caption on the cover reads November 23rd, 1963.

== Critical reception ==
Professional ratings
Review scores
Source	Rating
AllMusic	3/5 stars
The Encyclopedia of Popular Music	2/5 stars
The Great Rock Discography	4/10
MusicHound Rock	2/5 stars
The Rolling Stone Album Guide	2/5 stars
Spin Alternative Record Guide	2/10

In a retrospective review of the album, AllMusic critic Pemberton Roach wrote: "Although sounding at times like a high-school garage band attempting to perform Rush covers, Ginn and company play with a sense of desperation and punk rock fury that makes much of the music positively electrifying." Roach also added: "Overall, Family Man is an essential, if atypical, part of the Black Flag canon and should appeal to fans of Sun Ra, Ornette Coleman, or the New York "noise" scene as well." In 2006, All About Jazz's Trevor Maclaren stated that "for those who seek a real adventure and think that Last Exit was perhaps too extreme, Black Flag's Family Man and The Process of Weeding Out are choice lost gems."

Eric Weisbard of Spin Alternative Record Guide (1995) named it the worst of the four albums Black Flag released in 1984, opining that it is "half lame instrumentals, half Rollins inventing the poetry-slam spoken word thang, the latter of import historically at least: more Lolla foreshadowing!" Trouser Press's Ira Robbins comments that "Family Man deconstructs Black Flag into a side of Rollins reading his poetry and a side of group instrumentals."

== Track listing ==
All tracks are written by Henry Rollins, except where noted.

Side A
No.	Title	Writer(s)	Length
1.	"Family Man"		1:17
2.	"Salt on a Slug"		1:30
3.	"Hollywood Diary"		0:32
4.	"Let Your Fingers Do the Walking"		2:30
5.	"Shed Reading (Rattus Norvegicus)"		1:23
6.	"No Deposit – No Return"		0:40
7.	"Armageddon Man"	Ginn, Rollins	9:12

Side B
No.	Title	Writer(s)	Length
8.	"Long Lost Dog of It"	Ginn, Roessler, Stevenson	2:03
9.	"I Won't Stick Any of You Unless and Until I Can Stick All of You"	Ginn	5:48
10.	"Account for What?"	Ginn	4:18
11.	"The Pups Are Doggin' It"	Ginn, Roessler, Stevenson	4:13

== Personnel ==
- Henry Rollins – vocals (tracks 1–7)
- Greg Ginn – guitar (tracks 7–11)
- Kira Roessler – bass (tracks 7–11)
- Bill Stevenson – drums (tracks 7–11)
- Raymond Pettibon – artwork

== Charts ==
Chart (1984)	Peak position
UK Indie Chart	14
