= Nymphs (album) =

Studio album by Nymphs
- Released: 1991
- Recorded: 1990
- Genres: Glam metal; grunge
- Length: 42:14
- Label: Geffen
- Producer: Bill Price

Nymphs chronology
Nymphs (1991)	A Practical Guide to Astral Projection (1992)

Nymphs is the only studio album by the American rock band Nymphs, released in 1991 on Geffen Records. There were music videos made for "Imitating Angels" and "Sad and Damned". Despite Geffen's expensive promotional efforts, the album was a commercial failure.

The album was produced by Bill Price; its release was delayed after Tom Zutaut pulled Price to remix tracks by Guns N' Roses. Iggy Pop sang on "Supersonic".

== Musical style ==
Brian Flota of AllMusic proclaimed Nymphs to be "the last great glam-metal album". Dannii Leivers opined the record to "straddle glam and grunge".

== Critical reception ==
Professional ratings
Review scores
Source	Rating
AllMusic	4.5/5 stars
Classic Rock	4/5 stars
The Encyclopedia of Popular Music	3/5 stars
The Great Metal Discography	7/10
Kerrang!	5/5 stars
Metal Hammer	4/5
NME	4/10
The Philadelphia Inquirer	3/4 stars
Q	4/5 stars
Vox	8/10

The Vancouver Sun wrote that "[Inger] Lorre is a great hard-rock singer, with a clear, strong voice that pierces straight through the guitars that thunder and crash around her." The Sydney Morning Herald called it an "outstanding debut album," and wrote that, "Nymphs, the album, reeks of sex and the band's delivery is one of pure power and volume."

In June 2020, Nymphs was ranked in LouderSound's "10 Obscure but Absolutely Essential Grunge Albums".

== Track listing ==
All song by Nymphs.

No.	Title	Length
1.	"Just One Happy Day"	02:58
2.	"Cold"	02:20
3.	"2 Cats"	02:54
4.	"Imitating Angels"	04:24
5.	"Wasting My Days"	04:00
6.	"Heaven"	03:35
7.	"Supersonic"	03:22
8.	"Sad and Damned"	02:58
9.	"Death of a Scenester"	04:03
10.	"The River"	03:38
11.	"Revolt"	02:00
12.	"The Highway"	05:35
Total length:		42:14

== Personnel ==
- Inger Lorre – vocals
- Geoff Siegel – guitar
- Sam Merrick – guitar
- Alex Kirst – drums
- Cliff D. – bass
- Iggy Pop – vocals on "Supersonic"
