= Flyin' the Flannel =

1991 studio album by Firehose

Studio album by Firehose
- Released: April 23, 1991
- Recorded: January 21–30, 1991
- Studio: Mad Dog, Venice, CA
- Length: 41:19
- Label: Columbia
- Producer: Paul Q. Kolderie, Firehose

Firehose chronology
| Fromohio (1989) | Flyin' the Flannel (1991) | Mr. Machinery Operator (1993) |

Professional ratings
Review scores
| Source | Rating |
|---|---|
| AllMusic | 3.5/5 stars |

Flyin' the Flannel is the fourth album by the American alternative rock band Firehose. It was released in 1991, and was the band's first album after signing with the major label Columbia Records.

The album is considerably different in sound from its predecessor, Fromohio, described as "Speedier, heavier and more layered than ever before" with Spin magazine's review noting some riffs "occasionally verges on the metallic"

In 2014, the album placed fifth on the Alternative Nation site's "Top 10 Underrated 90's Alternative Rock Albums" list.

== Reception ==
Pitchfork said the album possessed "a lovable warmth that makes it easy to accept even its stranger digressions." Dave Alvin stated that he was "deeply honored" that fIREHOSE recorded a song dedicated to him.

== Track listing ==
1. "Down with the Bass" (Mike Watt)
2. "Up Finnegan's Ladder" (Watt)
3. "Can't Believe" (Ed Crawford)
4. "Walking the Cow" (Daniel Johnston)
5. "Flyin' the Flannel" (Watt)
6. "Epoxy, for Example" (Watt)
7. "O'er the Town of Pedro" (Watt)
8. "Too Long" (Crawford)
9. "The First Cuss" (Watt)
10. "Anti-misogyny Maneuver" (Watt)
11. "Toolin'" (Crawford)
12. "Song for Dave Alvin" (Watt)
13. "Tien an Man Dream Again" (Watt)
14. "Lost Colors" (Kira Roessler/Watt)
15. "Towin' the Line" (Joe Baiza/George Hurley/Watt)
16. "Losers, Boozers and Heroes" (Raymond Pettibon/Watt)
