= Justamente tres =

justamente tres

Studio album by dos
- Released: June 25, 1996
- Studio: Radio Tokyo
- Genre: Indie, experimental, punk
- Length: 42:48
- Label: Kill Rock Stars

Dos chronology
| Dos (1986) | justamente tres (1996) | dos y dos (2011) |

justamente tres ("just three") is an experimental indie album, the third by the band dos featuring Mike Watt (Minutemen) and Kira Roessler (Black Flag).

At the time, they believed this album might be their last (hence the "just three" title) as it was recorded shortly after Watt and Roessler divorced. This led to a fifteen year gap between this album and the followupl dos y dos.

Two of the album's tracks were later expanded upon and re-recorded for Mike Watt's solo album Ball-Hog or Tugboat?.

== Reception ==
Punknews.org gave the album 3.5 out of 5 stars and said "If ever there was a band to serve as a reminder for what "punk" really means as a form of expression, Dos should be it."

== Track listing ==
1. Down in the Dumps (Lana Wilson)
2. Dream of San Pedro (Mike Watt)
3. Imagine That (Justin Tubb)
4. Intense Song for Madonna (Watt)
5. 'Til the Blood Ran (Kira Roessler)
6. Sidemouse Advice (Watt)
7. Excerpts from a Captain's Log (Roessler/Watt)
8. To Each His Dulcinea (Joe Darion/Mitch Leigh)
9. Powerful Hankerin' (Watt)
10. Little Doll (Roessler)
11. Willow Weep for Me (Ann Ronell)
12. Even the Pain Has Changed (Roessler)
13. Formal Introduction (Watt)
14. Angel Face Is the Devil's Daughter (Freda Rente)
15. Number Seven (Roessler)
16. Do You Want New Wave or Do You Want the Truth? (Watt)
17. Number Five (Roessler)
