= Seratones =

American rock band

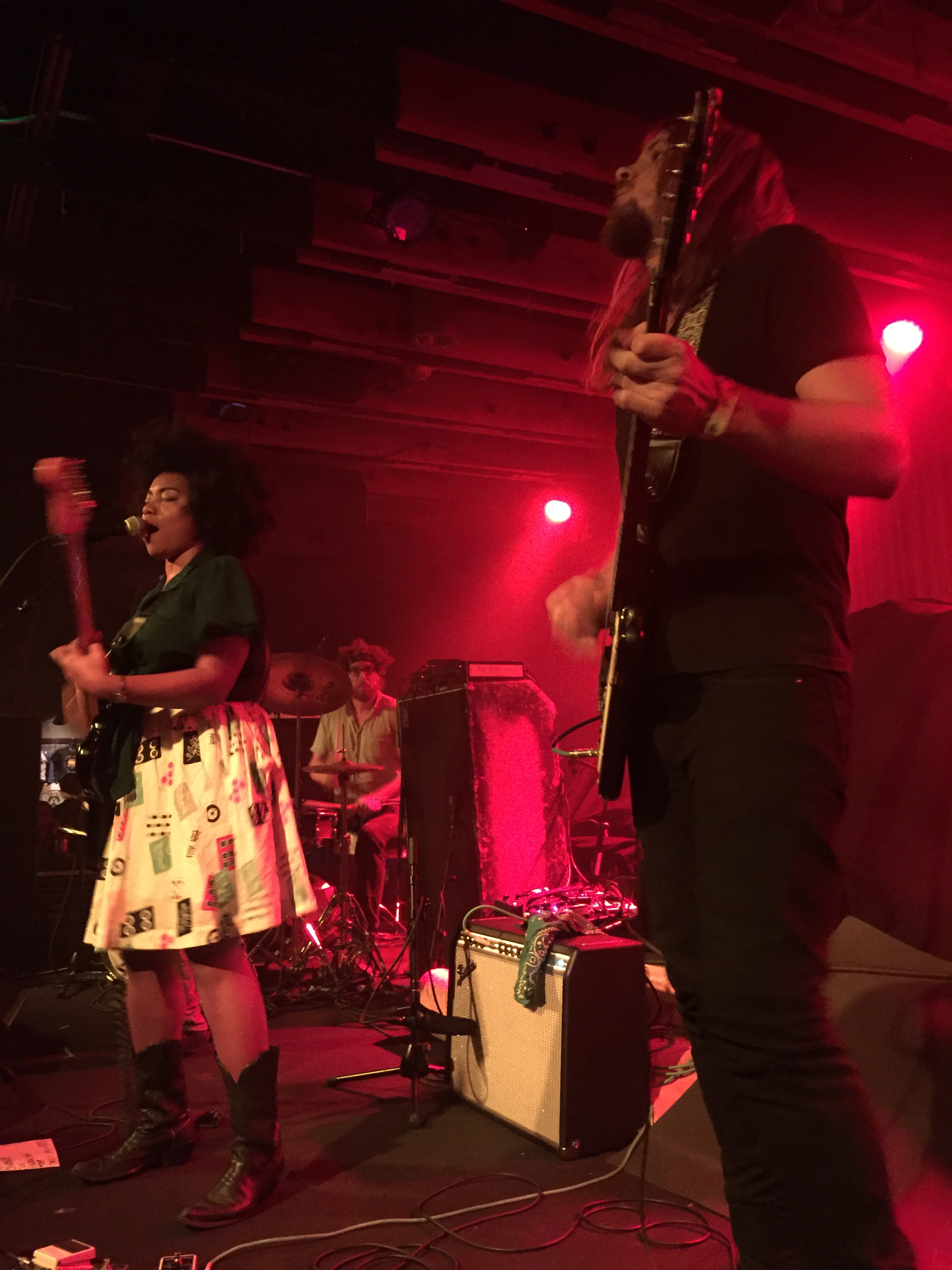
- From left to right: AJ Haynes, Jesse Gabriel, Connor Davis. Not shown: Adam Davis

Background information
- Origin: Shreveport, Louisiana, US
- Genres: Rock, soul
- Years active: 2013–present
- Labels: Fat Possum Records; New West Records
- Members: AJ Haynes; Travis Stewart; Adam Davis; Tyran Coker; Jesse Gabriel
- Past members: Connor Davis
- Website: seratones.band

Seratones are an American soul rock band formed in Shreveport, Louisiana in 2013. The group's original line-up consisted of AJ Haynes (vocals, guitar), Connor Davis (guitar), Adam Davis (bass guitar), and Jesse Gabriel (drums). Initially, a favorite of the Louisiana club circuit, the band rose to national recognition after signing with Fat Possum Records in 2015 and releasing their debut album, Get Gone, in 2016. The band's second album, Power, was released on New West Records in 2019 with additional band member Tyran Coker (keyboard), and Travis Stewart (guitar) replacing Connor Davis.

== History ==
Seratones are an American soul rock band formed in Shreveport, Louisiana, in 2013. The band name was created from the phrase "put it on wax" which in Spanish is the word "cera". In the music industry, the phrase means to record on vinyl. The band switched the name from Ceratones to Seratones because it reminded them of the brain chemical serotonin. The four members met through attending different punk rock shows around the area. The members shared different genres of music to discover 'their sound'. They are compared to bands such as Alabama Shakes, however, they add a blues, swinging, soul-stirring unique twist to rock 'n' roll. While performing in Arkansas with a band called "Ghost Bones", they were introduced to the lead singer of the band "NERVS". The vocalist worked for Fat Possum Records, and put them in contact with the president, Mathew Johnson. Seratones signed their first major three-album recording contract with Fat Possum Records in 2015. Seratones performed their single, "Chandelier", on the CBS This Morning from their first album Get Gone, released on May 6, 2016. In spring of 2016, the band went on tour to promote their new album.

On August 23, 2019, Seratones released their second studio album, Power, the band's first release on New West Records. The album was preceded by five singles including title track "Power", for which they also released a music video.

== Band members ==
Seratones members are AJ Haynes (vocals, guitar), Travis Stewart (guitar), Adam Davis (bass), Tyran Coker (keyboard), and Jesse Gabriel (drums). The original line-up consisted of four band members: AJ Haynes (vocals, guitar), Connor Davis (guitar), Adam Davis (bass), and Jesse Gabriel (drums). The lead vocalist, AJ Haynes, began singing in Brownsville Baptist church at age six. While gaining experience from a young age, Haynes also has singing in her genes since her mother was a singer in Japan before moving to the United States. Haynes is a high school teacher. Bassist Adam Davis, attributing his sound to Jimi Hendrix, is a residential and commercial painter.

== Awards and nominations ==
Seratones won their first award at the Louisiana Music Prize contest in 2013. After winning this prize, they continued to get noticed. While they did not win the final prize, the band entered NPR's Music Tiny Desk Contest in 2015. They were named one of Paste Magazine's "Top 20 new bands of 2015" and their song "Chandelier" was named by NME as "one of the best new tracks". The Seratones showcased at the South by South West music festival in March 2016.

=== Accolades ===
Year	Organization	Accolade	Artist/work	Ranked	Source
2015	Paste Magazine	The 20 Best New Bands of 2015	Seratones	16	
2019	Pop Magazine	Best Songs of 2019	"Power"	17	

== Discography ==
=== Studio albums ===
- Get Gone (2016)
- Power (2019)
- Love & Algorhythms (2022)

=== Singles ===
Title	Year	Peak chart positions	Album
Title	Year	US AAA	Album
"Gotta Get To Know Ya"	2019	16	POWER
"Over You"	2019	34	POWER
"Good Day"	2022	23	Love & Algorhythms

== Festivals ==
The Seratones performed at festivals including CMJ music festival 2015, Sloss fest 2016, at SxSW, Valley of the Vapors, Reading/Leeds, and Hangout Music Festival.
