= Slip It In =

Studio album by Black Flag
- Released: December 1984
- Recorded: June 1984
- Studio: Total Access (Redondo Beach, California)
- Genre: Hardcore punk; heavy metal
- Length: 38:37
- Label: SST
- Producer: Greg Ginn, Spot, Bill Stevenson

Black Flag chronology
Family Man (1984)	Slip It In (1984)	Live '84 (1984)

Slip It In is the fourth album by the American hardcore punk band Black Flag, released in 1984 by SST Records.

Slip It In is an extension of the sound Black Flag utilized on its second album My War: heavy, cathartic, intense, dense and progressive. The album pursued the newer, lengthier song arrangements that Black Flag would develop until its demise. It also features Henry Rollins' further development as a lyricist, contributing four of eight tracks on the album. This album also demonstrates Black Flag's increasing use of instrumentals, where Greg Ginn demonstrates his increasingly more complex playing style.

== Recording and style ==
Slip It In was recorded on a brief break on the continuous tour for My War, which saw Black Flag at their most ambitious. This year they would release three full-length albums and toured nearly constantly, with Rollins noting 178 performances for the year, and about that many for 1985. With Dukowski gone, Ginn ceded much of the spotlight to Rollins, who had expressed some discomfort over being the group's de facto spokesman, while Ginn was the recognized leader (Ginn wrote the majority of the group's songs and lyrics).

In many ways, Slip It In is a fusion of the styles utilized on their previous releases (with vocals), Damaged and My War. The songs are inspired by heavy metal, yet the material also shows traces of "sludgy 'pre-grunge' metal, hardcore punk, and thrash to blues rock and jazz." The track "My Ghetto" even contains traces of a musical style that would later become known as powerviolence. At the middle point of the album, there is an instrumental track called "Obliteration" which highlights Ginn's chord progressions where Brandon Sideleau of Punknews.org claims that it "mashes sludge and jazz into an ominous hybrid."

== Cover art ==
The album cover features a provocative piece of Raymond Pettibon artwork, as many of Black Flag's album/single covers and gig fliers do. The image is of a nun embracing a bare male leg. Bassist Kira Roessler has expressed complex feelings about the image. For example, she has said "I didn't really recognize that they might have interesting ideas about women and that me being in the band was controversial. I didn't think that way until I saw the cover of Slip It In and I kind of realized, for one thing, they certainly didn't glorify women. That cover does not glorify women." She has also indicated that she has come to terms with the cover art choice.

== Music video ==
A low-budget music video was produced for the album's title track. It revolves around a teacher lip syncing to the vocals to the song along with the class and cuts to clips to the band performing to the song. The video ends with the teacher telling about the album coming out and promoting their "students" to see them on their tour.

== Reception ==
Professional ratings
Review scores
Source	Rating
AllMusic	3/5 stars
Christgau's Record Guide	C+
The Encyclopedia of Popular Music	3/5 stars
The Great Rock Discography	5/10
MusicHound Rock	2/5 stars
Punknews.org	5 stars
The Rolling Stone Album Guide	3/5 stars

Slip It In has received mixed reviews over the years. Shortly after its release, Ira Robbins of Trouser Press dismissed the album, writing that it "blurs the line between moronic punk and moronic metal. Songs are mostly built on trite riffs repeated endlessly; the rude lyrics of the title song are performed complete with enthusiastic sex noises for anyone who fails to grasp the point and/or be offended by it." Robert Christgau was also quite negative, despite reserving some praise for the song "You're Not Evil".

In retrospective reviews, John Dougan of AllMusic wrote that while the album was a bit better than its predecessor and featured "increasingly avant-garde and exciting" guitarwork from Greg Ginn (which was compared to James Blood Ulmer), it "still wanders a bit". Brandon Sideleau of Punknews.org calls it "a classic and a landmark for independent music." He defends the title track, calling it a "punk metal masterpiece often unfairly seen as sexist, when in reality it's quite the opposite. Greg Ginn's lyrics are raunchy and angry, but the song is more about people and their choices than anything else."

== Track listing ==
Side A
No.	Title	Writer(s)	Length
1.	"Slip It In"	Greg Ginn	6:17
2.	"Black Coffee"	Ginn	4:53
3.	"Wound Up"	Ginn, Henry Rollins	4:17
4.	"Rat's Eyes"	Ginn, Rollins	3:57

Side B
No.	Title	Writer(s)	Length
5.	"Obliteration" (instrumental)	Ginn	5:51
6.	"The Bars"	Chuck Dukowski, Rollins	4:20
7.	"My Ghetto"	Ginn, Rollins	2:02
8.	"You're Not Evil"	Ginn	7:00

== Personnel ==
Black Flag

- Henry Rollins – vocals
- Greg Ginn – guitars, screams on "You're Not Evil"
- Kira Roessler – bass
- Bill Stevenson – drums

Additional personnel

- Suzi Gardner - backing vocals on "Slip it In"
- Davo Claassen – backing vocals on "Slip it In" and "Black Coffee"
- Chuck Dukowski – screams on "You're Not Evil"
- Spot – production, engineering, mixing
- Greg Ginn – production
- Bill Stevenson – production
- Raymond Pettibon – artwork

== Charts ==
Chart (1984)	Peak position
UK Indie Chart	8
