= My War =

Studio album by Black Flag
- Released: March 1984
- Recorded: December 1983
- Studio: Total Access, Redondo Beach, California
- Genre: Hardcore punk; post-hardcore
- Length: 40:22
- Label: SST (023)
- Producer: Greg Ginn; Spot; Bill Stevenson

Black Flag chronology
The First Four Years (1983)	My War (1984)	Family Man (1984)

My War is the second studio album by American band Black Flag. It was the first of three full-length albums the band released in 1984. The album polarized fans due to the LP's B-side, on which the band slowed down to a heavy, Black Sabbath-esque trudge after establishing expectations as a faster hardcore punk band on its first album, Damaged (1981).

After a period of legal troubles which prohibited the band from using its own name on recordings, Black Flag returned to the studio with a new approach to its music that incorporated a greater variety of styles, resulting in a sound orthodox punks found difficult to accept. The line-up had shrunk from five members to three: vocalist Henry Rollins, drummer Bill Stevenson, and co-founding guitarist Greg Ginn. Ginn doubled on bass guitar under the name "Dale Nixon" for the recording as bassist Chuck Dukowski left the band shortly before recording; the album includes two tracks Dukowski wrote.

The A-side of the LP is composed of six generally high-paced, thrashy hardcore tracks, featuring guitar solos unusual in punk music. On the B-side are three heavy tracks that each breach six minutes with ponderously slow tempos and dark, unrelenting lyrics of self-hatred. The band members had grown their hair long when they toured the album in 1984, which along with the change in sound further alienated their hardcore skinhead fanbase. Despite mixed reception at the time of the album's release, My War has gained a reputation as one of Black Flag's seminal releases and had a major influence on the development of post-hardcore, sludge metal, grunge, and math rock.

== Background ==
In 1978, Black Flag guitarist and cofounder Greg Ginn converted his ham radio business Solid State Transmitters to SST Records to release the band's first EP Nervous Breakdown. Soon SST was releasing recordings by other bands as well, beginning with Minutemen's Paranoid Time in 1980.

Black Flag recorded its first album Damaged in 1981 at Unicorn Studios and arranged a deal with the studio's record label Unicorn Records, which had distribution with MCA Records. MCA label president Al Bergamo halted the release after hearing the record, calling it "anti-parent"—though SST co-owner Joe Carducci asserts this was a pretense for MCA to sever relations with the financially troubled Unicorn. The band obtained and distributed the already-pressed 20000 copies of Damaged and adorned it with a label displaying Bergamo's "anti-parent" quote. Legal troubles erupted when SST claimed unpaid royalties from Unicorn and Unicorn successfully counter-sued, resulting in five days in jail for Ginn and co-founding bassist Chuck Dukowski and an injunction prohibiting the band from releasing material under its own name. The double album Everything Went Black—a compilation of earlier, unreleased material—appeared from SST in 1982 without the band's name on it. Unicorn's bankruptcy in 1983 freed the band from the injunction.

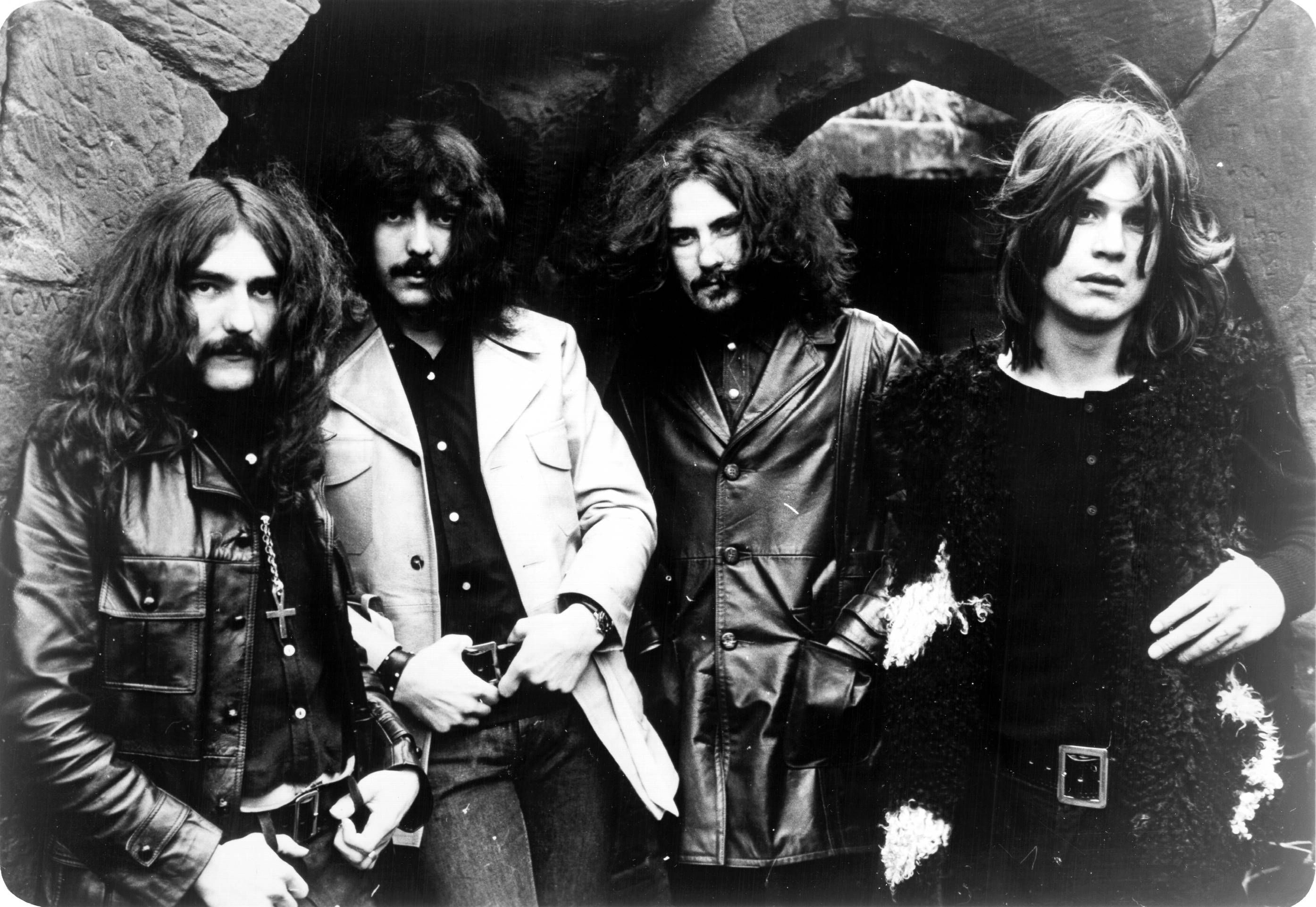
Black Sabbath was a major influence on My War's B-side.

Ginn had grown frustrated with the hardcore punk scene, and told the Los Angeles Times in early 1983: "[W]e've never been out to create this punk scene" they had been credited with spearheading; "We want people to listen to us as a band rather than as a stereotype ... A lot of what you call the punk scene is really backward, and it always has been." Following the release of Damaged, Black Flag absorbed a wider range of influences from the more experimental hardcore of Flipper, Void, and Fang. They listened to little contemporary punk. Ginn was drawn to Ronnie James Dio's work in Black Sabbath and Dio, as well as earlier favorites from his pre-punk days, including Ted Nugent, Black Oak Arkansas, MC5, ZZ Top, Deep Purple, Uriah Heep, and others. Music journalist Andrew Earles believes the band was influenced by the tiny but growing doom metal scene led by Saint Vitus (who released via SST). Ginn jealously guarded the new material, fearing other bands would capitalize on the new approach, and bemoaned that fans were unaware of how the band had progressed since they were unable to release recordings.

The band toured extensively in North America and Europe to often hostile, violent hardcore punk crowds. The disciplined group rehearsed obsessively, but there was little friendship between members: vocalist Henry Rollins was introverted and Ginn cold and demanding. Dukowski felt that Rollins' vocal approach was better suited than that of the band's earlier three singers to the new material he was writing such as "I Love You" and "My War". Dukowski, who also wrote poetry and fiction, encouraged Rollins to write as well, and Rollins found inspiration in Dukowski's bleak lyrical style.

The band recorded a set of ten demo tracks at Total Access studios in 1982 for a planned follow-up to Damaged on which Chuck Biscuits replaced Damaged drummer Robo. The rest of the lineup consisted of Ginn and former vocalist Dez Cadena on guitars, Rollins on vocals, and Dukowski on bass. The band explored new sounds on these tracks, which tended to feature a riff-heavy heavy-metal edge and noisy, energetic free guitar soloing from Ginn. The album never materialized, and the heavily bootlegged demos have never been officially released; re-recordings of several of the tracks from the session were to feature on My War and other later albums. The line-up did not last long—frustrated with the band's legal troubles, Biscuits left in December 1982, replaced by Bill Stevenson, and in 1983 Cadena left to form DC3. Ginn had been frustrated with Dukowski's sense of rhythm, and in Germany during a European tour in 1983 gave Dukowski an ultimatum to quit, or Ginn himself would leave. Dukowski left the band, but stayed on to co-run SST.

With Unicorn's demise in 1983, Black Flag was able to release the material they had written since 1981. Eager to get back in the studio but still without a bassist, Ginn took on bass duties under the pseudonym "Dale Nixon" and practiced the new material with Stevenson up to eight hours a day, teaching the drummer to slow down and let the rhythm "ooze out" at a pace Stevenson was unused to; the band called this approach the "socialist groove", as all beats were equally spaced. With Spot as producer and $200,000 in debt, Ginn, Rollins, and Stevenson headed to the studio to record My War.

== Music ==
The sides on the original LP divide the tracks into stylistic halves. The first half features six tracks that are in the same style that the band originated on their previous album Damaged and closes with a noisy freak-out, "The Swinging Man". Dukowski penned the opening title track. Ginn's "Can't Decide" follows, a gloomy ode to frustration: "I conceal my feelings / So I don't have to explain / What I can't explain anyway". "Beat My Head Against the Wall" rails at conformity and the band's experience with a major label: "Swimming in the mainstream / Is such a lame, lame dream". Dukowski's "I Love You" parodies pop ballads with lyrics of violence and dysfunction in a relationship gone wrong. Ginn and Rollins share credit on the metallic "Forever Time" and the noisy "Swinging Man".

"Scream"
"Scream" typifies the Black Sabbath-like plodding of the B-side of My War.

The second side's three tracks each clock in at over six minutes. Reviewers have described them as an early cross-pollination between punk and metal, a plodding Black Sabbath-esque sludge metal, or proto-noise rock style, depending on how they are viewed. On "Three Nights", Rollins compares himself to feces stuck to his shoe: "And I've been grinding that stink into the dirt / For a long time now". Against a slow, heavy, start-and-stop bass riff and a constant drum thudding, Rollins closes "Scream" with a bellow after delivering the Ginn-penned lines: "I may be a big baby / But I'll scream in your ear / 'Til I find out / Just what it is I am doing here". The closing track of Damaged, "Damaged I", presaged this dark, heavier style, and a slower pace that brings the track length to nearly seven minutes, the longest on the album.

== Reception and legacy ==
Professional ratings
Review scores
Source	Rating
AllMusic	2/5 stars
The Boston Phoenix	1.5/4 stars
Christgau's Record Guide	B−
The Encyclopedia of Popular Music	3/5 stars
The Great Rock Discography	6/10
MusicHound Rock	3/5 stars
Punknews.org	5/5 stars
Pitchfork	9.0/10
(The New) Rolling Stone Album Guide	3/5 stars
Spin Alternative Record Guide	3/10

... within the hardcore scene, side two of My War was as heretical as Bob Dylan playing electric guitar on one side of Bringing It All Back Home.

— Michael Azerrad, Our Band Could Be Your Life (2001)

One of the pioneer early hardcore bands, Black Flag, became one of the early leading post-hardcore bands by utilising slower tempos, odd time signatures (3/8, 5/4, 7/4), abrupt tempo and structural changes, dissonant riffs that border on 12-tone music ... and guitarist Greg Ginn's atonal, free-form solos.

— Doyle Green

My War was the first of four Black Flag releases in 1984, a year that also saw Family Man, Slip It In, and Live '84 appear from SST. It is considered to be one of the first post-hardcore albums along with Hüsker Dü's Zen Arcade and Minutemen's Double Nickels on the Dime in the same year.

The album reached no. 5 on the UK Indie Charts. Black Flag toured the My War material from March 1984, with the Nig-Heist and Meat Puppets as opening acts. It had been a year since the band had toured, and Rollins, Ginn, and Stevenson had grown out their hair; punks associated long hair with the hippies and metalheads they loathed and found it dissonant with Rollins' accepted image as a hardcore skinhead.

My War polarized Black Flag fans; it alienated those who wanted the band to stay true to its simple hardcore roots and who were put off by the length of the songs, the riff-heaviness, and the solos—elements widely thought of as un-punk.

Critics dissatisfied with the band's direction compared it to heavy metal, though contemporary metal bands with such a sound were rare, and the band rejected the classification. The ideology of many fans and critics demanded that hardcore punk bands remain true to the genre's roots, with short, fast songs, typically lacking solos. My War thus came across as a betrayal of those roots, and critics associated the differences with metal, a genre the hardcore punk community despised. Examples include Tim Yohannon disparaging the album in Maximumrocknroll as "like Black Flag doing an imitation of Iron Maiden imitating Black Flag on a bad day", and Howard Hampton at the Boston Phoenix deriding it for "resorting to standard [heavy metal] machinations". Rollins countered critics, stating, "Take the 'metal' out of 'heavy metal' and that's what we are—it's just heavy ... Heavy metal is a defined form. Black Flag is not a defined form." Ginn had long criticized the hardcore punk scene's narrowmindedness, and following Black Flag's breakup in 1986, and in reaction to criticism of Black Flag's later output following its breakup in 1986, Ginn derided the underground scene as "really conservative", whose audience "demands something familiar".

The muffled sound of the album's production has attracted criticism; Stevie Chick disparaged the lack of character in Ginn's bass-playing on "My War" when compared to the 1982 demo of the same song with Dukowski on bass. Michael Azerrad praised the strength of the material while denigrating the "frustrating lack of ensemble feel" as the album was recorded without a full lineup. Critic Clay Jarvis commended the album, emphasizing the risks taken on it and its influence, calling it "more a test than an album", and saying, "independent music is stronger because Black Flag formulated it". John Dougan at AllMusic called the A-side of the album "quite good", but described the B-side as "self-indulgence masquerading as inspiration and about as much fun as wading through a tar pit". Robert Christgau considered the B-side a "waste". Howard Hampton found it "unbearably boring", and Tim Yohannon called the B-side "sheer torture". Eric Weisbard opines that the album opens strongly but quickly descends into "slow metal or midtempo whinnying guitars, loungecore with Henry as Bill Murray."

The album had a great influence on the "hardcore-meets-Sabbath" sounds of Mudhoney, Melvins, and Nirvana. The first punk concert Nirvana frontman Kurt Cobain attended was a Black Flag show during the My War tour, and he listed My War on his list of top fifty albums. Mark Arm of Mudhoney related he was moved to tears at a Black Flag concert in 1983 when he was first exposed to "Nothing Left Inside", and the experience inspired him to seek out bands like Black Sabbath. Mudhoney guitarist Steve Turner has said of the album's impact on grunge, "I swear, that record instantly made the Melvins slow down to a crawl. Because The Melvins when they started, they were a fairly tight hardcore band and My War came out and they suddenly slowed down. And I know it was a huge influence on us as well. Even in the Green River days."

== Track listing ==
Side A
No.	Title	Writer(s)	Length
1.	"My War"	Chuck Dukowski	3:46
2.	"Can't Decide"	Greg Ginn	5:22
3.	"Beat My Head Against the Wall"	Ginn	2:34
4.	"I Love You"	Dukowski	3:27
5.	"Forever Time"	Ginn, Henry Rollins	2:30
6.	"The Swinging Man"	Ginn, Rollins	3:04

Side B
No.	Title	Writer(s)	Length
7.	"Nothing Left Inside"	Ginn, Rollins	6:44
8.	"Three Nights"	Ginn, Rollins	6:03
9.	"Scream"	Ginn	6:52
Total length:			40:22

== Personnel ==
Black Flag

- Henry Rollins – vocals
- Greg Ginn – guitars, bass (credited as Dale Nixon)
- Bill Stevenson – drums

Production and artwork

- Spot – production, engineering, mixing
- Greg Ginn – production
- Bill Stevenson – production
- Raymond Pettibon – artwork
- Chuck Dukowski – songwriting (track 1, 4), additional songwriting
