= Live Totem Pole =

EP by Firehose
- Released: 1992
- Recorded: Live at the Palomino Club in North Hollywood, CA on August 16, 1991.
- Genre: Alternative rock
- Length: 20:16
- Label: Columbia
- Producer: Jim Dunbar, Paul Q. Kolderie

Professional ratings
Review scores
Source	Rating
Allmusic	3/5 stars

Live Totem Pole is a live EP released in 1992 by Firehose. It consists of seven tracks, five of which are cover versions. The cover of Blue Öyster Cult's "The Red and the Black" had been recorded by Minutemen (Watt and Hurley's seminal punk rock band) and released on 3-Way Tie (For Last).

Watt's introduction to "Revolution (Part Two)" contains a nod to Gibby Haynes, the lead singer of Butthole Surfers — "This is a song for today. Hope I don't fuck it up, Gibby." The Minutemen had also been longtime fans of the UK band Wire, which led to their decision to add a cover of the popular song Mannequin along with the song Slack Motherfucker by Superchunk.

The EP has become a collector's item due to its discontinuation shortly after its release.

The cover art is by Raymond Pettibon.

== Track listing ==
1. "The Red And The Black" (Blue Öyster Cult) – 3:34
2. "Sophisticated Bitch" (Public Enemy) – 3:52
3. "Revolution (Part Two)" (Butthole Surfers) – 3:09
4. "Slack Motherfucker" (Superchunk) – 2:40
5. "What Gets Heard" (Mike Watt) – 2:20
6. "Mannequin" (Wire) – 2:26
7. "Makin' The Freeway" (Watt) – 2:15

== Personnel ==
- Mike Watt – bass, vocals
- Ed Crawford – guitar, vocals
- George Hurley – drums
