= Get Gone (album) =

Studio album by Seratones
- Released: May 6, 2016
- Studio: Dial Back Sound (Water Valley, MS)
- Genre: Rock
- Length: 39:26
- Label: Fat Possum
- Producer: Jimbo Mathus

Seratones chronology
Get Gone (2016)	POWER (2019)

Get Gone is the debut studio album by American rock band Seratones. It was released on May 6, 2016, through Fat Possum Records. Recording sessions took place at Dial Back Sound studios in Water Valley, Mississippi. Production was handled by Jimbo Mathus with Clay Jones serving as additional producer on four out of eleven tracks.

== Critical reception ==
Professional ratings
Aggregate scores
Source	Rating
Metacritic	72/100
Review scores
Source	Rating
AllMusic	4/5 stars
Classic Rock	3.5/5 stars
No Ripcord	8/10
Pitchfork	6.8/10
PopMatters	6/10
Record Collector	4/5 stars
The Line of Best Fit	7.5/10

Get Gone was met with generally favorable reviews from music critics. At Metacritic, which assigns a normalized rating out of 100 to reviews from mainstream publications, the album received an average score of 72, based on ten reviews.

AllMusic's Mark Deming praised the album, calling it a "very special dose of rock and soul, and one of the most purely enjoyable debuts of 2016". Carl Purvis of No Ripcord also praised the work with words: "from the saucy R'n'B of 'Tide' and 'Chandelier', the frenetic 'Choking on Your Spit' to the gorgeous, laid-bare swoon of 'Keep Me', Get Gone is an expertly accomplished piece of work from a band still fledgling in their career". Kris Needs of Record Collector wrote: "Haynes' mellifluous voice hits home throughout, particularly effective on slower burners such as 'Tide' and 'Keep Me', invoking a deeper hoodoo on 'Kingdom Come' and 'Don't Need It'". Kevin Irwin of The Line of Best Fit simply resumed: "the formula might not be a new one, and ultimately Seratones are unlikely to change the world, but they will make your day". Pete Feenstra of Classic Rock saw the album as a "tumble dryer full of retro ideas given a contemporary currency by their restless drive, which evades categorisation". Allison Hussey of Pitchfork found that the lead singer A.J. Haynes "does so much work on Get Gone that you wind up hoping she follows through on her promise".

In his mixed review for PopMatters, Dustin Ragucos wrote: "Get Gone might not show its strengths in its lyricism, but it makes up for that by being a talented culmination of energy".

== Track listing ==
No.	Title	Producer(s)	Length
1.	"Chokin' on Your Spit"	Jimbo Mathus	2:29
2.	"Headtrip"	Jimbo Mathus	3:04
3.	"Tide"	Jimbo Mathus; Clay Jones (add.)	4:40
4.	"Chandelier"	Jimbo Mathus	3:01
5.	"Sun"	Jimbo Mathus	3:16
6.	"Get Gone"	Jimbo Mathus	4:00
7.	"Trees"	Jimbo Mathus; Clay Jones (add.)	2:58
8.	"Kingdom Come"	Jimbo Mathus	3:00
9.	"Don't Need It"	Jimbo Mathus	4:08
10.	"Take It Easy"	Jimbo Mathus; Clay Jones (add.)	4:32
11.	"Keep Me"	Jimbo Mathus; Clay Jones (add.)	4:18
Total length:			39:26

== Personnel ==
- A.J. Haynes – vocals
- Connor Davis – guitar
- Adam Davis – bass
- Jesse Gabriel – drums
- James H. "Jimbo Mathus" Mathis Jr. – producer
- Clay Jones – additional producer (tracks: 3, 7, 10, 11), mixing
- Bronson Tew – engineering
- Scott Bomar – engineering
- Darren Osborn – additional engineering (track 9)
- Matthew Barnhart – mastering
- Nate Treme – artwork
- Shannon O'Rear – photography
