= Let's Get Gone, Real Gone for a Change =

Let's Get Real, Real Gone for a Change

Studio album by Gone
- Released: 1986
- Studio: Hit City West
- Genres: Hardcore punk, punk jazz, jazz fusion, heavy metal
- Length: 35:44
- Label: SST (061)
- Producer: Greg Ginn

Gone chronology
Let's Get Real, Real Gone for a Change (1986)	Gone II - But Never Too Gone! (1982)

Let's Get Real, Real Gone for a Change is the debut album from punk jazz band Gone. It was released by SST in 1986.

Continuing where mid-1980s era Black Flag left off, Greg Ginn's band combines 1970s riff-rock with jazz tempos and a punkish-verve.

== Track listing ==
- All songs written and arranged by Gone.

No.	Title	Length
1.	"Insidious Detraction"	3:59
2.	"Get Gone"	3:57
3.	"Peter Gone"	2:27
4.	"Rosanne"	3:35
5.	"Climbing Rat's Wall"	2:11
6.	"Watch the 'Tractor"	2:10
7.	"Last Days of Being Stepped On"	2:34
8.	"Ch. 69"	3:23
9.	"Lawndale Rock City"	3:25
10.	"The Fifth Course Suite: A. Hypercharge B. The Wait"	8:03
Total length:		35:44

== Personnel ==
Gone

- Greg Ginn - guitars
- Andrew Weiss - bass, keyboards, sampling
- Sim Cain - drums
