= Nymphs (band) =

American alternative rock band

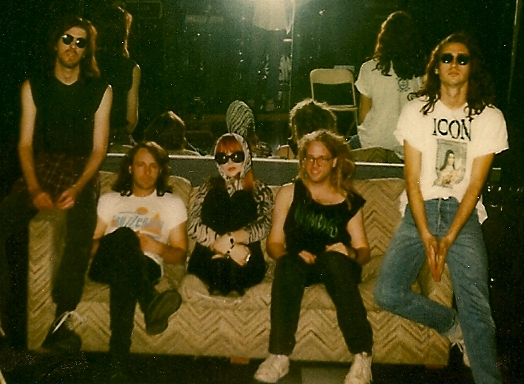
- The Nymphs in 1989. From left to right: Cliff Jones, Alex Kirst, Inger Lorre, Sam Merrick, and Geoff Siegel

Background information
- Origin: New Jersey, U.S.
- Genres: Alternative rock, punk rock, glam metal, hard rock
- Years active: 1985–1992; 2006; 2016–2017
- Label: DGC
- Past members: Inger Lorre; Bobby Belltower; Manfred Hoffer; Geoff Siegel; Sam Merrick; Mario Tremaine; Sean Romin; Joe Perez; T.J. Rauche; Jim Barnett; Rob Ritter; Cliff D.; Gabe Hammond; Angelique Congleton; Ricardo Torres; Alex Kirst; Aaron Cruz; Jordan Lawson; Eric James Contreras

Nymphs was an American alternative rock band that performed in the late 1980s and early 1990s with lead singer Inger Lorre. The band was signed to Geffen Records and released their debut album in 1991. The Nymphs are known for their wild stage shows and their rebellious attitude towards record companies. The band formed in 1985 and broke up in 1992, formed again in 2016, and broke up the same year, later reforming in 2017.

== Band history ==
Lorre and Bobby Belltower formed the band in New Jersey in the mid 1980s. The band moved to Los Angeles to pursue their musical careers and caught the attention of punk rock singer Keith Morris, who managed the band for a time. After two members returned to New Jersey, Inger and Geoff Siegel recruited guitarist Sam Merrick, drummer Alex Kirst and bass player Cliff D. (Cliff Jones).

The band was hoping to sign with an alternative label such as Alternative Tentacles, but their reputation led to interest from the major labels. However, the band's wild behavior led to some companies losing interest.

Nymphs made an appearance in the 1990 film Bad Influence as a band playing in a club.

Iggy Pop sang vocals on the track "Supersonic" from the debut album.

It was at about this time that Nymphs began to have problems with their label. Almost two years had passed since Nymphs had completed their album. Lorre was losing her battle with heroin and in an alcohol induced fit she urinated on the desk of A&R man Tom Zutaut. Rolling Stone quipped, 'Talk about being pissed at your record label.'"

Things came to a head when Inger Lorre performed fellatio on her then-boyfriend, Rodney Eastman, on stage during their set at the Marquis club in Anaheim, California, in 1992. Shortly afterwards, Lorre was fired from the band after she refused to go onstage during a concert that year in Miami opening for Peter Murphy. The band broke up soon after.

After Nymphs, Inger Lorre went on to record with Jeff Buckley and release solo albums. Alex Kirst went on to play drums for Iggy Pop. Geoff Siegel went on to do A&R for Columbia and Giant Records. Sam Merrick briefly returned to his original band, Leaving Trains. He now plays guitar in Boise, Idaho based band a.k.a. Belle. Lorre reformed the Nymphs with a new lineup for some performances in 2006.

Alex Kirst died on January 13, 2011, as the result of a car accident. His body was found just before midnight near Date Palm and Gerald Ford Drive in Cathedral City, California. He was 47. Kirst is the brother of guitarist Whitey Kirst, who has also played with Iggy Pop.

In the summer of 2016, Inger announced Nymphs were re-forming and going back into the studio with new material for the first time in over 20 years. A new album and touring would follow. The news spread through various magazines, television interviews and online social media. The new band lineup would bring back Lorre with all new members including Mario Tremaine (guitar), Jordan Lawson (bass), Aaron Cruz (guitar) and Eric James Contreras (drums). However, after several brief studio rehearsals, a cover of Dolly Parton's Hard Candy Christmas for Amazon, and an appearance at The Viper Room in Hollywood, California, the newly formed Nymphs called it quits almost as quickly as they got started.

November 18, 2016, a reissue of Nymphs' one and only Geffen release from 1991, now an underground classic was released by Rock Candy Records in celebration of the 25th anniversary of the original Geffen release. The reissue was remastered and included a 16-page full-color booklet containing a 3,500 word essay, enhanced artwork with previously unseen photos, interviews and band history.

As of April 2017 Nymphs’ lineup consisted of Inger Lorre (vocals-keyboards), Joe Perez (lead guitar), T.J. (rhythm guitar), Angelique Congleton (bass-vocals) and Eric James Contreras (drums). The new Nymphs lineup began writing/rehearsing/recording new material to be released. A live recording from a 2016 show at the famous Viper Room in Hollywood was released in 2017.

Inger Lorre died October 16, 2024.

== Discography ==
Studio albums

Title	Album details	Sales
Nymphs	Released: October 29, 1991; Label: DGC; Format: CD, CS, LP	WW: 75,000

Extended plays

Title	EP details
A Practical Guide to Astral Projection	Released: June 29, 1992; Label: DGC; Format: CD, CS, LP

== Band members ==
Final lineup

- Inger Lorre – vocals (1985–1992, 2006, 2016–2017; died 2024)
- Joe Perez – lead guitar (2017)
- T.J. Rauche – rhythm guitar (2017)
- Angelique Congleton – bass, vocals (2017)
- Eric James Contreras – drums (2016–2017)

Past members

- Bobby Belltower – lead guitar (1985–1988)
- Geoff Siegel (a.k.a. jet freedom) – lead guitar (1988–1992)
- Manfred Hoffer – rhythm guitar (1985–1987)
- Sam Merrick – rhythm guitar (1988–1992)
- Sean Romin – guitar (2016)
- Mario Tremaine – guitar (2016)
- Jordan Lawson - Bass (2016)
- Aaron Cruz - guitar ( 2016)
- Jordan Lawson - bass (2016)
- "Psycho Red" Jim Barnett – bass (1985–1987)
- Rob Ritter (a.k.a. Rob Graves) – bass (1988; died 1990)
- Cliff D. (a.k.a. Cliff Jones) – bass (1988–1992)
- Gabe Hammond – bass (2016)
- Ricardo Torres – drums (1986)
- Alex Kirst – drums (1987–1992; died 2011)
