= Getting Even (album) =

Studio album by Greg Ginn
- Released: 1993
- Recorded: Cruz, 1993
- Genre: Hard rock
- Length: 31:02
- Label: Cruz
- Producer: Greg Ginn

Greg Ginn chronology
Getting Even (1993)	Payday (1993)

Getting Even is the first solo album by the American musician Greg Ginn, released in 1993 on Cruz Records. Ginn also produced the album. Most of the songs barely last two minutes.

== Critical reception ==
Professional ratings
Review scores
Source	Rating
AllMusic	4.5/5 stars
Punknews.org	5/5 stars

Guitar Player wrote that "Ginn remains a distinctive stylist; his angular, willfully sloppy lines owe more than a little to 'out' jazz."

== Track listing ==
1. "I've Changed" – 1:25
2. "Kill Burn Fluff" – 2:04
3. "You Drive Me Crazy" – 3:40
4. "Pig MF" – 1:33
5. "Hard Thing" – 3:05
6. "Payday" – 1:24
7. "Nightmares" – 2:37
8. "Torn" – 2:26
9. "PF Flyer" – 1:18
10. "I Can't Wait" - 2:31
11. "Short Fuse" - 1:58
12. "Not That Simple" - 1:30
13. "Yes Officer" - 2:25
14. "Crawling Inside" - 3:06

== Personnel ==
- Greg Ginn - guitar, bass guitar, vocals, producer
- David Raven - drums

Technical

- Steve Fisk - engineer
- Andy Batwinas - engineer, mixing
- John Golden - mastering
