= Live '84 =

Live album by Black Flag
- Released: December 1984
- Recorded: August 26, 1984
- Venues: The Stone, San Francisco, California
- Genre: Hardcore punk
- Length: 75:28
- Label: SST (030)
- Producer: Greg Ginn

Black Flag chronology
Slip It In (1984)	Live '84 (1984)	Loose Nut (1985)

Live '84 is an album released by Black Flag in 1984 on SST Records. It is a live recording of a show played in 1984 and features mostly tracks from My War and Slip It In. A video was shot simultaneously and was briefly available through SST; the now-out-of-print video has been widely bootlegged.

The album was originally issued as a cassette-only release, almost simultaneously with Slip It In. In 1998, Greg Ginn remixed the album for CD reissue.

== Recording ==
The album was recorded at the Stone nightclub in San Francisco, CA.

== Critical reception ==
Professional ratings
Review scores
Source	Rating
AllMusic	4/5 stars
Alternative Rock	8/10
The Boston Phoenix	3.5/4 stars
The Encyclopedia of Popular Music	2/5 stars
MusicHound Rock: The Essential Album Guide	1.5/5 stars
Punknews.org	4/5 stars
The Rolling Stone Album Guide	1.5/5 stars
Spin Alternative Record Guide	4/10

Maximum Rocknroll called the album "a superior quality live tape showcasing an evening with a seminal, legendary, masochistic, poignant, chaotic beast of an outfit who have not lost one iota of aggro." Trouser Press wrote that "Black Flag concerts were typically an utter mess, which suits the songs perfectly, making this chaotic explosion naturally one of their best releases." The Spin Alternative Record Guide deemed it "tolerable until the lounge-core latter half of side two."

== Track listing ==
1. "The Process of Weeding Out" (Greg Ginn) – 8:31
2. "Nervous Breakdown" (Ginn) – 2:06
3. "Can't Decide" (Ginn) – 5:01
4. "Slip It In" (Ginn) – 5:54
5. "My Ghetto" (Henry Rollins/Ginn) – 1:14
6. "Black Coffee" (Ginn) – 4:53
7. "I Won't Stick Any of You Unless and Until I Can Stick All of You!" (Ginn) – 4:53
8. "Forever Time" (Rollins/Ginn) – 2:20
9. "Fix Me" (Ginn) – 0:53
10. "Six Pack" (Ginn) – 2:26
11. "My War" (Chuck Dukowski) – 3:34
12. "Jealous Again" (Ginn) – 1:59
13. "I Love You" (Dukowski) – 3:19
14. "Swinging Man" (Rollins/Ginn) – 3:10
15. "Three Nights" (Rollins/Ginn) – 6:10
16. "Nothing Left Inside" (Rollins/Ginn) – 6:25
17. "Wound Up" (Rollins/Ginn) – 4:00
18. "Rat's Eyes" (Rollins/Ginn) – 4:21
19. "The Bars" (Rollins/Dukowski) – 4:38

== Personnel ==
Black Flag

- Henry Rollins – vocals
- Greg Ginn – guitar
- Kira Roessler – bass
- Bill Stevenson – drums

Additional performers

- Tom Troccoli – backing vocals
- "various audience members" – backing vocals
