= Toberman House =

Non-profit organization in California

Toberman Settlement House is a non-profit neighborhood center providing services to low-income residents of Los Angeles. Its efforts are aimed at helping individuals and families move from poverty to self-sufficiency. Founded in 1903 by Mayor James R. Toberman in honor of his son Homer Toberman who died of influenza in 1901, Toberman house is the oldest charity in the city of Los Angeles, and the oldest United Methodist mission project in the Western U.S. It was originally located in Echo Park, but moved to Boyle Heights in 1917, then San Pedro in 1937. Toberman House offers a wide range of social services, ranging from state-licensed K through 5 childcare, and afterschool care, to a senior's club.
