= Firehose (band) =

American alternative rock band

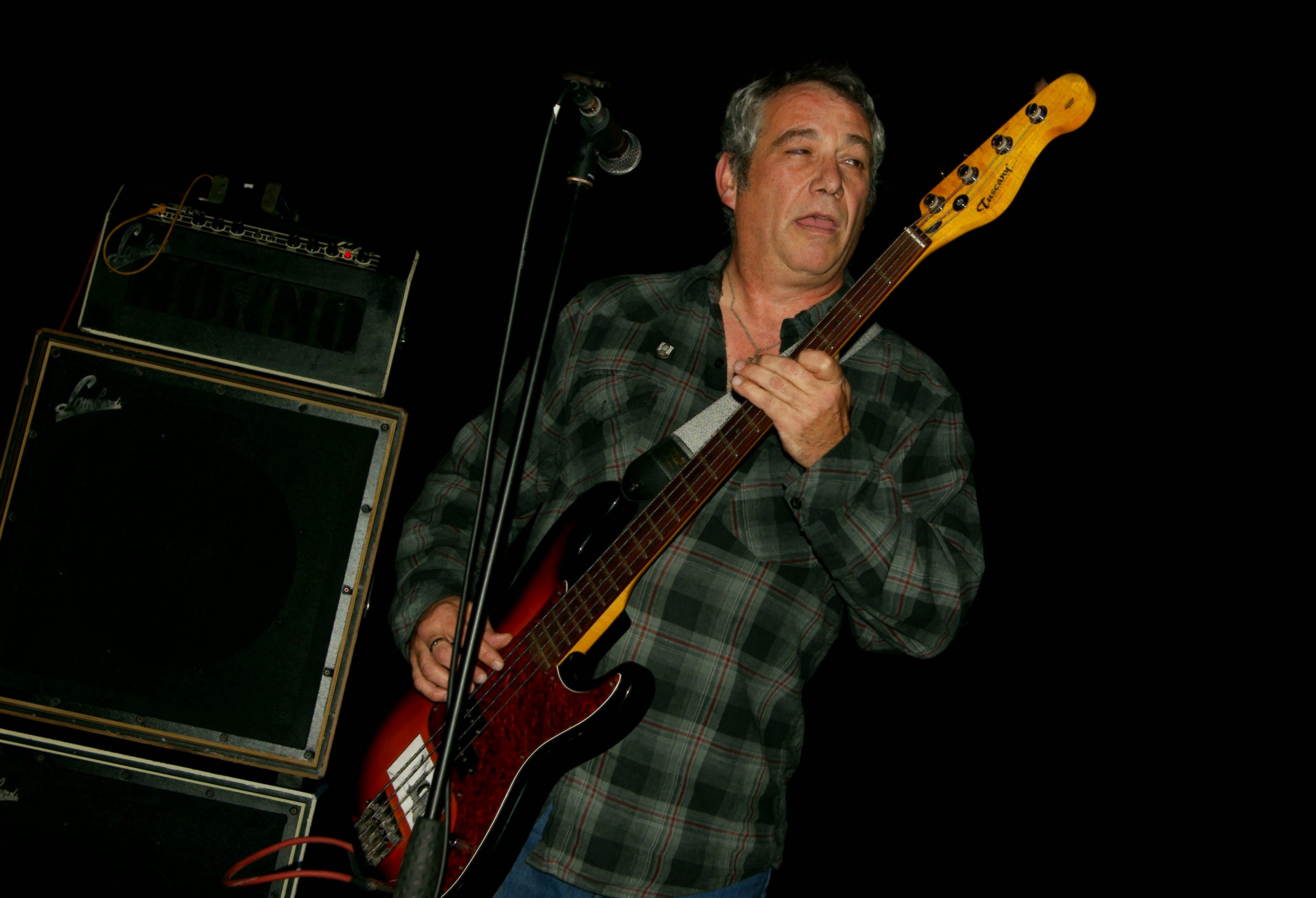
- Firehose's Mike Watt in 2013

Background information
- Origin: San Pedro, California, United States
- Genres: Alternative rock, post-punk, progressive punk, post-hardcore, punk jazz
- Years active: 1986–1994, 2012
- Labels: SST, Columbia
- Past members: Ed Crawford; Mike Watt; George Hurley

Firehose (stylized as fIREHOSE) was an American alternative rock band consisting of Mike Watt (bass, vocals), Ed Crawford (guitar, vocals), and George Hurley (drums). They were initially active from 1986 to 1994, and briefly reunited in 2012.

== History ==
Firehose was formed in the spring of 1986 shortly after D. Boon's accidental death brought an end to Watt and Hurley's previous band, Minutemen. Crawford, a then 21-year-old Ohio State student and Minutemen fan, was invited up on the roof of Camper Van Beethoven's van in Columbus, Ohio. Camper Van Beethoven's Victor Krummenacher told Crawford a rumor that Watt and Hurley were auditioning guitarists for the band. Crawford, having found Watt's phone number in the phone book, called him up and expressed his desire to come out to California and play with them. Still mourning the loss of his best friend Boon, Watt initially was not interested and had lost much of his desire to play music; however, Crawford's persistence eventually paid off when he showed up unannounced in San Pedro and asked Watt for the chance to come over and play for him. Watt eventually agreed and the two met with Crawford "auditioning" for Watt by playing him The Who's "I'm One," as well as a few Minutemen songs. Impressed with Crawford's passion and enthusiasm, Watt and Hurley agreed to give the inexperienced "kid" from Ohio a shot and the band was formed. Crawford quickly relocated to San Pedro where he became known as ed fROMOHIO and spent nine months sleeping under a desk in Watt's one-bedroom apartment. The name of the band was taken from Bob Dylan's short film doing "Subterranean Homesick Blues" as Watt thought it was funny when Dylan held up a cue card for the lyric that said "firehose". The name is stylized as "fIREHOSE" with a lowercase f as a subtle tribute to the Minutemen whose logo was an all caps MINUTEMEN.

The band played their first gig in June 1986 and by the end of the year released their debut album, Ragin', Full On via the independent label, SST. That same year, they also supported Sonic Youth on their "Flaming Telepaths Tour". The band quickly gained a loyal fanbase especially among the underground skateboarding crowd thanks in part to the inclusion of some of their early material in several key skateboarding videos from the late 1980s. "Brave Captain" from Ragin', Full On, as well as "Sometimes", "Hear Me", and "Windmilling" from their sophomore release, If'n were all featured in the Santa Cruz Skateboards video series, "Streets on Fire".

Over the course of seven and a half years, the band developed their own musical identity apart from Minutemen while still maintaining the same dynamic synthesis of punk, funk, and free jazz. They toured non-stop and consistently played to packed audiences. All in all, Firehose played 980 gigs, released five full-length albums and two EPs before disbanding in 1994. They played their final gig on February 12, 1994, at the Warner Grand Theatre in San Pedro, California.

In an interview with Billboard Watt declared "Most bands tour to promote records. We make records to promote tours."

== After Firehose (1994–2012) ==
Since disbanding, Mike Watt has released four solo albums and been involved in numerous musical projects including the longstanding bass duo, Dos (with ex-Black Flag bassist and ex-wife, Kira Roessler), FITTED (with Wire's Graham Lewis), Banyan (with Jane's Addiction drummer, Stephen Perkins), J Mascis + The Fog, The Stooges and Unknown Instructors (along with George Hurley). He also hosts The Watt from Pedro Show on Internet radio. Mike Watt, a San Pedro, Los Angeles, California resident since 1967, still resides there.

George Hurley has been involved in several musical projects and bands as well including Vida (with ex-Black Flag member, Dez Cadena), Red Krayola and Tripod (both with Tom Watson) and the Unknown Instructors. Like Watt, George Hurley also resides in San Pedro, Los Angeles, California.

Ed Crawford has also been involved in a handful of musical projects including fronting the North Carolina trio, Grand National (not to be confused with the UK band) and playing guitar and touring with the now defunct alt-country band, Whiskeytown. He currently resides in Pittsburgh, Pennsylvania, and fronts the alt/rock trio, FOOD.

== Reunion ==
It was announced in early 2012 that the band would be reuniting for their first live shows in over eighteen years. A compilation album chronicling their major label albums entitled lowFLOWS: The Columbia Anthology ('91–'93) was released to coincide with the reunion. The new album features Flyin' the Flannel, Live Totem Pole EP, Mr. Machinery Operator, as well as bonus material, including live cuts and instrumentals.

On January 4, 2012, Verbicide posted an article detailing that according to a reader's tip, an announcement was made at Harlow's in Sacramento, CA on December 29, 2011, that Firehose would be performing at the venue on April 5, 2012. Shortly after, Firehose were also confirmed as part of the line-up for the 2012 Coachella Valley Music and Arts Festival. in Indio, CA. A small West Coast tour christened "Smokin' on the Ol' Pink Pole" kicked off on April 5, 2012, at Harlow's and included 14 dates, among them two at the Coachella Valley Music and Arts Festival.

When asked whether Firehose was planning to make a new album, Mike Watt replied, "When Edward was asking me about doing new gigs, he also said he wanted to write... he has a band called Food, and said he's been writing songs. For these two weeks of gigs, we're just going to try and play some of the old ones. But he was talking about writing songs. So, I don't know – maybe down the road."

== Discography ==
=== Studio albums ===
- Ragin', Full On (1986, SST)
- If'n (1987, SST)
- Fromohio (1989, SST)
- Flyin' the Flannel (1991, Columbia Records)
- Mr. Machinery Operator (1993, Columbia Records)

=== EPs and singles ===
- Sometimes, Almost Always (EP, 1988, SST)
- "Time with You" (promo single, 1989, SST) No. 26 Billboard Modern Rock Tracks
- Live Totem Pole (EP, 1992, Columbia)
- "Big Bottom Pow Wow" (promo single, 1993, Columbia)
- "Red & Black" (live, single, 1995, Sony)

=== Compilations ===
- lowFLOWs: The Columbia Anthology ('91–'93) (2012)
