= Kira Roessler =

American musician

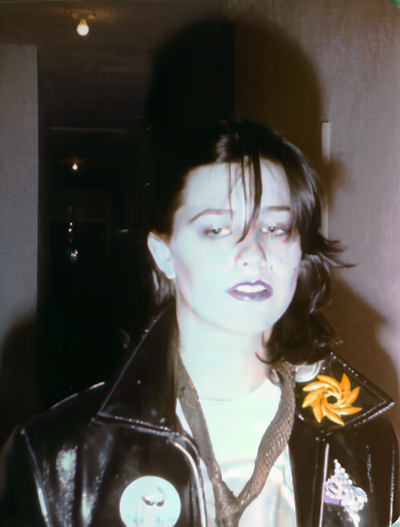
- Roessler before her time with Black Flag

Background information
- Born: June 12, 1961 (age 65); New Haven, Connecticut, U.S.
- Origin: Los Angeles, California
- Genres: Punk rock, hardcore punk, alternative rock
- Occupations: Musician, dialogue editor
- Instrument: Bass
- Years active: 1977–present
- Labels: SST, New Alliance, Kill Rock Stars
- Member of: Dos
- Formerly of: Black Flag
- Website: Dos' homepage at Mike Watt's Hoot Page

Kira Roessler (born June 12, 1961) is an American musician who was the bass guitarist for the influential hardcore punk band Black Flag from 1983 to 1985. Since the mid-1980s, she has been a member of the rock duo Dos with her now ex-husband Mike Watt.

Roessler also works as a dialogue editor. She was on the sound editing team for Mad Max: Fury Road, which won a 2015 Oscar. She was also on the teams that won Emmy Awards for the John Adams episode "Don't Tread on Me" and on the series Game of Thrones.

== Early life ==
Born in New Haven, Connecticut, Roessler lived there until age eight when her family moved to the Caribbean until she was eleven and thereafter in California, mostly in Los Angeles. Her brother is Paul Roessler, a keyboardist known for involvement in several Los Angeles–area bands including the Screamers.

== Career ==
=== Music ===
Roessler began studying piano when she was 6 but quit at 11. At 14, she picked up the bass guitar and committed to learning the instrument. Her first band was called Waxx and she played her first gig at 16 at Whisky a Go Go. Other early bands were Sexsick, the Visitors, and the Monsters. She then joined with a post-Germs Pat Smear to form Twisted Roots.

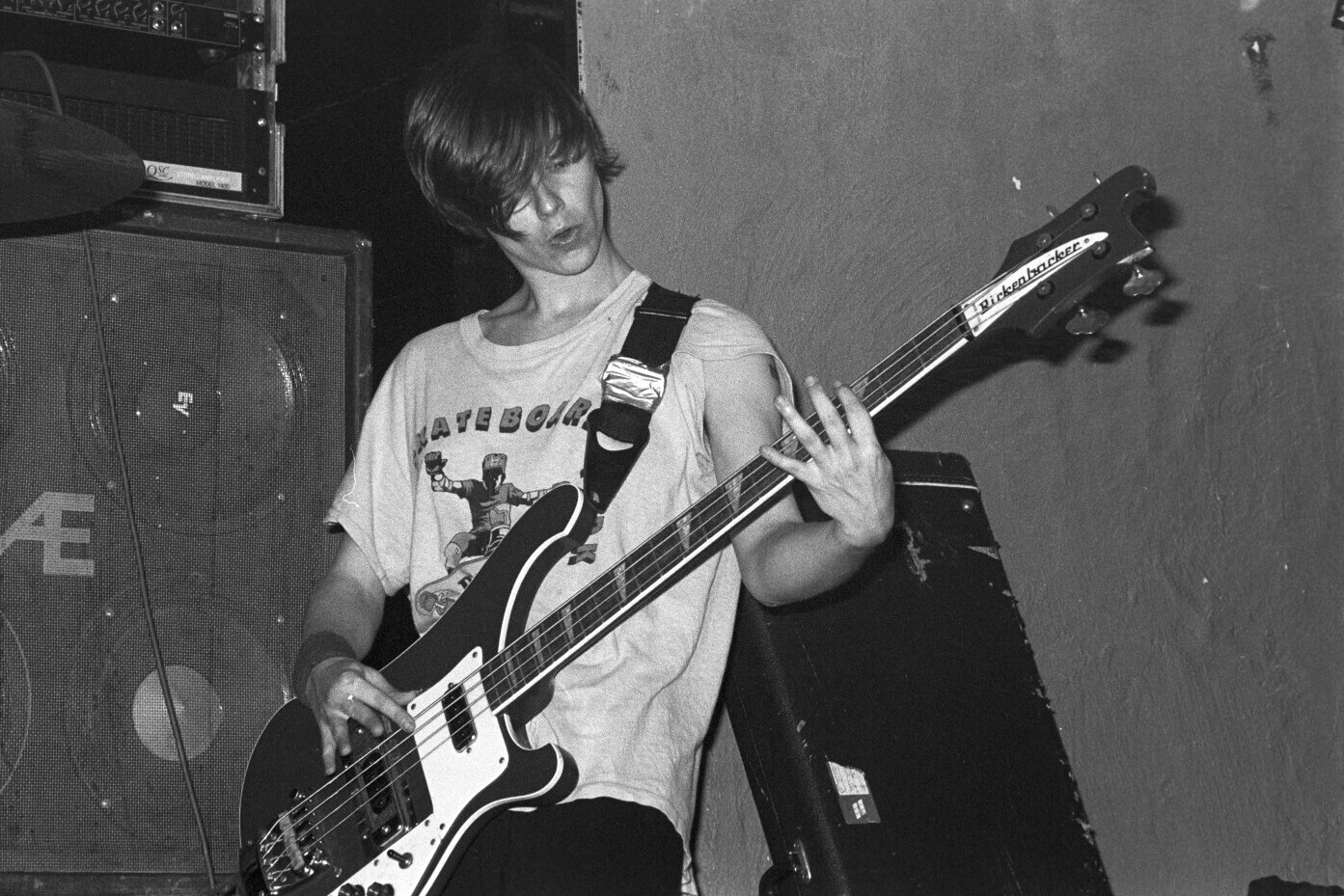
Roessler performing with Black Flag in 1984

Members of Black Flag heard her playing while she was sitting in with L.A. punk group DC3. This led to her being asked to join Black Flag in 1983 to replace founding member Chuck Dukowski. Vocalist Henry Rollins later reported that Greg Ginn, Black Flag's leader, guitarist and primary songwriter, had grown frustrated with Dukowski's failure to progress as a musician beyond the band's hardcore punk roots and was drawn to Roessler's more nimble and sophisticated playing. Roessler was majoring in applied engineering at UCLA, and Black Flag's subsequent tours were scheduled around her classes—a condition of her joining the band. Her bass playing was featured on five of Black Flag's studio albums and two officially released live albums. During her early live performances with the band she was sometimes mistaken as male due to her androgynous appearance, and she subsequently dressed in more feminine garb. She remained in the band until completing touring behind their album In My Head in the autumn of 1985. She graduated from UCLA in 1986.

After Black Flag, she formed the twin-bass duo Dos with Mike Watt (to whom she was married between 1987-1994). Dos' most recent album was released in 2011. She wrote or co-wrote songs for what would be the Minutemen's final album, 3-Way Tie, and contributed lyrics to Watt's post-Minutemen band Firehose. She later contributed artwork to Watt's first solo album, Ball-Hog or Tugboat?.

She appeared as a backing vocalist on the tribute album Rise Above: 24 Black Flag Songs to Benefit the West Memphis Three in 2003, along with other musical artists, including other Black Flag veterans.

In December 2018, Roessler joined with Devra Hoff to form the twin-bass band AwkWard and released their first album In Progress.

On August 13, 2021, on the Protonic Reversal podcast, Kira revealed that an album of solo material would be released on October 19 on Kitten Robot records.

=== Film work ===
Roessler works as a dialogue editor on theatrical films in Los Angeles, sometimes credited under her full name, sometimes simply as kira. She has worked on productions including Confessions of a Dangerous Mind (2002), Under the Tuscan Sun (2003), and The Twilight Saga: New Moon (2009), and has also appeared onscreen in the documentaries We Jam Econo: The Story of the Minutemen, American Hardcore and What Drives Us . She won Emmy Awards for her work on the John Adams episode "Don't Tread on Me" and on the series Game of Thrones.

Roessler was on the sound editing team for Mad Max: Fury Road, which won an Oscar in 2016.

== Discography ==
- KIRA (2021)

Twisted Roots (with Pat Smear)

- Pretentiawhat (1981)

Black Flag

- Family Man (1984)
- Slip It In (1984)
- Live '84 [Live] (1984)
- Loose Nut (1985)
- The Process of Weeding Out [EP] (1985)
- In My Head (1985)
- Who's Got the 10½? [Live] (1986)

dos (with Mike Watt)

- dos (1986)
- numero dos [EP] (1989)
- uno con dos (1989)
  - CD compiling the first two Dos releases
- justamente tres (1996)
- dos y dos (2011)

AwkWard (with Devra Hoff)

- In Progress (2018)

Other

- Minuteflag (1985)
- Rise Above: 24 Black Flag Songs to Benefit the West Memphis Three (2002)
- Gimmie Gimmie Gimmie: Reinterpreting Black Flag (2010)
- Enigma (2026)
