= Greg Ginn =

American musician

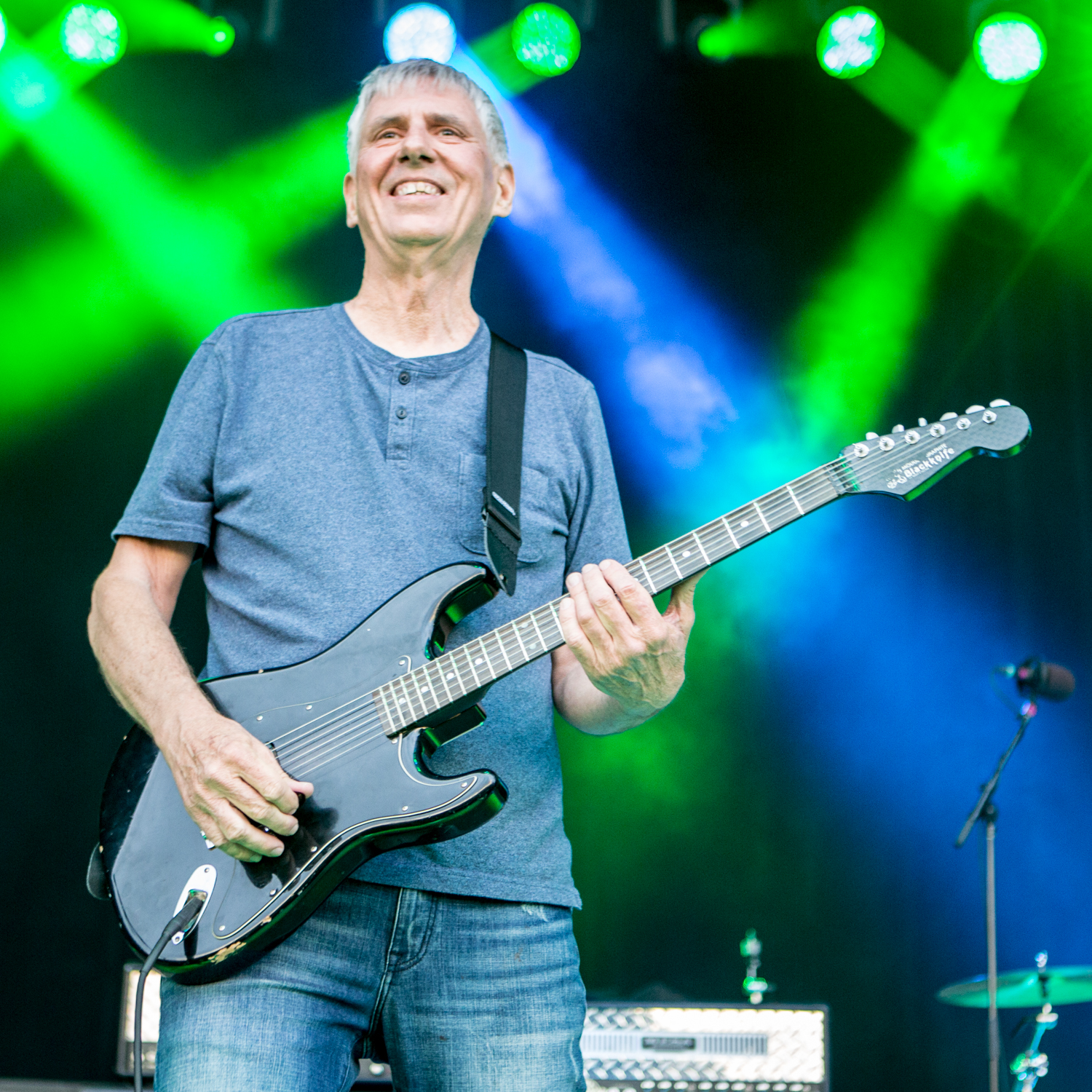
- Ginn performing in 2019

Background information
- Born: Gregory Regis Ginn; June 8, 1954 (age 72); Tucson, Arizona, U.S.
- Genres: Hardcore punk; punk rock; free jazz; punk jazz; sludge metal; heavy metal
- Occupations: Musician; songwriter; record producer
- Instruments: Guitar; bass; vocals; organ; theremin
- Years active: 1976–present
- Labels: SST; Cruz

Gregory Regis Ginn (/ˈɡɪn/ GHIN, born June 8, 1954) is an American musician and songwriter, best known for being the leader, primary songwriter, and the only continuous member of the hardcore punk band Black Flag, which he founded and led from 1976 to 1986, and again in 2003. Since the breakup of Black Flag, Ginn has recorded solo albums, and performed with such bands as October Faction, Gone, Confront James, Mojack, and others. He was 99th on Rolling Stone's list of "The 100 Greatest Guitarists of All Time."

== Early life ==
Ginn was born June 8, 1954, in Tucson, Arizona. As a child, Ginn moved to California, living first in Wasco, then settling in Hermosa Beach. He began an electronics company in Hermosa Beach, California, called Solid State Tuners, when he was 12 years old. He was also an amateur radio operator. Ginn became a vegetarian at 17 years old in 1971 and has been a vegan since 1998.

Ginn claims to have never genuinely enjoyed rock music during his youth, believing it to be "just trying to interject some kind of legitimacy into making three-minute commercials."

== Legacy ==
Many artists have cited Ginn as an influence or have expressed their admiration for him, including Melvins frontman Buzz Osborne, who also stated that he brought Kurt Cobain to his first punk show, a Black Flag show in 1984 where Kurt stated that he wanted that guitar sound for his band. Other musicians who have claimed him as an influence include: Omar Rodríguez-López of The Mars Volta, John Frusciante of Red Hot Chili Peppers, William DuVall of Alice in Chains, Ben Weinman of The Dillinger Escape Plan, Kurt Ballou of Converge, Justin Sane of Anti-Flag, RM Hubbert, Bill Kelliher of Mastodon, Zach Blair of Rise Against, Weasel Walter, Andrew Williams of Every Time I Die, Laurent Barnard of Gallows, and Nick Reinhart of Tera Melos.

== Personal life ==
Ginn is the older brother of artist Raymond Ginn, who goes by the pseudonym of Raymond Pettibon.

Ginn owns the Texas-based independent record label SST Records (SST), an outgrowth of his original Solid State Transmitters company.

=== Allegations of child abuse ===
On October 10, 2014, Ginn's ex-wife Marina filed a motion in court to prevent Ginn from having access to their two daughters, claiming Ginn was "routinely denying them food and threatening them," abusing alcohol and other substances while in their presence, had forced them to do cleaning chores until 2 a.m. despite the presence of numerous employees, "locked [them] in a room alone with no contact with the outside world through cell phone or emails," and had "throw[n] cups of water in their face." She also claimed he had told his daughters "you're hot" and "whistled at them," and told them "they are getting fat and need to lose weight and that their diets will have to be more strenuous." She also alleged that the children lived with Ginn in an industrial building that he was using for rehearsals as well as business dealings. She also alleged that their youngest daughter required hospitalization due to anxiety and stress. Her affidavit closed with: "Please grant me an emergency temporary orders hearing so my daughters don't have to live in fear." Former Black Flag member Ron Reyes subsequently testified in court in support of Marina Ginn's accusations.

Ginn stated that he retained custody of his children by order of the court. His lawyer vehemently denied the allegations. He told celebrity tabloid news website TMZ that "Marina has her own emotional issues -- including a porn past."

== Discography ==
=== Solo ===
- Getting Even LP (Cruz Records, 1993)
- Dick LP (Cruz Records, 1993)
- Payday EP (Cruz Records, 1993)
- Don't Tell Me EP (Cruz Records, 1994)
- Let It Burn (Because I Don't Live There Anymore) LP (Cruz Records, 1994)
- Bent Edge LP (SST Records, 2007) – with The Taylor Texas Corrugators
- Goof Off Experts LP (SST Records, 2008) – with The Taylor Texas Corrugators
- Freddie 7" (Electric Cowbell, 2010) – with The Taylor Texas Corrugators
- Legends of Williamson County LP (SST Records, 2010) – with The Taylor Texas Corrugators
- We Are Amused LP (SST Records, 2011) – with The Royal We
- We Are One 12" (SST Records, 2011) – with The Royal We
- Fearless Leaders LP (SST Records, 2013) – with The Royal We
- Gumbo And Holy Water LP (SST Records, 2014) – with The Taylor Texas Corrugators

=== Black Flag ===
- Nervous Breakdown EP (SST Records, 1979)
- Jealous Again EP (SST Records, 1980)
- Six Pack EP (SST Records, 1981)
- Louie, Louie single (Posh Boy Records, 1981)
- Damaged LP (SST Records/Unicorn Records, 1981)
- TV Party EP (SST Records/Unicorn Records, 1982)
- Everything Went Black double LP (SST Records, 1983)
- The First Four Years compilation cassette (SST Records, 1983)
- My War LP (SST Records, 1984)
- Family Man LP (SST Records, 1984)
- Slip It In LP (SST Records, 1984)
- Live '84 live cassette (SST Records, 1984)
- Loose Nut LP (SST Records, 1985)
- The Process of Weeding Out EP (SST Records, 1985)
- In My Head LP (SST Records, 1985)
- Who's Got the 10½? live LP (SST Records, 1986)
- Annihilate This Week live EP (SST Records, 1987)
- I Can See You EP (SST Records, 1989)
- What The... LP (SST Records, 2013)

=== Minutemen ===
- Paranoid Time EP (SST Records, 1980) (Producer)

=== SWA ===
- Your Future (If You Have One) LP (SST Records, 1985) (Producer)

=== October Faction ===
- October Faction live LP (SST Records, 1985)
- Second Factionalization LP (SST Records, 1986)

=== Tom Troccoli's Dog ===
- Tom Troccoli's Dog LP (SST Records, 1985)

=== Gone ===
- Let's Get Real, Real Gone for a Change LP (SST Records, 1986)
- Gone II – But Never Too Gone! LP (SST Records, 1986)
- Criminal Mind LP (SST Records, 1994)
- Smoking Gun remix EP (SST Records, 1994)
- All the Dirt That's Fit to Print LP (SST Records, 1994)
- Damage Control remix EP (SST Records, 1995)
- Best Left Unsaid LP (SST Records, 1996)
- Country Dumb LP (SST Records, 1998)
- The Epic Trilogy double CD (SST Records, 2007)

=== Minuteflag ===
- Minuteflag EP (SST Records, 1986)

=== Lawndale ===
- Sasquatch Rock LP (SST Records, 1987) (guest)

=== Rig ===
- Belly to the Ground LP (Cruz Records, 1994) (Producer, guest)

=== Mojack ===
- Merchandizing Murder CD (SST Records, 1995)
- Home Brew CD (SST Records, 1997)
- Rub-A-Dub CD (SST Records, 2003, unreleased)
- Under The Willow Tree CD (SST Records, 2007)
- The Metal Years CD (SST Records, 2008)
- Hijinks CD (SST Records, 2011)
- Car CD (SST Records, 2013)

=== Hor ===
- House CD (SST Records, 1995)
- Slo N' Sleazy CD (SST Records, 1996)
- A Faster, More Aggressive Hor CD (SST Records, 1998)
- Bash CD (SST Records, 2003, unreleased)
- Culture Wars CD (SST Records, 2010)
- Can't Make It Up CD (SST Records, 2014)

=== Confront James ===
- Test One Reality CD (SST Records, 1995)
- Just Do It CD (SST Records, 1995)
- Ill Gotten Hatred CD (SST Records, 1996)
- Chemical Exposure CD (SST Records, 1996)
- Black Mountain Bomb CD (SST Records, 1997)
- We Are Humored CD (SST Records, 2003, unreleased)

=== El Bad ===
- Bad Motherfucker CD (SST Records, 1996)
- Trick or Treat CD (SST Records, 1997)

=== Hotel X ===
- Uncommon Ground CD (SST Records, 1996) (guest)

=== Bias ===
- Model Citizen CD (SST Records, 1997)

=== Get Me High ===
- Taming the Underground CD (SST Records, 1997)

=== Killer Tweeker Bees ===
- Tweaker Blues CD (SST Records, 1997)

=== Fastgato ===
- Feral CD (SST Records, 2003, unreleased)

=== Limey LBC ===
- Life of Lime CD (SST Records, 2003, unreleased)

=== The Perfect Rat ===
- Endangered Languages CD (Alone Records, 2007)

=== Jambang ===
- Connecting CD (SST Records, 2008)
- 200 Days in Space DVD (SST Records, 2010)

=== Ten East ===
- Robot's Guide to Freedom CD (Lexicon Devil, 2008)

=== Libyan Hit Squad / Round Eye ===
- "Full Circle" EP (Ripping Records, 2010) (Guest)

=== Good for You ===
- Life Is Too Short Not to Hold a Grudge LP (SST Records, 2013)
- Too! LP (SST Records, 2013)
- Fucked Up "7"(SST Records, 2013)
- Full Serving (SST Records, 2013)
