= Ed Crawford =

American musician

Edward Crawford
- Born: Charles Edward Crawford; January 26, 1964 (age 62); Steubenville, Ohio, U.S.
- Genres: Alternative rock Indie rock
- Occupation: Musician
- Instruments: Vocals, guitar
- Years active: 1986–present
- Labels: SST, Columbia

Charles Edward Crawford (born January 26, 1964), known as ed fROMOHIO, is an American musician, best known as the lead singer and guitarist for Firehose, an alternative rock band he formed in 1986 with former Minutemen members Mike Watt (bass guitar) and George Hurley (drums).

== Biography ==
In 1985, Minutemen vocalist and guitarist D. Boon was killed in a van wreck. In 1986, Ed, a recent Ohio State University graduate and Minutemen fan, heard an erroneous rumor that Watt and Hurley were auditioning new guitarists from Victor Krummenacher of Camper Van Beethoven. Ed contacted Watt after obtaining his phone number at a show in Columbus, Ohio. Crawford called Watt and talked his way into visiting with Watt while visiting a friend in Southern California. Watt and Hurley were still very much grief-stricken over the death of their friend and bandmate, and exhibited little interest in starting a new band. While in California, Crawford pestered Watt to meet and play. As Crawford was about to return to Ohio, at the last minute, Watt accepted Ed's offer to jam. Shortly after, Watt offered Crawford a spot in a new band. Along with Hurley, they formed fIREHOSE. Shortly thereafter, the new band would record their first album, Ragin', Full On, and started touring. Eventually, he would record four more LPs with the band.

Crawford sang and played guitar with fIREHOSE until they broke up in 1994 after releasing five albums and touring extensively.

As of 2012, Crawford performed with a band called "Food" which is an acronym for "Far Out Old Dudes".

As of 2019, Crawford lived in Pittsburgh, Pennsylvania and played solo acoustic as well as electric gigs around town with his band, the Ed Crawford Trio. He appeared in the 2005 documentary film We Jam Econo. Since Firehose's break-up, he has also fronted the band Grand National (not to be confused with the UK band also named Grand National).

Crawford toured with several bands as a hired guitarist, including with the alt-country band Whiskeytown led by Ryan Adams, the Chapel Hill band Southern Culture on the Skids, and the Detroit band Mule. In August 2019, Crawford appeared on the "You Don't Know Mojack" podcast, where he spoke extensively about joining with Watt and Hurley to form fIREHOSE.

== See also ==
- Eddie from Ohio
