= All discography =

- All's logo, which appears on the covers of all their releases
- Studio albums: 9
- Extended plays: 1
- Live albums: 2
- Compilation albums: 1
- Singles: 6
- Music videos: 5
- Other appearances: 10

The discography of All, an American punk rock band, consists of nine studio albums, one compilation album, two live albums, one EP, six singles, and five music videos.

All formed in Los Angeles in 1987 following the departure of singer Milo Aukerman from the Descendents. The remaining Descendents members—guitarist Stephen Egerton, bassist Karl Alvarez, and drummer Bill Stevenson—decided to carry on as a band, adopting the title of the Descendents' last studio album, All, as their new name and recruiting singer Dave Smalley. They released the album Allroy Sez and EP Allroy for Prez in 1988 through Cruz Records, the former supported by a single for "Just Perfect". Smalley then left the band and was replaced by Scott Reynolds. Allroy's Revenge was released in 1989, with "She's My Ex" as the album's single. Two more albums followed in 1990: the live album Trailblazer and studio effort Allroy Saves. All also collaborated with former Descendents bassist Tony Lombardo on the album New Girl, Old Story (1991), credited to "TonyAll".

The band relocated to Brookfield, Missouri and issued 1992's Percolater, supported by a single for "Dot". It was their last album with Reynolds; he was replaced by Chad Price for 1993's Breaking Things, which was supported by the singles "Shreen" and "Guilty". All left Cruz Records in favor of major label Interscope and relocated to Fort Collins, Colorado, opening their own recording studio, The Blasting Room, where all subsequent All and Descendents albums have been recorded. Pummel was released in 1995, but the band was dissatisfied with Interscope and soon left the label.

Aukerman, who had contributed occasional songwriting and backing vocals to All since his departure from the Descendents, then decided to return to music. The members decided to operate simultaneously as two bands, performing with Aukerman as the Descendents and with Price as All. Both bands signed to Epitaph Records, with the Descendents releasing Everything Sucks in 1996 and All releasing Mass Nerder in 1998. They also launched their own label, Owned & Operated Recordings, through which they released the compilation album All in 1999, consisting of remixed versions of songs from their previous albums including contributions from all three All singers as well as Aukerman. 2000 saw the release of Problematic, followed in 2001 by Live Plus One, a double live album with one disc by All and the other by the Descendents. Live Plus One became All's only release to chart, reaching #45 on Billboard's Top Independent Albums chart. All has since performed occasional live dates but has not released any new recordings.

== Studio albums ==
Year	Album details
1988	Allroy Sez: Released: March 1988; Label: Cruz (CRZ-001); Formats: LP, CS, CD
1989	Allroy's Revenge: Released: 1989; Label: Cruz (CRZ-006); Formats: LP, CS, CD
1990	Allroy Saves: Released: 1990; Label: Cruz (CRZ-011); Formats: LP, CS, CD
1991	New Girl, Old Story^{[I]}: Released: 1991; Label: Cruz (CRZ-016); Formats: LP, CS, CD
1992	Percolater: Released: May 12, 1992; Label: Cruz (CRZ-022); Formats: LP, CS, CD
1993	Breaking Things: Released: 1993; Label: Cruz (CRZ-031); Formats: LP, CS, CD
1995	Pummel: Released: 1995; Label: Interscope (INTD-92528); Formats: LP, CD
1998	Mass Nerder: Released: May 5, 1998; Label: Epitaph (E-86531); Formats: LP, CD
2000	Problematic: Released: June 6, 2000; Label: Epitaph (E-86585); Formats: CD

I New Girl, Old Story is a collaboration between All and original Descendents bassist Tony Lombardo, and is credited to "TonyAll".

== Live albums ==
Year	Album details	Peak chart positions
Year	Album details	US
Year	Album details	Independent
1990	Trailblazer: Released: 1990; Label: Cruz (CRZ-010); Format: LP, CS, CD	—
2001	Live Plus One: Released: August 21, 2001; Label: Epitaph (E-86618); Format: CD	45
"—" denotes releases that did not chart.

== Compilation albums ==
Year	Album details
1999	All: Released: February 23, 1999; Label: Owned & Operated (O&O-007); Format: CD

== EPs ==
Year	Album details
1988	Allroy for Prez: Released: 1988; Label: Cruz (CRZ-004); Format: EP, CS, CD

== Singles ==
Year	Single	Album
1988	"Just Perfect"	Allroy Sez
1989	"She's My Ex"	Allroy's Revenge
1991	"Just Like Them"	Allroy Saves
1992	"Dot"	Percolater
1993	"Shreen"	Breaking Things
1994	"Guilty"	Breaking Things
1997	"Ruby"^{[I]}	—
"—" denotes singles that are not from albums.

I "Ruby" is a split release with the band Judge Nothing and is a cover version of "Ruby, Don't Take Your Love to Town", originally performed by Johnny Darrell.

== Music videos ==
Year	Song	Director	Album
1990	"Simple Things"		Allroy Saves
1992	"Dot"	Thomas Mignone	Percolater
1994	"Shreen"		Breaking Things
1995	"Million Bucks"	Samuel Bayer	Pummel
1998	"World's on Heroin"		Mass Nerder

== Other appearances ==
The following All songs were released on compilation albums, soundtracks, and other releases. This is not an exhaustive list; songs that were first released on the band's albums, EPs, or singles are not included.

Year	Release details	Track(s)
1990	Hard to Believe: A Kiss Covers Compilation: Released: 1990; Label: C/Z (CZ-024); Format: CD	"Christine Sixteen" (originally performed by Kiss)
1998	The Show soundtrack: Released: January 14, 1998; Label: Theologian (T-67); Format: CD	"Silence" (demo)
1998	The New Frontier: A Collection of Colorado Punk Bands: Released: 1998; Label: Soda Jerk (SJR-010); Format: CD	"All in All"
1999	Short Music for Short People: Released: June 1, 1999; Label: Fat Wreck Chords (FAT-591); Format: CD	"I Got None"
1999	Before You Were Punk 2: Released: August 24, 1999; Label: Vagrant (VR-399); Format: CD	"Rebel Yell" (originally performed by Billy Idol)
2000	Live at the Starlight: Released: May 16, 2000; Label: Owned & Operated (O&O-014); Format: CD, 7"	"Educated Idiot" (live)
2000	Punk-O-Rama #5: Released: June 20, 2000; Label: Epitaph (E-86588); Format: CD	"Problematic"
2000	The Blasting Room: Released: 2000; Label: Owned & Operated (O&O-008); Format: CD	"Insensitive"
2000	Disarming Violence: Released: 2000; Label: Fastmusic (FAST-7010); Format: CD	"College Town"
2002	Dive into Disney: Released: October 30, 2002; Label: Avex group / Walt Disney (AVCW-12304); Format: CD	"Chim Chim Cher-ee" (originally performed by Julie Andrews and Dick Van Dyke)
