= All (All album) =

- The album's cover depicts the band's Allroy character dissecting a musical note.

Compilation album by All
- Released: February 23, 1999
- Genre: Punk rock
- Length: 54:13
- Label: Owned & Operated (O&O-007)

All chronology
Mass Nerder (1998)	All (1999)	Problematic (2000)

Professional ratings
Review scores
Source	Rating
Allmusic	4/5 stars

All is a compilation album by the punk rock band All. It was released on February 23, 1999, on All's own label, Owned & Operated.

The album includes remastered songs picked by the fans, a previously unavailable track by Milo Aukerman, and an extensive booklet with lyrics, photos, and a complex family tree of All and the Descendents.

Since this album was self-released, a limited number of copies were pressed. Because of this, it is harder to find on the secondary market than other All CDs.

== Track listing ==
No.	Title	Writer(s)	Lead vocals	Length
1.	"Crazy?" (from "She's My Ex", 1989)	Karl Alvarez	Scott Reynolds	1:45
2.	"Million Bucks" (from Pummel, 1995)	Bill Stevenson (music and lyrics), Alvarez (music)	Chad Price	2:05
3.	"Skin Deep" (from Allroy for Prez, 1988)	Alvarez	Dave Smalley	1:59
4.	"She's My Ex" (from Allroy's Revenge, 1989)	Stevenson	Reynolds	3:14
5.	"Right" (from Breaking Things, 1993)	Alvarez	Price	1:54
6.	"Scary Sad" (from Allroy's Revenge, 1989)	Stevenson	Reynolds	2:47
7.	"Postage" (from Allroy for Prez, 1988)	Stevenson	Smalley	2:09
8.	"Shreen" (from Breaking Things, 1993)	Stevenson	Price	2:38
9.	"Frog" (from Allroy Saves, 1990)	Reynolds	Reynolds	2:11
10.	"Original Me" (from Breaking Things, 1993)	Price	Price	2:44
11.	"Simple Things" (from Allroy Saves, 1990)	Stevenson	Reynolds	3:19
12.	"Pretty Little Girl" (from Allroy Sez, 1988)	Alvarez	Smalley	1:56
13.	"Nothin'" (from Percolater, 1992)	Alvarez	Reynolds	1:56
14.	"Breakin' Up" (from Pummel, 1995)	Stevenson	Price	2:44
15.	"Minute" (from Percolater, 1992)	Stevenson	Reynolds	1:26
16.	"Just Like Them" (previously unreleased version)	Milo Aukerman	Aukerman	3:48
17.	"Dot" (from Percolater, 1992)	Reynolds	Reynolds	1:58
18.	"Long Distance" (from Pummel, 1995)	Stevenson	Price	3:03
19.	"Mary" (from Allroy's Revenge, 1989)	Reynolds	Reynolds	3:20
20.	"Self-Righteous" (from Pummel, 1995)	Alvarez	Price	1:37
21.	"Just Perfect" (from Allroy Sez, 1988)	Stevenson	Smalley	2:58
22.	"Educated Idiot" (from Allroy Saves, 1990)	Alvarez	Reynolds	2:42

== Credits ==
- Bill Stevenson – Drums
- Karl Alvarez – Bass, vocals
- Stephen Egerton – Guitar
- Chad Price – Vocals on tracks 2, 5, 8, 10, 14, 18 and 20
- Scott Reynolds – Vocals on tracks 1, 4, 6, 9, 11, 13, 15, 17, 19 and 22
- Dave Smalley – Vocals on tracks 3, 7, 12 and 21
- Milo Aukerman – Vocals on track 16
