= Allroy Saves =

- The album's cover depicts the band's Allroy character crucified to a fence.

Studio album by All
- Released: August 1990
- Recorded: March 1990
- Studio: Third Wave Recording, Torrance, California
- Genre: Punk rock; pop punk
- Length: 34:44
- Label: Cruz (CRZ-011)
- Producer: Bill Stevenson, Stephen Egerton

All chronology
Trailblazer (1990)	Allroy Saves (1990)	New Girl, Old Story (1991)

Professional ratings
Review scores
Source	Rating
Allmusic	2.5/5 stars

Allroy Saves is the third studio album by the American punk rock band All, released in 1990 through Cruz Records. It was the first album that the band members recorded, mixed, and produced entirely on their own. A music video, the band's first, was released for the song "Simple Things".

Along with New Girl, Old Story, which was recorded at the same time, Allroy Saves was All's last album recorded in Los Angeles, the band's place of origin; the members relocated to Brookfield, Missouri following the album's recording. It was also their last album to be titled after their mascot, Allroy, who had been depicted on their album covers since 1988; Allroy would be absent from their albums for much of the 1990s until being brought back for 1998's Mass Nerder.

== Writing ==
As with their prior records, all four band members contributed to the songwriting of Allroy Saves. Additionally, the band's longtime roadie Daniel "Bug" Snow wrote the lyrics to the 11-second "Freaky". Milo Aukerman, of All's precursor band the Descendents, contributed "Just Like Them", a song he had written in 1988 for his band Milestone. An alternate recording of the song, with Aukerman singing lead vocals, was later released on the band's 1999 compilation album All. Stevenson described the songs on Allroy Saves as being "definitely more in the Allroy's Revenge or the Descendents' All side of things, and not the Allroy Sez and the I Don't Want to Grow Up side of things. Like more integrated melodies and integrated guitar, less of a direct pop."

== Recording ==
The album was recorded in March 1990 at Third Wave Recording in Torrance, California, where All had worked on all of their previous releases. Backing vocals were performed by Joe Nolte of The Last and by Sarina Matteucci, drummer Bill Stevenson's girlfriend of several years who sold the band's merchandise through mail order and while on tour.

The Descendents and All had worked with recording engineer Richard Andrews since 1986, and over time the band members had become increasingly involved in the studio process: Stevenson had produced all of their releases since 1985, guitarist Stephen Egerton had served as an assistant engineer on their releases since 1988, and the two had mixed and produced All's live album Trailblazer together. Bassist Karl Alvarez later remarked that "As things moved on, the production stuff really started becoming important, because in music you either produce yourself or you're at the mercy of producers." Stevenson and Egerton decided to record and produce Allroy Saves themselves, without Andrews: "Richard was an excellent engineer," recalled Egerton, "and Bill and I learned an incredible amount from him. We decided at a certain point that we wanted to head out and try it ourselves and see what happened, so Bill and I did the Allroy Saves record, just the two of us, and it was a catastrophic nightmare, sonically speaking." Andrews understood the need for the band to take on more of their own recording duties: "That was their lives. It was all they had. All they had was the van, the band, and the studio when it was time to record, and that's it, so they had to get into it."

== Title and cover art ==
Allroy Saves was All's last album to be titled after their mascot, Allroy. The character, created and illustrated by Alvarez, had appeared on the covers of Allroy Sez (1988), Allroy for Prez (1988), and Allroy's Revenge (1989). For Allroy Saves Alvarez drew Allroy crucified to a fence, his eyes crossed out, tongue hanging out, and skin color changed from its usual yellow to green. Allroy would be absent from the band's following albums Percolater (1992), Breaking Things (1993), and Pummel (1995), but would be revived for Mass Nerder (1998), All (1999), and Problematic (2000). Egerton did the graphics for Allroy Saves.

== Release and relocation ==
Allroy Saves was released in August 1990 through Cruz Records in LP, cassette, and CD formats. A music video, the band's first, was released for the song "Simple Things".

Along with New Girl, Old Story, a collaborative album with original Descendents bassist Tony Lombardo recorded the same month, Allroy Saves was All's last release to be recorded in California. Seeking a more affordable cost of living and centralized location from which to tour, All relocated to Brookfield, Missouri following the recording sessions. Their following album, 1992's Percolator, was recorded at studios in Kansas City, Missouri and Nashville, Tennessee, while 1993's Breaking Things was recorded at Ardent Studios in Memphis, Tennessee. The band subsequently relocated to Fort Collins, Colorado and opened their own recording studio, The Blasting Room, where all their subsequent albums have been recorded.

== Reception ==
Alex Henderson of Allmusic gave Allroy Saves two and a half stars out of five, remarking that it "has its moments but could have been much stronger. Some of the songs are fun and catchy enough, most notably 'Just Like Them', 'Educated Idiot', and the goofy 'Frog'. But most of the material is disposable, and when you look at the CD on the whole, you realize how unfocused and generally disappointing it is. Allroy Saves is an album that only completists will find of interest."

== Track listing ==
No.	Title	Writer(s)	Length
1.	"Educated Idiot"	Karl Alvarez	2:42
2.	"Just Like Them"	Milo Aukerman	4:11
3.	"Prison"	Scott Reynolds	3:03
4.	"Just Living"	Bill Stevenson, Reynolds (lyrics); Stephen Egerton (music)	4:26
5.	"Freaky"	Daniel Snow (lyrics); Alvarez, Egerton, Reynolds, Stevenson (music)	0:11
6.	"Frog"	Reynolds	2:12
7.	"Simple Things"	Stevenson	3:21
8.	"Cyclops"	Reynolds	2:06
9.	"Ratchet"	Reynolds	3:59
10.	"Sum"	Alvarez	2:44
11.	"Crawdad"	Reynolds	1:39
12.	"Explorador"	Stevenson	4:04

== Personnel ==
Band

- Karl Alvarez – bass guitar, cover artwork
- Stephen Egerton – guitar, engineer, producer, graphics
- Scott Reynolds – vocals
- Bill Stevenson – drums, backing vocals, engineer, producer

Additional performers

- Sarina Matteucci – backing vocals
- Joe Nolte – backing vocals

Production

- Eric Colvin – studio assistance
- Adrian Cook – additional assistance
- Bill Cook – additional assistance
