= She's My Ex =

Single by All

from the album Allroy's Revenge
- B-side: "Crazy?"
- Released: 1989
- Recorded: December 1988
- Studio: Third Wave Recording, Torrance, California
- Genre: Pop-punk
- Length: 4:52
- Label: Cruz
- Songwriter: Bill Stevenson
- Producer: Bill Stevenson

All singles chronology
"Just Perfect" (1988)	"She's My Ex" (1989)	"Dot" (1992)

Audio sample
- file; help

"She's My Ex" is a song by the American punk rock band All, released as a single from their 1989 album Allroy's Revenge. Written by drummer Bill Stevenson, the song describes an ex-girlfriend with whom he had a tumultuous romance. The B-side track "Crazy?", written by bassist Karl Alvarez, is from the Allroy's Revenge recording sessions but was not included on the album.

== Background ==
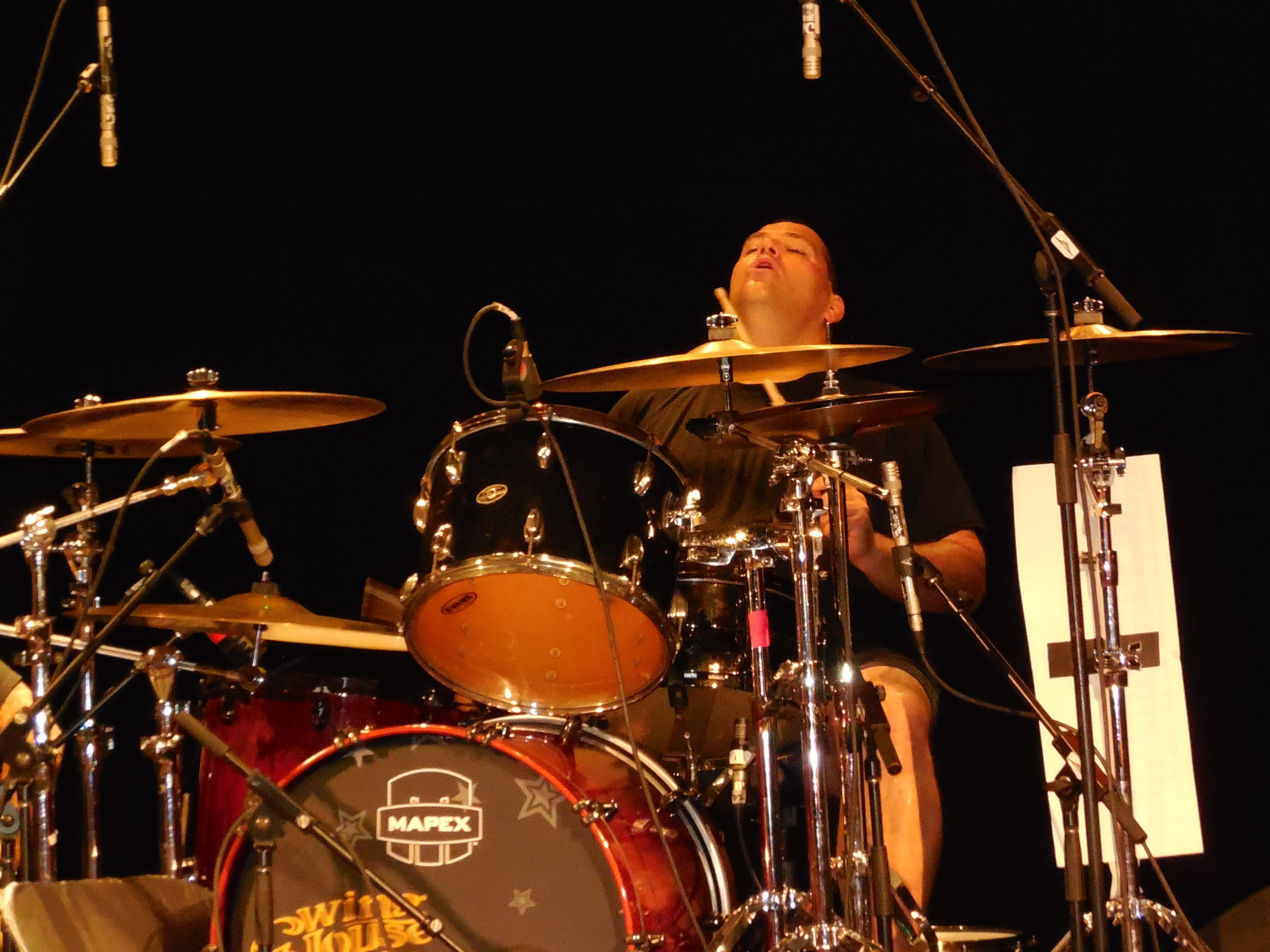
Drummer Bill Stevenson wrote "She's My Ex" about a difficult relationship.

Several of Stevenson's songs on Allroy's Revenge describe a tumultuous romance, including "Scary Sad", "She's My Ex", and "Net". The songs were written about an ex-girlfriend of Stevenson's who had problems with drugs and was placed on probation. "She's My Ex" describes how he "can't expect she'll change her ways, can't accept the things she done / She's just my ex / Nothing more, nothing less / She'll always be my ex". Recording engineer Richard Andrews remarked that "It seems like on every album, Bill would have the song that he knew was gonna bring people to the band and bring people to the record, and 'She's My Ex' was one of them."

"She's My Ex" was recorded with the rest of Allroy's Revenge in December 1988 at Third Wave Recording in Torrance, California, with Stevenson as record producer. It was singer Scott Reynolds' first recording session with All, and recording "She's My Ex" taught him how meticulous Stevenson could be during the recording process. "That was where Scott got his first taste of how absolutely particular Bill was", remembered guitarist Stephen Egerton. Reynolds later recalled:

I've never been in a band where phrasing was so fucking important as this band. Karl would do some of that too. Not as bad as Bill. Oh god, Bill, he'd just stop the tape, and it's terrible because you're going "She'll always be..." and then all of a sudden the tape stops, and you're like "What?" and he's like "You’re flat", and he goes back. So we got all done with this thing after days on one song, and he goes "That’s awesome. We're done", and I'm like "Phew!" and he goes "Okay, let's double it."

"Crazy?", written by Alvarez, was also recorded during the Allroy's Revenge sessions but was left off of the album. Several performers sang backing vocals on the track, including Milo Aukerman of All's precursor band the Descendents.

"She's My Ex" was released through Cruz Records in 1989 as a 10-inch and 12-inch single, cassette single, and CD single. Ilisa Katz provided the cover photograph, while Alvarez and Reynolds drew the illustrations for the back cover. Live recordings of "She's My Ex" were later released on All's live albums Trailblazer (1990) and Live Plus One (2001), the latter sung by Reynolds' successor Chad Price. The studio versions of "She's My Ex" and "Crazy?" were later remixed by Stevenson, Egerton, and Jason Livermore for All's best-of compilation album All (1999).

== Track listing ==
Side A
No.	Title	Writer(s)	Length
1.	"She's My Ex"	Bill Stevenson	3:07

Side B
No.	Title	Writer(s)	Length
2.	"Crazy?"	Karl Alvarez	1:45
Total length:			4:52

== Personnel ==
Band

- Karl Alvarez – bass guitar, cover illustrations
- Stephen Egerton – guitar, assistant engineer
- Scott Reynolds – lead vocals
- Bill Stevenson – drums, producer, additional engineer

Additional performers

- Milo Aukerman – backing vocals on "Crazy?"
- Bub – backing vocals on "Crazy?"
- Chris – backing vocals on "Crazy?"
- Jovi – backing vocals on "Crazy?"
- Sarina Matteucci – backing vocals on "Crazy?"
- Ward – backing vocals on "Crazy?"

Production

- Richard Andrews – engineer
- James B. Mansfield – additional engineer
- Ilisa Katz – front cover photograph
