= Just Perfect =

- Left to right on the cover: Stephen Egerton, Dave Smalley, Karl Alvarez, and Bill Stevenson having sand poured on them by a loader.

Single by All

from the album Allroy Sez
- B-side: "Wishing Well"
- Released: 1988
- Recorded: November–December 1987 at Third Wave Recording, Torrance, California
- Genre: Punk rock
- Length: 5:58
- Label: Cruz (CRZ-003)
- Songwriter: Bill Stevenson
- Producers: Bill Stevenson, Richard Andrews

All singles chronology
"Just Perfect" (1988)	"She's My Ex" (1989)

Audio sample
- file; help

"Just Perfect" is a song by the American punk rock band All, released as a single from their 1988 debut album Allroy Sez. Written by drummer Bill Stevenson, "Just Perfect" was remixed from the original album version for release as a single. The B-side track "Wishing Well", written by singer Dave Smalley, is from the Allroy Sez recording sessions but was not included on the album. Both tracks were later included on the compact disc release of All's following EP, Allroy for Prez (1988).

== Recording ==
Both songs on the single were recorded during the Allroy Sez sessions in November and December 1987 at Third Wave Recording in Torrance, California, with Stevenson and Richard Andrews acting as record producers. Smalley later recalled that Stevenson was demanding and meticulous in the recording of "Just Perfect":

I had to sing "Just Perfect" for like four hours in the studio until he got the take he wanted. I said "Dude, I’m really hungry. Let’s take a little break and I’ll come back to it." He comes back with this big Snickers bar, tapes it to the other side of the glass and says "When you’re done you can have it!" I’m like "Oh my god, are you fucking kidding me? Alright, fucking push play."

A live recording of "Just Perfect" was later released on All's 1990 live album Trailblazer, sung by Smalley's successor Scott Reynolds. The studio version of "Just Perfect" was later remixed by Stevenson, Egerton, and Jason Livermore for All's best-of compilation album All (1999).

== Reception ==
Reviewing the single, critic Jack Rabid called "Just Perfect" the best song from Allroy Sez and compared it to the band's previous work as the Descendents (the Descendents had changed their name to All when singer Milo Aukerman left the band in 1987): "Even without Milo, they seem legit if they can keep pouring out tunes as special as this one that compare favorably with their older incarnation/name's terrific body of work going back almost a decade."

== Track listing ==
Side A
No.	Title	Writer(s)	Length
1.	"Just Perfect" (remix)	Bill Stevenson	2:58

Side B
No.	Title	Writer(s)	Length
1.	"Wishing Well"	Dave Smalley	3:00
Total length:			5:58

== Personnel ==
Band

- Karl Alvarez – bass guitar, back cover drawing
- Stephen Egerton – guitar
- Dave Smalley – vocals
- Bill Stevenson – drums, producer

Production

- Richard Andrews – producer
- Matt Rector – cover photograph
