= New Girl, Old Story =

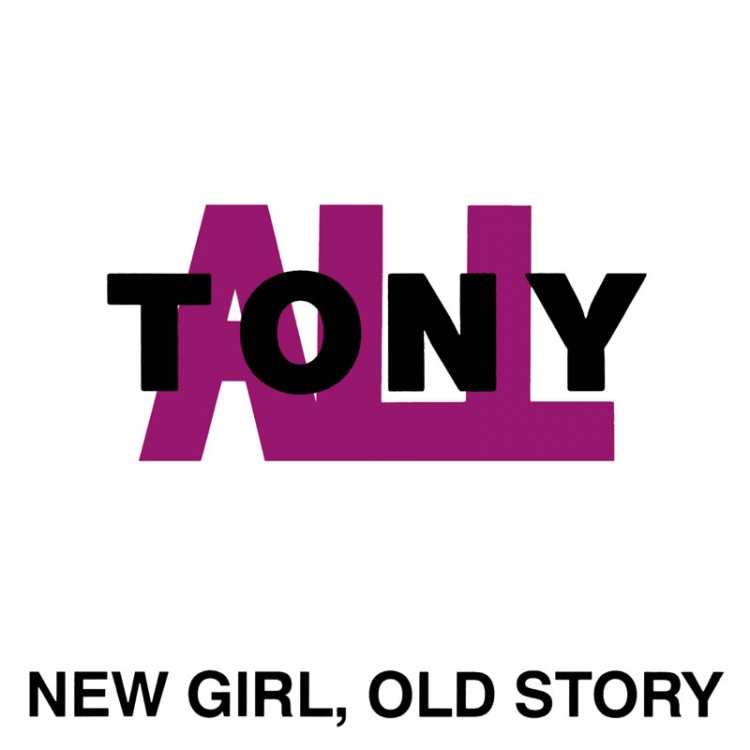

Studio album by All with Tony Lombardo
- Released: August 6, 1991
- Recorded: March 1990
- Studio: Third Wave Recording, Torrance, California; Westbeach Recorders, Hollywood
- Genre: Punk rock
- Length: 40:37
- Label: Cruz (CRZ-016)
- Producer: Bill Stevenson, Stephen Egerton

All chronology
Allroy Saves (1990)	New Girl, Old Story (1991)	Percolater (1992)

New Girl, Old Story is collaborative album between the American punk rock band All and Tony Lombardo, the original bassist of All's precursor band the Descendents. Credited to "TonyAll", it consists of twelve songs written by Lombardo between 1979 and 1989. Lombardo played bass guitar on the entire album, with the members of All playing the rest of the instrumentation. Vocals were split between Lombardo and All singer Scott Reynolds, with All bassist Karl Alvarez also singing one song. Along with their 1990 album Allroy Saves, recorded at the same time, New Girl, Old Story was the last album recorded by All before their relocation from Los Angeles to Brookfield, Missouri.

== Background ==
Lombardo was the original bassist in the Descendents, joining founding members Frank Navetta and Bill Stevenson in 1979 while the group was still in its formative stages. He played on the band's debut single "Ride the Wild" / "It's a Hectic World" (1979), the Fat EP (1981), and the albums Milo Goes to College (1982) and I Don't Want to Grow Up (1985), but left the group in 1985 because he did not want to go on tour. The Descendents experienced several lineup changes and in 1987, when singer Milo Aukerman left the band to attend graduate school, the remaining members—Stevenson, bassist Karl Alvarez, and guitarist Stephen Egerton—relaunched the band as All with singer Dave Smalley. Lombardo, meanwhile, performed with singer Scott Reynolds in the bands Boxer Rebellion, Nuclear Bob, and Three Care Pileup. Reynolds replaced Smalley as All's singer in 1988, and Lombardo contributed two songs to Reynolds' first album with the band, Allroy's Revenge (1989), "Man-O-Steel" and the instrumental "Gnutheme".

== Recording ==
According to Lombardo, the idea to record an album with All was Stevenson's: "Bill owed me some money, and I think he suggested that he would record an album for me in lieu of paying me some money at that particular point in time. I thought it was a great idea." The songs were ones Lombardo had written and arranged between 1979 and 1989. "They were songs of a different nature", he later recalled. According to Stevenson, some of the songs dealt with a relationship Lombardo had been in with a younger woman:

"Special to Me" is one of my all time favorite songs of Tony's. He was so sad about all that with his younger girlfriend, and I swear nothing has ever been more heartfelt. I get teary just thinking about it. It's so positive and so negative. When it goes into "I love you, even though I know, too [that our love is taboo]", it's like the saddest thing I've ever heard. But there really was a tremendous age difference.

The album was recorded in March 1990 at Third Wave Recording in Torrance, California and Westbeach Recorders in Hollywood. Stevenson and Egerton produced and engineered the recording, with additional engineering at Westbeach done by Donnell Cameron. Lombardo played bass guitar on the entire record and sang on five of its twelve tracks. Reynolds sang on five tracks, while Alvarez sang "Guitar Case" (the remaining track, "Son-O-Theme", is an instrumental). "We got Karl to sing, Scott sang", Lombardo later remembered. "I sang, if you want to call it singing. My voice is very shaky, iffy."

Along with their third studio album Allroy Saves (1990), recorded the same month, New Girl, Old Story was All's last release to be recorded in California. Seeking a more affordable cost of living and centralized location from which to tour, the band relocated to Brookfield, Missouri following the recording sessions.

== Release ==
New Girl, Old Story was released August 6, 1991, through Cruz Records in LP, cassette, and CD formats under the band name "TonyAll". With All having moved to Missouri, there were no live shows or touring to support the album, though Lombardo made an attempt to get local radio airplay: "I actually sent one song to KROQ under the band name Larger Than Life. Oh, what a joke. I thought it was pretty good. It was fun. I don’t regret anything. Those were pretty good songs."

== Track listing ==
All tracks are written by Tony Lombardo.

No.	Title	Lead vocals	Length
1.	"Son-O-Theme"	instrumental	1:43
2.	"Telltale Signs"	Scott Reynolds	2:44
3.	"This Is Not a Dream"	Reynolds	4:10
4.	"U R Super"	Lombardo	3:28
5.	"Keep It"	Lombardo	6:00
6.	"Casual Girl"	Reynolds	1:26
7.	"New Girl, Old Story"	Reynolds	3:31
8.	"Face 2 Face"	Lombardo	4:48
9.	"Last Refuge"	Lombardo	3:49
10.	"At the Party"	Reynolds	2:15
11.	"Guitar Case"	Karl Alvarez	3:25
12.	"Special to Me"	Lombardo	3:12

== Personnel ==
Band

- Karl Alvarez – vocals on "Guitar Case"
- Stephen Egerton – guitar, engineer, producer
- Tony Lombardo – bass guitar; vocals on "U R Super", "Keep It", "Face 2 Face", "Last Refuge", and "Special to Me"
- Scott Reynolds – vocals on "Telltale Signs", "This Is Not a Dream", "Casual Girl", "New Girl, Old Story", and "At the Party"
- Bill Stevenson – drums, engineer, producer

Production

- Donnell Cameron – additional engineering
