= Scott Reynolds =

Scott Reynolds may refer to:

- Scott Reynolds (singer), punk rock vocalist with the band All from 1989-1993
- Scott Reynolds (writer), television writer
