= Trailblazer (album) =

- The album's title and cover art refer to a brand of portable toilet used by the band while on tour.

Live album by All
- Released: 1990
- Recorded: July 18, 1989
- Venue: CBGB, New York City
- Studio: Third Wave Recording, Torrance, California
- Genre: Hardcore punk
- Length: 30:42
- Label: Cruz (CRZ-010)
- Producer: Bill Stevenson, Stephen Egerton

All chronology
Allroy's Revenge (1989)	Trailblazer (1990)	Allroy Saves (1990)

Trailblazer is a live album by the American punk rock band All, released in 1990 through Cruz Records. It was recorded in July 1989 at CBGB in New York City during the band's tour to promote their second studio album, Allroy's Revenge. The album was titled after a brand of portable toilet used by the band while on tour.

== Recording ==
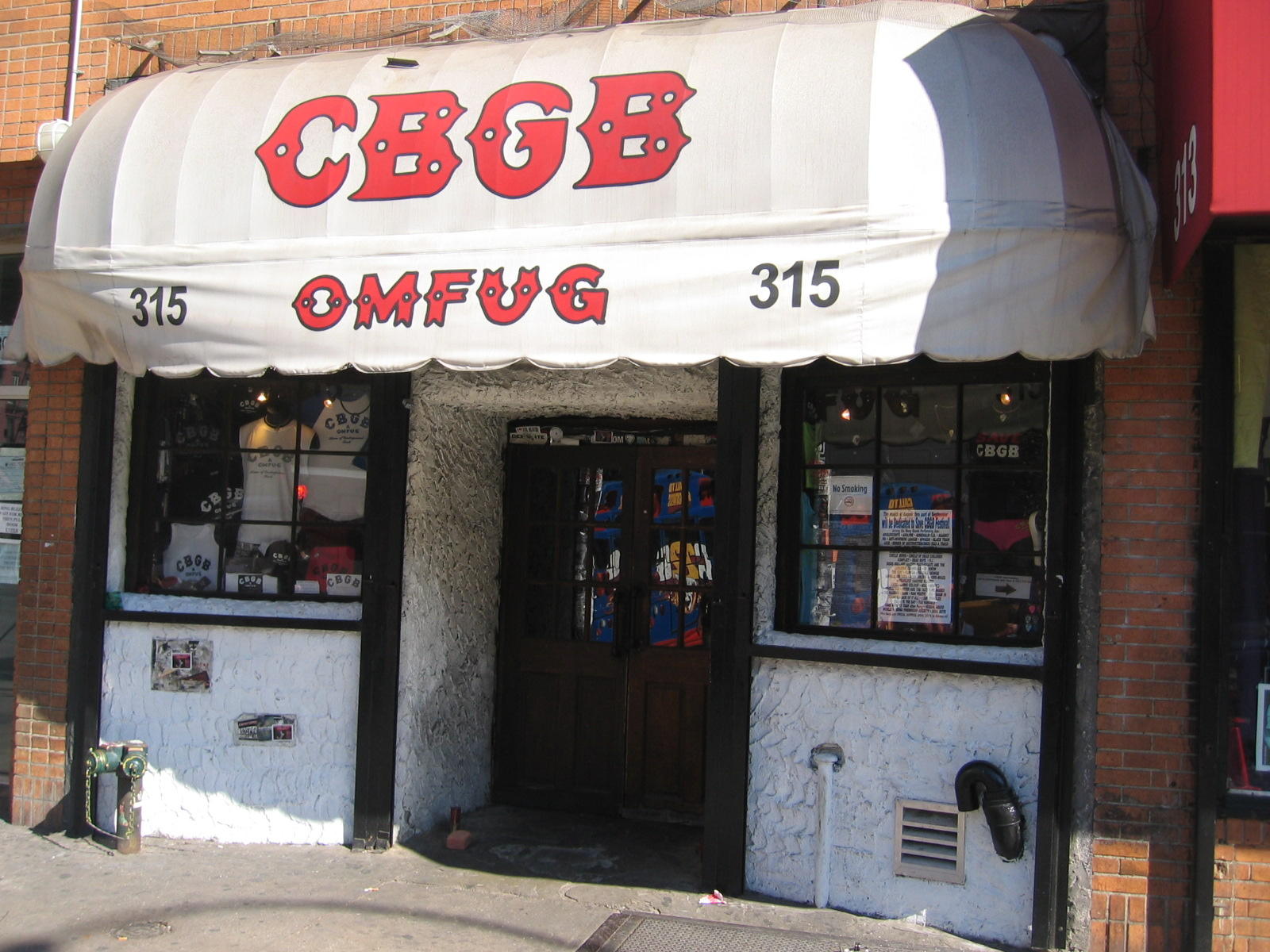
Trailblazer was recorded at famed punk rock club CBGB.

The album was recorded July 18, 1989 at famed punk rock club CBGB in New York City's Bowery neighborhood during All's tour in support of their second studio album, Allroy's Revenge (1989). The show was part of a New Music Seminar showcase and was observed by Jon Pareles of The New York Times, who remarked that the band "had hard-core fans diving from the stage as other audience members hummed along with guitar lines [...] All's songs move at a furious pace but can stop on a dime. In high gear, the band suggests a sunnier version of the Ramones, while some of its newer songs have the yearning tunefulness of The Replacements. All's blaring guitar chords and a crisply explosive rhythm section only make good tunes better."

Prong frontman Tommy Victor served as recording engineer for the live taping. Upon All's return to their hometown of Los Angeles, the recordings were mixed from September 11–13 at Third Wave Recording in Torrance, California by drummer Bill Stevenson and guitarist Stephen Egerton, who both served as record producers.

== Title, artwork, and release ==
Trailblazer is named after a brand of camping toilet the band used while on tour. The album's liner notes explain that, after years of dealing with filthy restrooms at clubs and even resorting to urinating and defecating in cups in their tour van, the band was thrilled to come across the Trailblazer, a cheap, collapsible camping toilet with aluminum alloy legs, a reinforced plastic seat, and disposable bags for collection of the waste. However, one day outside a club in Norwalk, Connecticut, the Trailblazer collapsed and broke beneath the weight of the band's 222-pound roadie Mike "The Pike" Moen (Neutralboy). The album is dedicated to the destroyed toilet, with the epitaph "Trailblazer R.I.P." "We have found no substitute," said bassist Karl Alvarez in 1993, "but we must admit we've tried. So far, club bathrooms have improved. We've been doing better." "When we wrote that," said Stevenson, "those were the days of touring back there in shit holes with no...I mean, stuff has improved for us. Usually there’s OK bathrooms. If not, I still use the double cup method, or I'll just do it behind the trailer on the ground, like neanderthal man." Alvarez added "If no one's going to provide a restroom for you, the least you can do is show your appreciation. So we've left heaps of appreciation from coast to coast. Steaming heaps of appreciation."

Alvarez drew an illustration of the Trailblazer for the cover, while singer Scott Reynolds designed the graphics for the album. Trailblazer was released in 1990 through Cruz Records in LP, cassette, and CD formats. It was the first All release to have the same track listing on all formats; their prior albums had contained additional tracks on the cassette and CD versions that were omitted from the LP releases.

== Reception ==
Leo Finlay of Sounds gave Trailblazer three and a half stars out of five, remarking that it "repeats [eight] of Allroy's Revenge's tracks, and while none are treated drastically differently the live sound makes for an even more compelling mix. The new tracks show no loss of energy either [...] You won’t find anything great lyrically here, but for sheer good-time rock 'n' roll it'd be hard to match 'Fool' or 'She's My Ex', and the ridiculously manic, yet catchy, instrumental 'Gnutheme' just has to be played repeatedly. It'll never be a case of ALL or nothing, but this is one of those little gems you'll keep going back to." Jon Matsumato of BAM commented that "Trailblazer certainly isn't a trailblazing album, but as far as live LPs go, this is like riding shotgun on the band's tour van as it screams down Route 66 [...] the quartet hardly even bothers to stop to catch its collective breath. Songs segue together with such frequency that you end up with what seems like several marathon slam-jams [...] Though new-ish vocalist Scott Reynolds is merely serviceable, the rest of the band is in fine fettle. Billy Stevenson's hammering drum shots are still lethal weapons, while Stephen Egerton also serves up some marvelously warped Black Flag-ish guitar parts." Chris Morris of Musician said that "the club date caught herein captures the sweetly cranked-up fervor that has become the quartet's hallmark. Vocalist Scott Reynolds' work is rawer here than on All's more polished yet still febrile studio records, but the explosive tenderness of numbers like 'Fool', 'Skin Deep', and 'She’s My Ex' combines the songwriting assets of the Buzzcocks and early Black Flag. A review in Billboard called the album "a tightly wound exposition of their hearty, cleverly wrought post-adolescent rockers, played with bash-out energy and knowingly sung by Scott Reynolds.".

== Track listing ==
No.	Title	Writer(s)	Length
1.	"Carnage"	Bill Stevenson	2:40
2.	"Fool"	Karl Alvarez	1:36
3.	"Box"	Scott Reynolds	3:24
4.	"Skin Deep"	Alvarez	1:53
5.	"Just Perfect"	Stevenson	2:54
6.	"Postage"	Stevenson	2:07
7.	"Copping Z"	Alvarez (lyrics), Stephen Egerton (music)	3:02
8.	"She's My Ex"	Stevenson	3:09
9.	"Man-O-Steel"	Tony Lombardo	1:36
10.	"Paper Tiger"	Alvarez	2:24
11.	"Sex in the Way"	Stevenson	2:13
12.	"Check One"	Stevenson	0:44
13.	"I Hate to Love"	Alvarez	1:46
14.	"Gnutheme"	Lombardo	1:58

== Personnel ==
Band

- Karl Alvarez – bass guitar, cover artwork
- Stephen Egerton – guitar, mixing engineer, producer
- Scott Reynolds – vocals, graphics
- Bill Stevenson – drums, mixing engineer, producer

Production

- Tommy Victor – live recording engineer
