= Breaking Things =

Studio album by All
- Released: August 16, 1993
- Recorded: March–April 1993
- Studio: Ardent (Memphis, Tennessee)
- Genre: Punk rock; pop-punk
- Length: 28:44
- Label: Cruz (CRZ-031)
- Producer: Bill Stevenson, Stephen Egerton, John Hampton

All chronology
Percolater (1992)	Breaking Things (1993)	Pummel (1995)

Singles from Percolater
- 1. "Shreen" Released: 1994; 2. "Guilty" Released: 1994

Professional ratings
Review scores
Source	Rating
Allmusic	3/5 stars
Punk News	3/5 stars

Breaking Things is the fifth studio album by the American punk rock band All, released August 16, 1993, through Cruz Records. It was the band's first album with singer Chad Price and their last released through Cruz. The songs "Shreen" and "Guilty" were both released as singles from the album, the former supported by a music video.

== Background ==
I knew it was going to be tough being a singer. It’s obvious, there’s someone new, but I think I was just so stoked to be in my favorite band. Really the stressful thing was just me being so shy, but obviously you get to know people pretty quick when you’re practicing four hours a day every day.

— Chad Price

Singer Scott Reynolds had left All following their 1992 album Percolater. As their new singer they recruited Chad Price, a friend and fan of the band who had sung backing vocals on Percolater. "Chad had been sort of a fan that we just got to be friends with", said guitarist Stephen Egerton. "I'd say there are few people with more of a lucky, natural gift for singing than Chad." Bassist Karl Alvarez remarked that "Chad was really good to have come into play at that time, because he was very laid back. Chad's very laconic, to the point of speechlessness. We didn't really know he was that good of a singer." Drummer Bill Stevenson contacted Milo Aukerman, singer of All's precursor band the Descendents, for his opinion of Price's singing: "Bill said 'Hey, we're trying this guy out for All, what do you think?' and I heard his voice and was like 'Yeah! Get that guy!'" "It was killer", remembered Price. "I was a huge All fan, I grew up with Descendents and stuff."

== Writing ==
As with their prior records, all four band members contributed to the songwriting of Breaking Things. "When Chad joined, we had kind of a backlog," recalled Egerton, "and we all learned each other's songs to get ready for what became Breaking Things. Price wrote "Original Me" and "Stick", as well as lyrics to "Crucified" and "Politics". Alvarez wrote five of the album's songs, more than he had on any previous All album. Egerton wrote the nine-second "Strip Bar" as well as the music for "Rosco" and "Crucified". Rob Williamson of the Tacoma, Washington, band My Name, who had opened for All on tour the previous year, wrote the lyrics for "Rosco".

In addition to the album's two singles, "Shreen" and "Guilty", Stevenson penned "Birthday I.O.U." which described his feelings after Sarina Matteucci, his girlfriend of several years, had an abortion: "There really wasn't a choice / Seventeen was just too young [...] I know you could have been a girl, baby / Now you can't be anything / We needed you to prove our love / We used you, then we killed you". "I remember Sarina got real mad about that song", he said in 1996. "That song is about abortion, and she and I went through this thing where she had an abortion, and that's just my feelings about it. She wasn't too stoked, because she kind of thought I was being right wing about it. It's like, 'Dude, it's not politics; it's just my feelings about it.' I don't give a fuck about politics."

Stevenson and Price's lyrics to "Politics" demand "Keep your politics out of my life / Your politics out of my face / Your politics out of my music". Alvarez described the intent of the song:

I think maybe one of the purposes of music is to transcend politics, and I think when you're judging music with a political criteria, you're ignoring a lot, because music is not political. Music is notes and things swirling around in the air. I think that the bulk of the critical establishment favorably reviews music because of a political slant, not because of the music at all, and it kind of misrepresents what the thing is about. Also, I feel like any time a magazine favorably reviews a left-wing band, à la maybe The Mekons or The Clash, that just opens up the door to the right-leaning bands, "Oh, it's cool to be political in a rock band? Cool, we'll start Skrewdriver.” It gets so asinine, and it was only our statement to keep your politics out of our music and my music.

Musically, Breaking Things leaned toward a more aggressive sound than the band's previous efforts. Alvarez later said "In the '90s, the bands The Lemons and Zeke came into our orbit. It definitely was a much-needed bitch slap in the face to our band musically, because it was very cool to hear bands addressing the stuff with the right amount of aggression." "We fused that really well on Breaking Things with some interesting melodies", said Stevenson. "Breaking Things was an accomplishment for us. I think I was harboring some yearning for that kind of Black Flag power in the guitars, but I don't think it has the intrigue of musical diversity that Allroy Saves (1990) or Allroy's Revenge (1989) has. You're comparing and contrasting these things, but it doesn't work that way, because ultimately it's just us expressing our ideas in our bedroom and then playing them in a garage together, and there's no direction for that."

== Recording and release ==
Breaking Things was recorded in March and April 1993 at Ardent Studios in Memphis, Tennessee, with record producer and recording engineer John Hampton. Stevenson and Egerton also produced the album, and Skidd Mills and Jeffrey Reed served as assistant engineers. Milo Aukerman, who was living in Madison, Wisconsin, at the time, joined the band in the studio to sing backing vocals on the album. Breaking Things was mastered by John Golden at K-Disc in Hollywood, and released August 16, 1993, through Cruz Records in LP, cassette, and CD formats. "Shreen" and "Guilty" were released as the album's singles, and a music video was released for "Shreen". Breaking Things was All's last album for Cruz; they would sign to Interscope Records for their next release, 1995's Pummel.

"Guilty" was used in the soundtrack to the 1995 film Mallrats, and was included on the accompanying soundtrack album.

== Reception ==
The album received mixed reception. Mike Daly of The Aquarian Weekly called the album "Loud, fast, rough, serious, funny, [and] beautiful [,,,] Not since Bad Religion's Recipe for Hate have I heard a record that kicked such major ass, yet had such sweet melodies." Suburban Voice called it "a return to form after the somewhat disappointing Percolator." Mike DaRonco of Allmusic gave Breaking Things three stars out of five, saying "With Chad Price handling the microphone in a deeper, more powerful tone in comparison to previous singer Scott Reynolds, the music has a bit more of a backbone to it. Not to say that All have gone heavy metal (although they do come pretty close with 'Guilty' and 'Crucified'), they're still the same playful, heartbroken teenagers (in the bodies of middle-aged men by now) who continue to share their love for food and fishing. The only significant difference is that the tone isn't as wimpy while they sing about their latest girl trauma." Julie River from Punk News gave the album three out of five stars, saying, "Breaking Things doesn’t hold up to a lot of the best albums in the Descendents/All catalogue, but it has some really great moments and really did churn out a number of All’s greatest classic hits."

== Track listing ==
No.	Title	Writer(s)	Length
1.	"Original Me"	Chad Price	2:46
2.	"Right"	Karl Alvarez	1:55
3.	"Shreen"	Bill Stevenson	2:35
4.	"'Cause"	Alvarez	2:31
5.	"Bail"	Alvarez	0:52
6.	"Excuses"	Alvarez	2:06
7.	"Strip Bar"	Stephen Egerton	0:09
8.	"Horizontal"	Alvarez	1:23
9.	"Guilty"	Stevenson	3:19
10.	"Birthday I.O.U."	Stevenson	2:41
11.	"Rosco"	Rob Williamson (lyrics), Egerton (music)	2:08
12.	"Stick"	Price	2:19
13.	"Crucified"	Price (lyrics), Egerton (music)	3:03
14.	"Politics"	Stevenson (music and lyrics), Price (lyrics)	0:56
Total length:			28:44

== Personnel ==
Band

- Karl Alvarez – bass guitar
- Stephen Egerton – guitar, producer
- Chad Price – vocals
- Bill Stevenson – drums, producer

Additional performers

- Milo Aukerman – backing vocals

Production

- John Golden – mastering
- John Hampton – producer, recording engineer
- Skidd Mills – assistant engineer
- Jeffery Reed – assistant engineer
