= Shreen (song) =

Single by All

from the album Breaking Things
- B-side: "Original Me"; "Crucified"
- Released: 1993
- Recorded: March–April 1993 at Ardent Studios, Memphis, Tennessee
- Genre: Punk rock; power pop
- Length: 8:24
- Label: Cruz (CRZ-030)
- Songwriter: Bill Stevenson
- Producers: Bill Stevenson, Stephen Egerton, John Hampton

All singles chronology
| "Dot" (1992) | "Shreen" (1993) | "Guilty" (1994) |

Audio sample
- file; help

"Shreen" is a song by the American punk rock band All, written by drummer Bill Stevenson and released as the first single from the band's 1993 album Breaking Things. Released in advance of the album, the single also includes two more songs from Breaking Things: "Original Me", written by singer Chad Price, and "Crucified", written by Price and guitarist Stephen Egerton. A music video was also released for "Shreen".

== Background ==
All three songs on the single were recorded with the rest of Breaking Things in March and April 1993 at Ardent Studios in Memphis, Tennessee with record producer and recording engineer John Hampton. Stevenson and Egerton also produced the recordings, and Skidd Mills and Jeffrey Reed served as assistant engineers. Milo Aukerman, of All's precursor band the Descendents, sang backing vocals on the tracks. The recordings were mastered by John Golden at K-Disc in Hollywood, and the "Shreen" single was released through Cruz Records as a 10-inch single and CD single.

== Reception ==
Jack Rabid of Allmusic gave the single two and a half stars out of five, calling it "yet another slice of the same All we all know. How can a band repeat itself so many damn times without boring the bell-bottoms off us? The answer must rest in All/Descendents' pursuit of the perfect tune, like a surfer's perfect wave, leading to Pop-Tarts chorus after Fruit [sic] Loops chorus with plenty of Honeycomb harmonies. Bill Stevenson's post-Black Flag drumming remains the distinctive propulsive element year after decade, and on both 'Shreen' and 'Original Me' he's got his double-snare hits rolling. 'Crucified' is lamentable MOR alternative sludge-rock, but at least All were doing it before it was profitable or MTV-ready."

== Track listing ==
| No. | Title | Writer(s) | Length |
|---|---|---|---|
| 1. | "Shreen" | Bill Stevenson | 2:35 |
| 2. | "Original Me" | Chad Price | 2:46 |
| 3. | "Crucified" | Price (lyrics); Stephen Egerton (music) | 3:03 |
| Total length: | | | 8:24 |

== Personnel ==
Band

- Karl Alvarez – bass guitar
- Stephen Egerton – guitar, producer
- Chad Price – vocals
- Bill Stevenson – drums, producer

Additional performers

- Milo Aukerman – backing vocals

Production

- John Golden – mastering
- John Hampton – producer, recording engineer
- Skidd Mills – assistant engineer
- Jeffery Reed – assistant engineer
