= Allroy's Revenge =

- The album's cover depicts the band's Allroy character preparing to smash an anthropomorphic musical note with a mallet.

Studio album by All
- Released: September 18, 1989
- Recorded: December 1988–January 1989
- Studio: Third Wave Recording, Torrance, California
- Genre: Hardcore punk; pop-punk
- Length: 36:49
- Label: Cruz (CRZ-006)
- Producer: Bill Stevenson

All chronology
Allroy for Prez (1988)	Allroy's Revenge (1989)	Trailblazer (1990)

Singles from Allroy Sez
- 1. "She's My Ex" Released: 1989

Professional ratings
Review scores
Source	Rating
Allmusic	3.5/5 stars

Allroy's Revenge is the second studio album by the American punk rock band All, released in 1989 through Cruz Records. It was the band's first release with singer Scott Reynolds, replacing Dave Smalley who had left in late 1988. The album includes two songs written by Tony Lombardo, the original bassist for All's precursor band the Descendents. It also includes a cover version of "Hot Rod Lincoln", a 1955 song by Charlie Ryan that was a hit for Commander Cody and His Lost Planet Airmen in 1971. "She's My Ex" was released as the album's single.

== Background ==
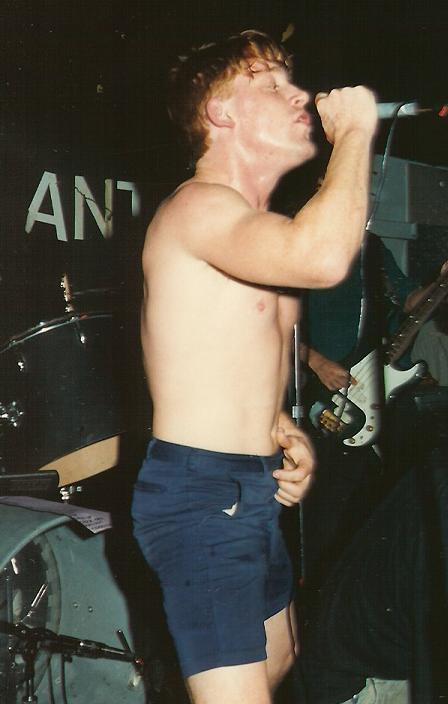
Allroy's Revenge was All's first release with singer Scott Reynolds, who would stay with the band until 1993.

All's first singer, Dave Smalley, left the band in late 1988, burned out by their constant touring schedule. To replace him the band recruited Scott Reynolds, who had moved to Los Angeles from Fredonia, New York several years prior: "I got out of college and got in the car and drove out here because I decided that I wanted to be a singer", he said in 1989. "So I'm out here and I live on a shelf in an office." He joined original Descendents bassist Tony Lombardo's post-Descendents bands Boxer Rebellion, Nuclear Bob, and Three Car Pileup, briefly touring with the Descendents when Boxer Rebellion performed as an opening act for them. The Descendents relaunched themselves as All in 1987 following Milo Aukerman's departure from the band. By the time they were looking for a new singer to replace Smalley, Reynolds was practicing with Three Car Pileup next door to All's headquarters in Lomita, California. "I had nothing back then", he later recalled. "I had no money, I was living in my car, I couldn't even get a shower. I was basically a bum, a homeless bum, and to be on tour playing music was the whole reason I left home. Even though I am too disorganized and right-brained and underachieving to ever be the poster boy for the quest for All." The members of All were impressed by Reynold's singing ability, and quickly recruited him into the band. "It was like we had discovered some great gem sleeping in his car outside our practice room", reflected drummer Bill Stevenson.

== Writing ==
As with their prior records, all four band members contributed to the songwriting of Allroy's Revenge. Stevenson's songs "Scary Sad", "She's My Ex", and "Net" describe a tumultuous romance, and were written about an ex-girlfriend who had problems with drugs and was placed on probation.

Reynolds contributed "Box", "Mary", and "No Traffic". "Mary" particularly impressed Stevenson: "When I heard 'Mary', I was just like 'I want that song. That's an All song'", he recalled. "When he brought the song in," said bassist Karl Alvarez, "he had a guitar, and I think it had three strings on it or something. He literally played that bass figure, basically it's the single note in bass bar." Though the song is credited solely to Reynolds, guitarist Stephen Egerton wrote the guitar parts:

"Mary"
"Mary", written by Reynolds, is built around a single-note bar played on bass guitar. Egerton struggled to come up with the right guitar part to fit the song.

We'd been beating it to death in the practice room forever, trying to figure out some way. I was just struggling with it. I think it was the night before we recorded it, and I just canned everything that I had done and started over, literally the night before I recorded it, and came up with that whole part. I didn't get the chance to play it for Scott before we left for the studio in the morning, so we got back from the studio and I'm like "Okay dude, here's your song, man. I kind of went off the deep end. I hope it's cool." I remember watching him and he was just going "What?"

Though not a member of the band, Tony Lombardo contributed two songs to the album: "Man-O-Steel" and the instrumental "Gnutheme". In 1991 he would again collaborate with All to record New Girl, Old Story, an album of songs he had written between 1979 and 1989.

== Recording, artwork, and release ==
Allroy's Revenge was recorded in December 1988 and January 1989 at Third Wave Recording studios in Torrance, California with recording engineer Richard Andrews, who had worked with the band since 1986. Stevenson produced the album, and he and Egerton served as additional engineers. Adrian Cook and James B. Mansfield were also additional engineers, while Bill Cook provided additional assistance in the studio. As with All's prior releases, Stevenson was very particular in how he wanted the songs to sound. "I've never been in a band where phrasing was so fucking important as this band", recalled Reynolds. "Karl would do some of that too. Not as bad as Bill."

Alvarez illustrated the album's artwork; the cover depicts the band's Allroy character preparing to smash an anthropomorphic musical note with a mallet, while the interior art shows the note bandaged, bruised, and dazed following the beating. The conflict between Allroy and the musical note would later be revisited on the covers of the band's albums Mass Nerder (1998), All (1999), and Problematic (2000).

Allroy's Revenge was released through Cruz Records as a 12-song LP and a 14-song cassette and CD, the latter two including "Carnage" and a cover version of "Hot Rod Lincoln", a 1955 song by Charlie Ryan that was a hit for Commander Cody and His Lost Planet Airmen in 1971. "She's My Ex" was released as the album's single, with the B-side "Crazy?" which had been recorded during the Allroy's Revenge sessions but was not included on the album.

== Reception ==
Jason Ankeny of Allmusic gave Allroy's Revenge three and a half stars out of five, calling it "a faster, punkier outing that lacks the focus and attitude of the group's earlier work. Vocalist-of-the-month Scott Reynolds sings with maturity on existential dilemmas like 'Copping Z' and 'Fool', and his earnestness sets the record's tone; Allroy's Revenge is an ambitious record, but given All's prior success as a goofcore band, an ambitious record is probably the last thing that fans want to hear." A review in Flipside called it "the best All record so far...the songs are more powerful at times, more infectiously hooky at times, and the new kid, Scott Reynolds, blows Smalley away." Cary Darling of the Orange County Register remarked that "Though All has the abrasive guitar crunch of hardcore, [the album] is imbued with so much melody and wit (especially on side two) that it transcends any associations with the style. Tracks like 'She's My Ex' and 'Mary' have all the ragged glory of early Replacements. If these guys were from Minneapolis instead of Lomita, they'd probably be huge.

== Track listing ==
LP version

Side A
No.	Title	Writer(s)	Length
1.	"Gnutheme"	Tony Lombardo	1:39
2.	"Fool"	Karl Alvarez	1:35
3.	"Check One"	Bill Stevenson	0:42
4.	"Scary Sad"	Stevenson	2:45
5.	"Man-O-Steel"	Lombardo	1:37
6.	"Box"	Scott Reynolds	3:18
7.	"Copping Z"	Alvarez (lyrics), Stephen Egerton (music)	2:47

Side B
No.	Title	Writer(s)	Length
8.	"She's My Ex"	Stevenson	3:07
9.	"Bubblegum"	Alvarez	2:36
10.	"Mary"	Reynolds	3:18
11.	"Net"	Stevenson (music and lyrics), Egerton (music)	4:09
12.	"No Traffic"	Reynolds	2:51

CD and cassette versions

No.	Title	Writer(s)	Length
1.	"Gnutheme"	Tony Lombardo	1:39
2.	"Fool"	Karl Alvarez	1:35
3.	"Check One"	Bill Stevenson	0:42
4.	"Scary Sad"	Stevenson	2:45
5.	"Man-O-Steel"	Lombardo	1:37
6.	"Box"	Scott Reynolds	3:18
7.	"Copping Z"	Alvarez (lyrics), Stephen Egerton (music)	2:47
8.	"Hot Rod Lincoln" (originally performed by Charley Ryan and the Livingston Bros.)	Charlie Ryan, Stevenson	2:49
9.	"She's My Ex"	Stevenson	3:07
10.	"Bubblegum"	Alvarez	2:36
11.	"Mary"	Reynolds	3:18
12.	"Net"	Stevenson (music and lyrics), Egerton (music)	4:09
13.	"No Traffic"	Reynolds	2:51
14.	"Carnage"	Stevenson	2:31

== Personnel ==
Band

- Karl Alvarez – bass guitar, cover artwork
- Stephen Egerton – guitar, additional engineer
- Scott Reynolds – vocals
- Bill Stevenson – drums, producer, additional engineer

Additional performers

- Sarina Matteucci – female voice on "Copping Z"

Production

- Richard Andrews – engineer
- Adrian Cook – additional engineer
- Bill Cook – additional assistance
- James B. Mansfield – additional engineer
