= Allroy Sez =

- The album's cover introduced the eponymous character of Allroy, created by bassist Karl Alvarez.

Studio album by All
- Released: March 1988
- Recorded: November–December 1987
- Studio: Third Wave Recording, Torrance, California
- Genre: Punk rock
- Length: 32:15
- Label: Cruz (CRZ-001)
- Producer: Bill Stevenson, Richard Andrews

All chronology
Allroy Sez (1988)	Allroy for Prez (1988)

Singles from Allroy Sez
- 1. "Just Perfect" Released: 1988

Professional ratings
Review scores
Source	Rating
Allmusic	4/5 stars

Allroy Sez is the debut album by the American punk rock band All, released in March 1988 through Cruz Records. Following the departure of singer Milo Aukerman from the Descendents, the remaining members—bassist Karl Alvarez, guitarist Stephen Egerton, and drummer Bill Stevenson—recruited singer Dave Smalley and changed the name of the band to All, which was both the title of the Descendents' 1987 album and a philosophical concept invented by Stevenson and friend Pat McCuistion in 1980. Allroy Sez introduced the character of Allroy, who would serve as a mascot for the band and be featured on many of their subsequent album covers.

== Background ==
The concept of "All" was invented by Descendents drummer Bill Stevenson and his friend Pat McCuistion during a fishing trip on Stevenson's boat Orca in 1980. According to Descendents singer Milo Aukerman, "While drinking all this coffee in the midst of catching mackerel they came up with the concept of All: doing the utmost, achieving the utmost. The more they got into it the more it turned into their own religion. It's partly humor, but it's also an outlook on how to conduct your life: to not settle for some, to always go for All." The concept became the title and theme of the Descendents' 1987 album All, which included the songs "All", "No, All!", and "All-O-Gistics" co-written by Stevenson and McCuistion. Stevenson elaborated on the philosophy:

I'm really into "ALL" and I've waited a long time to unleash the whole concept on people. And now I'm going to do it [...] It's just a way of thinking, in which there are extremes and there is this goal called "ALL". It's a way that I created in dealing with achievement and satisfaction and how the two relate. Basically just to avoid stagnation... going for "ALL" and never being satisfied and just wallowing in your own sameness.

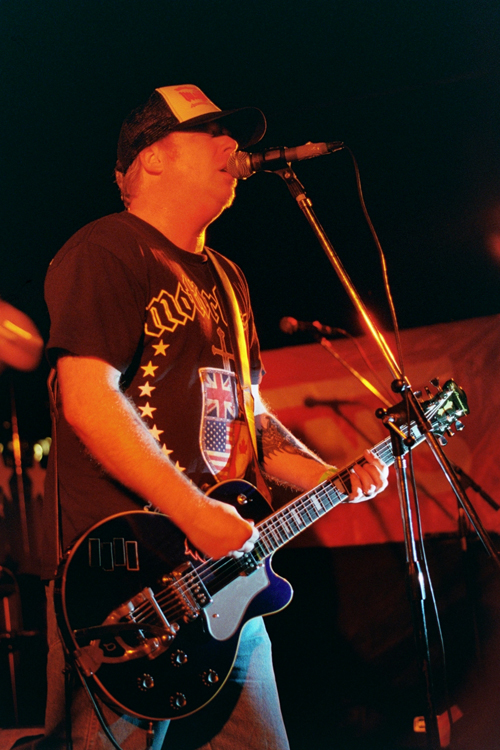
With the addition of singer Dave Smalley, the band changed its name to All.

Aukerman left the Descendents after their summer 1987 "FinALL" tour to pursue a graduate degree in microbiology. With his departure announced in advance, Stevenson took the opportunity to relaunch the band afresh under the name All with singer Dave Smalley, meaning for the new band to be the complete fulfillment of the "All" concept. "I've been wanting to change the name of the band to ALL for eight years", he said during the FinALL tour, adding that he had wanted to work with Smalley for some time but that it would not feel right to continue as the Descendents without Aukerman, and that he wished to shelve the name in case he and Aukerman should wish to use it again at some point. "I think Billy didn't push so hard to become 'new Descendents'", recalled friend of the band Mike Watt, "I think he wanted All to be, actually, a new band. I know it was Billy now in charge totally. He wanted to try this thing where everything was very focused and nothing is derivative."

Smalley, formerly of the Boston-based hardcore punk band DYS and Washington, D.C.–based Dag Nasty, had been attending school in Israel on a scholarship. He flew into Los Angeles and immediately began practicing with the band: "I get off the plane and they're all in the van. They drove me to Alfredo's [Mexican Restaurant], we ate at Alfredo's, and we fucking practiced. I'd been in the plane for thirty million hours...Alfredo's, practice, go!" Guitarist Stephen Egerton recalled that he, Stevenson, and bassist Karl Alvarez "were very much in the swing of a very heavy-duty practice regimen. We prided ourselves on that. We were together 24/7. We did everything together, we ate all our meals together. We were sort of becoming this juggernaut of practice and trying to excel at what we were doing. So Dave just kind of walks into this, so he must have been like 'Wow man, this is really weird. These guys are kind of fanatical.'" "I think that Dave came in strong", said Alvarez. "He got off the plane from Israel and was ready to rock."

== Writing ==
As with the Descendents' albums, all four band members contributed to the songwriting of All's first record. Stevenson, who wrote "Sex in the Way", "Sugar and Spice", and "Just Perfect", remarked that his songwriting process and motivations were no different for All than they had been for the Descendents: "I wasn't writing for a band name, I was writing because some girl was treating me really poorly and I was expressing myself about it. Catharsis. It had nothing to do with Descendents, All, Dave, Milo, or anything."

The songs "Alfredo's" and "Allthymn" were credited to the band as a whole. "Alfredo's" professes the band's love for Alfredo's Mexican Restaurant in Lomita, California, which the members frequented, giving the restaurant's address and telephone number in the lyrics. The restaurant's eponymous proprietor, Alfredo Carrilo, thanked the band by hanging a plaque in the dining area with their picture, a menu, the song's lyrics, and a note of appreciation. "Allthymn" elaborates on the "All" concept, with lyrics "Don't mistake ALL for love or hate / It's not like any other mental state / It's the total extent, when nothing else remains / The utmost possible of possible gains".

== Recording, artwork, and release ==
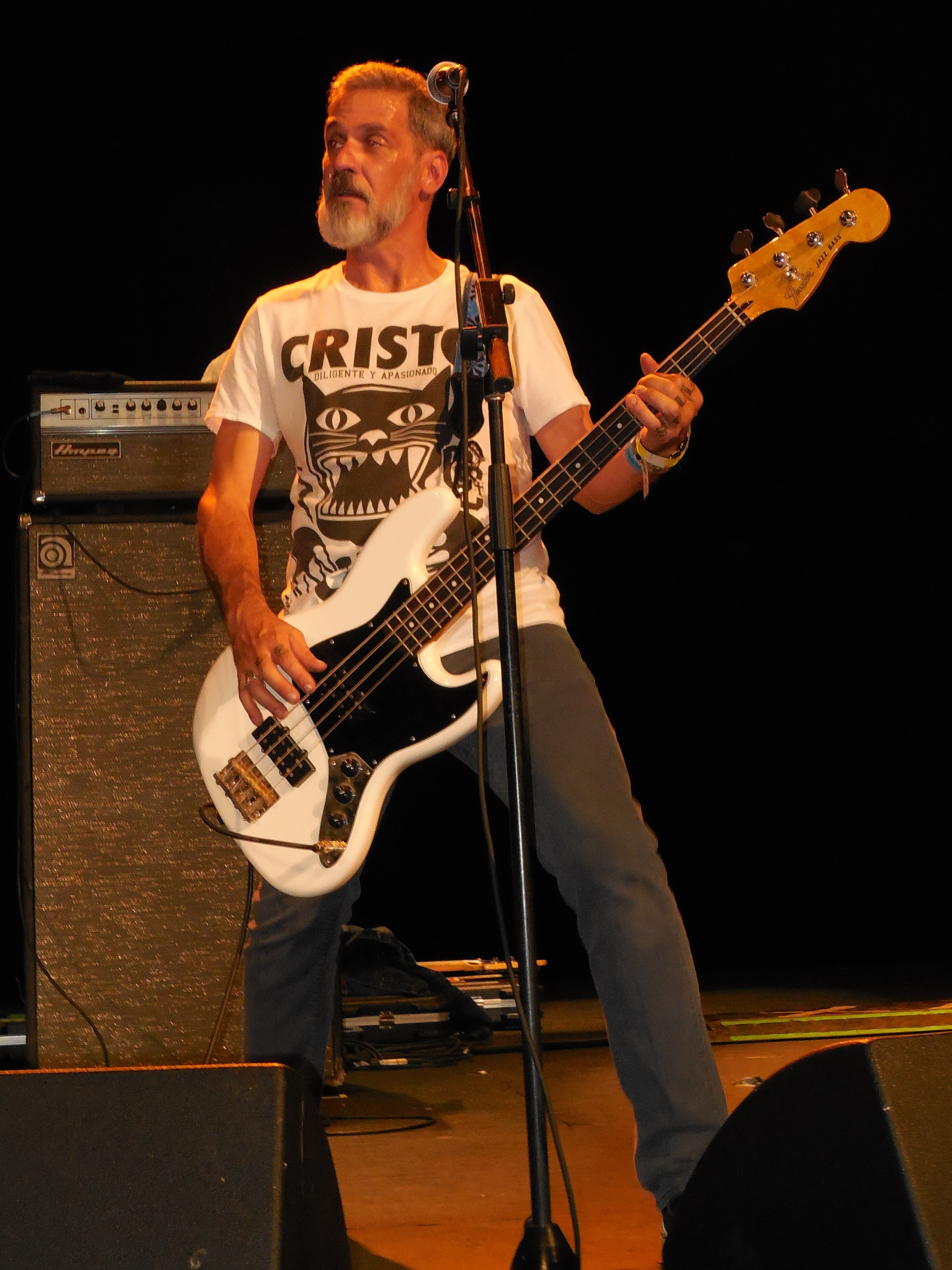
Bassist Karl Alvarez created the album's eponymous character, Allroy.

Allroy Sez was recorded in November and December 1987 at Third Wave Recording studios in Torrance, California. Stevenson served as record producer alongside Richard Andrews, who had worked with the Descendents as a recording engineer since 1986. According to Andrews and the other band members, Stevenson was meticulous in his role as producer. "He would just push and push and push, and it could be really hard", recalled Egerton. "I had to sing 'Just Perfect' for like four hours in the studio until he got the take he wanted", remembered Smalley. "It was constantly a battle with him", said Andrews. "He had ideas of the way things should be, of the way the sounds should be, of the way the mix should be, of the way the songs should be sung, and it had to be his way. It had to be his way, and he was usually right, I gotta say."

Twelve guests sang backing vocals on the album, including Aukerman, Alvarez's brother Mike, Dez Cadena of Black Flag and the DC3, Bob Fitzer of Saccharine Trust, and three members of The Last: Joe Nolte, Mike Nolte, and David Nazworthy. On December 16, 1987, while the album was being recorded, Pat McCuistion died when his fishing boat sank during a storm. "He was deep-sea fishing and his boat sank because he'd loaded like fifteen tons of fish onto a boat designed for seven or eight, and he'd just kept piling them on", said Stevenson. "He was truly questing ALL." Allroy Sez was dedicated to McCuistion.

The album's cover introduced the eponymous character of Allroy, a yellow-skinned cartoon character with spiked hair, whorls for eyes, and a large, toothy grin. Allroy was created by Alvarez, based on a caricature he had drawn of Egerton for the Descendents' 1987 "FinALL" tour posters. A "representative of all things Allular", Allroy became the band's mascot and equivalent to the Descendents' Milo character. Alvarez also drew the character for All's subsequent releases Allroy for Prez (1988), Allroy's Revenge (1989), and Allroy Saves (1990).

Allroy Sez was the first album released through Cruz Records, an imprint of SST Records (SST had released the Descendents' 1987 albums All and Liveage!). It was released in March 1988 as a 10-song LP and a 12-song cassette and CD, the latter two containing the additional tracks "Allthymn" and "Don Quixote". A single was released for "Just Perfect" with the B-side "Wishing Well", which had been recorded during the Allroy Sez sessions but was not included on the album.

== Reception ==
"Sugar and Spice"
Al Campbell compared "Sugar and Spice" to The Osmonds.

Mike Gitter of Rip magazine said that with Allroy Sez, the band's "previously segregated pop and discordant extremes achieve unique cohesiveness." He praised Stevenson's songwriting, compared Smalley's singing to "a younger Roger Daltrey", and said "Alvarez and Egerton emerge stronger players than contributions with the Descendents or their previous outfit the Massacre Guys would reveal [...] All's debut effort achieves a unique culmination of Descendents' development and growth to date while hinting at a great deal more." Writing for the Los Angeles Times, Mike Boehm remarked that "with its sharp production, newly prominent harmonies and catchy melodies, mostly in the service of love songs, Allroy Sez is probably the kind of album most Descendents/ALL fans want, Stevenson said, and it is the best-selling record the band has done." Al Campbell of Allmusic gave the album four stars out of five, saying "The entire album contains enough pop hooks to win over the most jaded listener; a few decades ago, the pop gems of Allroy Sez would have crackled out of AM radios everywhere. 'Sugar and Spice' could have come off The Osmonds' Phase III or Homemade albums had the Mormon brothers cranked up the guitars." Campbell's colleague Jack Rabid, however, opined that the album "was OK but way short of the Descendents/All's standards", saying that their EP Allroy for Prez, released later the same year, "is so much better that it makes its predecessor sound stillborn."

== Track listing ==
LP version

Side A
No.	Title	Writer(s)	Length
1.	"Pretty Little Girl"	Karl Alvarez	1:56
2.	"Hooidge"	Dave Smalley (lyrics), Alvarez (music)	2:16
3.	"Sex in the Way"	Bill Stevenson	2:19
4.	"Alfredo's"	Alvarez, Smalley, Stevenson, Stephen Egerton	3:52
5.	"Sugar and Spice"	Stevenson	3:13

Side B
No.	Title	Writer(s)	Length
1.	"Just Perfect"	Stevenson	2:58
2.	"Paper Tiger"	Alvarez	2:36
3.	"Auto Wreck"	Alvarez (music and lyrics), Egerton (music)	2:27
4.	"#10 (Wet)"	Alvarez (lyrics), Smalley (music)	2:31
5.	"A Muse"	Smalley (lyrics), Egerton (music)	3:20
Total length:			27:32

CD and cassette versions

No.	Title	Writer(s)	Length
1.	"Pretty Little Girl"	Karl Alvarez	1:56
2.	"Hooidge"	Dave Smalley (lyrics), Alvarez (music)	2:16
3.	"Sex in the Way"	Bill Stevenson	2:19
4.	"Alfredo's"	Alvarez, Smalley, Stevenson, Stephen Egerton	3:52
5.	"Sugar and Spice"	Stevenson	3:13
6.	"Allthymn"	Alvarez, Smalley, Stevenson, Egerton	3:05
7.	"Just Perfect"	Stevenson	2:58
8.	"Paper Tiger"	Alvarez	2:36
9.	"Auto Wreck"	Alvarez (music and lyrics), Egerton (music)	2:27
10.	"#10 (Wet)"	Alvarez (lyrics), Smalley (music)	2:31
11.	"A Muse"	Smalley (lyrics), Egerton (music)	3:20
12.	"Don Quixote"	Smalley	1:42
Total length:			32:15

== Personnel ==
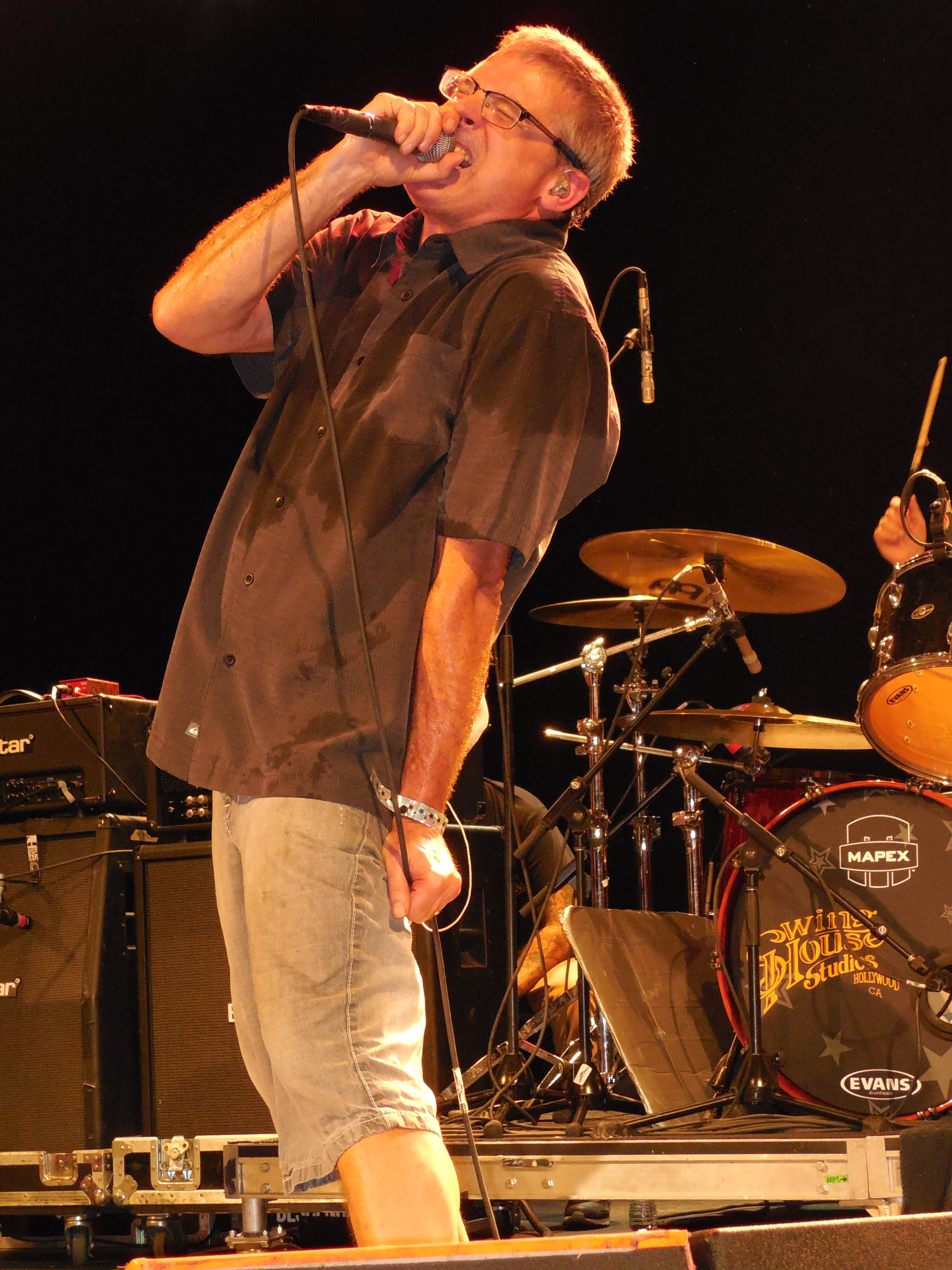
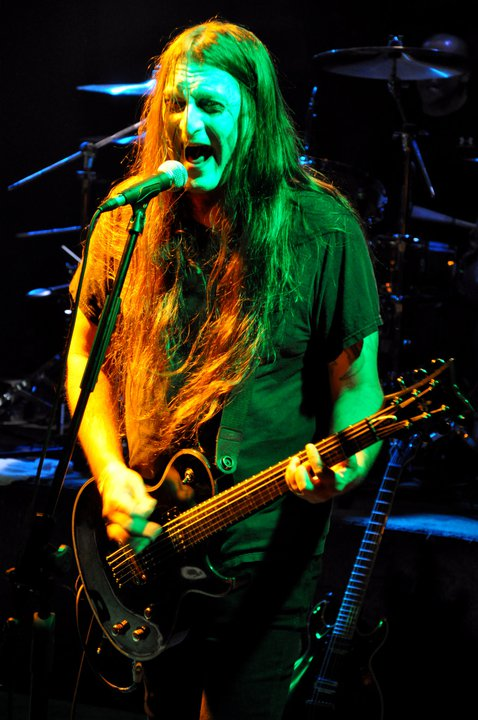
Milo Aukerman (left) and Dez Cadena (right) are among the backing singers on the album.

Band

- Karl Alvarez – bass guitar, backing vocals, cover drawings
- Stephen Egerton – guitar, backing vocals
- Dave Smalley – lead vocals
- Bill Stevenson – drums, backing vocals, producer

Additional performers

- Mike Alvarez – backing vocals
- Milo Aukerman – backing vocals
- Dez Cadena – backing vocals
- Bob Fitzer – backing vocals
- Ilisa Katz – backing vocals
- Shana Lipton – backing vocals
- David Nazworthy – backing vocals
- Maxine Nazworthy – backing vocals
- Joe Nolte – backing vocals
- Mike Nolte – backing vocals
- Ariane Owens – backing vocals
- Scott Padgett – backing vocals

Production

- Richard Andrews – producer
