= Percolater (album) =

- The cover painting was done by singer Scott Reynolds. It was All's first studio album not to feature their mascot, Allroy, on the cover.

Studio album by All
- Released: May 12, 1992
- Studio: Chapman Recording Studios, Kansas City, Missouri; Nightingale Studio, Nashville, Tennessee; Ardent Studios, Memphis, Tennessee
- Genre: Punk rock
- Length: 32:48
- Label: Cruz (CRZ-022)
- Producer: Bill Stevenson, Stephen Egerton

All chronology
New Girl, Old Story (1991)	Percolater (1992)	Breaking Things (1993)

Singles from Percolater
- 1. "Dot" Released: 1992

Percolater is the fourth studio album by the American punk rock band All, released May 12, 1992 through Cruz Records. It was the band's first album recorded after their relocation from Los Angeles to Brookfield, Missouri, and their first studio release recorded outside of California. It was also their last album with singer Scott Reynolds, who left the band after the album's supporting tours. A single and music video were released for the song "Dot".

== Background ==
I mean, we made nothing. It was just impractical for us to live in California, and we weren’t there that much anyway. So Bill came up with the idea "Hey, my dad has this house out here in rural Missouri where he grew up", and it worked out to be really good for us because it enabled us to have bedrooms and neat shit like that.

— Stephen Egerton

For several years, All and their precursor band, the Descendents, had been headquartered in a storefront along the Pacific Coast Highway in Lomita, California that housed the band's living quarters, practice space, and office. "We really needed [the band] to succeed", recalled singer Scott Reynolds. "We were broke and filthy and we lived like animals." The band paid US$1,200 per month for the small two-room space and had to deal with loud, drunken neighbors. Being on tour some eight months out of each year, the band members decided it was no longer practical to live there. "I just said 'I can't do this anymore'", remarked drummer Bill Stevenson "The area we were in became infested with other groups that were more interested in smoking dope and drinking and all that. It became a party center, which I just can't stand." Stevenson's father, who lived in California, owned a house in his hometown of Brookfield, Missouri—a farming town with a population of about 3,500—which he rented out, and offered to rent it to the band for $350 per month. In addition to the lower cost of living, the band also reasoned that being based in the central United States rather than on the west coast might be advantageous to their frequent touring schedule.

The band members made the move to Missouri immediately following the March 1990 recording of Allroy Saves (1990) and New Girl, Old Story (1991). "We can't afford to live in L.A.", said Stevenson days before the relocation. "I've been living under my desk for nine years. The last time I had a bedroom was in early high school." "That was a financial necessity", recalled bassist Karl Alvarez, "because L.A., at the level of poverty we were at, was not that easy of a place to be. We were living in a practice space, for crying out loud [...] Bear in mind all this while that our fortunes rose and fell together. We were all living in the same place. Kind of like The Monkees on the TV show, only with more dirt and smell." Their new house was large enough to accommodate all four band members, their roadies Daniel "Bug" Snow and Curtis, and Stevenson's girlfriend of several years, Sarina Matteucci, who sold the band's merchandise through mail order and while on tour. "We had to move, or it would have caused the band to break up", said Stevenson. "So now we all have our own rooms, and we have a decent office to run the bookings and everything to keep it all going smoothly. We have a kitchen and things like that which we never had before. We're paying one-fourth the rent we were paying in L.A." "To have your own room, that in itself is just 'Wow, this is rad!', said guitarist Stephen Egerton, "Where I guess a lot of people my age would sort of be wanting to have a house." "The only disadvantage is that there's not really anything going on culturally or socially—nothing", said Stevenson, "But we're not interested in disturbing these people's quiet existence. We're more interested in something of that nature ourselves."

== Writing ==
As with their prior records, all four band members contributed to the songwriting of Percolater. Reynolds' "MO. 63" describes driving on U.S. Route 63 through the band's new surroundings: "Fat, farting Guernseys chew their cuds at me / Missouri 63 / Big Buford lawman ten miles from Moberly / Says 'you got a taillight on the right side that don't work properly'". The album includes three instrumental tracks—"Charligan", "Birds", and "Gnugear (Hot)"—out of five in the band's whole catalog; authorship of these tracks is not listed in the album's credits.

Two hours of sleep at night, two full time jobs
I know you did your best
You and the egg timer
We didn't go fishing and we didn't play ball
I know you did your best
You and the egg timer
[...]
I hope I never have to use it the way you did

— from Bill Stevenson's lyrics to "Egg Timer"

Stevenson's "Egg Timer" describes his relationship with his father, Steve, who raised him after his parents divorced. Beginning with the lyric "Two generation gaps between us", it goes on to describe the divorce ("She took all your money, she left a note on the door / We had TV dinners and we called her a whore") and how Steve worked two jobs, sleeping an hour in between with an egg timer as an alarm clock:

I was born when my father was 50, so when [the Descendents' first album] Milo Goes to College came out he was 69. He was a good man, but he was very cruel, very cold. He would sleep for one hour in the morning when he got home from work, and then he would go to his other job, and then he would sleep for one hour in the evening, after giving me dinner, to go to his night job. So he would sleep for two hours a day, one hour in the morning and one hour at night. He did that for a lot of years. My mom put us into financial ruination because she was an alcoholic, so he had to catch up, and he stepped up to the plate and did what had to be done so we wouldn't lose our house. I had so much admiration for him because of that, but at the same time, he was such a cold man, and that made it really hard to have a father-son relationship.

Stevenson also penned "Minute" and "Hotplate". He later said "on that record I didn't have really any good songs, so it's like 'Okay, a lot of lip from you, Stevenson. Where's your good song?' And it's like 'I don’t have any.'" Reynolds recalled that the band's songwriting during this period made for an inconsistent overall sound: "The four distinct musical camps, and I think they're all very strong in their own way, made for a pretty eclectic collection of songs. If you consider music our child, our baby, you got four different parents. What are you gonna do? It’s gonna fuck up eventually."

== Recording and cover art ==
All's previous studio releases had been recorded at Third Wave Recording in Torrance, California. With their relocation, Percolater was recorded at Chapman Recording Studios in Kansas City, Missouri and at Nightingale Studio in Nashville, Tennessee. Stevenson and Egerton produced the album and served as additional recording engineers. Backing vocals on the album were sung by the Claycomo County Choir and by Chad Price, a fan of the band who would replace Reynolds as their lead singer the following year. "Chad had been sort of a fan that we just got to be friends with", said Egerton. The recordings were mixed by John Hampton at Ardent Studios in Memphis, Tennessee. Percolater was All's first studio release not to be titled after their mascot, Allroy, and not to feature the character on the cover. Instead, Reynolds painted the image for the album cover.

== Release and Reynolds' departure ==
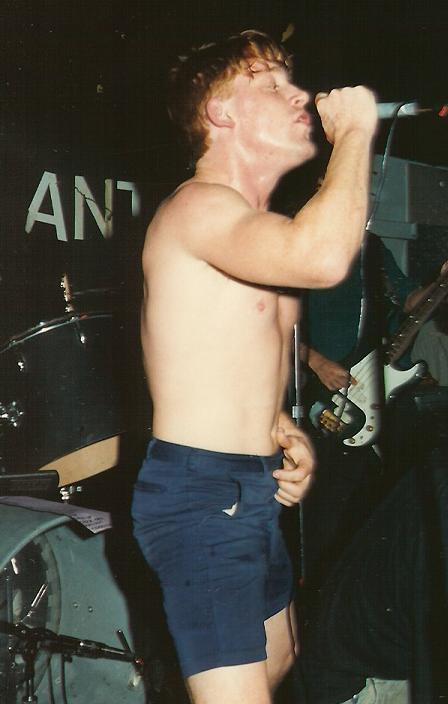
Percolater was All's last album with singer Scott Reynolds.

Percolater was released May 12, 1992 through Cruz Records in LP, cassette, and CD formats. A music video was filmed for the song "Dot", which was released as the album's single. The single also included "Can't Say" and a cover version of "A Boy Named Sue", which were recorded during the Percolater sessions but were left off of the album.

Percolater was the band's last album with Scott Reynolds, who left the group the following year. "If you listen to Percolator," he later said, "this is where the rift started with us, because our philosophies began to diverge." The tensions culminated in an argument with Alvarez:

I just started not showing up for practice, and just kind of being a dick, and Karl was being a dick. [...] We lived on top of each other on the same floor of a house in this little, shitty town with girlfriends and future wives, and it just got horrible. We ended up just screaming at each other, and Bill took us in the van, and we were talking like "Well, what's the deal? What's the story with this? Are you guys gonna figure it out?" "Yeah, we're gonna figure it out." [...] I went to Bill to talk about it and said "Look, I can't handle this. I need an apology", and he goes "He’s not gonna apologize. Everybody's pissed at you right now anyway because you don't practice and you're a dick, and that's not going to happen." I go "Well, it has to happen or I quit", and he’s like "Well, it's not going to", and I go "Okay, then I quit." So then I just did the Europe tour. I did a whole Europe tour, 60 shows in 65 days, and I did it all with people who I was mad at and I'd quit on, and as the thing went on and I realized how much pressure was off of me, it just became more fun, and then when I left I was really sad to go.

Alvarez recalled that "From my end of it, I guess I perceived him to be losing motivation. There's things I regret about that situation, but at the end of the day I think he probably, one way or the other, would have moved on, and I probably forced his hand a little, maybe." "At the end I just wanted so badly to go do something else", said Reynolds in 2013. "Every decision I've made since I left the band has been the wrong decision. On the one hand, I wanted my independence. On the other hand, ironically, that's why I'm a barback now." Chad Price replaced Reynolds as the band's lead singer.

== Reception ==
Deborah Orr of CMJ New Music Report remarked that "All try changing tempos a little on this record, creating suspense by slowing things down, reminding us of Youth Brigade once they dropped the 'Youth' and signed to Enigma, or 7 Seconds around the same epoch. Scott Reynolds can't always hit those high notes on the choruses, but an endearing, youthful effect is achieved when his voice cracks. While some of All's more experimental efforts are a little on the flatulent side (like a whole track of someone tuning a guitar), 'Dot' is classic All, whizzy and boiling over with happy punk sentiments, and 'Wonder', 'Empty', and 'Minute' remain true to formula." Mike DaRonco of Allmusic gave Percolater three stars out of five, calling it "All's most playful album to date, and the recording refrains from laying it on thick with tales of heartbreak and bad days; this time around, it's more about just having fun. If the instrumental tracks such as 'Charligan' and 'Birds' fail to bring the mood to an uppity level, 'Dot', 'Nothin'', and 'Breathe' will definitely strike a nerve. Just completely ignore the song 'Hotplate', which has this scary resemblance to Def Leppard during their Pyromania era.

== Track listing ==
No.	Title	Writer(s)	Length
1.	"Charligan"	Scott Reynolds	1:30
2.	"Nothin'"	Karl Alvarez	1:57
3.	"Dot"	Reynolds	2:01
4.	"Nobody's"	Alvarez	3:57
5.	"Wonder"	Reynolds	1:37
6.	"Minute"	Bill Stevenson	1:27
7.	"Birds"		2:46
8.	"Empty"	Alvarez	3:15
9.	"MO. 63"	Reynolds	1:45
10.	"Egg Timer"	Stevenson (lyrics); Stephen Egerton (music)	2:52
11.	"Gnugear (Hot)"		1:06
12.	"Hotplate"	Stevenson	4:04
13.	"Hey Bug"	Alvarez, Egerton, Reynolds, Stevenson	0:38
14.	"Breathe"	Alvarez	3:53

== Personnel ==
Band

- Karl Alvarez – bass guitar
- Stephen Egerton – guitar, additional engineering, producer
- Scott Reynolds – vocals, piano, cover painting
- Bill Stevenson – drums, additional engineering, producer

Additional performers

- Mike Alvarez – additional vocals
- Chad Price – backing vocals
- Claycomo County Choir – backing vocals

Production

- E – additional engineering
- Erik Flettrich – additional engineering
- John Hampton – mixing engineer
- Rich Hanson – additional engineering
- Paul Ingold – photographs
- Tiffany Linnes – photographs
- G.E. Teel – additional engineering
