= All (band) =

American punk band

ALL
- All's logo, which appears on the covers of all their releases

Background information
- Origin: Los Angeles, California, U.S.
- Genres: Pop-punk; punk rock; skate punk
- Works: Discography
- Years active: 1987–2003; 2008–present
- Labels: Cruz; Interscope; Epitaph
- Spinoff of: Descendents
- Members: Chad Price; Stephen Egerton; Karl Alvarez; Bill Stevenson
- Past members: Dave Smalley; Scott Reynolds

All (stylized ALL) is an American punk rock band originally from Los Angeles, California, currently based in Fort Collins, Colorado. The group was formed by Descendents members Bill Stevenson, Karl Alvarez, and Stephen Egerton.

== History ==
=== Formation and Cruz Records years ===
All formed in suburban Los Angeles in 1987 when Milo Aukerman, the lead singer of the Descendents, left to pursue a graduate degree in biochemistry, and the band into a hiatus. The remaining members, guitarist Stephen Egerton, bassist Karl Alvarez, and drummer Bill Stevenson, decided to carry on as a band, adopting the title of the Descendents' last studio album, ALL, as their official moniker. Their first unofficial show as ALL was on January 30, 1988 at a private party in Hermosa Beach, California.

Enlisting former Dag Nasty and DYS singer Dave Smalley on vocal duties, ALL released their first album and EP in 1988, Allroy Sez and the EP Allroy for Prez (both distributed by Cruz Records), to critical acclaim. In 1989, Smalley left the band, and new vocalist Scott Reynolds joined. With Reynolds, ALL released four more albums: 1989's Allroy's Revenge (which included the single "She's My Ex"), 1990's Allroy Saves, 1992's Percolater, and the 1990 live album Trailblazer. Also during this time, the band recorded New Girl, Old Story, an album with former Descendents member Tony Lombardo under the band name TonyALL.

The band lived in a small office complex (as referenced in the Scott Reynolds–penned song "Box"), and toured nearly nonstop. Following a brief stint in rural Brookfield, Missouri, the band eventually relocated to Fort Collins, Colorado; the centrally located city made touring the west and east coasts of the country considerably easier. Reynolds left the band in 1993 and was replaced by vocalist Chad Price. The album Breaking Things was released in 1993 to generally positive reviews, and the songs "Guilty" and "Shreen" were released as singles.

=== Interscope/Epitaph years ===
ALL briefly joined major label Interscope Records for 1995's Pummel, but disputes over marketing and promotion of the album ended their relationship quickly. The song "Million Bucks" was released as a single and a video, but the album ultimately received rather mixed reviews from fans and critics alike. The band was signed by Epitaph Records shortly after.

At this time, Milo Aukerman, now a full-time biochemist, returned to the Descendents and recorded their 1996 comeback album Everything Sucks, also on Epitaph. Stevenson, Alvarez, and Egerton continued to tour and record with both bands, eventually releasing ALL's critically acclaimed 1998 album Mass Nerder, 2000's Problematic, and the 2001 Descendents/ALL live split, Live Plus One.

According to a 2004 interview with Bill Stevenson, ALL is no longer under contract with Epitaph Records, and any new ALL material will be released on their own label, Owned & Operated Records

=== Hiatus ===
The band has previously talked about having two albums in the works; however, there has not been any news on them in some time. One album, which was written and partially recorded in early 2002 while the band was recording the Descendents' album Cool to Be You, is reported to consist of all-new material with the familiar All sound, while the other is planned to be much more experimental, with a heavier emphasis on instrumental compositions.

All went through a multi-year period of inactivity, with members working on other projects across the country. Bill Stevenson and Karl Alvarez both live in Fort Collins, Colorado; Stevenson is currently playing with Only Crime and the Lemonheads, and running his own recording studio, The Blasting Room, while Alvarez has contributed bass to the Lemonheads' 2006 album and Underminer and has toured with Gogol Bordello. Stephen Egerton currently lives in Tulsa, Oklahoma, with his family, running his own studio, Armstrong Records. Stephen has several music projects in the works. The first, 40Engine, is with former vocalist Scott Reynolds; another is an instrumental band named Slorder, and he also plays bass and drums with a guitarist named Jason Crowley under the name Crowley/Egerton. Chad Price is playing in the Colorado alt-country band Drag the River and tours playing bass for Rocky Votolato.

=== Reunion ===
On January 26, 2008, Egerton, Stevenson, and Alvarez reunited with Scott Reynolds to play a set of All songs as an opening act for Drag the River at the Aggie in Fort Collins. In mid-April of that year, the band announced that they would be reuniting once again with Reynolds for Chicago, Illinois's Riot Fest on October 12. They performed at the Congress Theater in Chicago, playing for less than an hour before Chicago police shut down the show.

Additionally, All performed two warm-up shows: one in Japan in July 2008 and the other at the Democratic National Convention in Denver, Colorado, on August 29, 2008. The DNC show was cut short and the band completed an additional set that evening at the 3 Kings Tavern in downtown Denver.

In July 2009 the band completed a short tour with Big Drill Car, going across Southern California. Former Descendents bandmate Tony Lombardo joined the band on stage on July 18 and 19 of that tour for two songs, to a very welcoming crowd.

In an interview with RiotFest.org, Scott Reynolds did not rule out the possibility of writing new material but set three conditions that need to be present: people want to hear new music, he feels the need to create, and the "bro" factor between the bandmates needs to be there.

All played a one-off performance in Portland, Oregon, at Dante's on October 3, 2009.

In the beginning of 2010, the band was set to perform a short tour on the East Coast, with Off with Their Heads and Shot Baker. The shows were postponed due to health issues with Bill Stevenson, and were never rescheduled. At the 2011 Punk Rock Bowling, the band played a set with all three of their singers, Dave Smalley, Scott Reynolds, and Chad Price. From 2011 to 2014 the band played various shows around the U.S. On February 16, 2013, the band performed at The Mohawk in Austin, Texas, as part of a cancer benefit.

On September 9, 2014, after a showing of Filmage at the Downtown Independent theater in Los Angeles, ALL played a dual set with both Chad and Scott, followed by a Descendents karaoke part where both Chad and Scott sang Descendents songs, along with surprise guest vocalists: London May (Samhain); Phi Lo (the Last); members of the Filmage crew, James, Justin & Deedle; Jen Razavi (the Bombpops); Marko DeSantis (Bad Astronaut) & Ken Stringfellow (Posies); Dennis Lyxzén (Refused); Davey Havok (AFI); Jim Lindberg (Pennywise); and Matt Skiba (Alkaline Trio, Blink 182). With Chad in vocals, ALL played Amnesia Rockfest in 2015.

Throughout the Descendents' touring cycle from 2016 to 2018, both Chad and Scott have performed songs with the band at various shows. On August 3, 2018, during a Descendents show in Buffalo, New York, the band performed two songs after bringing out Scott Reynolds as a special guest. On November 18, 2018, All played a show to celebrate the Descendents ending their 2018 "Tourage" where they played a dual set with both Scott and Chad on vocals in Tulsa.

ALL played two sets at Washington's in Fort Collins, Colorado in November 2019 with Dave Smalley and Scott Reynolds to celebrate the 25th Anniversary of the Blasting Room. Their next show took place with Chad on vocals at Punk Rock Bowling in 2021. They have since reunited to play Fest in 2023, and a Punk Rock Bowling pre show in 2024.

== Mascot ==
Allroy as drawn by artist Chris Shary

All's mascot is Allroy, a neon bright yellow cartoon character with spiked hair, whorls for eyes, and a large, toothy grin, often depicted engaged in conflict with an anthropomorphic musical note. Allroy was created by bassist Karl Alvarez, based on a caricature he had drawn of guitarist Stephen Egerton for the Descendents' 1987 "FinALL" tour posters. "When they go out on tour, Stephen likes to be the one that drives", said artist Chris Shary. "Well, he'd been up for a while, just pounding coffee, and Karl was in the back, and Stephen just turned back to look at him and it was this crazed [look], like almost the eyes spinning, and the big grin, and so Karl drew that out and that was the FinALL tour drawing. It just kind of went from there and got tweaked a little bit, and there was Allroy." Meant to be All's equivalent to the Descendents' Milo character, Allroy is "representative of all things Allular", said Alvarez, adding "I swear to God I'd never seen The Simpsons when I drew that design", noting the character's resemblance to Bart Simpson (the Simpson family characters debuted April 19, 1987, on The Tracey Ullman Show, while Allroy debuted a year later on the cover of All's debut album Allroy Sez).

Allroy is the eponymous character of All's early releases Allroy Sez (1988), Allroy for Prez (1988), Allroy's Revenge (1989), and Allroy Saves (1990), and appears on the covers of these releases in illustrations done by Alvarez. Allroy was absent from the band's cover art for much of the 1990s before being revived for Mass Nerder (1998), as drawn by Chris Shary. Shary also drew Allroy for the cover of the compilation album All (1999), and he and Alvarez together illustrated the character for the cover of Problematic (2000).

== Band members ==
Current members

- Karl Alvarez – bass (1987–present)
- Stephen Egerton – guitar (1987–present)
- Bill Stevenson – drums (1987–present)
- Chad Price – vocals (1993–present)

Former members

- Dave Smalley – vocals (1987–1989)
- Scott Reynolds – vocals (1989–1993, 2025)

== Discography ==
Studio albums

- Allroy Sez (1988)
- Allroy's Revenge (1989)
- Allroy Saves (1990)
- New Girl, Old Story (1991)
- Percolater (1992)
- Breaking Things (1993)
- Pummel (1995)
- Mass Nerder (1998)
- Problematic (2000)
