= Pummel (album) =

Studio album by All
- Released: April 11, 1995
- Recorded: October–November 1994
- Studios: The Blasting Room (Fort Collins, Colorado); Ardent (Memphis, Tennessee)
- Genres: Punk rock; pop-punk
- Length: 34:39
- Label: Interscope (INTD-92528)
- Producers: Bill Stevenson, Stephen Egerton

All chronology
Breaking Things (1993)	Pummel (1995)	Mass Nerder (1998)

Pummel is the sixth studio album by the American punk rock band All, released on April 4, 1995, through Interscope Records. It was the band's only album released through a major record label, and the first album recorded at The Blasting Room, a recording studio in Fort Collins, Colorado, built by the band members and financed with money acquired from their recording contract with Interscope.

== Background ==
All's previous albums had been released through Cruz Records, an independent record label that was an imprint of SST Records. With the commercial success of punk and alternative rock bands in the early 1990s, All began considering offers from major labels. "Major label talk started probably around '93 or '94", recalled guitarist Stephen Egerton. "We maybe were just looking to sort of go to the next place, maybe. We had done this slow building up to where as many as a thousand people might be coming to see us in some places, which for us was a huge deal, so we thought we'd try to see if maybe we could get the records out to more people." "In the past year or so we've seen bands like Green Day and Season to Risk turning up at the Walmart in Brookfield, Missouri", remarked bassist Karl Alvarez. "We really like the idea of getting our records in places where people go who aren't hip to the mom-and-pop record stores that traditionally carry the independents. People forget that punk rock was on the majors early on with bands like Iggy and the Ramones. The fact that the major labels ignored the real groundbreaking rock of the '80s gave everyone a real bad feeling about the majors, but as it stands now, they are starting to get a little hipper."

The band signed to Interscope Records, and in June 1994 used the money acquired from their recording contract to relocate from Brookfield to Fort Collins, Colorado, where Alvarez had lived as a child and where drummer Bill Stevenson's girlfriend lived. "We moved to Fort Collins with the advent of the major label because we finally had enough money to live like normal people after all those years", Alvarez later said. "That was the first time we had ever lived in separate residences. At the time I was actually married, which was a new one for the band to deal with, and everyone’s moving in their different circles, but we kept touring and making records." "Los Angeles was too big. Brookfield was too small. This is just right", he said in 1995. "When we lived in Brookfield and wanted to do a local gig, we'd have to drive two hours to Columbia or six hours to St. Louis. It's a lot easier here, and the kids are real cool. So I think we'll stay."

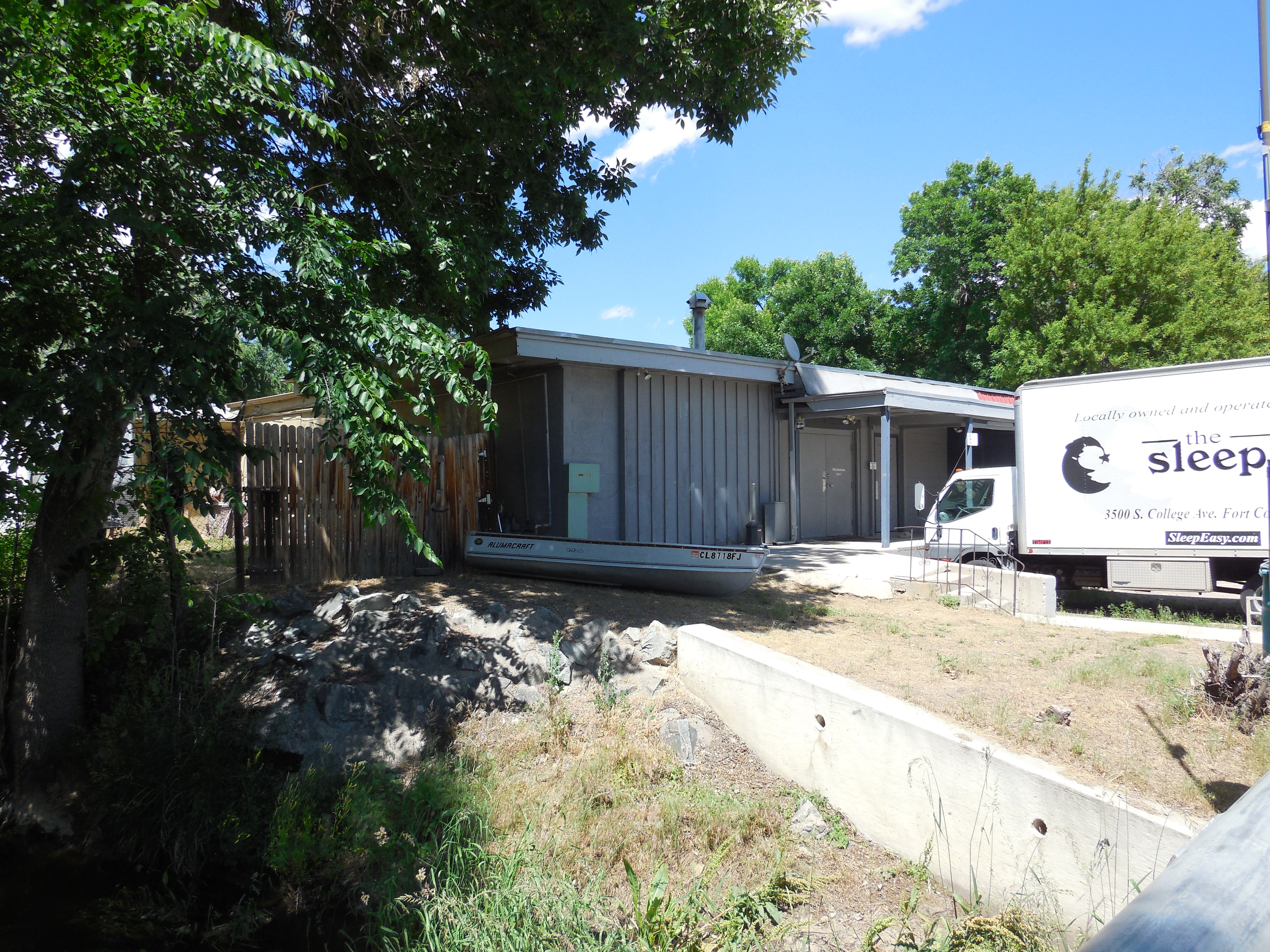
All's recording studio, The Blasting Room, in Fort Collins, Colorado

Using money from their Interscope contract, the band members designed and built their own recording studio, The Blasting Room, with the help of Egerton's father, Dan O'Reilly. "[That] was the single smartest thing we probably ever did, really", said Egerton. "Bill and I had thrown around the idea of having a studio forever, because by then any time we were home, we were recording Big Drill Car or Chemical People. We were always recording somebody, so we really wanted a place where we could refine our skills that way. We read some books and tried to learn what we could about how to lay the place out, and we actually built the place ourselves."

== Writing ==
I think the Pummel record, for whatever it's worth, is a really cool record, because I think it's one of the few in the All or Descendents catalog that's very dark and angry. I think it's an anomaly, and I'm not sure where that's all coming from, but boy. We were very much in control of what we were doing. We had control over virtually every aspect that was important.

— Karl Alvarez

As with their prior records, all four band members contributed to the songwriting of Pummel. The album displayed a darker, angrier edge than most of the band's prior work. "It could possibly be our least poppy-sounding", said Stevenson. "It's very hard." "If you've been listening to the last All albums, you could tell that we were pointing in this direction anyhow," said Alvarez, "and I think there's some staggeringly un-commercial songs on this record—songs like 'Uncle Critic' and 'Hetero', which don't fit into the cutesy-pie-punk routine that the radio's so enamored with right now. But we've always done stuff that might be considered more commercial than a lot of our peers have done, because we have a certain regard for pop construction and harmonies and things like that."

== Recording ==
Pummel was recorded in October and November 1994, and was the first album recorded at The Blasting Room. Stevenson and Egerton produced the album, and engineered the recording sessions with John Hampton and Brent DeRocher. Eric Fletrich, Jason Livermore, and Jeffery Reed served as assistant engineers. The recordings were mixed by Michael Barbiero at Ardent Studios in Memphis, Tennessee, and mastered by Dave Collins at A&M Mastering. Egerton was excited to have Barbiero mix the album: "[he] had done Appetite for Destruction. He had done all these huge records. So that worked out well". A cover version of the 1967 song "Ruby, Don't Take Your Love to Town" was recorded during the sessions but left off of the album; it was released in 1997 on a split record with the band Judge Nothing, published by Thick Records.

== Release and promotion ==
In terms of [Interscope's] promotion, I think they didn't understand our audience very well at all. But it was the '90s; they were just throwing money at anyone who could hold a guitar. It was weird for us because suddenly all these doors were open. That was the last boom time the major labels shall see, so we got our licks in and I think we got out of it a lot lighter than a lot of other people.

— Karl Alvarez

Pummel was released April 11, 1995, through Interscope Records. A music video was released for "Million Bucks", and the band performed the song on the May 22, 1995, episode of Late Night with Conan O'Brien. They also performed "Long Distance" on the June 18, 1995, episode of 120 Minutes. However, the album did not sell enough copies to reach the Billboard charts. The band later remarked that they felt Interscope did a poor job of promoting the record. "[Interscope] bought The Blasting Room's equipment", said Stevenson. "Other than that, though, we didn't really have much involvement with them. I don't know if we were below their radar, really, and they didn't care that much. It didn't feel like we were on a major." As a result, All left Interscope and signed to independent label Epitaph Records, making Pummel their only major label album. Stevenson said in 1996:

Interscope gave us, like, a million bucks last year, and we built a recording studio, and then they basically didn't do too well with Pummel, so we bailed out and took our recording studio with us. I think the thing they didn't realize, and we did realize, is that it's easier to market some of those mall punk bands because you've got the fashion that's there with it; you know, the nice hairdos and the fake British accents. But with All or Descendents, it's basically these ugly dork people playing music. They thought they could market it because it was the right music, but the fact of it is that the music doesn't have anything to do with anything, really. We knew that.

After Pummel, the band reunited with singer Milo Aukerman of their precursor group, the Descendents (the Descendents had changed their name to All upon Aukerman's departure from the band in 1987). They decided to operate as two bands, performing with Aukerman as the Descendents and with Chad Price as All. Their next album was the Descendents' Everything Sucks (1996), followed by All's Mass Nerder (1998).

== Reception ==
Michael Roberts of Westword said that Pummel was "no departure for the musicians, but given the changing tenor of the times, it sounds newly accessible—probably the most immediately attractive All album yet." Stephen Thomas Erlewine of AllMusic called it "no great step forward, featuring the same punk-pop grind that their cult has grown to love in the band's decade-long existence. If anything, Pummel displays signs of inertia, as the group not only fails to develop their music, but they are incapable of capturing the raw energy of their independent records."

The song "Hetero", with lyrics written by Stevenson, drew some negative remarks. Reviewing the band's May 25, 1995, performance at Irving Plaza, Jon Pareles of The New York Times called it "openly homophobic, and it goes on to describe the narrator as a 'cigarette smokin', seal killin' redneck.'" Jon Ginoli, openly gay frontman of the queercore band Pansy Division, called it "an obviously anti-gay backlash song. In it [Stevenson] proclaims himself as a normal straight guy who can't get laid, and he's blaming gay guys. What? In his words, 'the only way you're cool is if you're gay or dead'. Huh? 'Maybe I should pierce my butt or get a few tattoos / Maybe I should wear a dress and be a homo like you / Normal, hetero, straight guy / Yeah that's right, I'm a straight, normal, girl fuckin', coffee drinkin', titty suckin', cigarette smokin', seal killin', redneck-ass bastard from hell'. Hmm, I don't think the gay guys are to blame for that [...] Hearing the song, it was hard not to take it personally [...] At the same time I felt sad for the guy, who so obviously appeared threatened by gay people having more visibility and acceptance."

== Track listing ==
No.	Title	Writer(s)	Length
1.	"Self-Righteous"	Karl Alvarez	1:38
2.	"Million Bucks"	Bill Stevenson (music and lyrics), Alvarez (music)	2:07
3.	"Uncle Critic"	Stevenson (lyrics), Stephen Egerton (music)	0:54
4.	"Miranda"	Chad Price	2:33
5.	"Not Easy"	Price	2:55
6.	"Long Distance"	Stevenson	3:05
7.	"Stalker"	Price	3:47
8.	"Button It"	Price	0:50
9.	"This World"	Alvarez	2:17
10.	"Gettin' There"	Alvarez	1:17
11.	"Breakin' Up"	Stevenson	2:45
12.	"On Foot"	Egerton	2:23
13.	"Broken"	Alvarez	3:12
14.	"Hetero"	Stevenson (lyrics), Egerton (music)	1:32
15.	"Black Sky"	Stevenson	3:24
16.	"Away She Went" (Bonus Track; Japanese release.)	Stevenson	2:05

== Personnel ==
Band

- Karl Alvarez – bass guitar
- Stephen Egerton – guitar, producer, recording engineer
- Chad Price – vocals
- Bill Stevenson – drums, producer, recording engineer

Production

- Michael Barbiero – mixing engineer
- Dave Collins – mastering
- Brent DeRocher – recording engineer
- Eric Fletrich – assistant engineer
- John Hampton – recording engineer
- Jason Livermore – assistant engineer
- Jeffrey Reed – assistant engineer
