= Allroy for Prez =

- The EP's cover depicts the band's Allroy character campaigning with the slogan "A vote for All is a vote for All".

EP by All
- Released: 1988
- Recorded: March 1988
- Studio: Third Wave Recording, Torrance, California
- Genre: Punk rock
- Length: 20:43
- Label: Cruz (CRZ-004)
- Producer: Bill Stevenson

All chronology
Allroy Sez (1988)	Allroy for Prez (1988)	Allroy's Revenge (1989)

Professional ratings
Review scores
Source	Rating
Allmusic	3.5/5 stars

Allroy for Prez is an EP by the American punk rock band All, released in 1988 through Cruz Records. Released the same year as the band's debut album, Allroy Sez, the EP was All's final release with their original singer Dave Smalley.

== Background ==
The EP was recorded in March 1988 at Third Wave Recording in Torrance, California with recording engineer Richard Andrews, who had worked with the band since 1986. Guitarist Stephen Egerton served as assistant engineer, while drummer Bill Stevenson served as record producer. The recordings were mixed that August. Bassist Karl Alvarez illustrated the cover, which features the band's Allroy character campaigning for President of the United States, timed to coincide with the 1988 U.S. presidential election. The back cover includes "The Allstitution", listing decrees such as "Freedom of Espresso", "Lower the Unenjoyment Level", and "Allistic Legislation".

Allroy for Prez was released through Cruz Records as a 6-song EP and an 8-song cassette and CD, the latter two including the two tracks from the "Just Perfect" single released earlier in the year: a remixed version of "Just Perfect" from the band's debut album, Allroy Sez, and "Wishing Well", which had been recorded during the Allroy Sez sessions but was not included on the album.

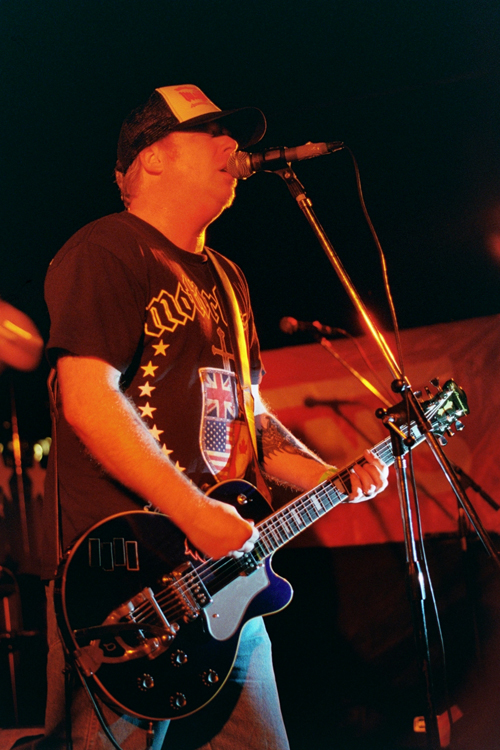
Allroy for Prez was All's last release with their original singer, Dave Smalley.

Allroy for Prez was All's last release with their original singer, Dave Smalley, who quit the band after its release because he could not keep up with their busy touring schedule. "When I quit, it was because I was really burned out", he later recalled. I couldn't cut the touring mustard." "I was on the road for nine and a half months in one year, and I remember we were doing laundry and Bill started talking about the next tour. We were gonna get back in two more weeks, and he was already planning the next one and the next recording, and he looked at me and said 'You're not staying, are you?'" "We just went out and out and out and out and out and out," remembered Stevenson, "and I just think he did what any smart person would do and moved on." Smalley went on to found Down by Law and reunite with his pre-All bands DYS and Dag Nasty. He was replaced in All's lineup by Scott Reynolds.

== Reception ==
Jack Rabid of Allmusic gave Allroy for Prez three and a half stars out of five, calling it "so much better [than Allroy Sez] that it makes its predecessor sound stillborn." He praised "Skin Deep" as "one of the finest songs of this band's first nine years. Whopping hooks, great backing vocals, and even sharp lyrics on plastic people, L.A.'s biggest export. Of the rest, only the jerky instrumental 'Son-O-Qua' is skippable; 'Skin Deep' and the other five tracks clock in with some of the meatiest pop since...well, since the Descendents' previous LP."

== Track listing ==
EP version

Side A
No.	Title	Writer(s)	Length
1.	"Skin Deep"	Karl Alvarez	1:58
2.	"Wrong Again"	Dave Smalley	2:49
3.	"I Hate to Love"	Alvarez	1:51

Side B
No.	Title	Writer(s)	Length
4.	"Son-O-Qua"	Stephen Egerton	3:02
5.	"Postage"	Bill Stevenson	2:09
6.	"Daveage"	Smalley	2:53

CD and cassette versions

No.	Title	Writer(s)	Length
1.	"Just Perfect" (remix)	Bill Stevenson	2:59
2.	"Skin Deep"	Karl Alvarez	1:58
3.	"Wrong Again"	Dave Smalley	2:49
4.	"I Hate to Love"	Alvarez	1:51
5.	"Wishing Well"	Smalley	3:02
6.	"Son-O-Qua"	Stephen Egerton	3:02
7.	"Postage"	Stevenson	2:09
8.	"Daveage"	Smalley	2:53

== Personnel ==
Band

- Karl Alvarez – bass guitar, cover drawings
- Stephen Egerton – guitar, assistant engineer
- Dave Smalley – vocals
- Bill Stevenson – drums, producer

Production

- Richard Andrews – engineer
