= Problematic (album) =

- The album's cover depicts the band's Allroy character in outer space doing battle with aliens shaped like musical notes.

Studio album by All
- Released: June 6, 2000
- Recorded: January–February 2000
- Studio: The Blasting Room (Fort Collins, Colorado)
- Genres: Punk rock, hardcore punk
- Length: 34:45
- Label: Epitaph
- Producers: Bill Stevenson, Stephen Egerton, Jason Livermore

All chronology
All (1999)	Problematic (2000)	Live Plus One (2001)

Professional ratings
Review scores
Source	Rating
AllMusic	4/5 stars
Alternative Press	4/5 stars
CMJ	Favorable
Melody Maker	4/5 stars
Ox-Fanzine	Favorable

Problematic is the eighth and final studio album by American hardcore punk band All. It was recorded at the band's own recording studio, The Blasting Room in Fort Collins, Colorado, and released on Epitaph Records in 2000.

== Track listing ==
No.	Title	Writer(s)	Length
1.	"Carry You"	Karl Alvarez	2:00
2.	"She Broke My Dick"	Bill Stevenson (lyrics), Stephen Egerton (music)	0:43
3.	"Better Than That"	Alvarez	2:03
4.	"www.sara"	Stevenson (music and lyrics), Egerton (music)	2:21
5.	"Roir"	Alvarez (lyrics), Egerton (music)	1:10
6.	"What Are You For?"	Alvarez	2:11
7.	"Stupid Kind of Love"	Stevenson, Egerton	1:56
8.	"Alive"	Chad Price	1:50
9.	"Real People"	Stevenson	2:17
10.	"Lock 'Em Away"	Alvarez	1:48
11.	"Teresa"	Stevenson	1:41
12.	"I Want Out"	Egerton, Stevenson	0:51
13.	"Crucifiction"	Alvarez	2:16
14.	"The Skin"	Alvarez	2:19
15.	"Nothin' to Live For"	Stevenson, Egerton	1:14
16.	"Never Took"	Price	2:13
17.	"Make Believe"	Stevenson	3:08
18.	"Drive Away"	Price	2:35
Total length:			34:45

== Credits ==
All

- Chad Price – Vocals
- Bill Stevenson – Drums
- Karl Alvarez – Bass guitar, vocals
- Stephen Egerton – Guitar

Production

- Bill Stevenson – Producer, engineer, mixing
- Jason Livermore – Producer, engineer, mastering, mixing
- Stephen Egerton – Producer, engineer

Artwork

- Chris Shary – Cover art
