= Mass Nerder =

- The album's cover, drawn by Chris Shary, marked the return of the band's Allroy character who had been absent from their covers since 1990.

Studio album by All
- Released: May 5, 1998
- Recorded: December 1997 – January 1998
- Genre: Hardcore punk
- Length: 30:04
- Label: Epitaph (E-86531)
- Producer: Bill Stevenson, Stephen Egerton, Jason Livermore

All chronology
Pummel (1995)	Mass Nerder (1998)	All (1999)

Professional ratings
Review scores
Source	Rating
Allmusic	2.5/5 stars
Pitchfork	7/10

Mass Nerder is the seventh album by the punk rock band All. It was released on Epitaph Records in 1998.

== Background and recording ==
In mid 1996, All began working on their next, then untitled, studio album. At the same time, Milo Aukerman was considering to permanently reunite the Descendents, and was beginning sessions for the band's next album Everything Sucks. All joined Aukerman on the sessions, where they played demos of the Descendents' songs. Price and Aukerman then split the album in two and took turns picking songs for Everything Sucks or Mass Nerder. The band recorded a total of 18 tracks for the new album, of which only four ("Vida Blue," "Silence," "Until Then" and "Good As My Word") would make it onto Mass Nerder. Nine other tracks ("Everything Sux," "I'm the One," "Sick-O-Me," "Caught," "When I Get Old," "She Loves Me," "Hateful Notebook," "I Won't Let Me" and "Thank You") were covers of songs from Everything Sucks, while the remaining five were left off Mass Nerder. As a result, Price wrote twelve completely new songs in 1996–97. "Silence," originally chosen by Aukerman, was intended to be sung as a duet with Price, but was ultimately given to All before Everything Sucks was finished.

Mass Nerder was finally recorded at The Blasting Room, in Fort Collins, Colorado between December 1997 and January 1998. Producer duties were handled by drummer Bill Stevenson, guitarist Stephen Egerton and Jason Livermore, all of whom would engineer and mix the sessions.

== Track listing ==
No.	Title	Lyrics	Music	Length
1.	"World's on Heroin"	Bill Stevenson	Stephen Egerton, Stevenson	1:59
2.	"I'll Get There"	Stevenson, Karl Alvarez	Alvarez	2:23
3.	"Life on the Road"	Stevenson	Stevenson	0:35
4.	"Fairweather Friend"	Alvarez	Alvarez	1:40
5.	"Perfection"	Stevenson, Egerton	Egerton	1:37
6.	"Greedy"	Stevenson	Stevenson, Egerton	0:46
7.	"Until I Say So"	Chad Price	Price	2:53
8.	"Think the World"	Stevenson, Alvarez	Alvarez	1:20
9.	"Honey Peeps"	Price	Price	2:06
10.	"Refrain"	Price	Price	2:36
11.	"Silly Me"	Stevenson	Stevenson	2:21
12.	"Romantic Junkie"	Stevenson, Alvarez	Egerton	1:29
13.	"Vida Blue"	Alvarez	Alvarez	2:17
14.	"Until Then"	Stevenson, Alvarez	Stevenson	1:55
15.	"Good As My Word"	Egerton, Stevenson	Egerton	1:43
16.	"Silence"	Price	Price	2:24

== Personnel ==
Personnel per booklet.

All

- Chad Price – vocals
- Bill Stevenson – drums
- Karl Alvarez – bass guitar, vocals
- Stephen Egerton – guitar

Additional musician

- Milo Aukerman – backing vocals

Production

- Bill Stevenson – producer, engineer, mixing
- Stephen Egerton – producer, engineer, mixing
- Jason Livermore – producer, engineer, mixing
