= Chad Price =

American singer

Chad Price is the lead singer for the melodic punk band ALL and alt-country band Drag the River. As of 2018, he is the lead singer for A Vulture Wake.

He joined ALL in 1993 as the band's third singer, after Dave Smalley and Scott Reynolds. He has appeared on the four most recent studio albums, as well as one live album. He is officially still a member of the band, although Scott Reynolds has been joining the band on certain live dates.

In 1996, while still active with ALL, Price formed Drag The River with Jon Snodgrass. Drag The River announced a break in 2007, although they were together again by 2008.

On October 29, 2009, Price released his first solo record Smile Sweet Face. The following month, Price and Snodgrass performed 10 shows through Texas, Georgia, Tennessee, Alabama, and Florida as part of The Revival Tour In March 2010, Price released a split with Rocky Votolato through Suburban Home Records.

On August 13, 2018, Price released another solo record One Week on Joey Cape's One Week Records.

Price has been a vegan since 2015. He was a vegetarian prior to becoming vegan.

== Discography ==
=== With ALL ===
- "Guilty" single (1993)
- "Shreen" single (1993)
- Breaking Things (1993)
- Pummel (1995)
- Mass Nerder (1998)
- All (Best of album) (1999)
- Problematic (2000)
- Live Plus One (2001)

=== With Drag The River ===
- Hobo's Demo's (2000)
- Closed (2002)
- Live at the Starlight (2002)
- at the Green Door LP (2003)
- Chicken Demo's (2004)
- Hey Buddies... (2004)
- Live at the Starlight/at the Green Door (double cd repress) (2000)
- ...a way with women 7 inch (2004)
- A Shame - Beautiful & Damned 7 inch (space mix) (2004)
- It's Crazy (2006)
- You Can't Live This Way (2008)
- Bad At Breaking Up (2009)
- 2010 Demons (2010)

=== With A Vulture Wake ===
- The Appropriate Level of Outrage (2018)
- Fall Prey E.P. (2018)
- Kingdom E.P. (2022)

=== Solo ===
- Smile Sweet Face (2009)
- One Week (2018)

=== Miscellaneous ===
- Sang backup vocals on The Ataris Look Forward To Failure EP
- Sang backup vocals on the Rise Against albums Revolutions per Minute, The Sufferer and the Witness, Endgame, and Nowhere Generation
- Sang backup vocals on The Descendents Everything Sucks album
