= Cruz Records =

American record label

- Founded: 1987
- Founder: Greg Ginn
- Country of origin: United States

Cruz Records was an offshoot record label of SST Records, owned by the Black Flag guitarist Greg Ginn. The label was founded in 1987. Its roster consisted mainly of pop punk and grunge bands, along with Ginn's solo records. The label has remained inactive since the mid-1990s although the pieces of its back catalog that are still in print are still available through SST Records.

== Artists ==
- ALL
- Chemical People
- Greg Ginn
- Jack Endino
- Skin Yard
- Big Drill Car
- TonyALL
- Goodbye Harry
- Endino's Earthworm
- Rig

== Catalogue ==
Catalogue number	Year	Artist	Title
CRZ 001	1988	ALL	Allroy Sez
CRZ 002	1988	Chemical People	So Sexist!
CRZ 003	1988	ALL	Just Perfect
CRZ 004	1988	ALL	Allroy for Prez
CRZ 005	1989	ALL	She's My Ex
CRZ 006	1989	ALL	Allroy's Revenge
CRZ 007	1989	Chemical People	Ten Fold Hate
CRZ 008	1989	Big Drill Car	Album Type Thing
CRZ 009	1990	Skin Yard	Fist Sized Chunks
CRZ 010	1989	ALL	Trailblazer
CRZ 011	1990	ALL	Allroy Saves
CRZ 012	Unreleased	Various	Viva Cruz
CRZ 013	1990	Chemical People	Do the Right Thing
CRZ 014	1990	Big Drill Car	Small Block
CRZ 015	1992	Skin Yard	Skin Yard
CRZ 016	1991	TonyALL	New Girl, Old Story
CRZ 017	1991	Skin Yard	1000 Smiling Knuckles
CRZ 018	1991	Big Drill Car	Batch
CRZ 019	1991	Chemical People	Angels 'N' Devils
CRZ 020	1991	Chemical People	Soundtracks
CRZ 021	1992	Endino's Earthworm	Endino's Earthworm
CRZ 022	1992	ALL	Percolater
CRZ 023	1992	Chemical People	Chemical People
CRZ 024	1992	ALL	Dot
CRZ 025	1992	Chemical People	Let It Go
CRZ 026	1993	Skin Yard	Undertow
CRZ 027	1993	Skin Yard	Inside the Eye
CRZ 028	1993	Greg Ginn	Payday
CRZ 029	1993	Greg Ginn	Getting Even
CRZ 030	1993	ALL	Shreen
CRZ 031	1993	ALL	Breaking Things
CRZ 032	1993	Greg Ginn	Dick
CRZ 033	1994	ALL	Guilty
CRZ 034	1994	Greg Ginn	Don't Tell Me
CRZ 035	1994	Rig	Belly To The Ground
CRZ 036	1994	Greg Ginn	Let It Burn (Because I Don't Live There Anymore)
CRZ 037	1995	Goodbye Harry	Food Stamp B-BQ
CRZ 038	1996	Goodbye Harry	I Can Smoke
CRZ 039	1996	Rig	King Of The Soft Serve (With A Semi)
CRZ 040	1997	Chemical People	Arpeggio Motorcade

== See also ==
- List of record labels
