= Bill Stevenson (American musician) =

American musician

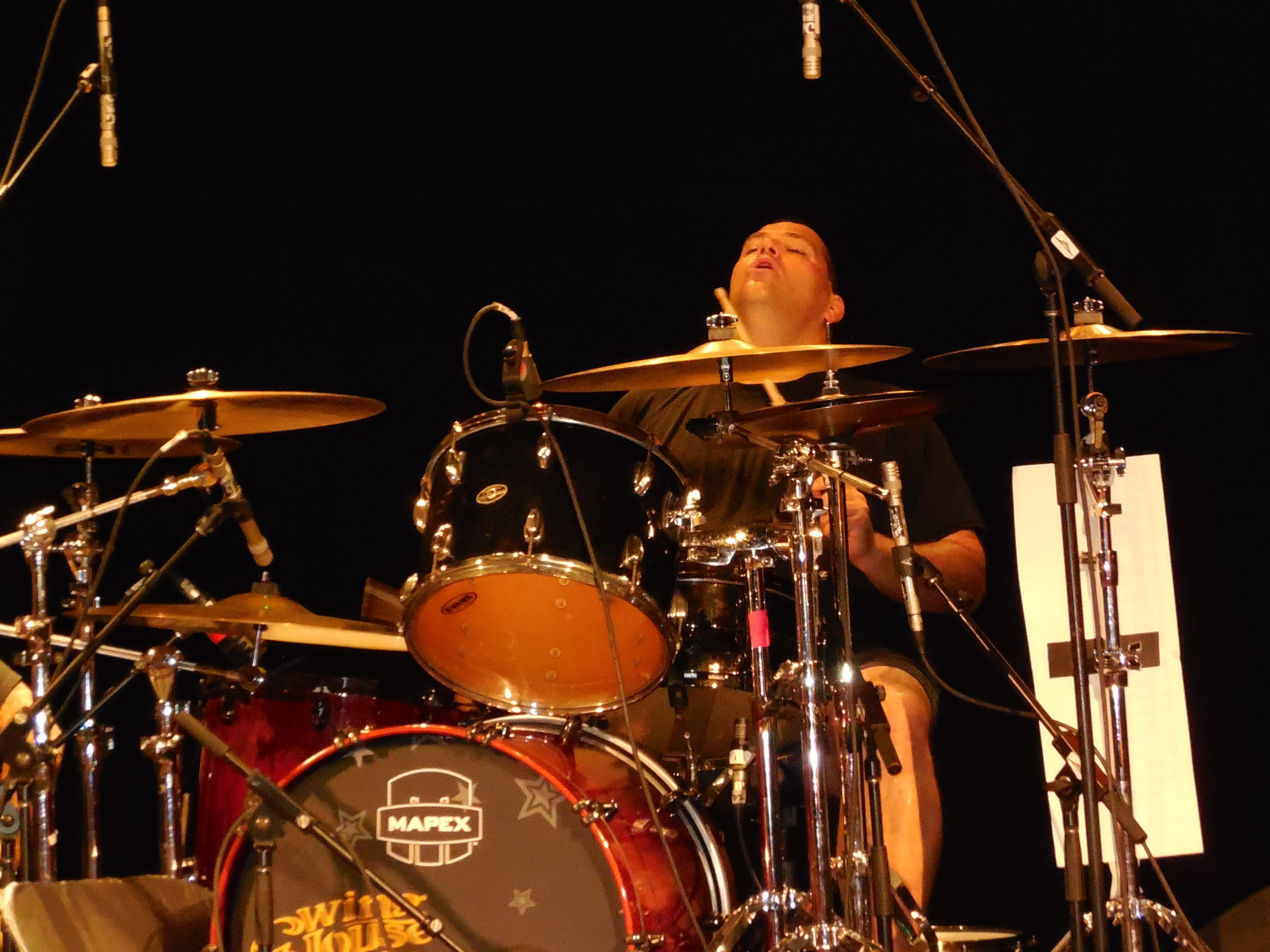
- Stevenson performing with the Descendents in 2014

Background information
- Born: John William Stevenson; September 10, 1963 (age 62); Torrance, California, U.S.
- Genres: Punk rock, hardcore punk
- Occupations: Musician, songwriter, producer, engineer
- Instruments: Drums, percussion
- Years active: 1978–present
- Labels: Orca, New Alliance, SST, Cruz, Interscope, Epitaph, Fat Wreck Chords, Rise
- Member of: Descendents; All; Only Crime
- Formerly of: Black Flag; The Lemonheads; The Last; The Nig-Heist; Higley (band)

John William Stevenson (born September 10, 1963) is an American musician, songwriter, and record producer. He is the drummer, main songwriter, and only constant member of the California punk rock group Descendents since its inception. In late December 1981, he played a few concerts with the hardcore punk band Black Flag because their drummer, Robo, was detained in England after a tour there. He continued to tour with Black Flag and appeared on five of their studio albums, including the highly influential My War, until being dismissed in 1985. After this, he focused his attention on Descendents and played with the band until lead singer Milo Aukerman left in 1987. After Milo's departure, Bill and the other members of Descendents, Karl Alvarez and Stephen Egerton, recruited singer Dave Smalley of Dag Nasty and formed ALL. ALL went on to have two more singers, Scott Reynolds (1989–1993) and Chad Price (1993–present). Aukerman came back for the 1996 album Everything Sucks, the 2004 album Cool to Be You, 2016's Hypercaffium Spazzinate and the newest album 9th and Walnut. All and Descendents continue to tour between Stevenson's and Aukerman's respective careers as a recording engineer and a biochemist. Stevenson was born in Torrance, California and attended Mira Costa High School, with fellow members of the Descendents.

Stevenson and record producer Jason Livermore are the founders of the recording studio The Blasting Room in Fort Collins, Colorado. Currently, Stevenson is involved in Russ Rankin's side project Only Crime with former members of Gwar and Converge.

In 2005, he became a member of instrumental group The Mag Seven, and produced the group's album. He also played with The Lemonheads from 2005 to 2007, appearing on their 2006 self titled album, which he also helped produce.

Stevenson produced As I Lay Dying's 2012 album Awakened, the 2012 NOFX album Self Entitled as well as Rise Against's seventh and ninth studio albums, The Black Market and Nowhere Generation, released July 15, 2014 and June 4, 2021 respectively.

One of Stevenson's most recent works was the production of Frenzal Rhomb's tenth studio album The Cup of Pestilence, released April 7, 2023.

== Early life ==
Bill Stevenson (birth name; John William Stevenson) was born on September 10, 1963. Stevenson grew up mostly with his father, Steve Stevenson. He describes his father as a cold man but present for him. Steve Stevenson worked two jobs and was out of the house 22 hours a day. Steve would come to give Bill food and put him to bed. Around the age of fourteen or fifteen, Stevenson started working for Keith Morris' father as a fisherman. He attended Mira Costa High School where he met his friends and future bandmates of Descendents.

== Career ==
Stevenson is an original member of the Descendents forming in 1978. The Descendents put out a single called "Ride the Wild / It's a Hectic World" in 1979. In 1982 they put out their first album Milo Goes to College. After the album, singer Milo Aukerman went to college, the band played rarely, so Stevenson joined Black Flag. He left Black Flag in 1985 to reform the Descendents. The Descendents became All in 1988 after Aukerman left once again. The Descendents would form again from 1996 to 1997 and then in 2002, before going on hiatus. From 2003 to 2007, Stevenson played in smaller bands until All played shows again in 2008. In 2010, the Descendents reformed again.

== Personal life ==
Stevenson has never tried recreational drugs in his life other than alcohol, which he did not drink until later in life.

In recent years, Stevenson has had some health issues. He developed a benign brain tumor around 2008, which remained for another two years before being removed. The tumor caused Stevenson to lose motivation and eventually made him gain weight. He also underwent surgery to remove a blood clot from one of his lungs. He is also a diabetic and suffers from sleep apnea. In 2010, he had a successful surgery to remove the tumor which helped him to regain his health. In 2016, Stevenson revealed he had open heart surgery.

== Selected discography ==
See also Albums produced by Bill Stevenson

- Higley – Higley (2017) Drums, producer
- Descendents – Hypercaffium Spazzinate – (2016) Drums, producer, engineer
- The Last – Danger (2013) Drums
- Only Crime – Virulence (2007) Drums, producer and engineer
- The Lemonheads – The Lemonheads (2006) Drums, producer
- Descendents – Cool to Be You (2004) Drums, producer, backing vocals
- Descendents – 'Merican (2004) Drums, producer, Backing Vocals
- Only Crime – To The Nines (2004) Drums, producer, engineer, mixing, and mastering
- All/Descendents – Live Plus One [2 CD Split] (2001) Drums, producer
- All – Problematic (2000) Drums, producer
- All – ALL (1999) Drums, producer
- All – Mass Nerder (1998) Drums, producer
- Descendents – Everything Sucks (1996) Drums, producer
- All – Pummel (1995) Drums, producer
- All – Breaking Things (1993) Drums, producer
- All – Percolater (1992) Drums, producer
- Descendents – Somery (1991) Drums, producer, Artwork
- All – Allroy Saves (1990) Drums, producer, backing vocals
- All – Trailblazer (1990) Drums, producer
- Black Flag – I Can See You (1989) Drums
- All – Allroy's Revenge (1989) Drums, producer
- Descendents – Hallraker: Live! (1989) Drums, producer
- All – Allroy for Prez (1988) Drums, producer
- All – Allroy Sez (1988) Drums, producer
- Black Flag – Wasted...Again (1987) Drums
- Descendents – Liveage! (1987) Drums, producer
- Descendents – ALL (1987) Drums, producer
- Descendents – Enjoy! (1986) Drums, engineer, backing vocals
- Descendents – I Don't Want to Grow Up (1985) Drums, engineer, backing vocals
- Minuteflag – MinuteFlag (1985) Drums
- Black Flag – In My Head (1985) Drums, producer
- Black Flag – The Process of Weeding Out (1985) Drums, producer
- Black Flag – Loose Nut (1985) Drums, producer, backing vocals
- Black Flag – Live '84 (1984) Drums, mixing
- Black Flag – Slip It In (1984) Drums, producer
- Black Flag – Family Man (1984) Drums, engineer
- Black Flag – My War (1984) Drums, producer
- Black Flag – TV Party (1982) Drums
- Descendents – Milo Goes to College (1982) Drums, backing vocals
- Descendents – Fat (1981) Drums, backing vocals
- Descendents – Ride the Wild/It's a Hectic World single (1979) Drums, producer
