= Scott Reynolds (singer) =

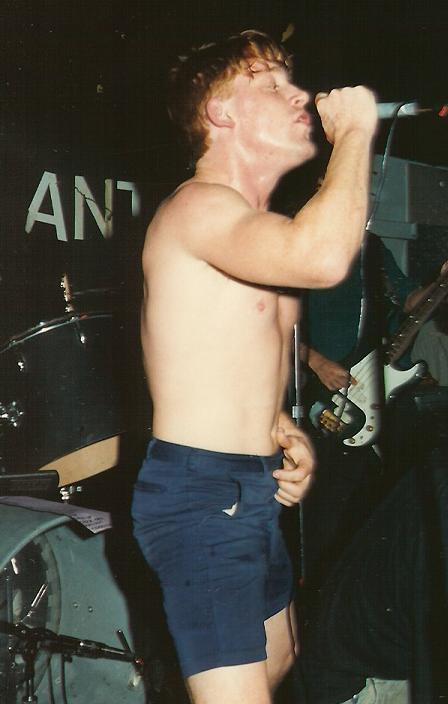
- Reynolds performing with All in 1989/90

Background information
- Born: Scott William Reynolds; January 18, 1964 (age 61); Fredonia, New York
- Origin: Los Angeles
- Genres: Punk rock
- Occupation: Musician
- Instrument(s): Vocals, Guitar
- Years active: 1989–present

Scott Reynolds is an American punk rock vocalist from Fredonia, New York, known mainly for his work with the band ALL from 1989 to 1993. He has also performed with such bands as The Pavers and Goodbye Harry.

== Time with ALL ==
Reynolds was pop-punk band ALL's second lead singer, replacing Dave Smalley in 1989. He recorded and toured with the group extensively from 1989 - 1993. His songwriting contributions with All were notable; his Dot off 1993's Percolater was the group's first single not written by drummer Bill Stevenson. Reynolds left ALL in 1993 reportedly due to differences in the band regarding touring schedules.

All formed in suburban Los Angeles in 1987 when Milo Aukerman, the lead singer of The Descendents, left to pursue a graduate degree in biochemistry, forcing the band into a hiatus. The remaining members, guitarist Stephen Egerton, bassist Karl Alvarez, and drummer Bill Stevenson decided to carry on as a band, adopting the title of the Descendents’ last studio album, All, as their official moniker.

Enlisting former Dag Nasty and DYS singer Dave Smalley on vocals, All released their first two albums in 1988: Allroy Sez and the EP Allroy for Prez (both distributed by Cruz Records) to critical acclaim. In 1989, Smalley left the band, and new vocalist Scott Reynolds joined. With Reynolds, All released four more albums: 1989 Allroy's Revenge (which included the single She's My Ex), 1990 Allroy Saves, 1992 Percolater, and the 1990 live album Trailblazer.

== Post ALL ==
After ALL, he moved to Washington State and started the band Goodbye Harry. Goodbye Harry put out two albums, Food Stamp BBQ and I Can Smoke. In the mid-1990s Reynolds moved to the Buffalo, NY area, where he formed the punk band The Pavers. The Pavers released two albums, two EPs, a live radio cd, and a variety of split EPs. He also fronted the metal punk band, Bonesaw Romance. In the early 2000s, frustrated with major label non-response to music that was lauded by fans and critics, he moved from Buffalo, NY to Austin, TX.

In Austin, Scott recorded an album of more acoustic, lounge-type songs under the moniker Scott Reynolds and the Steaming Beast, and worked with former All band-mate, guitarist Stephen Egerton on another project, 40Engine.

Between October 2009 and February 2010, Scott produced and sang back up vocals on the album "Second to All" for local Austin punk band The Butts. The album was mastered by former All band-mate, guitarist Stephen Egerton and was released in early 2011.

In 2017, Reynolds moved back to the Buffalo area, and in 2021 he released his first solo acoustic record, Chihuahua in Buffalo. Today he plays solo shows with his nylon-stringed guitar and his trusty pet chihuahua JB (short for Justin Bieber) in tow.

=== Reunion ===
On January 26, 2008, Egerton, Stevenson, and Alvarez reunited with Scott Reynolds to play a set of All songs as an opening act for Drag the River at the Aggie in Fort Collins. In mid-April of that year, the band announced that they would be reuniting once again with Reynolds for Chicago, Illinois's 'Riot Fest' on October 12. They performed at the Congress Theater in Chicago, playing for over an hour before Chicago police shut down the show.

Additionally, ALL performed two warm up shows; one in Japan in July 2008 and the other at the Democratic National Convention in Denver, Colorado on August 29, 2008. The DNC show was cut short and the band completed an additional set that evening at the Three Kings Bar in downtown Denver, CO.

In an interview with RiotFest.org, Scott Reynolds does not rule out the possibility of writing new material but sets three conditions that need to be present: People want to hear new music, he feels the need to create, and the "bro" factor between the bandmates needs to be there.

== Discography ==
- All - Allroy's Revenge - 1989
- All - She's My Ex - 1989
- All - Allroy Saves - 1990
- All - Trailblazer:Live - 1990
- TonyAll - New Girl, Old Story - 1991
- All - Dot EP - 1992
- All - Percolater - 1992
- Goodbye Harry - Food Stamp B-B-Q - 1995
- Goodbye Harry - I Can Smoke - 1996
- ALL - S/T - 1999
- The Pavers - Local 1500 - 1999
- The Pavers - Beautiful (EP) - 2002
- The Pavers - Wrecking Ball (EP) - 2002
- The Pavers - Taco or Tambourine (EP) - 2002
- The Pavers - Return to the Island of No Return - 2002
- The Pavers - No Show, Prefab Unison (Split EP)- 2003
- Fastgato - Feral - 2003
- Bonesaw Romance - S/T - 2006
- Scott Reynolds - Livin' the Dream - 2007
- Scott Reynolds and the Steaming Beast - Adventure Boy - 2008
- 40 Engine - TBA 2008
- Scott Reynolds - Stupid World - 2014
- Scott Reynolds - Chihuahua in Buffalo - 2021
- Scott Reynolds - Magic Beans & Time Machines - 2024
