= Karl Alvarez =

American bassist and songwriter

- Alvarez performing with the Descendents in 2014

Background information
- Born: Karl Matthew Alvarez; March 10, 1964 (age 62)
- Genre: Punk rock
- Occupation: Musician
- Instrument: Bass guitar
- Years active: 1980–present
- Labels: SST, Cruz, Interscope, Epitaph, Fat Wreck Chords
- Member of: Descendents, All
- Formerly of: The Lemonheads, The Last

Karl Matthew Alvarez (born March 10, 1964) is an American bassist and songwriter for both the Descendents and All, the band that resulted after the Descendents disbanded again in 1987. Alvarez joined the Descendents after the Enjoy! album from his previous bands The Massacre Guys and Bad Yodelers, and played on all of the All albums, and the Descendents albums All, Everything Sucks, Cool To Be You and Hypercaffium Spazzinate. Unlike previous Descendents bassists Tony Lombardo and Doug Carrion, who both used a pick, Alvarez plays finger style bass, and he also provides backing vocals when live (and lead vocals as heard in "Cause" on the All Live Plus One album). Since joining the band he has been a major songwriter contributing many songs to All (both the album and the band), Everything Sucks and Cool To Be You. In the summer of 2006 he joined Gypsy Punk band Gogol Bordello for part of the Van's Warped Tour and the Reading and Leeds Festivals. Alvarez currently plays guitar and sings in Endless Monster and the Vultures.

Since 2004, Alvarez has played with The Last along with Descendents and All drummer Bill Stevenson.

In 2006, Alvarez played on The Lemonheads self-titled comeback album which was released on Los Angeles' Vagrant Records.

Alvarez played with the Canadian Celtic-punk band The Real McKenzies intermittently during 2007 and from 2009 to 2010. He toured with the group and provided bass and mandolin tracks for their 2010 album Shine Not Burn.

Australian punk band Frenzal Rhomb wrote a song about Karl, on their 2011 album, Smoko At The Pet Food Factory, called "Alvarez".

Alvarez suffered a mild heart attack on August 11, 2007.
