= Good Riddance discography =

Punk band recordings

- Studio albums: 10
- Extended plays: 8
- Live albums: 1
- Compilation albums: 2
- Video albums: 1
- Music videos: 5
- Other appearances: 8

The discography of Good Riddance, a Santa Cruz, California-based hardcore punk band, consists of nine studio albums, one live album, two compilation albums, eight EPs, one video album, and five music videos.

Good Riddance was founded in 1986 by singer Russ Rankin, but did not coalesce into a functioning band until the addition of guitarist Luke Pabich several years later. With bassist Devin Quinn and drummer Rich McDermott the band released its debut EP, Gidget, in 1993 through Austin, Texas record label Little Deputy Records. Quinn left and was temporarily replaced by Tom Kennedy before Chuck Platt joined as the band's permanent bassist. Good Riddance signed to Fat Wreck Chords, releasing their debut album For God and Country and the Decoy EP in 1995. McDermott then left and was replaced by Sean Sellers for 1996's A Comprehensive Guide to Moderne Rebellion. Using several outtakes from the album sessions, Good Riddance released split EPs with Reliance, Ignite, Ill Repute, and Ensign through other record labels over the following year. Ballads from the Revolution followed in 1998, and Operation Phoenix in 1999.

Sellers left Good Riddance in late 1999, and Dave Raun of Lagwagon played drums on their 2000 EP The Phenomenon of Craving. Dave Wagenschutz of Kid Dynamite joined as the band's new drummer, debuting with them on 2001's Symptoms of a Leveling Spirit. The album marked the band's first appearance on the Billboard charts, reaching no. 32 on the Independent Albums chart. This was followed by the video documentary Exposed! 1994–1999 and a split EP with Kill Your Idols. Cover Ups, a compilation of cover versions from the band's previous releases, was released in 2002 through Lorelei Records, a label co-founded by Rankin. Wagenschutz left Good Riddance following 2003's Bound by Ties of Blood and Affection, which reached no. 47 on the Independent Albums chart, and the band slipped into a period of inactivity during which Rankin started Only Crime.

Good Riddance returned in 2006 with My Republic, with Sean Sellers back as drummer, but decided in 2007 to break up the band. Their final performance on May 27, 2007 was recorded, and released in 2008 as the live album Remain in Memory: The Final Show. The compilation album Capricorn One: Singles & Rarities was released in 2010, collecting tracks from the band's split releases and several unreleased demos. Good Riddance reunited in 2012 and released their eighth studio album, Peace in Our Time, in 2015, followed in 2019 by Thoughts and Prayers.

== Studio albums ==
Year	Album details	Peak chart positions
Year	Album details	US
Year	Album details	Independent
1995	For God and Country: Released: February 7, 1995; Label: Fat Wreck Chords (FAT 523); Formats: LP, CD	—
1996	A Comprehensive Guide to Moderne Rebellion: Released: June 4, 1996; Label: Fat Wreck Chords (FAT 539); Formats: LP, CD	—
1998	Ballads from the Revolution: Released: February 10, 1998; Label: Fat Wreck Chords (FAT 565); Formats: LP, CD	—
1999	Operation Phoenix: Released: May 4, 1999; Label: Fat Wreck Chords (FAT 587); Formats: LP, CD	—
2001	Symptoms of a Leveling Spirit: Released: July 10, 2001; Label: Fat Wreck Chords (FAT 625); Formats: LP, CD	32
2003	Bound by Ties of Blood and Affection: Released: May 20, 2003; Label: Fat Wreck Chords (FAT 654); Formats: LP, CD	47
2006	My Republic: Released: June 27, 2006; Label: Fat Wreck Chords (FAT 707); Formats: LP, CD	—
2015	Peace in Our Time: Released: April 21, 2015; Label: Fat Wreck Chords (FAT 942); Formats: LP, CD	—
2019	Thoughts and Prayers: Released: July 19, 2019; Label: Fat Wreck Chords (FAT 707); Formats: LP, CD	—
2026	Before the World Caves In: Released: March 27, 2026; Label: Fat Wreck Chords; Formats: LP, CD	
"—" denotes releases that did not chart.

== Live albums ==
Year	Album details
2008	Remain in Memory: The Final Show: Released: March 18, 2008; Label: Fat Wreck Chords (FAT 725); Format: LP, CD

== Compilation albums ==
Year	Album details
2002	Cover Ups: Released: July 2, 2002; Label: Lorelei (NAIL 4); Formats: CD
2010	Capricorn One: Singles & Rarities: Released: July 6, 2010; Label: Fat Wreck Chords (FAT 756); Format: CD

== Extended plays ==
Year	Album details
1993	Gidget: Released: 1993; Label: Little Deputy (LD 7002); Format: EP
1995	Decoy: Released: August 26, 1995; Label: Fat Wreck Chords (FAT 524); Format: EP
1996	Good Riddance / Reliance: Released: 1996; Label: Little Deputy (LD 7015); Format: EP
1996	Ignite / Good Riddance: Released: 1996; Label: Revelation (REV 053); Format: EP
1996	Good Riddance / Ill Repute: Released: 1996; Label: It's Alive; Format: EP
1997	Good Riddance / Ensign: Released: 1997; Label: Orphaned; Format: EP
2000	The Phenomenon of Craving: Released: May 23, 2000; Label: Fat Wreck Chords (FAT 611); Format: EP, CD
2001	Good Riddance / Kill Your Idols: Released: November 20, 2001; Label: Jade Tree (JT 1065); Format: EP, CD

== Video albums ==
Year	Album details
2001	Exposed! 1994–1999: Released: July 24, 2001; Label: Fat Wreck Chords (FAT 609); Format: VHS

== Music videos ==
Year	Song	Director	Album
2000	"One for the Braves"		The Phenomenon of Craving
2001	"Yesterday's Headlines"		Symptoms of a Leveling Spirit
2006	"Darkest Days"		My Republic
2015	"Dry Season"		Peace in Our Time
2015	"Disputatio"		Peace in Our Time

== Other appearances ==
The following Good Riddance songs were released on compilation albums. Some songs were later re-released on Cover Ups and Capricorn One: Singles & Rarities, as noted below. This is not an exhaustive list; songs that were first released on the band's albums, EPs, or singles are not included.

Year	Release details	Track(s)
1997	Before You Were Punk: Released: March 11, 1997; Label: Vagrant (VR 330); Format: CD	"I Melt with You"^{[I]} (originally performed by Modern English)
1997	Physical Fatness: Released: November 25, 1997; Label: Fat Wreck Chords (FAT 560); Format: CD	"Stand"^{[II]}
1998	Oldies But Goodies: Released: April 28, 1998; Label: Negative Progression (NPR 010); Format: CD	"Leader of the Pack"^{[I]} (originally performed by The Shangri-Las)
1999	Anti-Racist Action: The Benefit CD: Released: January 12, 1999; Label: Asian Man (AMR 37); Format: CD	"Feel Their Pain"^{[I]} (originally performed by Insted)
1999	Short Music for Short People: Released: June 1, 1999; Label: Fat Wreck Chords (FAT 591); Format: CD	"Overcoming Learned Behavior"^{[II]}
2001	Live Fat, Die Young: Released: March 6, 2001; Label: Fat Wreck Chords (FAT 613); Format: CD	"Always"^{[II]}
2009	Wrecktrospective: Released: December 8, 2009; Label: Fat Wreck Chords (FAT 700); Format: CD	"Flies First Class" (demo)
2013	Milo Turns 50: Released: January 7, 2013; Label: Filter; Format: music download	"Sour Grapes" (originally performed by the Descendents)

I Denotes songs that were re-released on Cover Ups.

II Denotes songs that were re-released on Capricorn One: Singles & Rarities.
