= Capricorn One: Singles & Rarities =

Compilation album by Good Riddance
- Released: July 6, 2010
- Recorded: 1993–2006 at Lumberjack Productions, Music Annex, Art of Ears, Motor Studios, and The Blasting Room
- Genre: Punk rock, pop punk, melodic hardcore, skate punk, hardcore punk
- Length: 44:56
- Label: Fat Wreck Chords (FAT 756)
- Producer: Bill Stevenson, Jason Livermore, Stephen Egerton
- Compiler: Chad Williams

Good Riddance chronology
Remain in Memory: The Final Show (2008)	Capricorn One: Singles & Rarities (2010)	Peace in Our Time (2015)

Capricorn One: Singles & Rarities is a compilation album by the Santa Cruz, California-based punk rock band Good Riddance, released through Fat Wreck Chords July 6, 2010, three years after the band's breakup. The tracks on the album span 1993 to 2006 and include songs from Good Riddance's Gidget and Decoy EPs and their split releases with Reliance, Ignite, Ill Repute, and Ensign, as well as three tracks from Fat Wreck Chords compilations and six previously unreleased demo tracks. All of the tracks were digitally remastered by Jason Livermore at The Blasting Room. The compilation is titled after the 1978 film Capricorn One, about a Mars landing hoax. The album's liner notes include Rankin's lyrics and comments on each song.

== Background ==
According to singer Russ Rankin, the idea to compile an album of Good Riddance's rare tracks came from their label, Fat Wreck Chords: "they sort of thought that it would be a cool idea, and they knew that we had done all these other projects through the years and we sort of tossed it around—Chuck [Platt], Luke [Pabich] and myself—and eventually decided that it might be kind of cool for our fans and, since we've been done for a few years and some of these songs that were not widely released, or some that were never released at all—if they saw the light of day, we thought it might be kind of cool." Rankin noted that in choosing the material for Capricorn One, tracks that were still in print through other record labels were intentionally omitted:

That part wasn't so difficult, we basically just had to go through all the songs that were unreleased, or released in a limited scope, and pick the ones that we really liked and make sure that we didn't use ones that were still in print—like we did a split seven-inch and a split CD with Kill Your Idols which was released by Jade Tree Records and that's still in print so we didn't use any of those songs. The bulk of the songs are from [Gidget,] our very first seven-inch that was ever released, which was released on Little Deputy Records out of Austin, Texas in 1993, I think, and that recording was from our first demo tape. Little Deputy basically took four songs from that demo tape and pressed 'em and then when we were demoing for our second full-length with Fat—which ended up being A Comprehensive Guide to Moderne Rebellion—we had an over-abundance of songs...songs were just pouring out of us and so we basically decided to take six songs that weren't going to be on the record, but that we still really felt good about, and do split seven-inches with other bands that we knew on labels that were owned by friends of ours and Fat gave us the "okay" to do that...so those six songs are on there as well, and a couple of out-takes from recordings from the demos that eventually got us signed to Fat as well.

Rankin noted that the band had lost track of much of its unreleased material, stating that "we're fortunate to have tracked down what we did for this release...I'm surprised that we were able to find some of this stuff, because I had no idea where it was." He wrote the album's liner notes, providing lyrics and commentary for each track on the album in order to give the songs context, since they were "sort of appearing in a vacuum" three years after the band's breakup.

== Reception ==
Gregory Heaney of Allmusic described Capricorn One as "a solid collection of skate punk jams", calling the lyrics sheet and notes by Rankin "a cherry on top". "While some of the songs may be too raw to make this a good entry point for the new fan," he commented, "longtime Good Riddance devotees will find a lot of forgotten gems to mine out of this collection."

== Track listing ==
All lyrics are written by Russ Rankin.

No.	Title	Music	Length
1.	"Stand" (from Physical Fatness, 1997)	Rankin	2:01
2.	"Class War 2000" (from Ignite / Good Riddance, 1996)	Rankin	1:41
3.	"Lame Duck Arsenal" (from Good Riddance / Ill Repute, 1996)	Rankin	2:15
4.	"Off the Wagon" (from Good Riddance / Ill Repute, 1996)	Luke Pabich	2:39
5.	"Tragic Kingdom" (previously unreleased demo, 1993)	Pabich	2:25
6.	"All Mine" (previously unreleased outtake from My Republic sessions, 2006)	Pabich	2:17
7.	"21 Guns" (from Ignite / Good Riddance, 1996)	Rankin	2:05
8.	"Always" (from Live Fat, Die Young, 2001)	Rankin	1:37
9.	"More Time" (previously unreleased demo, 1993)	Pabich	1:49
10.	"Remember When" (from Good Riddance / Reliance, 1998)	Rankin	2:05
11.	"Overcoming Learned Behavior" (from Short Music for Short People, 1999)	Rankin	0:27
12.	"Flawed" (from Good Riddance / Reliance, 1998)	Pabich	1:34
13.	"Little Man" (previously unreleased demo, 1993)	Rankin	1:59
14.	"Free" (from Decoy, 1995)	Rankin	1:57
15.	"What We Have" (from Good Riddance / Ensign, 1997)	Rankin	2:29
16.	"Me from Adam" (previously unreleased demo, 1993)	Pabich	2:10
17.	"Great Experiment" (previously unreleased outtake from My Republic sessions, 2006)	Rankin	2:15
18.	"Not So Bad" (from Gidget, 1993)	Rankin	2:35
19.	"Patriarch" (from Gidget, 1993)	Pabich	3:40
20.	"Just for Today" (from Gidget, 1993)	Rankin	1:49
21.	"Last Believer" (from Gidget, 1993)	Pabich	3:07
Total length:			44:56

== Personnel ==
=== Band ===
- Russ Rankin – lead vocals
- Luke Pabich – guitar
- Chuck Platt – bass guitar (tracks 1–4, 6–8, 10–12, 14, 15, and 17)
- Sean Sellers – drums (tracks 1–4, 6, 7, 10–12, 15, and 17)
- Tom Kennedy – bass guitar (tracks 5, 9, 13, and 16)
- Rich McDermott – drums (tracks 5, 9, 13, 14, 16, and 18–21)
- Dave Raun – drums (track 8)
- Devin Quinn – bass guitar (tracks 18–21)

=== Production ===
- Ryan Greene – recording engineer (tracks 1 and 11)
- Andy Ernst – recording engineer (tracks 2–5, 7, 9, 10, 12, 13, 15, 16)
- Bill Stevenson – producer, recording and mix engineer (tracks 6, 8, and 17)
- Jason Livermore – producer, recording and mix engineer (tracks 6, 8, and 17), mastering (all tracks)
- Stephen Egerton – producer, recording and mix engineer (track 8)
- Steve Papoutsis – recording engineer (track 14)
- Joe Logsdon – recording engineer and mix engineer (tracks 18–21)
- Tardon – transferring of tracks 2–5, 7–10, 12–16, and 18–21 from original tapes
- Chad Williams – compiling
- Pete Saporito – band photo
