= The Blasting Room =

Recording studio in Fort Collins, Colorado, US

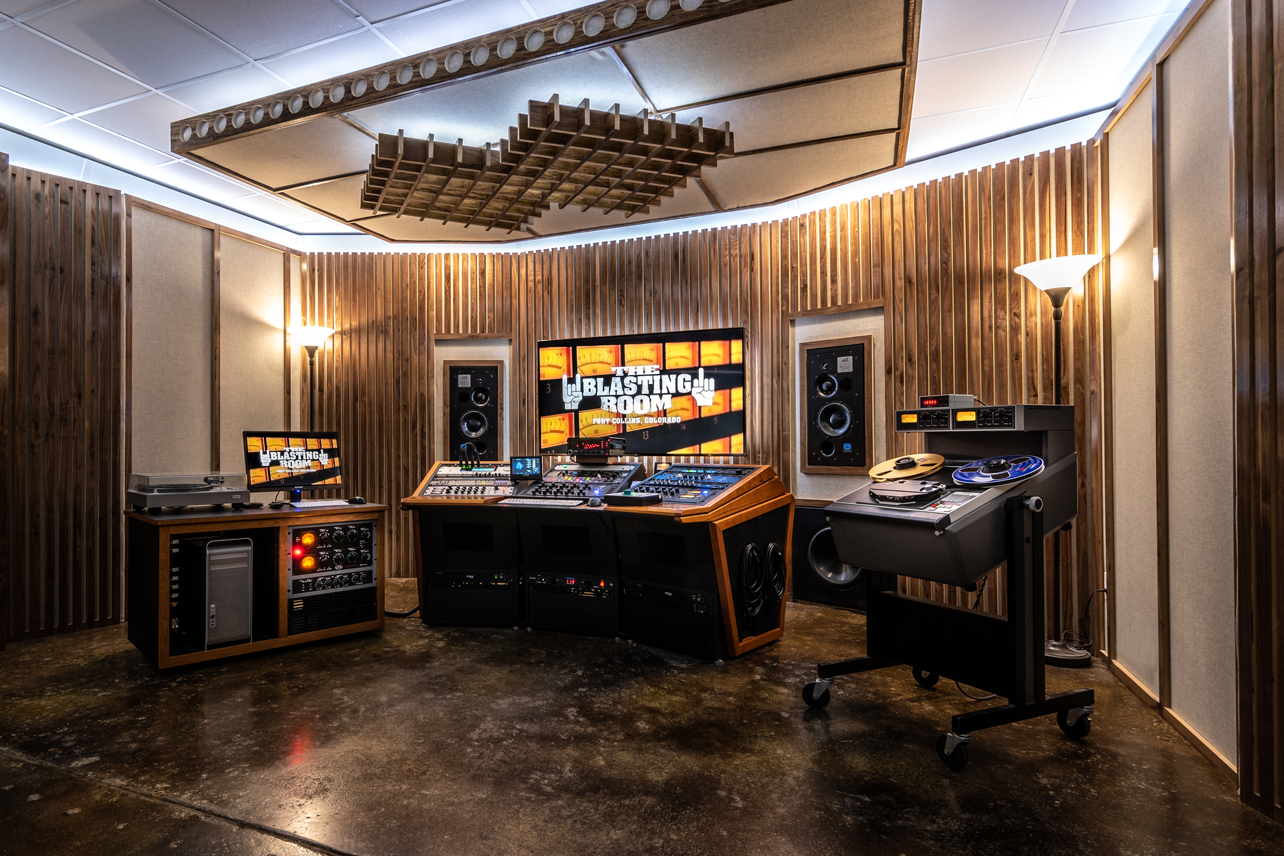
- Mastering Suite at The Blasting Room
- Type: Recording Studio
- Industry: Music
- Founded: November 1994 in Fort Collins, Colorado, US
- Founder: Bill Stevenson and members of the punk rock band All
- Services: Recording, Mixing, Mastering, Production
- Owners: Bill Stevenson, Jason Livermore
- Number of employees: Five
- Website: blastingroomstudios.com

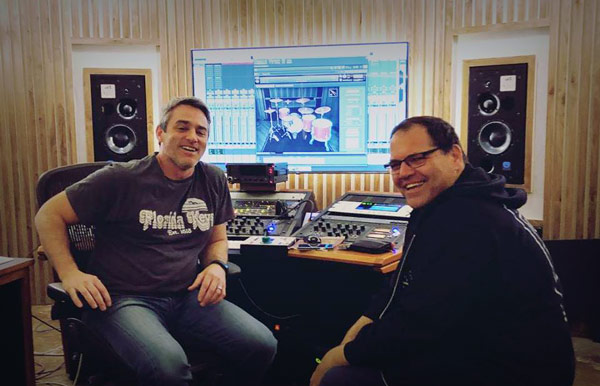
Jason and Bill in the Mastering Suite for the release of the Blasting Room virtual instrument by Room Sound.

The Blasting Room is a recording studio in Fort Collins, Colorado. Founded by members of the punk rock band All in 1994, it is owned and operated by musician Bill Stevenson (Descendents, Black Flag, All, Only Crime) and Jason Livermore. The studio is known for recording and producing many punk rock bands, with Stevenson and Livermore serving as in-house audio engineers and record producers.

== History ==
In July 1994, the members of All relocated from Brookfield, Missouri to Fort Collins. Using money from their recent recording contract with Interscope Records, they designed and began construction of The Blasting Room with the help of guitarist Stephen Egerton's father, Dan O'Reilly. The studio opened four months later, featuring a two-inch analog 24-track tape machine, a mixing console manufactured by Solid State Logic, and a variety of outboard gear. The 4,000 square foot facility includes three recording studios: Studio A, the largest, features three isolation booths; The smaller Studio B has a separate control room; Studio C is a mixing and editing suite.

In early 2018 The Blasting Room finished renovations that included the addition of a Mastering Suite designed by acoustician John H. Brandt. The Blasting Room also features a lounge, kitchen, and two bedrooms available to visiting artists. In addition to production, engineering, and mixing, the studio also offers audio mastering services done by Livermore.

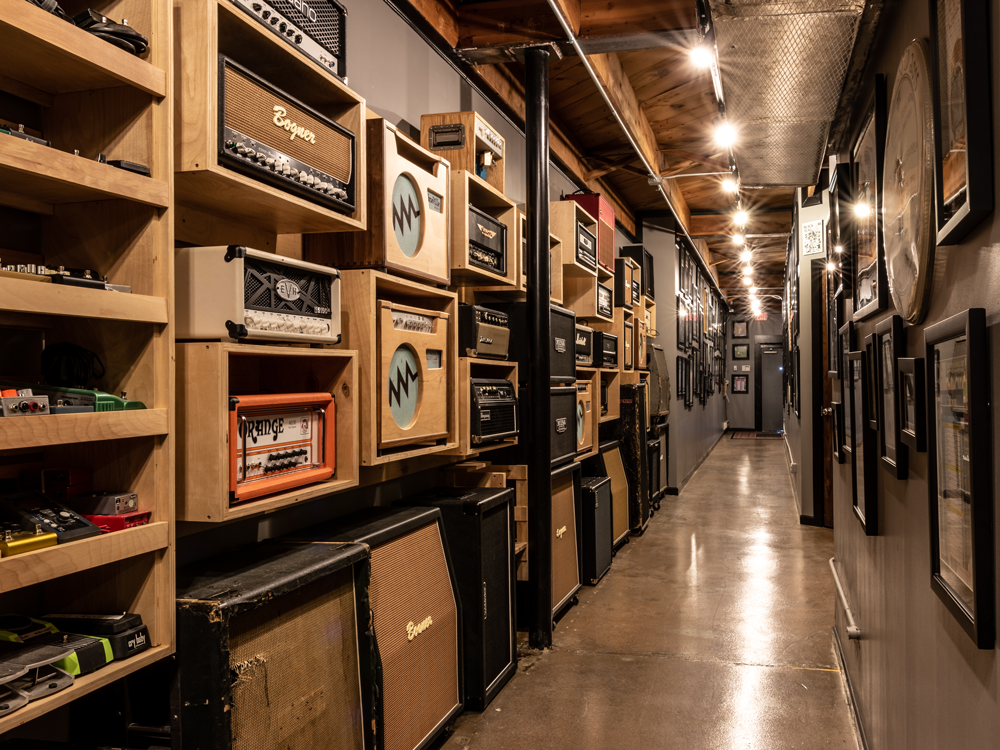
Main hallway at The Blasting Room featuring amplifier storage and band posters.

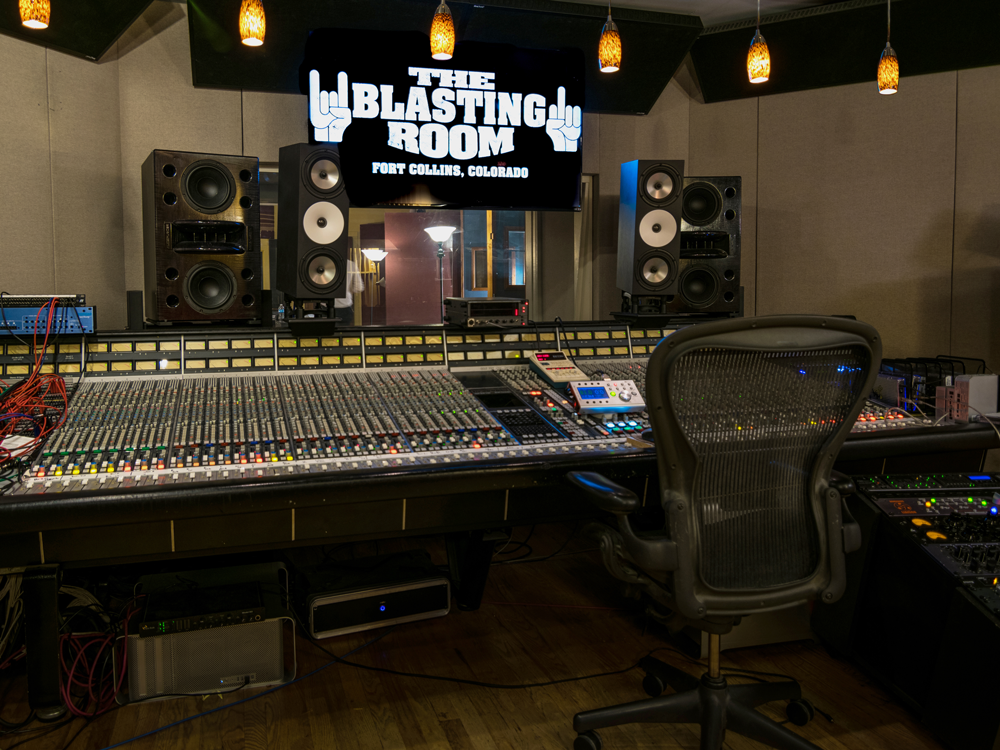
Studio A control room featuring a 4000 series SSL console

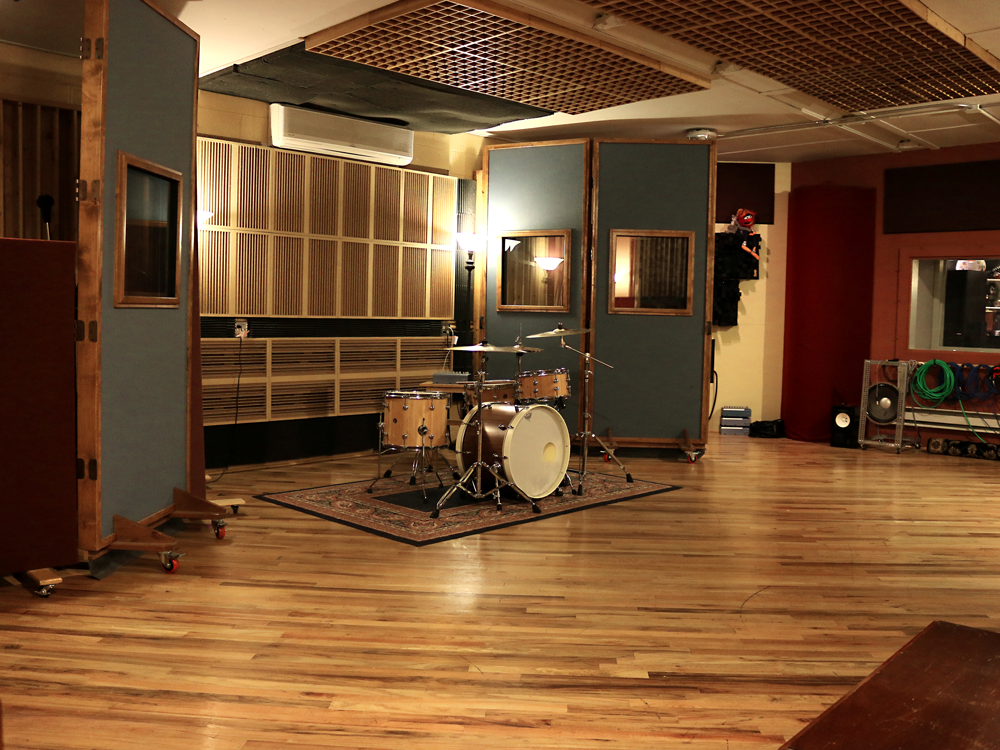
Studio A tracking room.

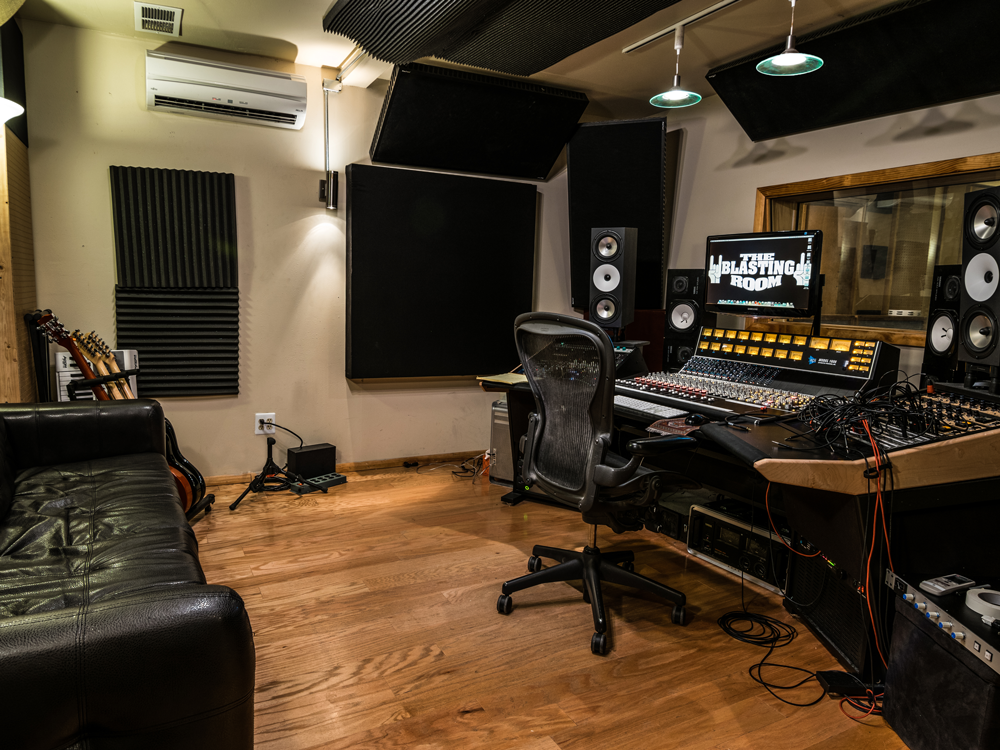
Studio B control room featuring an API 1608 console.

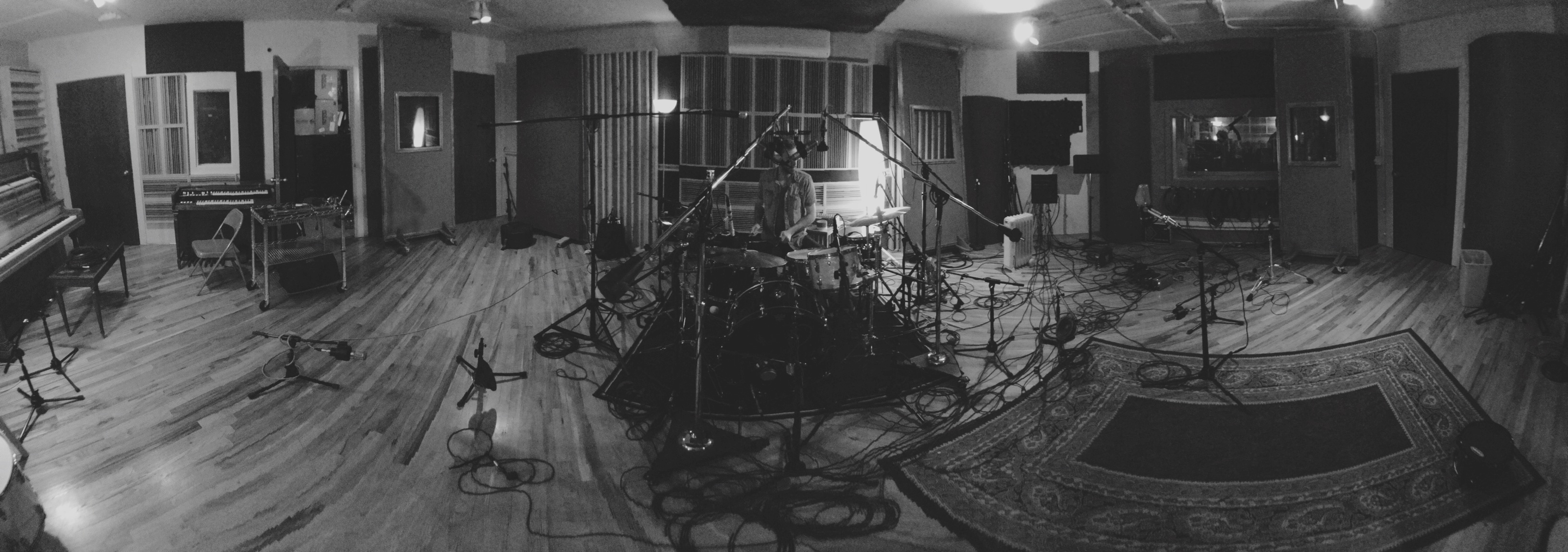
Drum tracking in Studio A.

== Albums recorded, mixed, and/or mastered at The Blasting Room ==
=== 1995 ===
- Pummel - ALL
- ...Rocks Your Lame Ass - Hagfish
- onehundredpercentfreak - Alligator Gun

=== 1996 ===
- Everything Sucks - Descendents
- Super Sound Racing - Zeke
- Sturdy - The Lemons
- Riviter - Judge Nothing
- Rocks for the Jocks - My Name

=== 1997 ===
- Pure Swank - Pink Lincolns
- Evildoers Beware! - Mustard Plug
- Seeing Things - Shades Apart

=== 1998 ===
- Let's Talk About Feelings - Lagwagon
- Uckfay Ooyay - The Jackie Papers
- Look Forward to Failure - The Ataris
- 77 Days - Kemuri
- Headcleaner - I Against I
- Broke Down - Welt
- Mass Nerder - ALL

=== 1999 ===
- To All Our Fallen Heroes - Ann Beretta
- Before You Were Punk 2: Another Punk Rock Tribute to 80's New Wave - Various artists
- I'm in Love - The Jackie Papers
- Burning Bridges - Ann Beretta
- At the Show - MxPx
- Operation Phoenix - Good Riddance
- Pray for Mojo - Mustard Plug
- All - ALL
- True Crime - Zeke

=== 2000 ===
- Borders and Boundaries - Less Than Jake
- Ace Troubleshooter - Ace Troubleshooter
- Problematic - ALL
- Wake Up Screaming - Slick Shoes
- Let's Talk About Leftovers - Lagwagon
- Armchair Martian - Armchair Martian
- Phenomenon of Craving - Good Riddance

=== 2001 ===
- Good Riddance / Kill Your Idols - Good Riddance
- Soundtrack for a Generation - Student Rick
- Death Alley - Zeke
- The Shattering - Season to Risk
- Live Plus One - Descendents and ALL
- Past Remains - Side Walk Slam
- Symptoms of a Leveling Spirit - Good Riddance
- Brand New Dream - Welt
- Facing Changes - Hangnail

=== 2002 ===
- Live at the Starlight - Drag the River
- Cover Ups - Good Riddance
- Give Back - Side Walk Slam
- Ten Years and Running - MxPx
- Closed - Drag the River
- Who Wants to Play Bass? - Armchair Martian
- Live Vol. 1 - The O.C. Supertones

=== 2003 ===
- The Biggest and the Best - Slick Shoes
- Punk Goes Acoustic - Various artists
- The Terror State - Anti-Flag
- ...And We Drive - Side Walk Slam
- Match and some Gasoline - The Suicide Machines
- Bound by Ties of Blood and Affection - Good Riddance
- Home Is Where the Hate Is - The Fight (band)
- Revolutions per Minute - Rise Against

=== 2004 ===
- Chicken Demos - Drag the River
- Hey Buddies... - Drag the River
- Left of the Dial: Dispatches from the '80s Underground - Various artists
- Rhetoric of Reason - The Code
- To the Nines - Only Crime
- Lady Melody - Audio Karate
- Love Is Worth It - Silent Drive
- Mute Print - A Wilhelm Scream
- Cool to Be You - Descendents
- On the Front Line - The Casualties
- 'Merican - Descendents

=== 2005 ===
- After Dark - Scary Kids Scaring Kids
- Naysayers and Yesmen/Laugh Now Cry Later - Reno Divorce
- This December; It's One More and I'm Free - Lydia (band)
- Resolve - Lagwagon
- Lay Waste the Poets - Inked in Blood
- Potemkin City Limits - Propagandhi
- Tony Hawk's American Wasteland - Various artists
- Waiting for the Rain - Kemuri
- Our PMA - Kemuri
- Ruiner - A Wilhelm Scream
- War Profiteering Is Killing Us All - The Suicide Machines
- Lords of Dogtown: Music from the Motion Picture - Various artists
- Wake the Dead - Comeback Kid
- You and Me - Open Hand
- Take It Back, Take It On, Take It Over! - 7 Seconds (band)
- No Lo Siento - Pink Lincolns
- Last Rides of the Midway - Shiver

=== 2006 ===
- My Pappy Was a Pistol - Filthy Thieving Bastards
- Twelve Small Steps, One Giant Disappointment - Bad Astronaut
- Recovery - Enlow
- The New Seditionaires - Lower Class Brats
- Subverter - The Esoteric
- It's Crazy - Drag the River
- Love Their Country - Me First and the Gimme Gimmes
- Too Late Show - The Lillingtons
- Lemonheads - The Lemonheads
- Under Attack - The Casualties
- The Sufferer & the Witness - Rise Against
- My Republic - Good Riddance
- Wolves in Wolves' Clothing - NOFX
- Nightmerica - Love Equals Death
- Canyoneer - No Trigger
- Never Trust a Hippy - NOFX

=== 2007 ===
- It's Dead, Jim - Warp 11
- Masterpieces: 1991–2002 - Mustard Plug
- Sink or Swim - The Gaslight Anthem
- Guilty Pleasures - Wednesday Night Heroes
- All the Best Songs - No Use for a Name
- Wolfbiker - Evergreen Terrace
- Sustain - Buck-O-Nine
- Blastin! - Kemuri
- I Remember When I Was Pretty - The Playing Favorites
- Nothing is Too Much - Coles Whalen
- Good Guys, Bad Band - Armchair Martian
- Madeline - Tickle Me Pink
- The Feel Good Record of the Year - No Use for a Name
- Career Suicide - A Wilhelm Scream
- Famous - Puddle of Mudd
- In Black and White - Mustard Plug
- Livin' the Dream - Scott Reynolds
- Broadcasting... - Comeback Kid
- Virulence - Only Crime

=== 2008 ===
- The Lost and Broken Bones - Useless ID
- Remain in Memory: The Final Show - Good Riddance
- IV - Nerf Herder
- I Think My Older Brother Used to Listen to Lagwagon - Lagwagon
- Drunk Like Bible Times - Dear and the Headlights
- You Can't Live This Way - Drag the River
- Nightmare Revisited - Various artists
- Ashes to Ashes - Welt
- Appeal to Reason - Rise Against
- Delicate Situation - Drive By

=== 2009 ===
- The World Outside - Eyes Set to Kill
- Saw VI (soundtrack) - Various artists
- High Speed Access to My Brain - Rehasher
- Supporting Caste - Propagandhi
- Gravity is What You Make It - Chase Long Beach
- Tears Before Breakfast - Reno Divorce
- They Came from the Shadows - Teenage Bottlerocket
- Volume 4: Songs in the Key of Love & Hate - Puddle of Mudd
- Cokie the Clown - NOFX
- We Are All We Have - The Casualties
- Good News, Bad Views - Broadway Calls
- Coaster - NOFX
- I'm Not Gonna Lie To You - The Decline

=== 2010 ===
- Survival Story - Flobots
- Only You (single) - Train
- I'm Still Here - Mindy McCready
- Icon - Puddle of Mudd
- The Longest EP - NOFX
- Capricorn One: Singles & Rarities - Good Riddance
- Street Dogs - Street Dogs
- Step Into the Light (single) - My Body Sings Electric

=== 2011 ===
- Symptoms - Useless ID
- Endgame - Rise Against
- Good for Me - The Swellers
- Doctor (single) - My Body Sings Electric
- Diamonds & Gold - Wire Faces
- Joey Cape's Bad Loud - Joey Cape's Bad Loud
- Smoko at the Pet Food Factory - Frenzal Rhomb
- The Complete Control Sessions - Anti-Flag
- Wonder Age - Air Dubai

=== 2012 ===
- No One Loves You Like I Do - The Life and Times
- Comet - The Bouncing Souls
- Freak Out! - Teenage Bottlerocket
- Diamond - Stick to Your Guns
- Blind - Rise Against
- Lover's Leap - Reno Divorce
- Home - Off with Their Heads
- Self Entitled - NOFX
- Ocean Crest (single) - My Body Sings Electric
- Exister - Hot Water Music
- The Circle in the Square - Flobots
- The Extended Play EP - Darling Thieves
- Comfort/Distraction - Broadway Calls
- Awakened - As I Lay Dying

=== 2013 ===
- Tony Sly Tribute (split) - Teenage Bottlerocket
- Tony Sly Tribute (split) - Anti-Flag
- Long Forgotten Songs: B-Sides & Covers 2000–2013 - Rise Against
- Pursuance - Only Crime
- Stoke Extinguisher - NOFX
- The Night Ends - My Body Sings Electric
- King Cataract - Wire Faces
- See the Light - Less Than Jake
- All for This! - Kemuri
- Revolt EP - Hundredth
- Stomp - Big D and the Kids Table
- Stroll - Big D and the Kids Table
- Tony Sly Tribute - Anti-Flag
- My Shame Is True - Alkaline Trio
- Partycrasher - A Wilhelm Scream

=== 2014 ===
- Wovenwar - Wovenwar
- The New Sidewalk - Such Gold
- The Black Market - Rise Against
- California (Single) - Reno Divorce
- NOFX: Backstage Passport - NOFX
- Are We Not Men? We Are Diva! - Me First and the Gimme Gimmes
- Hang - Lagwagon
- Rampant - Kemuri
- Denbora Da Poligrafo Bakarra - Berri Txarrak

=== 2015 ===
- American Man - The Yawpers
- Tales from Wyoming - Teenage Bottlerocket
- I Am a Rifle (single) - Propagandhi
- Bring It To Life (Side A) - Post Paradise
- Heavy Love - Man Overboard
- F - Kemuri
- Ska Bravo - Kemuri
- Bail - Head Injuries
- Peace in Our Time - Good Riddance
- Dedication - After the Fall

=== 2016 ===
- State Is Burning - Useless ID
- Quicksand EP - In the Whale
- Protection - Face to Face
- Hypercaffium Spazzinate - Descendents
- The Revenge of the Fifth - Belvedere
- Bad Vibrations - A Day to Remember
- Cut the Cord - Batfoot!

=== 2017 ===
- Adult Braces [EP] - No Trigger
- Hi Vis High tea - Frenzal Rhomb
- Infrasoinuak - Berri Txarrak

=== 2018 ===
- The Ghost Note Symphonies Vol. 1 - Rise Against
- Delusional - Bbs Paranoicos

=== 2019 ===
- Love is a Weapon - Stone & Snow
- Nine Meals - Toxic Bears
- Sangre Fácil - Segismundo Toxicómano

=== 2021 ===
- We Were Made For These Times - Stone & Snow
- Nowhere Generation - Rise Against
- Force of Habit - Immortal Sÿnn

=== 2025 ===
- Split Personality [EP] - Pulley & Fire Sale
- Self-Titled [EP] - Double Jointed
