= Cover Ups =

Compilation album by Good Riddance
- Released: July 2, 2002
- Recorded: 1996–2001 at Motor Studios in San Francisco, Lumberjack Studios and Art of Ears in Hayward, California, and The Blasting Room in Fort Collins, Colorado
- Genre: Punk rock, pop punk, melodic hardcore, hardcore punk
- Length: 23:22
- Label: Lorelei (NAIL 4)
- Producer: Ryan Greene, Bill Stevenson, Stephen Egerton, Jason Livermore

Good Riddance chronology
Good Riddance / Kill Your Idols (2001)	Cover Ups (2002)	Bound by Ties of Blood and Affection (2003)

Cover Ups is a compilation album by the Santa Cruz, California-based hardcore punk band Good Riddance, collecting all of the cover songs the band had previously released. It was released July 2, 2002 through Lorelei Records, a record label co-founded by the band's singer Russ Rankin.

== Reception ==
Kurt Morris of Allmusic gave Cover Ups two stars out of five, commenting that "Some of the tunes seemed marred by the band trying to be funny and instead being annoying (the snotty "na-na-na" chorus on 'I Melt with You,' the high-pitched girly shrieking on 'Leader of the Pack,' etc.) ... Highlights of the album would no doubt be the Kiss cover and Bill Stevenson of Black Flag, All, and the Descendents doing drums and guitar on the Black Flag tune ... cover albums are (in almost all cases) for fans only. Cover Ups is no exception."

== Track listing ==
No.	Title	Writer(s)	Original performer	Length
1.	"I Melt with You" (from Before You Were Punk, 1997)	Robbie Grey, Gary McDowell, Stephen Walker, Michael Conroy, Richard Brown	Modern English	2:22
2.	"Feel Their Pain" (from Anti-Racist Action: The Benefit CD, 1999)	Insted	Insted	2:02
3.	"I Stole Your Love" (from Ballads from the Revolution, 1998)	Paul Stanley	Kiss	2:37
4.	"Second Coming" (from Operation Phoenix, 1999)	Battalion of Saints	Battalion of Saints	1:26
5.	"Come Dancing" (from A Comprehensive Guide to Moderne Rebellion, 1996)	Ray Davies	The Kinks	2:20
6.	"Outlaw"	Glyn Barber	Chron Gen	3:05
7.	"Leader of the Pack" (from Oldies But Goodies, 1998)	Shadow Morton, Jeff Barry, Ellie Greenwich	The Shangri-Las	2:09
8.	"Hall of Fame" (from A Comprehensive Guide to Moderne Rebellion, 1996)	John Stabb, Tom Lyle, Mitch Parker, Marc Alberstadt	Government Issue	0:57
9.	"In My Head" (from Symptoms of a Leveling Spirit, 2001)	The Psychedelic Furs	The Psychedelic Furs	2:41
10.	"My War" (from Operation Phoenix, 1999)	Chuck Dukowski	Black Flag	3:43
Total length:				23:22

== Personnel ==
=== Musicians ===
- Russ Rankin – vocals; bass guitar on track 10; additional guitar on track 5
- Luke Pabich – guitar, backing vocals
- Chuck Platt – bass guitar on tracks 1–5 and 7–9
- Devin Quinn – bass guitar on track 6
- Rich McDermott – drums on tracks 1 and 6
- Sean Sellers – drums on tracks 2–5, 7, and 8
- Dave Wagenschutz – drums on track 9
- Bill Stevenson – drums and additional guitar on track 10

=== Production ===
- Ryan Greene – producer, recording and mix engineer of tracks 1, 3, 5, and 8
- Andy Ernst – recording engineer of tracks 2 and 7
- Adam Krammer – assistant recording engineer of track 3
- Bill Stevenson – producer, recording and mix engineer of tracks 4, 9, and 10
- Stephen Egerton – producer, recording and mix engineer of tracks 4, 9, and 10
- Jason Livermore – producer, recording and mix engineer of tracks 4, 9, and 10; mastering
- Joe Logsdon – recording engineer of track 6
- Brant Dobson – cover art
