= Bound by Ties of Blood and Affection =

Studio album by Good Riddance
- Released: May 20, 2003
- Recorded: January 2003 at The Blasting Room, Fort Collins, Colorado
- Genre: Punk rock, melodic hardcore
- Length: 29:56
- Label: Fat Wreck Chords (FAT 654)
- Producer: Bill Stevenson, Jason Livermore

Good Riddance chronology
| Cover Ups (2002) | Bound by Ties of Blood and Affection (2003) | My Republic (2006) |

Bound by Ties of Blood and Affection is the sixth studio album by the Santa Cruz, California-based hardcore punk band Good Riddance, released May 20, 2003 through Fat Wreck Chords. Like their previous two studio albums it was recorded at The Blasting Room in Fort Collins, Colorado with the production team of Bill Stevenson and Jason Livermore. It was their last album with drummer Dave Wagenschutz; following his departure the band slipped into a period of inactivity during which singer Russ Rankin formed Only Crime with Stevenson. Good Riddance would return in 2006 for My Republic with drummer Sean Sellers, who had previously been in the band from 1996 to 1999.

== Reception ==
Johnny Loftus of Allmusic rated Bound by Ties of Blood and Affection four stars out of five, stating that "though there isn't much new in the sentiment or songcraft, the message is as relevant as ever, and its delivery system is a raucous, satisfying punk rock megaphone. It's important for Rankin and the lads to carry their torches and set up their soapboxes, since for too many kids, punk means Hot Topic hair gel and black-vinyl spiked wristbands." A Punknews.org review also rated the album four stars out of five, comparing it favorably to the band's previous albums: "While this new album shows characteristics of their past work, it maintains a better flow than Ballads from the Revolution which, while great, portrayed an almost confused band, with songs switching off from super-poppy to hardcore. This album is closer to their last record Symptoms of a Leveling Spirit in the raw-yet-melodic punk style they have settled on, yet this album is higher quality songwriting overall than that previous record. While this does not top their classic A Comprehensive Guide to Moderne Rebellion, it is definitely near the top of their catalog".

== Track listing ==
All lyrics are written by Russ Rankin; all music is composed by Russ Rankin, except where noted.

| No. | Title | Length |
|---|---|---|
| 1. | "Made to Be Broken" | 1:58 |
| 2. | "More De Palma, Less Fellini" (Pabich) | 1:49 |
| 3. | "Saccharine" | 2:16 |
| 4. | "Up the Affiliates" (contains a dialogue excerpt from the film Escape from New York) | 0:58 |
| 5. | "Boxing Day" | 2:10 |
| 6. | "The Dubious Glow of Excess" (Pabich) | 2:23 |
| 7. | "Black Bag Confidential" | 2:16 |
| 8. | "Paean to the Enlightenment" (Platt) | 1:27 |
| 9. | "There's No 'I' in Team" | 2:17 |
| 10. | "The Process" | 1:44 |
| 11. | "Dylan" | 1:52 |
| 12. | "Remember Me" | 1:56 |
| 13. | "Shame, Rights & Privilege" (Platt) | 1:30 |
| 14. | "Bobby Baun" (contains a dialogue excerpt from the film The Breakfast Club) | 5:20 |
| Total length: | | 29:56 |

== Personnel ==
- Russ Rankin – vocals
- Luke Pabich – guitar
- Chuck Platt – bass guitar
- Dave Wagenschutz – drums
- Bill Stevenson – producer, recording and mix engineer
- Jason Livermore – producer, recording and mix engineer
