= My Republic =

Studio album by Good Riddance
- Released: June 27, 2006
- Recorded: Motor Studios, San Francisco
- Genre: Punk rock, pop punk, melodic hardcore
- Length: 30:41
- Label: Fat Wreck Chords (FAT 707)
- Producer: Bill Stevenson, Jason Livermore

Good Riddance chronology
Bound by Ties of Blood and Affection (2003)	My Republic (2006)	Remain in Memory: The Final Show (2008)

My Republic is the seventh studio album by the Santa Cruz, California-based hardcore punk band Good Riddance, released June 27, 2006 through Fat Wreck Chords. It marked the band's return from an almost three-year period of inactivity, during which singer and primary songwriter Russ Rankin had been active in his new band Only Crime while guitarist Luke Pabich had started a side project called Outlie. It also marked the return of drummer Sean Sellers to Good Riddance, replacing Dave Wagenschutz who had played on the band's two previous albums Symptoms of a Leveling Spirit (2001) and Bound by Ties of Blood and Affection (2003). Sellers had previously been a member of Good Riddance from 1996 to 1999, playing on A Comprehensive Guide to Moderne Rebellion (1996), Ballads from the Revolution (1998), and Operation Phoenix (1999), and had played with Pabich in Outlie during Good Riddance's hiatus.

Good Riddance had recorded their three previous albums at The Blasting Room in Fort Collins, Colorado, but for My Republic they returned to Motor Studios in San Francisco, where they had recorded 1998's Ballads from the Revolution. However, they retained the production team of Bill Stevenson and Jason Livermore from The Blasting Room, who had recorded and produced all of their studio material since 1999. My Republic would prove to be Good Riddance's final studio album, as the band broke up in May 2007 before reforming five years later. It was followed by Remain in Memory: The Final Show, a live album recorded at their final performance.

== Release ==
On May 9, 2006, My Republic was announced for release in a month's time. Two days later, "Texas" was posted on the band's Myspace profile, followed by "Darkest Days" on May 23, and "Shame" on June 16. On June 21, 2006, My Republic was made available for streaming via music website Punknews.org; the following day, a music video was released for "Darkest Days". My Republic was released on June 27, 2006 through Fat Wreck Chords.

== Reception ==
Corey Apar of Allmusic rated My Republic three and a half stars out of five, remarking that "[it] may be Good Riddance's seventh proper album to date, but instead of sounding tired and played out, it finds the band as fierce and commanding as it was at number one ... their furious SoCal hardcore continues to be tempered by a greater sense of melody." He particularly complemented Rankin's lyrics, saying "As personal as he is politically charged, Rankin has always possessed a certain heartfelt sincerity to his articulated disillusionment that manages to ring much closer to home than, say, the vehemently militaristic rage of a band like Anti-Flag." Chris Moran of Punknews.org also gave the album three and a half stars out of five, stating that "What you get with My Republic is the Good Riddance sampler platter: some harder, some melodic and some in between. The opening track, 'Out of Mind,' is the best song Bad Religion never wrote, with the exception of Russ' distinctive vocals." He was critical of the album's pacing, however, with slower tracks like "Texas" and "Boise" placed immediately after more raucous songs like "Out of Mind" and "Regret", and found Rankin's vocals lacking "bite": "And thus seems to be the constant theme of the album — pick me up with some great stuff, and then let me down with some 'eh' material. Musically and lyrically (for the most part), this is some of the best music Good Riddance has ever done. Unfortunately, it's the delivery that stumbles. Russ's vocals just seem to be lacking that punch they’ve always had."

== Track listing ==
All lyrics are written by Russ Rankin; all music is composed by Russ Rankin, except where noted.

No.	Title	Length
1.	"Out of Mind"	2:22
2.	"Texas"	2:03
3.	"Shame"	1:48
4.	"Tell Me Why"	2:30
5.	"Torches and Tragedies" (Luke Pabich)	1:28
6.	"Darkest Days"	2:41
7.	"Up to You"	1:27
8.	"Regret"	2:17
9.	"Boise"	3:06
10.	"Rise and Fall" (Pabich)	1:39
11.	"Broken"	2:31
12.	"Save the Children"	2:07
13.	"This Beast Is Dangerous" (Pabich)	1:47
14.	"Uniform"	2:55
Total length:		30:41

The compact disc version of the album includes enhanced CD content consisting of video footage of a three-song live performance in Santa Cruz, California from August 2005, and a PETA documentary entitled "Meet Your Meat".

== Personnel ==
- Russ Rankin – vocals
- Luke Pabich – guitar
- Chuck Platt – bass guitar
- Sean Sellers – drums
- Bill Stevenson – producer, recording and mix engineer
- Jason Livermore – producer, recording and mix engineer, mastering
- Johnny Schou – additional engineering
- Andrew Berlin – additional engineering
- Jamie McMann – additional engineering
