= Good Riddance / Ensign =

EP by Good Riddance and Ensign
- Released: 1997
- Recorded: 1996 at Art of Ears
- Genre: Hardcore punk, skate punk, punk rock, pop punk
- Label: Orphaned

Good Riddance chronology
Good Riddance / Ill Repute (1996)	Good Riddance / Ensign (1997)	Ballads from the Revolution (1998)

Good Riddance / Ensign is a split EP by the hardcore punk bands Good Riddance and the Ensign, released in 1997 through Orphaned Records. Good Riddance's "What We Have" was one of seven songs that had been demoed for their second album, A Comprehensive Guide to Moderne Rebellion, but had been left off the record; they were recorded in a separate session from the album, with Andy Ernst at Art of Ears, and used on split EPs with Reliance, Ignite, Ill Repute, and Ensign over the following year. Their second track, "Salt", also appeared on their third album, Ballads from the Revolution, in 1998.

Reflecting on "What We Have", Good Riddance singer Russ Rankin remarked that "Lyrically it's like if you looked up 'generic hardcore song' in the dictionary it would have this tune next to it. Plenty about friends and music and heart and all the things that made mid to late 1990s hardcore so fun but also so uninteresting."

== Track listing ==
Side A: Good Riddance
No.	Title	Writer(s)	Length
1.	"What We Have"	Russ Rankin	2:29
2.	"Salt"	Rankin	1:49

Side B: Ensign
No.	Title	Length
1.	"Tourniquet"
2.	"Where Did We Go Wrong"

== Personnel ==
=== Good Riddance ===
- Russ Rankin – vocals
- Luke Pabich – guitar
- Chuck Platt – bass guitar
- Sean Sellers – drums

=== Production ===
- Andy Earnst – recording and mix engineer (Side A)
