= Good Riddance / Ill Repute =

EP by Good Riddance and Ill Repute
- Released: 1996
- Recorded: 1996 at Art of Ears
- Genre: Hardcore punk, punk rock
- Label: It's Alive

Good Riddance chronology
Ignite / Good Riddance (1996)	Good Riddance / Ill Repute (1996)	Good Riddance / Ensign (1997)

Good Riddance / Ill Repute is a split EP by the hardcore punk bands Good Riddance and Ill Repute, released in 1996 through It's Alive Records. Good Riddance's tracks were two of seven that had been demoed for their second album A Comprehensive Guide to Moderne Rebellion but had been left off the record; they were recorded in a separate session from the album, with Andy Ernst at Art of Ears, and used on split EPs with Reliance, Ignite, Ill Repute, and Ensign over the following year.

Reflecting on the tracks, Good Riddance singer Russ Rankin remarked that "Lame Duck Arsenal" "showcases all of the things our band did really well. Lyrically I was thinking about how a President whose term is up but still has to serve two or three more months is called a 'lame duck' because he is more or less useless. I was juxtaposing this against the U.S. nuclear arsenal and how we have more than enough weapons to destroy the entire planet several times over and how, to me, this renders much of our current arsenal useless." "Off the Wagon" was written about a friend of Rankin's who was struggling with sobriety.

== Track listing ==
Side A: Good Riddance
No.	Title	Lyrics	Music	Length
1.	"Lame Duck Arsenal"	Russ Rankin	Rankin	2:15
2.	"Off the Wagon"	Rankin	Luke Pabich	2:39

Side B: Ill Repute
No.	Title	Length
1.	"Bleed"
2.	"Roots"

== Personnel ==
=== Good Riddance ===
- Russ Rankin – vocals
- Luke Pabich – guitar
- Chuck Platt – bass guitar
- Sean Sellers – drums

=== Production ===
- Andy Earnst – recording and mix engineer (Side A)
