= Ignite / Good Riddance =

- Cover of the Ignite side (side A)

EP by Ignite and Good Riddance
- Released: 1996
- Recorded: 1996 at Art of Ears
- Genre: Hardcore punk, melodic hardcore
- Label: Revelation (REV 053)

Ignite chronology
Family (1995)	Ignite / Good Riddance (1996)	Past Our Means (1996)

Good Riddance chronology
Good Riddance / Reliance (1996)	Ignite / Good Riddance (1996)	Good Riddance / Ill Repute (1996)

Alternative cover
- Cover of the Good Riddance side (side B)

Ignite / Good Riddance is a split EP by the hardcore punk bands Ignite and Good Riddance, released in 1996 through Revelation Records. Good Riddance's tracks were two of seven that had been demoed for their second album, A Comprehensive Guide to Moderne Rebellion, but had been left off the record; they were recorded in a separate session from the album, with Andy Ernst at Art of Ears, and used on split EPs with Reliance, Ignite, Ill Repute, and Ensign over the following year.

Reflecting on the song "Twenty-One Guns", Good Riddance singer Russ Rankin said it was "a song about the plight of a soldier risking his life in some remote outpost for a cause he isn't privy to. The irony that we flippantly waste so much human life but wait until someone's death to bestow all of this honor and ceremony upon them. Musically a very angry song, very Born Against sounding to me now." "Class War 2000" was influenced musically by T.S.O.L. and lyrically by The Dils' 1977 song "Class War", after which it was titled.

== Track listing ==
Side A: Ignite
No.	Title	Writer(s)	Length
1.	"Past Our Means"
2.	"Banned in D.C." (originally performed by Bad Brains)	H.R., Dr. Know, Darryl Jenifer, Earl Hudson

Side B: Good Riddance
No.	Title	Writer(s)	Length
1.	"Twenty-One Guns"	Russ Rankin	2:05
2.	"Class War 2000"	Rankin	1:41

== Personnel ==
=== Ignite ===
- Zoli Téglás – vocals
- Joe D. Foster – guitar
- Brett Rasmussen – bass guitar
- Casey Jones – drums

=== Good Riddance ===
- Russ Rankin – vocals
- Luke Pabich – guitar
- Chuck Platt – bass guitar
- Sean Sellers – drums

=== Production ===
- Andy Earnst – recording and mix engineer (Side B)
