= Good Riddance / Kill Your Idols =

EP by Good Riddance and Kill Your Idols
- Released: November 20, 2001
- Recorded: February 2001 at The Blasting Room, Fort Collins, Colorado and March 11, 2001 The Creep House, Downingtown, Pennsylvania
- Genres: Punk rock, melodic hardcore, hardcore punk
- Length: 13:13
- Label: Jade Tree (JT 1065)
- Producers: Bill Stevenson, Stephen Egerton, Jason Livermore, Kill Your Idols, Arik Victor, Mike Bardzik

Good Riddance chronology
Symptoms of a Leveling Spirit (2001)	Good Riddance / Kill Your Idols (2001)	Cover Ups (2002)

Kill Your Idols chronology
Funeral for a Feeling (2001)	Good Riddance / Kill Your Idols (2001)	Kill Your Idols / Nerve Agents (2002)

Good Riddance / Kill Your Idols is a split EP by the hardcore punk bands Good Riddance and Kill Your Idols, released on November 20, 2001, by Jade Tree.

== Reception ==
Johnny Loftus of Allmusic gave the EP three and a half stars out of five, remarking that "[Good Riddance's] tightly wound sound is well represented here; 'Judas and the Morning After Pill' and 'Grandstanding from the Cheap Seats' have an urgent punk traditionalism about them that's reminiscent of Bad Religion. For their part, Kill Your Idols prove that the rabid, ragged-edges sound of New York City's defiant hardcore scene is still going strong."

== Track listing ==
Good Riddance
No.	Title	Lyrics	Music	Length
1.	"Judas and the Morning After Pill" (contains a dialogue excerpt from the film They Live)	Russ Rankin	Luke Pabich	1:27
2.	"Grandstanding from the Cheap Seats"	Rankin	Rankin	1:25
3.	"Queen and John"	Rankin	Rankin	2:07
4.	"Strickland vs. Washington" (contains a spoken excerpt from the book War on the Poor by Mumia Abu-Jamal)	Rankin	Chuck Platt	1:13

Kill Your Idols
No.	Title	Length
5.	"Chesterfield King and Propagandhi"	1:33
6.	"I Told You So"	2:35
7.	"Another Great Start to a Miserable Day"	2:53
Total length:		13:13

== Personnel ==
=== Good Riddance ===
- Russ Rankin – vocals
- Luke Pabich – guitar
- Chuck Platt – bass guitar
- Dave Wagenschutz – drums
- Bill Stevenson – producer, recording and mix engineer
- Stephen Egerton – producer, recording and mix engineer
- Jason Livermore – producer, recording and mix engineer, mastering

=== Kill Your Idols ===
- Andy West – vocals
- Gary Bennett – guitar
- Brian Meehan – guitar
- Paul Delaney – bass guitar
- Raeph Glicken – drums
- Arik Victor – recording engineer
- Mike Bardzik – recording engineer
