= Thoughts and Prayers (album) =

Studio album by Good Riddance
- Released: July 19, 2019
- Studio: The Blasting Room, Fort Collins
- Genre: Melodic hardcore, hardcore punk, skate punk, punk rock
- Length: 28:22
- Label: Fat Wreck Chords (FAT 124)
- Producer: Bill Stevenson and Jason Livermore

Good Riddance chronology
Peace in Our Time (2015)	Thoughts and Prayers (2019)	Before The World Caves In (2026)

Thoughts and Prayers is the ninth studio album by the Santa Cruz, California-based hardcore punk band Good Riddance, released July 19, 2019 through Fat Wreck Chords. It is the band's second studio album since their 2007 breakup and 2012 reunion. Unlike previous albums which featured some musical writing contribution from Luke Pabich and Chuck Platt, Thoughts and Prayers was solely written by frontman Russ Rankin.

== Background ==
Following the band's reunion in 2012 and the performance of a few shows, Good Riddance returned to the studio. From those studio sessions came Peace in Our Time, released on April 21, 2015.

Four years later, on May 16, 2019, the band announced the upcoming release of a new studio album titled Thoughts and Prayers on Instagram. With that announcement came the early release of the track "Don't Have Time." Four weeks later, the band released "Our Great Divide" as a preview as well.

On July 17, two days before the official release date, British rock magazine Kerrang! released a free stream of the album on YouTube. The early release also came with a short description of the lyrical message behind every track.

== Critical reception ==
Reception towards the album is generally positive. Punknews awarded the album 7 out of 10 stars, commenting that the album starts strong and that the band "hasn't lost one bit of edge. If anything, they've cut some of the pop punk that infiltrated "Peace in Our Time" and focused more on what they do best, catchy melodic hardcore. [...] Most of this album does not let up in terms of speed, aggression, and vitriol." However, the review criticizes Good Riddance for their tendency to "[lack] originality compared to what some of their peers are doing," while also praising the band for [making] up for it in terms of the message conveyed with Russ Rankin's lyrics, the song writing and the musicianship."

AllMusic also gave the album 7 out of 10 stars, remarking that the album is "as socially and politically charged as ever. Reviewer James Christopher Monger praises the album for "[feeling] familiar but not in an anodyne way." Monger also points out that some songs do not deviate far from the band's "winning blend of melody and might, but there is an urgency to the new material that speaks to both the current zeitgeist and the pioneering and uncompromising spirit of punk rock."

== Track listing ==
All lyrics are written by Russ Rankin

No.	Title	Music	Length
1.	"Edmund Pettus Bridge"	Rankin	2:57
2.	"Rapture"	Rankin	0:46
3.	"Don't Have Time"	Rankin	1:27
4.	"Our Great Divide"	Rankin	2:17
5.	"Wish You Well"	Rankin	2:43
6.	"Precariat"	Rankin	2:30
7.	"No King but Caesar"	Rankin	2:50
8.	"Who We Are"	Rankin	3:23
9.	"No Safe Place"	Rankin	2:33
10.	"Pox Americana"	Rankin	1:29
11.	"Lo Que Sucede"	Rankin	2:26
12.	"Requisite Catastrophes"	Rankin	3:11
Total length:			28:22
