= Good Riddance / Reliance =

Extended play

EP by Good Riddance and Reliance
- Released: 1996
- Recorded: 1996 at Art of Ears
- Genre: Punk rock, pop punk
- Label: Little Deputy (LD 7015)

Good Riddance chronology
A Comprehensive Guide to Moderne Rebellion (1996)	Good Riddance / Reliance (1996)	Ignite / Good Riddance (1996)

Good Riddance / Reliance is a split EP by the Santa Cruz, California-based punk rock bands Good Riddance and Reliance, released in 1996 through the Austin, Texas label Little Deputy Records. Good Riddance's tracks were two of seven that had been demoed for their second album A Comprehensive Guide to Moderne Rebellion but had been left off the record; they were recorded in a separate session from the album, with Andy Ernst at Art of Ears, and used on split EPs with Reliance, Ignite, Ill Repute, and Ensign over the following year.

Reflecting on the tracks, Good Riddance singer Russ Rankin called "Remember When" "Another love song, this one for the undisputed champion of girls who have Good Riddance songs written about them." Of "Flawed", he remarked that "This one features the usual tight riffing Luke [Pabich] had in his songs and I remember I had some difficulty figuring out how to lay the lyrics over it but it turned out to be a pretty cool tune."

== Track listing ==
Side A: Good Riddance
No.	Title	Lyrics	Music	Length
1.	"Remember When"	Russ Rankin	Rankin	2:05
2.	"Flawed"	Rankin	Luke Pabich	1:34

Side B: Reliance
No.	Title	Length
1.	"Apathy"
2.	"Enemy"

== Personnel ==
=== Good Riddance ===
- Russ Rankin – vocals
- Luke Pabich – guitar
- Chuck Platt – bass guitar
- Sean Sellers – drums

=== Production ===
- Andy Earnst – recording and mix engineer (Side A)
