= Live Plus One =

Live album by All and the Descendents
- Released: August 21, 2001
- Recorded: October 10–14, 1996 (Descendents); March 30 and 31, 2001 (All)
- Venues: Whisky a Go Go, Los Angeles (Descendents); The Starlight, Fort Collins, Colorado (All)
- Studios: The Blasting Room, Fort Collins, Colorado
- Genre: Hardcore punk
- Length: 91:36
- Label: Epitaph
- Producers: Bill Stevenson, Stephen Egerton, Jason Livermore

All chronology
Problematic (2000)	Live Plus One (2001)

Descendents chronology
Sessions (1997)	Live Plus One (2001)	'Merican (2004)

Live Plus One is a live album by the American punk rock bands All and the Descendents, released in 2001 through Epitaph Records. A double album, it includes one disc by All recorded in 2001 on their Problematic tour, and a second disc by the Descendents recorded in 1996 on their Everything Sucks tour. The two bands are composed of the same musicians—bassist Karl Alvarez, guitarist Stephen Egerton, and drummer Bill Stevenson—but have different lead singers: Chad Price for All and Milo Aukerman for the Descendents. Live Plus One reached #45 on Billboard's Top Independent Albums chart, making it the only All release and the second Descendents release ever to chart.

== Background ==
In 1987 singer Milo Aukerman left the Descendents to pursue a career in biochemistry. The remaining members—bassist Karl Alvarez, guitarist Stephen Egerton, and drummer Bill Stevenson—changed the band's name to All, releasing eight albums between 1988 and 1995 with singers Dave Smalley, Scott Reynolds, and Chad Price. In 1995 Aukerman expressed a desire to return to recording and performing, so the band members decided to work with him as the Descendents while continuing to work with Price as All, and both bands signed to Epitaph Records. The Descendents released Everything Sucks in 1996, supporting it with a series of tours from September 1996 to August 1997. The recordings used for Live Plus One were taken from a five-night stand at the Whisky a Go Go in Los Angeles from October 10–14, 1996. The live recording was engineered by Brett Gurewitz, the head of Epitaph Records and a member of Bad Religion.

Following the Everything Sucks tours Aukerman returned to his biochemistry career, and All released two more albums on Epitaph: Mass Nerder (1998) and Problematic (2000). In preparation for inclusion on Live Plus One, the Descendents' 1996 Whisky a Go Go recordings were mixed by Stevenson, Egerton, and Jason Livermore at All's recording studio The Blasting Room in Fort Collins, Colorado from March 20–29, 2001. All then recorded two performances at the Starlight in Fort Collins on March 30 and 31 for the album, engineered by Livermore and Jan Saylor, and these were mixed by Stevenson, Egerton, and Livermore at The Blasting Room from April 1–10. Both discs of the album were mastered by Livermore, while he, Stevenson, and Egerton served as producers. The cover illustration of All was done by Chris Shary; an additional illustration of the Descendents—identical to the cover but with Aukerman in place of Price—was used for the inner liner.

Live Plus One was released through Epitaph August 21, 2001. It was the final release for All on Epitaph: The Descendents moved to Fat Wreck Chords for 2004's Cool to Be You, then returned to Epitaph for 2016's Hypercaffium Spazzinate, while All has not issued any new recordings since 2001.

== Reception ==
Live Plus One became the first All release and second Descendents release to chart, reaching #45 on Billboard's Top Independent Albums chart. Jeremy Salmon of Allmusic gave the album four stars out of five, calling the Descendents disc the more vital of the two:

All, being the later form, has songs which show a better overall sense of pop craftedness. The problem is that All's songs lack the primitive drive, (post-?) adolescent emotion, and angst of a Descendents track. The recordings of the Descendents, made in 1996 during the Everything Sucks tour, show a band which can still summon up the energy first exhibited on record in 1983. Not a bad feat for a band 13 years after the fact and with two different members [...] All is All, and that should suit their fans, but the Descendents steal the limelight here as the more vital band, and deserves to be heard by a wider audience.

== Track listing ==
Disc 1: All at the Starlight in Fort Collins, Colorado, March 30 and 31, 2001
No.	Title	Writer(s)	Length
1.	"Fairweather Friend"	Karl Alvarez	1:48
2.	"Skin Deep"	Alvarez	1:57
3.	"Can't Say"	Alvarez (music and lyrics), Bill Stevenson (music)	1:59
4.	"She Broke My Dick"	Stevenson (lyrics), Stephen Egerton (music)	0:52
5.	"Until I Say So"	Chad Price	2:55
6.	"Crucifiction"	Alvarez	2:20
7.	"Breakin' Up"	Stevenson	2:39
8.	"Better Than That"	Alvarez	2:21
9.	"Bubblegum"	Alvarez	2:35
10.	"Honey Peeps"	Price	1:55
11.	"She's My Ex"	Stevenson	3:07
12.	"World's on Heroin"	Stevenson (music and lyrics), Egerton (music)	2:13
13.	"Birds"		2:40
14.	"I Want Out"	Egerton, Stevenson	0:55
15.	"Educated Idiot / Life on the Road"	Alvarez / Stevenson	2:53
16.	"Birthday I.O.U."	Stevenson	2:38
17.	"Carnage"	Stevenson	2:27
18.	"'Cause"	Alvarez	2:25
19.	"Self-Righteous"	Alvarez	3:42
20.	"Teresa"	Stevenson	1:45
21.	"I Hate to Love"	Alvarez	1:51
22.	"Carry You"	Alvarez	2:27
Total length:			50:24

Disc 2: Descendents at the Whisky a Go Go in Los Angeles, October 10–14, 1996
No.	Title	Writer(s)	Length
1.	"My Dad Sucks"	Frank Navetta, Tony Lombardo	0:37
2.	"I'm the One"	Alvarez	2:15
3.	"Hope"	Milo Aukerman	1:55
4.	"Thank You"	Alvarez	2:16
5.	"M-16"	Lombardo, Aukerman	0:45
6.	"Mr. Bass"	Navetta	2:12
7.	"Weinerschnitzel"	Stevenson, Pat McCuistion	0:16
8.	"Original Me" (originally performed by All)	Price	2:46
9.	"I Like Food"	Stevenson	0:17
10.	"Silly Girl"	Stevenson	2:20
11.	"Coffee Mug"	Stevenson (music and lyrics), Egerton (music)	0:42
12.	"Get the Time"	Aukerman	3:17
13.	"Myage"	Stevenson	2:01
14.	"Cheer"	Stevenson	2:57
15.	"We"	Aukerman	2:36
16.	"Everything Sux"	Egerton	1:41
17.	"This Place"	Aukerman	1:17
18.	"Van"	Aukerman (lyrics); Alvarez, Egerton (music)	3:14
19.	"Bikeage"	Stevenson	2:08
20.	"All-O-Gistics"	Stevenson, McCuistion (lyrics); Egerton (music)	3:38
21.	"Catalina"	Lombardo, Stevenson	2:02
Total length:			41:12

== Personnel ==
Adapted from the album liner notes.

Band

- Chad Price – vocals (disc 1)
- Milo Aukerman – vocals (disc 2)
- Stephen Egerton – guitar, producer, mix engineer
- Karl Alvarez – bass guitar
- Bill Stevenson – drums, producer, mix engineer

Production

- Brett Gurewitz – live recording engineer (disc 2)
- Jason Livermore – producer, mastering, live recording engineer (disc 1)
- Jay Saylor – live recording engineer (disc 2)

Artwork

- Eli Atkins – layout and design, photography
- Chris Shary – illustrations
- Chip Guthry, Soren McCarty, and Stacie Stevenson – photography
