= Peace in Our Time (Good Riddance album) =

Studio album by Good Riddance
- Released: April 21, 2015
- Recorded: November 2014
- Studio: Motor Studios, San Francisco
- Genre: Melodic hardcore, hardcore punk, skate punk, punk rock
- Length: 26:58
- Label: Fat Wreck Chords (FAT 942)
- Producer: Bill Stevenson

Good Riddance chronology
Capricorn One: Singles & Rarities (2010)	Peace in Our Time (2015)	Thoughts and Prayers (2019)

Peace in Our Time is the eighth studio album by the Santa Cruz, California-based hardcore punk band Good Riddance, released April 21, 2015 through Fat Wreck Chords. It is the band's first studio album since My Republic in 2006, and the first album they recorded and released following their temporary breakup, which lasted from 2007 to 2012.

== Background and recording ==
Good Riddance disbanded in 2007; however, they reunited in 2012. After reuniting, Good Riddance performed several concerts and featured at several festivals, but by 2013, singer Russ Rankin expressed uncertainty that the band would release new music. Ultimately, Rankin stated that he and the other band members "finally succumbed to the inevitable itch to write new music." Rankin had been writing new music since 2010 and eventually presented demos of his new songs to the other members of Good Riddance, who enjoyed the songs and wanted to record them as a band. Guitarist Luke Pabich aided in the songwriting process by contributing guitar riffs and song ideas as well.

During the time the band was broken up, while the other band members had taken a hiatus from performing to focus on their families and other occupations, the drummer, Sean Sellers, had performed with Authority Zero and The Real McKenzies. However, Rankin stated that the band did not have to significantly readjust to the recording process despite their breakup: "It was like nothing had changed. I think the combination of the same four of us that had recorded so much together and our history with Bill [Stevenson], who was producing us, everybody had the same work flow. We were limited a little bit by having actual jobs and stuff now and family we didn't have before, but it was very similar, very familiar."

Peace in Our Time was recorded in November 2014 at Motor Studios in San Francisco, with Bill Stevenson serving as record producer and audio engineer. The album was mixed and mastered by Jason Livermore at The Blasting Room. The cover illustration was designed by Chris Shary. At only 27 minutes long, it is the band's shortest album to date. Regarding the recording of the album, Rankin said, "I don't know how I wrote songs before GarageBand on my Mac computer. Being able to sit down with my laptop, plug in my guitar and demo a whole song is incredible. It is awesome."

== Release ==
On February 13, 2015, the band's label, Fat Wreck Chords, announced that Good Riddance would release Peace in Our Time on April 21.

Peace in Our Time was released April 21, 2015 through Fat Wreck Chords. Music videos were released for the songs "Dry Season" and "Disputatio".

Following the release of Peace in Our Time, Good Riddance performed at a 25th anniversary event in honor of Fat Wreck Chords in San Francisco, California. Shortly afterwards, the band embarked on a tour throughout North America in September and October 2015 to support the album, starting in Philadelphia, Pennsylvania, and ending in Winnipeg, Manitoba. Supporting acts included Off with Their Heads, Iron Chic, Western Addiction, and Fire Next Time.

== Reception ==
Professional ratings
Review scores
Source	Rating
Dying Scene	5/5 stars
The Music	3.5/4 stars
PunkNews	8/10 stars
Scene Point Blank	8/10 stars

Peace in Our Time received critical acclaim, with reviewers complimenting the band's ability to maintain the aggression and lyrical quality they displayed prior to their 2007 breakup while simultaneously demonstrating maturity.

PunkNews granted the album 8 out of 10 stars, complimenting the album's "melodic edge," noting that songs were noticeably heavier than those found in the band's prior album My Republic, and stating that "[the band] may have grown, but musically, nothing's changed." The review singled out "Teachable Moments" and "Shiloh" as standout tracks. Dying Scene granted the album 5 out of 5 stars. Their review noted the band's maturation and positively compared the album to Bad Religion with regards to the album's eloquent lyrics and songwriting style. The review called Peace in Our Time "the best album of the year."

SLUG Magazine reviewer James Orme complimented the band's refinement of their established style "while maintaining their level of intensity and passion they've had their entire career" and compared the album's style to Lagwagon and early output from The Offspring. Orme stated that the album featured "top-notch writing," although Orme did not grant the album a star rating. Scene Point Blank granted the album 8 out of 10 stars, with their reviewer praising the album's variation in different punk styles "without straying too far from the band's signature sound."

A review from The Music granted Peace in Our Time 3.5 out of 4 stars, favorably comparing the band's style to Bad Religion and NOFX and complimenting the album's conciseness. In complimenting the band's songwriting and lyricism, the review stated, "What bands like [Good Riddance] have proven is not only have they still got it, nothing's changed: everything they're saying is as relevant as ever."

== Track listing ==
All lyrics are written by Russ Rankin.

No.	Title	Music	Length
1.	"Disputatio"	Luke Pabich	1:47
2.	"Contrition"	Rankin	2:03
3.	"Take It to Heart"	Rankin	2:25
4.	"Half Measures"	Pabich	1:56
5.	"Grace and Virtue"	Rankin	2:01
6.	"No Greater Fight"	Pabich	1:20
7.	"Dry Season"	Rankin	2:20
8.	"Teachable Moments"	Rankin	1:33
9.	"Washed Away"	Rankin	1:54
10.	"Our Better Nature"	Pabich	1:45
11.	"Shiloh"	Chuck Platt	1:41
12.	"Running on Fumes"	Rankin	2:35
13.	"Year Zero"	Pabich	1:52
14.	"Glory Glory"	Rankin	1:40
Total length:			26:58

== Personnel ==
Good Riddance

- Russ Rankin – vocals
- Luke Pabich – guitar
- Chuck Platt – bass guitar
- Sean Sellers – drums

Production

- Bill Stevenson – producer, engineer
- Jason Livermore – mixing engineer, mastering
- Chris Shary – illustration
- Alan Snodgrass – photographs
- Sergie Loobkoff – layout and design
