= For God and Country (Good Riddance album) =

Studio album by Good Riddance
- Released: February 7, 1995
- Recorded: October 1994 at Razor's Edge Studios, San Francisco
- Genre: Punk rock
- Length: 30:45
- Label: Fat Wreck Chords (FAT 523)
- Producer: Fat Mike, Ryan Greene, Good Riddance

Good Riddance chronology
Gidget (1993)	For God and Country (1995)	Decoy (1995)

For God and Country is the debut studio album by Santa Cruz, California-based hardcore punk band Good Riddance, released February 7, 1995 through Fat Wreck Chords.

== Reception ==
Andy Hinds of Allmusic called For God and Country "quite a mature and focused debut, thanks largely to the leadership of singer Russ Rankin, whose deep personal convictions give the band an intelligently idealistic variation on SoCal punk ... Musically, the band are typical of most Fat Wreck and Epitaph groups (they seem to have learned most of their tricks from the tremendously influential Bad Religion), but the group's heartfelt message gives their music a resonating power that lifts them above their contemporaries."

== Track listing ==
All tracks are written by Good Riddance (Russ Rankin, Luke Pabich, Chuck Platt, and Rich McDermott).

No.	Title	Length
1.	"Flies First Class"	2:39
2.	"Better"	2:22
3.	"All Fall Down"	2:00
4.	"United Cigar"	2:46
5.	"Decoy"	2:46
6.	"Boys and Girls"	3:00
7.	"Mother Superior"	3:05
8.	"Twelve Year Circus"	2:45
9.	"Man of God"	1:42
10.	"Lisa"	2:44
11.	"Wrong Again"	2:42
12.	"October"	2:10
Total length:		30:45

== Personnel ==
- Russ Rankin – vocals
- Luke Pabich – guitar, backing vocals
- Chuck Platt – bass guitar, backing vocals
- Rich McDermott – drums
- Fat Mike – producer
- Ryan Greene – producer, recording engineer, mix engineer
