= 'Merican =

- The cover of the CD version

EP by the Descendents
- Released: February 10, 2004
- Recorded: February and April 2002
- Studios: The Blasting Room, Fort Collins, Colorado; Planet of Sound, Wilmington, Delaware
- Genre: Hardcore punk
- Length: 15:15
- Label: Fat Wreck Chords
- Producer: Bill Stevenson

Descendents chronology
Live Plus One (2001)	'Merican (2004)	Cool to Be You (2004)

Alternative cover
- The cover of the vinyl version

'Merican is an EP by the American punk rock band Descendents, released February 10, 2004. It was the band's first release for Fat Wreck Chords and served as a pre-release to their sixth studio album Cool to Be You, released the following month. The EP includes two songs from the album: "Nothing with You" and "'Merican", and three B-sides from the album's sessions: "Here with Me", "I Quit", and the hidden track "Alive". 'Merican marked the first release of new studio material from the Descendents since 1996's Everything Sucks and was their third release ever to chart, peaking at number 29 on Billboard's Top Independent Albums chart and at number 38 on Top Heatseekers.

== Background and recording ==
In 1987, Descendents singer Milo Aukerman had left the band to pursue a career in biochemistry. The remaining members—bassist Karl Alvarez, guitarist Stephen Egerton, and drummer Bill Stevenson—changed the band's name to All and released eight albums on Cruz Records and Interscope Records between 1988 and 1995 with singers Dave Smalley, Scott Reynolds, and Chad Price. Aukerman contributed occasional songwriting and backing vocals, and in 1995 decided to return to music. The members decided to operate as two bands, working with Aukerman as the Descendents and with Price as All. Both bands signed to Epitaph Records and the Descendents released Everything Sucks in 1996. Following the album's supporting tours Aukerman had returned to his science career, though he recorded backing vocals for All's 1998 album Mass Nerder. All also released Problematic in 2000 and Live Plus One in 2001, a double live album that included a Descendents disc recorded in 1996.

The recording sessions for the Descendents' sixth studio album Cool to Be You took place with Aukerman in February 2002 at The Blasting Room in Fort Collins, Colorado, with additional recording done in April at Planet of Sound in Wilmington, Delaware, and were produced by Stevenson. The band recorded the music for the songs live in the studio with minimal overdubbing, and Aukerman's vocals were recorded over the instrumental tracks. However, these recordings were not released for another two years. Stevenson explained that the gap of eight years between Descendents albums was due to the band members having children, and his father's death.

== Release ==
For the releases of 'Merican and Cool to Be You the Descendents signed to Fat Wreck Chords. Label head and musician Fat Mike was a longtime fan of the band, and his enthusiasm for working with them was a major factor in their decision to sign to the label. Stevenson commented that "If you've got the owner of the label saying he wants to put out a record by what is probably his favorite band of all time, that's rad. That's the best possible position for a band to be in." The 'Merican EP was released in February 2004, followed by the full-length album in March. Stevenson remarked that the EP served as a teaser for Cool to Be You: "It's funny because, from the old Descendents fan's point of view, it's kind of like 'What? Why did they put out this EP? It doesn't even have the best songs on it. I waited seven years for this?' But from the newer kids perspective, it's more like, hey let's try to introduce this new decade of kids to Descendents so it's at least on the tip of their tongue when the album comes out." 'Merican was released on both compact disc and extended play formats, each with a different cover, drawn by Jeff Hagedorn, depicting the band's Milo character dressed as Uncle Sam.

== Themes ==
The songs on 'Merican address topics including love and relationships, sociopolitical commentary, and frustrations with life in a touring band. Aukerman remarked that "there's no part of the 'Merican EP that is a retread of anything we've done in the past. Some of the songs are major departures for us, like 'Here with Me,' and the hidden track 'Alive.' Even the title song is actually a stretch for us; if you look back on all the songs we have done, there are very few that have any 'political' content in them." "'Merican" addresses positive and negative aspects of American history, celebrating cultural figures such as Otis Redding, Duke Ellington, and Walt Whitman while condemning slavery, Joseph McCarthy, the Ku Klux Klan, and the Vietnam War.

"I Quit" was written by Aukerman about the frustrations of being in a band and on the road, with lyrics such as "Sick all the time, I miss my wife / I quit / Got better things to do with my life / I quit". Aukerman explained of the song:

I can't even count the number of times I've quit this band, dating back to 1982 and Milo Goes to College! Like most of my songs, "I Quit" is my attempt to capture those emotions that come and go, the transient ones. Those types of emotions, to me, make for the best songs because they tend to be extreme! So there is no "message" to the song, just me spewing about the negative aspects of band life. At the time I wrote the song, I really did want to quit. I don't really care how people take the song; as the line says, "I don't give a flying fuck what you think of me."

== Reception ==
'Merican became the third Descendents release to chart (following Everything Sucks and Live Plus One), peaking at number 29 on Billboard's Top Independent Albums chart and at number 38 on Top Heatseekers. John Luerssen of AllMusic remarked that "Nothing with You" "revisit[s] the timeless lovelorn attack of cherished songs from their past like 'Wendy,' 'Clean Sheets,' and 'Silly Girl'", while "'Merican" "harks back to vintage Bad Religion" and "I Quit" is "a nervous, edgy 'Catalina'-like throwback". He was less complimentary about the other two songs, calling "Here with Me" merely a "palatable midtempo number" and "Alive" "worth skipping, as it drags in a way that no Descendents number has a right to."

== Trivia ==
Here With Me was originally written in 1989 by Milo and first played with his short lived band Milestone.

== Track listing ==
All tracks are written by Milo Aukerman, except where noted.

Side A
No.	Title	Length
1.	"Nothing with You"	2:35
2.	"'Merican" (Karl Alvarez)	1:50

Side B
No.	Title	Length
1.	"Here with Me"	3:43
2.	"I Quit" "Alive" (hidden track)	7:05
Total length:		15:15

== Personnel ==
Band

- Milo Aukerman – lead vocals
- Stephen Egerton – guitar, recording engineer
- Karl Alvarez – bass guitar
- Bill Stevenson – drums, producer

Additional performers

- Chad Price – backing vocals

Production

- Jason Livermore – recording engineer, mix engineer, mastering
- Andrew Berlin – additional engineer
- Brad Newsom – additional engineer
- Jeff Hagedorn – cover illustration, design, layout
- Jesse Fischer – photography

== See also ==
- American
