= The Phenomenon of Craving =

EP by Good Riddance
- Released: May 23, 2000
- Recorded: March 2000 at The Blasting Room, Fort Collins, Colorado
- Genre: Punk rock, melodic hardcore
- Length: 13:57
- Label: Fat Wreck Chords (FAT 611)
- Producer: Bill Stevenson, Stephen Egerton, Jason Livermore

Good Riddance chronology
Operation Phoenix (1999)	The Phenomenon of Craving (2000)	Symptoms of a Leveling Spirit (2001)

The Phenomenon of Craving is an EP by the Santa Cruz, California-based hardcore punk band Good Riddance, released May 23, 2000 through Fat Wreck Chords. A portion of the proceeds from this album benefit the Homeless Garden Project in Santa Cruz, CA. Their drummer Sean Sellers had left the band in December 1999, so Dave Raun of Lagwagon drummed on the EP and on several tours with the band. A full-time replacement would be found in Kid Dynamite's Dave Wagenschutz, who joined the band for their fifth album Symptoms of a Leveling Spirit the following year.

== Reception ==
Mark Cyst of The Big Takeover gave the EP two and a half stars out of five, stating that "Good Riddance don't do much more than show that they are still angry, and that they still play hardcore ... I've heard much better material on the band's earlier efforts."

== Track listing ==
All lyrics are written by Russ Rankin.

No.	Title	Music	Length
1.	"Cages" (contains a dialogue excerpt from the film Slap Shot)	Luke Pabich	1:58
2.	"One for the Braves"	Rankin	2:29
3.	"Uniontown"	Pabich	2:33
4.	"Calendar"	Rankin	1:48
5.	"Start at Zero"	Rankin	3:13
6.	"Undefeated"	Pabich	1:56
Total length:			13:57

== Personnel ==
- Russ Rankin – vocals
- Luke Pabich – guitar
- Chuck Platt – bass guitar
- Dave Raun – drums
- Bill Stevenson – producer, recording and mix engineer
- Stephen Egerton – producer, recording and mix engineer
- Jason Livermore – producer, recording and mix engineer
- Ramon Breton – mastering
