= My Body Sings Electric =

American alternative rock and post-hardcore band

- Origin: Denver, Colorado, US
- Genres: Alternative rock, indie, post-hardcore
- Years active: 2007–present
- Label: Unsigned
- Members: Brandon Whalen; Nick Crawford; Jason Bower; Jeff Fedel; Ben Scarboro
- Past members: Kalen Bigg; Dennis Dejnowski
- Website: http://MyBodySingsElectric.com

My Body Sings Electric is an American alternative rock and post-hardcore band formed in Denver, Colorado in 2007. In their early days, the band played music that was heavy and experimental, but in 2010, the band has changed its musical focus and concentrated on writing more pop sensible music for their debut full-length album.

The band has a full-length record, Changing Color to be released early in 2011. "Changing Color" was recorded at Interlace Audio in Portland, Oregon, owned by Kris Crummett. Stephan Hawkes produced, recorded, engineered, mixed, and mastered the album.

Since late 2011, the band has released two singles, "Doctor" and "Oceancrest" (including engineering and mixing from Jason Livermore - whose work includes Rise Against, As I Lay Dying and Alkaline Trio). They also self-booked two west coast tours and a trip to Austin for SXSW 2012 and 2013.

== History ==
=== They Don't Want Music (2007–2009) ===
My Body Sings Electric was originally formed out of the remains of two bands, Nemonic, and Arms Over Colorado. Nick Crawford, Jeff Fedel, Dennis Dejnowski, and Kalen Bigg arrived from Nemonic, and Brandon Whalen arrived from Arms Over Colorado. The bands decided to join forces after Nick Crawford and Jeff Fedel of Nemonic expressed displeasure with their lead singer at the time. Brandon Whalen offered to join the band as the lead vocalist.

The band's name "My Body Sings Electric" was derived from the poem Sing the Body Electric by Walt Whitman. The band was driven by a common love for bands like the Sound Of Animals Fighting and the Mars Volta. Original bassist Dennis Dejnowski left the band in summer 2008 and was replaced with current bassist Jason Bower.

My Body Sings Electric released their first self-produced EP, They Don't Want Music, in 2009. Though the album was praised for "admirable instrumentation" and "lyrical ambition," it was criticized for its "spaced-out noodling" and a lack of discipline.

=== Warped Tour Appearance (2009) ===
In Summer 2009, My Body Sings Electric was selected by Ernie Ball to play the Denver stop of Warped Tour 2009 at Invesco field at Mile High. The band was elated for an opportunity to play at the festival. Lead singer Brandon Whalen was quoted as saying, "To a lot of people, just seeing our name associated with a big tour like Warped Tour sort of legitimizes what we are doing."

=== A Shift in Musical Focus and Member Changes (2010) ===
Late in 2009, the band began writing songs for a full-length album to be recorded in 2010. Having grown weary of playing heavy music, and having grown bored with the direction of hardcore in the Denver music scene, the band decided to change their musical style and concentrate on writing catchy, pop music with indie rock and punk rock influences.

In early 2010, drummer Kalen Bigg left the band. Ben Scarboro, of Denver hardcore band The Skyline Surrender took over the drumming duties.

=== Changing Color (2010–2012) ===
In November 2010, My Body Sings Electric traveled to Portland, Oregon to record at Interlace Audio. The members were huge fans of many albums recorded at Interlace, including records from Dance Gavin Dance, Fear Before, and Closure In Moscow. The production quality of the album was an improvement over "They Don't Want Music" and enhanced the band's new pop-sensible sound. Stephan Hawkes produced, engineered, recorded, mixed, and mastered the album. "Changing Color" was scheduled to be released in early April 2011.

In April 2011, My Body Sings Electric released “Changing Color” to a two-night run of sold-out shows at The Bluebird with friends in The Epilogues and Input. The long list of shows in 2011 included a date at Red Rocks Amphitheater.

In late 2011 the band embarked on a west coast tour named, "Terminatour 2011" through Billings, Bremerton, Portland, San Francisco, Los Angeles and Las Vegas.

In the beginning of 2012, bassist Jason Bower took a leave of absence for personal reasons. Unwilling to slow the pace, the band pressed on with close friend Marshall Gallagher (touring guitarist for 3OH!3) on bass duties. The year would include a main stage performance at Westword Music Showcase with Churchill, Macklemore and Girl Talk along with a trip to Austin for SXSW 2012, and another west coast tour through Las Vegas, Los Angeles, San Francisco, Portland, Seattle and Idaho.

In the spring of 2012, Changing Color cracked the top 200 on the CMJ charts and the band inked licensing agreements with 17 national TV networks including Showtime, MTV, Bravo, Fox Sports and Discovery Networks.

Bower returned as bassist for the band in December 2012, as Gallagher moved to Los Angeles.

=== "Oceancrest" – Present ===
The band entered the studio in late 2012 to record a new single with Jason Livermore (Rise Against, As I Lay Dying, Alkaline Trio). "Oceancrest" was released shortly after on December 4, 2012. With the release of the new single, for the first time the band received attention from national music bloggers. The single received features from popular music blogs including Kings of A&R, The Ruckus and The Kollection.

On the heels of the single's success the band planned to enter the studio in 2013 to record a two part album to be released in separate EPs over the next year.

=== Winning KTCL 93.3's Hometown For the Holidays (2010-2012) ===
Late in 2010, My Body Sings Electric was selected as one of the top three acts in KTCL 93.3's Hometown For the Holidays contest. The band's first single, Step Into The Light, was selected by radio listener surveys as one of the top three songs in the contest, along with songs from Air Dubai, and The Heyday.

My Body Sings Electric was again selected as one of the top three acts in KTCL 93.3's Hometown For the Holidays contest in 2011. This time My Body Sings Electric's single, "Doctor" propelled the band deep into the contest. They were overtaken by Denver band Churchill whose song "Change" went on to reach No. 20 on Billboard's alternative charts in 2012. However, My Body Sings Electric won the evening's live prize based on crowd noise for evening's favorite act earning them a cash prize of $1,000.

My Body Sings Electric would ultimately sweep the contest in 2012 based on the strength of their single "Oceancrest." In their third straight year in the top three of the contest, the band was crowned winners of the overall prize and the crowd favorite vote in front of an audience of 700+. "It felt pretty safe to make a prediction about the winner of Channel 93.3's Hometown for the Holidays contest by the time My Body Sings Electric finished their set at Cassleman's..." said the Denver Westword.

The win pushed the band into the ranks of previous winners like Flobots, Churchill, Air Dubai, and the Epilogues. For the win the band received recording time at The Blasting Room, a cash prize of $1,000 and a slot on 2013's Not So Silent Night (the 2012 date hosted Fun. and Of Monsters and Men with 7,000+ in attendance.)

== Band members ==
Current members

- Brandon Whalen - lead vocals
- Jason Bower - bass guitar, backup vocals
- Nick Crawford - guitar, backup vocals
- Jeff Fedel - guitar
- Justin Trujillo - drums

Former members

- Kalen Bigg - drums
- Dennis Dejnowski - bass
- Ben Scarboro - drums
- Marshall Gallagher - bass

== Discography ==
Studio albums

- Changing Color (2011)

Singles

- Oceancrest (2012)
- Doctor (2011)
- Step Into The Light (2010)

EPs

- They Don't Want Music (2009)
