= Gidget (EP) =

EP by Good Riddance
- Released: 1993
- Recorded: 1993 at Lumberjack Productions
- Genre: Punk rock, melodic hardcore
- Length: 11:11
- Label: Little Deputy (LD 7002)

Good Riddance chronology
Gidget (1993)	For God and Country (1995)

Gidget is the debut EP by the Santa Cruz, California-based hardcore punk band Good Riddance, released in 1993 through Austin, Texas record label Little Deputy Records. The EP is titled after the fictional character Gidget, and the cover image is of actress Sally Field as the character from the Gidget television series of 1965–1966. Singer Russ Rankin later recalled "that recording was from our first demo tape. Little Deputy basically took four songs from that demo tape and pressed 'em". It was the band's only recording with bassist Devin Quinn, who according to Rankin was "a disciple of Pete [Rypins] from Crimpshrine and Matt [Freeman] from Operation Ivy and you can hear all his runs and counter melodies in ['Not So Bad']." "Last Believer" was titled after an episode of the 1991 PBS documentary series on President Lyndon B. Johnson; the song was re-recorded for the band's 1996 album A Comprehensive Guide to Moderne Rebellion.

== Track listing ==
All lyrics are written by Russ Rankin.

Side A
No.	Title	Music	Length
1.	"Not So Bad"	Rankin	2:35
2.	"Last Believer"	Luke Pabich	3:07

Side B
No.	Title	Music	Length
1.	"Just for Today"	Rankin	1:49
2.	"Patriarch"	Pabich	3:40
Total length:			11:11

== Personnel ==
=== Band ===
- Russ Rankin – vocals
- Luke Pabich – guitar
- Devin Quinn – bass guitar
- Rich McDermott – drums

=== Production ===
- Joe Logsdon – recording and mix engineer
