= Side Walk Slam =

Rock band

- Origin: Carmi, Illinois
- Genres: Punk rock, pop punk, skate punk
- Years active: 1998–2003
- Labels: Tooth & Nail, Boot to Head
- Spinoffs: Run Kid Run, David Curtis
- Past members: David Josiah Curtis; Neil Endicott; Matt Jackson; Marcuss Hall; Kevin Hobby

Side Walk Slam was an American three-piece punk rock band, that would later form the band Run Kid Run. The band formed in Southern Illinois in a thriving local punk scene. Originally signed to Boot to Head Records, the band was later picked up by Seattle's Tooth and Nail Records. The band is named after the professional wrestling move of the same name, popularized by WCW wrestler, Booker T.

== History ==
Side Walk Slam began playing together around 1996, and began touring as a band in 1998. In 1999 they self-released their first album, Rock Anthems From The Midwest. In 2000, the band signed with Boot to Head Records and released 2 Steps Forward, 5 Steps Back. In July of that year, the band was set to tour with Kokomo, Indiana's Calibretto 13, who had recently been signed to Tooth and Nail Records. Side Walk Slam asked Calibretto to play a ten minute set at the beginning of Calibretto's Cornerstone Music Festival set. While the band played, Brandon Ebel of Tooth and Nail Records watched them from backstage, and signed them to Tooth and Nail."CAUGHT IN THE MIDDLE - SIDE WALK SLAM / RUN KID RUN". labeledpodcast.com (Podcast). April 28, 2022.

The band worked with Bill Stevenson (Descendants/All) at the Blasting Room in Fort Collins, CO on all three studio albums for Tooth and Nail records. After the release of Give Back, the band's first tour with Tooth and Nail, was with The Dingees and Ghoti Hook.

== Discography ==
- ...And We Drive, 2003 (Tooth & Nail Records)
- Give Back, 2002 (Tooth & Nail Records)
- Past Remains, 2001 (Tooth & Nail Records)
- 2 Steps Forward, 5 Steps Back, 2000 (Boot to Head Records)
- Rock Anthems From The Midwest, 1999 (independent)
