= Remain in Memory: The Final Show =

Live album by Good Riddance
- Released: March 18, 2008
- Recorded: May 27, 2007 in Santa Cruz, California
- Genre: Hardcore punk, melodic hardcore, skate punk, punk rock, pop punk
- Length: 77:46
- Label: Fat Wreck Chords (FAT 725)
- Producer: Jamie McMann

Good Riddance chronology
My Republic (2006)	Remain in Memory: The Final Show (2008)	Capricorn One: Singles & Rarities (2010)

Remain in Memory: The Final Show is a live album by the hardcore punk band Good Riddance, recorded at their final performance May 27, 2007 in their hometown of Santa Cruz, California and released March 18, 2008 through Fat Wreck Chords.

== Reception ==
Katherine Fulton of Allmusic rated Remain in Memory four stars out of five, saying that "Despite being a live recording, Remain in Memory is remarkably clear — the vocals are articulate and the instruments are vibrant without overwhelming Russ Rankin's impassioned performance, as evidenced on 'Flies First Class'. Throughout the album, Good Riddance is aggressive, at times almost manic, but the overall tone is bright and hopeful even when the band is criticizing politics and society." Ben Conoley of Punknews.org gave it three and a half stars out of five, commenting that the album's length was an impediment to holding listeners' interest: "Remain in Memory captures the whole show, not just highlights, and is not comprised of songs recorded on different nights. This also serves as one of the album's drawbacks, though. At 30 songs, the set is just too long for anyone but a diehard fan to really stay interested in the whole time. It helps that all of their best songs are represented and spread apart enough to pull you back in, but an hour-plus of Good Riddance is simply too much."

Both Fulton and Conoley praised the album's production value, with Fulton remarking that "Part of the fun of Remain in Memory is that it's engineered well enough that everyone is featured — Rankin, his bandmembers, and even the audience are all captured in a way that's refreshingly authentic." Conoley noted that "Remain in Memory spent quite a bit of time in the mixing and mastering stage, leaving the final product as polished as you'd want a live album to be. The end result is a live album with songs sounding balanced and clean, but with enough of the live spirit and vocal/musical changes remaining to make sure you don't forget you're listening to a live song. The crowd's applause is raised in between songs and where appropriate and their singing along is noticeable, such as on the band’s anthem 'Mother Superior.'"

== Track listing ==
All lyrics are written by Russ Rankin; all music is composed by Russ Rankin, except where noted.

No.	Title	Length
1.	"Intro"	2:02
2.	"Heresy, Hypocrisy, and Revenge" (Luke Pabich; contains a dialogue excerpt from the film Some Kind of Wonderful)	2:20
3.	"Made to Be Broken"	2:03
4.	"More DePalma, Less Fellini" (Pabich)	2:35
5.	"Weight of the World" (Pabich)	1:41
6.	"Flies First Class" (Rankin, Pabich, Chuck Platt, Rich McDermott)	2:47
7.	"Think of Me"	2:07
8.	"Yesterday’s Headlines"	2:29
9.	"Without Anger"	2:42
10.	"Out of Mind"	2:23
11.	"Salt"	2:21
12.	"A Credit to His Gender"	3:00
13.	"United Cigar" (Rankin, Pabich, Platt, McDermott)	2:47
14.	"21 Guns"	1:58
15.	"Last Believer" (Pabich)	4:21
16.	"Fertile Fields" (Pabich)	2:12
17.	"Darkest Days"	2:49
18.	"One for the Braves"	2:32
19.	"Shadows of Defeat"	1:57
20.	"All Fall Down" (Rankin, Pabich, Platt, McDermott)	3:24
21.	"Letters Home"	2:24
22.	"Indoctrination"	2:06
23.	"Not So Bad"	2:26
24.	"30 Day Wonder" (Pabich)	1:45
25.	"Steps"	2:18
26.	"Shit-Talking Capitalists"	1:46
27.	"Libertine"	3:21
28.	"Pisces / Almost Home"	2:46
29.	"Winning the Hearts and Minds"	1:57
30.	"Mother Superior" (Rankin, Pabich, Platt, McDermott)	3:26
31.	"Waste"	3:01
Total length:		77:46

== Personnel ==
- Russ Rankin – vocals
- Luke Pabich – guitar
- Chuck Platt – bass guitar
- Sean Sellers – drums
- Cinder Block – female vocals on "A Credit to His Gender"
- Jamie McMann – producer, recording engineer
- Josh Garcia – recording engineer
- Mike Mulet – assistant engineer
- Courtney Eason – assistant engineer
- Andrew Berlin – additional engineering
- Jason Livermore – mix engineer, mastering
