= ...And We Drive =

Studio album by Side Walk Slam
- Released: September 16, 2003
- Genre: Punk rock, pop punk, skate punk
- Length: 25:48
- Label: Tooth & Nail
- Producer: Bill Stevenson

Side Walk Slam chronology
Give Back (2002)	...And We Drive (2003)

Professional ratings
Review scores
Source	Rating
AllMusic	3/5 stars
Jesus Freak Hideout	3/5 stars
Punknews.org	2.5/5 stars

...And We Drive is an album by Side Walk Slam, released in 2003 by Tooth & Nail Records.

== Critical reception ==
Exclaim! called the album "an admirable achievement for such a young group, Side Walk Slam seem poised to take back the crown from pop punk's ailing kings."

== Track listing ==
No.	Title	Length
1.	"...And We Drive"	2:06
2.	"When I'm Gone"	2:14
3.	"Time Will Pass By"	1:40
4.	"Carmi Times"	2:06
5.	"Say Goodbye"	2:21
6.	"One of a Kind"	1:43
7.	"Back to You"	1:45
8.	"Behind My Back"	1:50
9.	"Letting Go"	2:00
10.	"All Nighter"	2:03
11.	"Stand Alone"	2:04
12.	"Forever Yours"	3:28
