= The Starlight =

Bar and concert venue in Colorado, USA

Coordinates: 40°35′18.11″N 105°4′38.83″W

The Starlight, 167 N. College Ave., was a bar and concert venue in Old Town Fort Collins, Colorado. The bar was known as "Mountain Tap" for many years, before a late '90s name change. The bar went through a series of owners in the mid-2000s, including a collective headed by local nightclub magnates Joe Vader and Lucky Kerig. The nightclub reopened in February 2007 as "Hodi's Half-Note". The Mountain Tap was a casual hang out specialty beer bar with pool tables. It hosted a weekly Bluegrass jam. Students & professors alike would gather there. New owners took over around 1996 to host more significant concerts. They cold never afford the significant construction to open the room up as needed to host proper bands. There had been a bearing wall cutting off a third of the dance floor with a long skinny seating area behind the wall with one window looking onto the stage & dance floor. Finally a new owner bought the bar and began the construction. Opening night was to be former Jerry Garcia bandmate Merl Saunders. The construction was not ready in time and that first show had to be moved to "Tony's" a few blocks south on January 17, 1997. So the Starlight officially opened soon after that. Colorado band String Cheese Incident played there on March 8, 1997. Merl Saunders came back and played the new bar a few times. Also documented on Concert Archives were the Itals, God Street Wine, Steve Kimock, Vinyl, Railroad Earth, Max Creek, DJ Loren (Bassnectar) with Michael Kang of String Cheese Incident, JJ Grey, Fareed Haque, and many more great acts. And may more great acts played Hodi's Halfnote after The Starlight changed hands again. The club was approximately 250-350 capacity in the main room. It is now a comedy club which took over the space around 2020.

The Starlight hosted late schizophrenic keyboardist-vocalist Wesley Willis and defunct post-punk rock band Caril featuring the Alberts brothers, Cameron and Kirk, Myke Fedyk and Jason Sharp. Also, the bar was one of many Fort Collins locations where the movie Our Burden Is Light was filmed.

During 2003, the Fort Collins-based punk band ALL booked three sold-out shows for their Stockage 2003 Festival.

According to its MySpace site, The Starlight hosted Cherry Poppin' Daddies, Frank Black & The Catholics, G. Love and Special Sauce, Jello Biafra, John Mayer, Kenny Wayne Shepherd, Lagwagon, Me First and the Gimme Gimmes, Rise Against, Social Distortion, The Specials, Vanilla Ice, ALL and Ween, among others.
