= Decoy (EP) =

EP by Good Riddance
- Released: August 26, 1995
- Recorded: 1995 at Music Annex
- Genre: Punk rock, pop punk, melodic hardcore
- Length: 7:28
- Label: Fat Wreck Chords (FAT 524)

Good Riddance chronology
For God and Country (1995)	Decoy (1995)	A Comprehensive Guide to Moderne Rebellion (1996)

Decoy is an EP by the Santa Cruz, California-based hardcore punk band Good Riddance. It was released August 26, 1995 through Fat Wreck Chords, six months after their debut album For God and Country, which included the EP's title track, "Decoy". The first two tracks on the EP, "United Cigar" and "12 Year Circus", are taken from the album, while "Free" was previously unreleased. Singer Russ Rankin later remarked that he had written "Free" "as a vehicle with which to lyrically attack two of my favorite targets: pro-lifers and cops. I remember enjoying this song when we played it at shows and it was one of our most requested live songs for a little while after For God and Country came out and a whole slew of new fans bought the Decoy 7-inch after picking up the full length." Decoy was Good Riddance's final release with drummer Rich McDermott, who left the band and was replaced by Sean Sellers.

== Track listing ==
All tracks are written by Good Riddance.

Side A
No.	Title	Length
1.	"United Cigar"	2:46

Side B
No.	Title	Length
1.	"12 Year Circus"	2:45
2.	"Free"	1:57
Total length:		7:28

== Personnel ==
=== Band ===
- Russ Rankin – vocals
- Luke Pabich – guitar
- Chuck Platt – bass guitar
- Rich McDermott – drums

=== Production ===
- Steve Papoutsis – recording engineer
