= Welt (band) =

- Origin: Sacramento, California, U.S.
- Genres: Punk rock
- Years active: 1993-present
- Labels: Doctor Dream Records, Better Youth Organization (BYO) / BYO Records, Island/Mercury, Golf
- Members: Marc Harrismendy; Jason Cooper; Todd Harper; Tobe Bean
- Past members: Cris Swartzlander; Ken Castro

Welt is a punk rock band formed in Sacramento, California in 1993 by Jason Cooper, who has been the only constant member.

== History ==
Welt signed to the Dr. Dream label, releasing the "Lame" single in 1994. The band's debut album, Better Days, was released in 1995. Kicked in the Teeth Again (1996) was seen as a progression. The band relocated to Orange County in 1998, releasing third album Broke Down the same year.

The band underwent several lineup changes prior to the late 1990s. Since then the band has been more stable, with Cooper joined by guitarists Tobe Bean and Todd Harper and drummer Marc Harrismendy. In 2000 the band signed with B.Y.O. Records.

Two of the band's tracks ("Get Lost" and "Broken") were used in the soundtrack of the film 21 (2000), and "The World is Mine" was used in the 2002 film The Skulls II.

In 2009, Cooper released the album The Shop Tapes under the name Jason Welt.

== Discography ==
=== Albums ===
- Better Days (1995), Dr. Dream
- Kicked in the Teeth Again (1996), Dr. Dream
- Broke Down (1998), Dr. Dream
- Brand New Dream (2001), Golf
- Ashes to Ashes (2005), Cider City

Jason Welt

- The Shop Tapes (2009), Cider City

=== Singles ===
- "Lame" (1994), Dr. Dream
- "In My Way" (1994), Face Off
