= Lumberjack Productions =

Lumberjack Productions is a music production company based in East London, established in June 2009 by musicians H.B. Broadbent, B.H. Bhebhe, and A.K. Coney. Work to date includes the track "Love Me Cos You Want To". from the Australian singer-songwriter Gabriella Cilmi's second album release. Ten (Universal Records, 2010). Lumberjack Productions produced "Magic Carpet Ride", the bonus track released by Universal Records as part of Cilmi's UK top ten single "On A Mission".
