= Symptoms of a Leveling Spirit =

Studio album by Good Riddance
- Released: July 10, 2001
- Recorded: February–March 2001 at The Blasting Room, Fort Collins, Colorado
- Genre: Punk rock, melodic hardcore, hardcore punk
- Length: 32:11
- Label: Fat Wreck Chords (FAT 625)
- Producer: Bill Stevenson, Stephen Egerton, Jason Livermore

Good Riddance chronology
The Phenomenon of Craving (2000)	Symptoms of a Leveling Spirit (2001)	Good Riddance / Kill Your Idols (2001)

Symptoms of a Leveling Spirit is the fifth album by the Santa Cruz, California-based hardcore punk band Good Riddance, released July 10, 2001, through Fat Wreck Chords. It was their only release ever to chart, reaching #32 on Billboard's Independent Albums chart. It marked the debut of drummer Dave Wagenschutz with the band; their longtime drummer Sean Sellers had left in early 1999, and Lagwagon drummer Dave Raun had filled in on the 2000 EP The Phenomenon of Craving and on several tours until Wagenschutz, formerly of Kid Dynamite, joined Good Riddance full-time.

== Background ==
Like The Phenomenon of Craving and their previous album Operation Phoenix, Symptoms of a Leveling Spirit was recorded at The Blasting Room in Fort Collins, Colorado with the production team of Bill Stevenson, Stephen Egerton, and Jason Livermore. Singer Russ Rankin later reflected on the album as a high point for the band:

Symptoms of a Leveling Spirit, I think, was our...I think it was the pinnacle, it was definitely the pinnacle for us as far as our career if you just want to go by numbers. Like, the year that that came out, we were in every weekly, all of our shows were bumped up to the bigger rooms, we sold out our whole European tour, and that was about as good as it ever got for us and that was pretty cool for that to happen. Like that record was...I just have a lot of really good memories about that year personally and band-wise...everything just went really really well for us and we had a really successful year, and I still think that record, and to a lesser extent the E.P. that came before it, were where I finally kind of like, found my stride as a song-writer.

Guitarist Luke Pabich stated that the album's title was inspired by a quote from U.S. President James Madison, wherein Madison used the phrase "symptoms of a leveling spirit" to express concerns over the idea of power and equitable wealth distribution benefiting "non-elite citizens" of the U.S.

Rankin, a dedicated fan of the Psychedelic Furs, convinced the rest of the band members to cover one of their songs. Therefore, the album features a cover of "In My Head" by The Psychedelic Furs, a track originally from the 1991 album World Outside, as a hidden track after "Spit You Out".

== Reception ==
Professional ratings
Review scores
Source	Rating
AllMusic	4.5/5 stars
Kerrang!	3/5 stars
Punknews.org	4/5 stars

Reception to Symptoms of a Leveling Spirit was positive. Chris Moran of Punknews.org gave it four stars out of five, calling it "without question, the definitive GR album ... this is not the same 1,000-beats-a-minute GR you've listened to for the last several years." Jo-Ann Greene of Allmusic gave the album four and a half stars out of five, saying that it "finds Good Riddance huddling ever closer to the melodic punk sound they've been moving towards over the few preceding years ... However, the increased tunefulness takes none of the bite out of Good Riddance's lyrics. And whether attacking individual imperfections or greater societal ills, the group's songwriting remains savagely on point. Always threatening greatness, the group have now produced a true classic."

== Track listing ==
All tracks are written by Russ Rankin, except where noted.

No.	Title	Length
1.	"Fire Engine Red" (lyrics: Rankin; music: Luke Pabich)	2:09
2.	"Enter the Unapproachables" (lyrics: Rankin; music: Pabich)	1:35
3.	"Yesterday's Headlines"	2:26
4.	"Great Leap Forward"	1:35
5.	"Cheyenne"	2:19
6.	"Libertine"	1:54
7.	"Trial of the Century"	2:25
8.	"Nobody Likes a Cynic"	2:52
9.	"Year of the Rat" (contains a dialogue excerpt from the film The Hunt for Red October)	2:16
10.	"Pisces/Almost Home"	2:08
11.	"Defusing the Popular Struggle"	2:18
12.	"All the Joy You've Ever Known" (lyrics: Rankin; music: Chuck Platt)	0:42
13.	"Blue Black Eyes"	2:13
14.	"Spit You Out" (lyrics: Rankin; music: Pabich) "In My Head" (hidden track; written and originally performed by The Psychedelic Furs)	5:19
Total length:		32:11

== Personnel ==
- Russ Rankin – vocals
- Luke Pabich – guitar
- Chuck Platt – bass guitar
- Dave Wagenschutz – drums
- Bill Stevenson – producer, recording and mix engineer
- Stephen Egerton – producer, recording and mix engineer
- Jason Livermore – producer, recording and mix engineer, mastering

== Appearances in media ==
- "Fire Engine Red" was used as a soundtrack for the 2002 motocross videogame Big Air Freestyle.
