= Ballads from the Revolution =

Studio album by Good Riddance
- Released: February 10, 1998
- Recorded: October 1997 at Motor Studios, San Francisco
- Genre: Punk rock, pop punk, melodic hardcore, skate punk, post-hardcore
- Length: 33:39
- Label: Fat Wreck Chords (FAT 565)
- Producer: Ryan Greene, Good Riddance

Good Riddance chronology
Good Riddance / Ensign (1997)	Ballads from the Revolution (1998)	Operation Phoenix (1999)

Ballads from the Revolution is the third album by the Santa Cruz, California-based hardcore punk band Good Riddance, released February 10, 1998 through Fat Wreck Chords.

== Reception ==
Andy Hinds of Allmusic rated Ballads from the Revolution four and a half stars out of five, remarking that Good Riddance "play harder, louder and faster — the tunes detonate, one after another, like a volley of mortar fire. Still, the band know how to incorporate pure pop sweetness into their relentless assault without ever coming close to cheesiness".

== Track listing ==
All lyrics are written by Russ Rankin; all music is composed by Russ Rankin, except where noted.

No.	Title	Writer(s)	Length
1.	"Fertile Fields" (contains dialogue excerpt from Sudden Impact)	Luke Pabich	2:08
2.	"Sacrifice"	Chuck Platt	1:19
3.	"State Control"	Luke Pabich	1:23
4.	"Jeannie"		2:09
5.	"Salt"		1:49
6.	"Choices Made"		1:16
7.	"Not with Him"		2:10
8.	"Understood" (contains dialogue excerpt from Kingpin)	Luke Pabich	1:48
9.	"Waste" (contains dialogue excerpt from Matinee)		1:59
10.	"Slowly"		2:30
11.	"Without Anger"		1:33
12.	"Holding On" (contains dialogue excerpt from the film Peggy Sue Got Married)		2:12
13.	"Eversmile"		1:10
14.	"I.S.Y.L." ("I Stole Your Love", originally performed by Kiss)	Paul Stanley	2:37
15.	"Years from Now" "Hidden Track" (contains dialogue excerpt from "The Warrior's Prayer" by Manowar)		7:36
Total length:			33:39

== Personnel ==
- Russ Rankin – vocals
- Luke Pabich – guitar
- Chuck Platt – bass guitar
- Sean Sellers – drums
- Ryan Greene – producer, recording engineer, mix engineer
- Adam Krammer – assistant engineer
