= Operation Phoenix (album) =

Studio album by Good Riddance
- Released: May 4, 1999
- Recorded: February 1999 at The Blasting Room, Fort Collins, Colorado
- Genre: Hardcore punk, melodic hardcore, punk rock, post-hardcore
- Length: 39:25
- Label: Fat Wreck Chords (FAT 587)
- Producer: Bill Stevenson, Stephen Egerton, Jason Livermore

Good Riddance chronology
Ballads from the Revolution (1998)	Operation Phoenix (1999)	The Phenomenon of Craving (2000)

Operation Phoenix is the fourth album by the Santa Cruz, California-based hardcore punk band Good Riddance, released May 4, 1999 through Fat Wreck Chords. It marked a change in recording location and production team for the band: their previous three albums had been recorded in San Francisco with producer and recording engineer Ryan Greene, but for Operation Phoenix the band traveled to Fort Collins, Colorado to record at The Blasting Room with Jason Livermore and Descendents/All members Bill Stevenson and Stephen Egerton. This marked the beginning of a long-term working relationship: Good Riddance would record all of their studio material at The Blasting Room using the same production team. Rankin later commented that working with The Blasting Room team was a major turning point in recording for the band:

We did our first three albums with Ryan Greene and Ryan Greene is a great engineer and a really great guy and we learned a lot about being prepared to record ... his studio know-how was top-notch, his demeanor was top-notch, and we learned a lot, but when we decided we wanted a change, and we went to the Blasting Room, it was like...so different ... they knew what we were trying to do ... Also, the way they recorded...it was completely out of the ordinary...we'd been through the culture where you'd lay down the drums first, then you lay down the bass, then you lay down the guitars, and then you do the vocals...and we get to the Blasting Room and once the drums were done it was like, all bets are off, Chuck [Platt, bassist] would go in for a couple hours, then I would go in, then Luke [Pabich, guitarist] would go in, and we'd just be chipping away at these songs ... it was definitely a new approach for us anyway, we'd never done anything like that before...so I think that those guys really brought out the best in us, they challenged us, but they also, I think, had a really innate sense of knowing what we were trying to get done.

Operation Phoenix was Good Riddance's last album with drummer Sean Sellers until 2006. Following his departure in late 1999, Lagwagon drummer Dave Raun filled in with the band until Dave Wagenschutz of Kid Dynamite joined as a permanent replacement. Sellers would return to Good Riddance in 2006.

== Reception ==
Steve Huey of Allmusic gave Operation Phoenix three stars out of five, remarking that the album "doesn't deviate much from Good Riddance's established pattern of stinging melodic punk and raging socially conscious lyrics, but it's a fine, well-executed take on that formula that ranks with the best of their work."

== Track listing ==
All tracks are written by Russ Rankin, except where noted.

No.	Title	Length
1.	"Shadows of Defeat" (contains an excerpt from a February 1967 speech given by Martin Luther King Jr.)	2:12
2.	"Blueliner"	1:38
3.	"The Hardest Part"	1:43
4.	"Eighteen Seconds"	0:30
5.	"Heresy, Hypocrisy, and Revenge" (lyrics: Rankin; music: Luke Pabich; contains a dialogue excerpt from the film Some Kind of Wonderful)	2:21
6.	"Self-Fulfilling Catastrophe"	2:06
7.	"Article IV" (contains an excerpt from Mario Savio's "Bodies upon the gears" speech and a quote by Ronald Reagan)	2:59
8.	"Indoctrination"	1:09
9.	"Shit-Talking Capitalists"	1:26
10.	"Letters Home"	2:22
11.	"30 Day Wonder" (lyrics: Rankin; music: Pabich)	1:52
12.	"Dear Cammi"	1:04
13.	"Yesterday Died – Tomorrow Won't Be Born"	1:38
14.	"Winning the Hearts and Minds" (contains an excerpt from Noam Chomsky's "Propaganda model in media analysis" speech)	2:19
15.	"A Time and a Place"	1:50
16.	"Second Coming" (originally performed by Battalion of Saints)	1:26
17.	"After the Nightmare" (lyrics: Rankin; music: Pabich) "My War" (hidden track; written by Chuck Dukowski and originally performed by Black Flag)	10:50
Total length:		39:25

== Personnel ==
Good Riddance

- Russ Rankin – Vocals, bass guitar on "My War"
- Luke Pabich – Guitar
- Chuck Platt – Bass guitar, backing vocals (excluding "My War")
- Sean Sellers – Drums (excluding "My War")

Artwork

- Sean Sellers – Cover art concept
- Eli Atkins – Design

Additional musicians

- Bill Stevenson – Drums and additional guitar on "My War"
- Chuck Division – Additional bass guitar

Production

- Bill Stevenson – Producer, engineering and mixing
- Stephen Egerton – Producer, recording and mix engineer
- Jason Livermore – Producer, recording and mixing
