= A Comprehensive Guide to Moderne Rebellion =

Studio album by Good Riddance
- Released: June 4, 1996
- Recorded: Razor's Edge Studios, San Francisco
- Genre: Punk rock, melodic hardcore, skate punk, post-hardcore
- Length: 37:27
- Label: Fat Wreck Chords (FAT 539)
- Producer: Ryan Greene, Good Riddance

Good Riddance chronology
Decoy (1995)	A Comprehensive Guide to Moderne Rebellion (1996)	Good Riddance / Reliance (1996)

A Comprehensive Guide to Moderne Rebellion is the second album by the Santa Cruz, California-based hardcore punk band Good Riddance, released June 4, 1996, through Fat Wreck Chords. It was the band's first album with drummer Sean Sellers, replacing Rich McDermott who had left the group. The album includes two cover songs, of The Kinks' "Come Dancing" and Government Issue's "Hall of Fame", the latter included as a hidden track. "Last Believer" was titled after an episode of the 1991 PBS documentary series on President Lyndon B. Johnson; the song had previously been released on the band's debut EP Gidget in 1993 and was re-recorded for A Comprehensive Guide to Moderne Rebellion.

Singer Russ Rankin later remarked that "I think [A Comprehensive Guide to Moderne Rebellion] is important because that's when I found out that I was a song-writer ... [it] was where I realized like, 'Hey I guess I'm the song writer for this band'".

Seven songs written during the demo sessions for A Comprehensive Guide to Moderne Rebellion were left off of the album. These tracks—"Remember When", "Flawed", "Class War 2000", "Twenty-One Guns", "Lame Duck Arsenal", "Off the Wagon", and "What We Have"—were recorded in a separate session with Andy Ernst at Art of Ears and released on split EPs with Reliance, Ignite, Ill Repute, and Ensign through other record labels over the following year.

== Reception ==
Andy Hinds of Allmusic rated A Comprehensive Guide to Moderne Rebellion four stars out of five, remarking that "the band have improved their songwriting chops considerably, finally bringing the music up to the level of Russ Rankin's always powerful lyrics".

== Track listing ==
All tracks are written by Russ Rankin, except where noted.

No.	Title	Length
1.	"Weight of the World" (lyrics: Rankin; music: Luke Pabich; contains dialogue from the film They Live)	2:08
2.	"Steps"	2:14
3.	"A Credit to His Gender"	2:46
4.	"Trophy" (lyrics: Rankin; music: Pabich)	0:35
5.	"Up & Away"	2:03
6.	"Last Believer" (lyrics: Rankin; music: Pabich)	2:33
7.	"Static"	2:48
8.	"Favorite Son"	1:21
9.	"West End Memorial"	2:29
10.	"This Is the Light"	3:18
11.	"Bittersweet" (lyrics: Rankin; music: Pabich)	1:47
12.	"Token Idiot"	1:38
13.	"Come Dancing" (Ray Davies; originally performed by The Kinks)	2:21
14.	"Lampshade"	1:33
15.	"Think of Me"	2:08
16.	"The Sky Is Falling" (lyrics: Rankin; music: Pabich)	0:45
17.	"Sometimes" "Hall of Fame" (hidden track; written by John Stabb, Tom Lyle, Mitch Parker, and Marc Alberstadt and originally performed by Government Issue)	5:47
Total length:		37:27

== Personnel ==
- Russ Rankin – vocals, additional guitar on "Come Dancing"
- Luke Pabich – guitar
- Chuck Platt – bass guitar
- Sean Sellers – drums
- Cinder Block – female vocals on "A Credit to His Gender"
- Ryan Greene – producer, recording engineer, mix engineer
