= Ill Repute =

American hardcore punk band

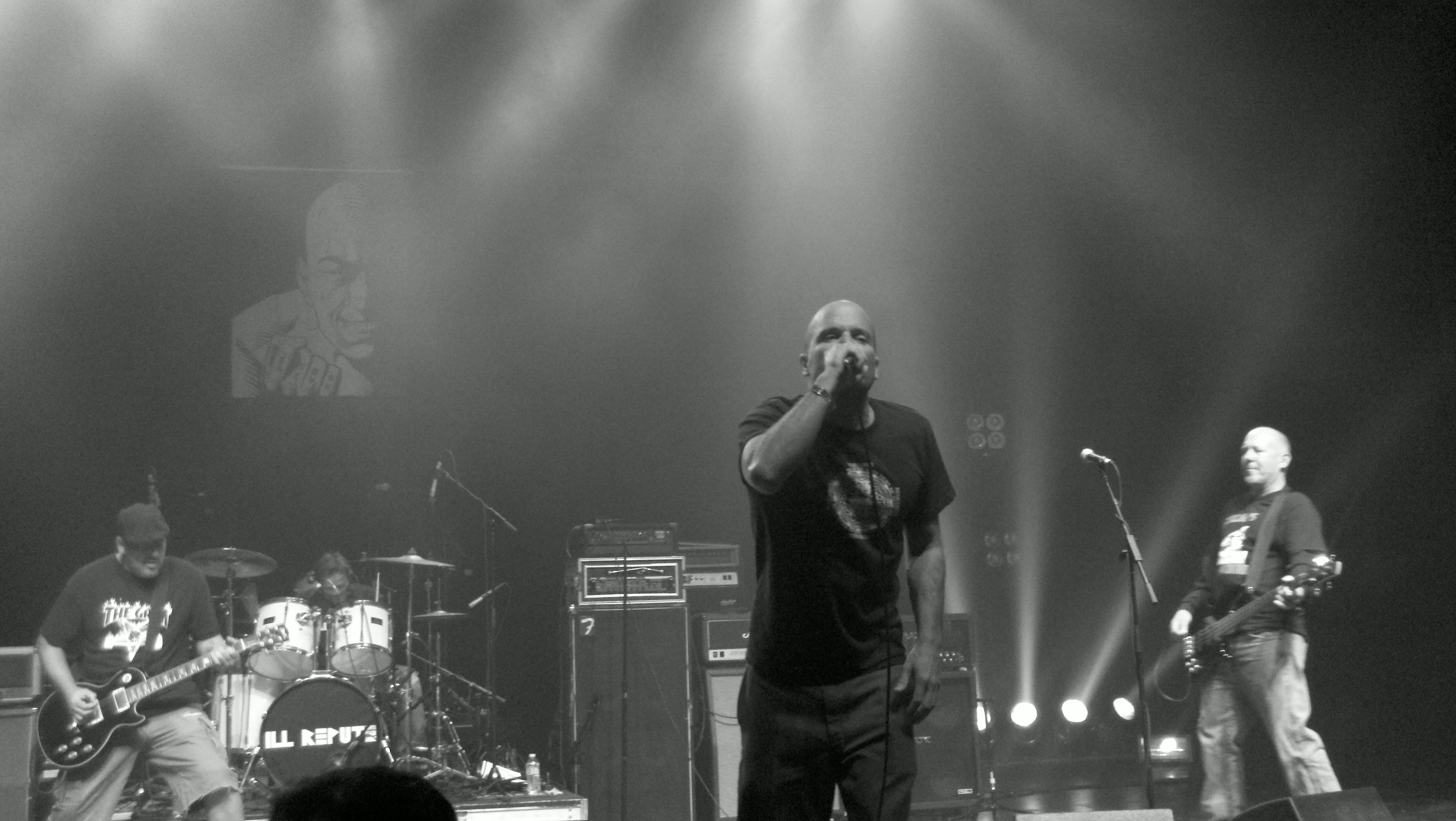
- Left to right: Cortez, Shultz, Phaneuf, and Callahan in 2011

Background information
- Origin: Oxnard, California, United States
- Genres: Hardcore punk, nardcore, skate punk
- Years active: 1981–present
- Labels: Mystic Records, Dr. Strange Records, Mankind Records
- Members: John Phaneuf; Tony Cortez; Jim Callahan; Chuck Shultz
- Past members: Carl Valdez; Chris McKee; Joe Rivas; Forrest Lorenzana; Nashia; Joe Libke

Ill Repute is an American hardcore punk band from Oxnard, California, United States, formed in 1981. They are noted for popularizing the "Nardcore" sound in the mid-1980s hardcore punk scene, and recorded for Mystic Records.

They first broke into the scene with their recording "Clean Cut American Kid" on Poshboy Records for Rodney on the ROQ, Volume III. ROTR III also featured the Vandals, Channel 3, and the Bangles. "Clean Cut American Kid" would be played on radio stations around the world and is now featured on the Netflix streaming show "Stranger Things".

Their record What Happens Next? (What Happened Then? on CD) holds high status in hardcore circles. It is notable for its cover of the 1970s pop music hit "Indian Reservation (The Lament of the Cherokee Reservation Indian)" (aka "The Pale Faced Indian", aka ""Indian Reservation", aka "Cherokee Nation"). On the Ill Repute record, the cover song version uses the "Cherokee Nation" version of the song title.

The lead guitarist, Tony Cortez (original band member) is considered the "Mayor of Nardcore."

Ill Repute reformed with original members, (except Carl Valdez replaced by Chuck Shultz)

Before a standing-room-only crowd in the City Council Chambers of Port Hueneme, Ill Repute was presented a Proclamation from then-Mayor Jonathan Sharkey on April 7, 2014, for "their revolutionary musical talent". Later in 2014, they were inducted into the Ventura County Music Awards Hall of Fame.

The documentary DVD/book, Clean Cut American Kids - the Story of Ill Repute, was also released in 2014 by True Underground Network Publishing in association with Firehook Entertainment and Canadian Bacon Films.

== Ill Repute original lineup ==
- John Phaneuf - Vocals
- Tony Cortez - Guitar
- Jimmy Callahan - Bass
- Carl Valdez - Drums

== Discography ==
- Oxnard - Land of No Toilets 7-inch, Mystic 1983 M33129
- It Came from Slimey Valley, V/A, LP Ghetto Way 1983 GTO33001
- Rodney on the Roq: Volume 3, V/A, LP 1983 Posh Boy PBS 140
- We Got Power - Party or Go Home, V/A, LP Mystic 1983 MLP33125
- What Happens Next 12-inch, Mystic 1984 M124518
- Nardcore Compilation LP, Mystic 1984 MLP33135
- Halloween Live at Mystic 7-inch, Mystic 1984 M7EP140
- Halloween Live at Mystic 2 7” Mystic 1984 M7EP141
- Mystic Sampler 1, V/A, LP Mystic 1984 MLP33126
- COPulation - The Sound of Hollywood, V/A, Mystic 1984 MLP33128
- Covers, V/A, LP Mystic 1985 MLP33132
- Let’s Die, V/A LP Mystic 1985 MLP33131
- Mystic Sampler 2, V/A LP Mystic 1985 MLP33127
- Mystic Super Seven Sampler 1, V/A, 7-inch, Mystic 1985 M7EP139
- We Got Power 2 - Party Animal, V/A LP Mystic 1985 MLP33137
- Omelette LP, Mystic 1985 MLP33139
- Mystic Sampler 3, V/A LP Mystic 1986 MLP33147
- Mystic Super Seven Sampler LP 12-inch Mystic 1987 MLP33140
- Transition LP, Mystic 1989 MLP33170
- Big Rusty Balls CD, Dr. Strange Records 1994 DSR16
- "One Big Happy Slam Pit, V/A, LP Spider Club Music 1996 SCM40002-1
- Localism... A Comp of Bands from the Oxnard, California Area, V/A LP It’s Alive Records 1996 IAR-4
- It's Only Fun Till Someone Gets Hurt! split 7-inch w/ Good Riddance, It's Alive Records 1997 IAR5
- Positive Charged CD, GTA 1997 GTA030
- BLEED CD, Edge Records 1997
- And Now... CD, Edge Records 1998
- As A Matter of Fact split CD w/ Good Riddance, The Almighty Trigger Happy, & Satanic Surfers, Bad Taste Records 1998 BTR22 and Fearless Records FO35
- City Rockers: A Tribute to the Clash, V/A CD CHORD Records 1999 CR30
- "Absolute Pleasure: A Tribute to Rocky Horror, V/A, Center of the World Records 1999 COTW004
- We’ll Get Back at Them Indecision Records 1999 IND18.5,
- What Happened Then? Mystic Records CD 2000 MCD182, CD, LP 2008
- LIVE CD, Let Them Eat Records 2005 LTER2495-4
- Welcome to the Neighborhood Compilation CD, Let Them Eat Records 2005 LTER2495-3
- Nardcore - 30 Years Later V/A, LP/CD, Burning Tree Records 2009 BTR13
- Best of Ill Repute CD Mystic 2011 MCD169
- The 1982 Demos LP Mankind Records 2015 MKD11
