= Good Riddance (band) =

American punk rock band

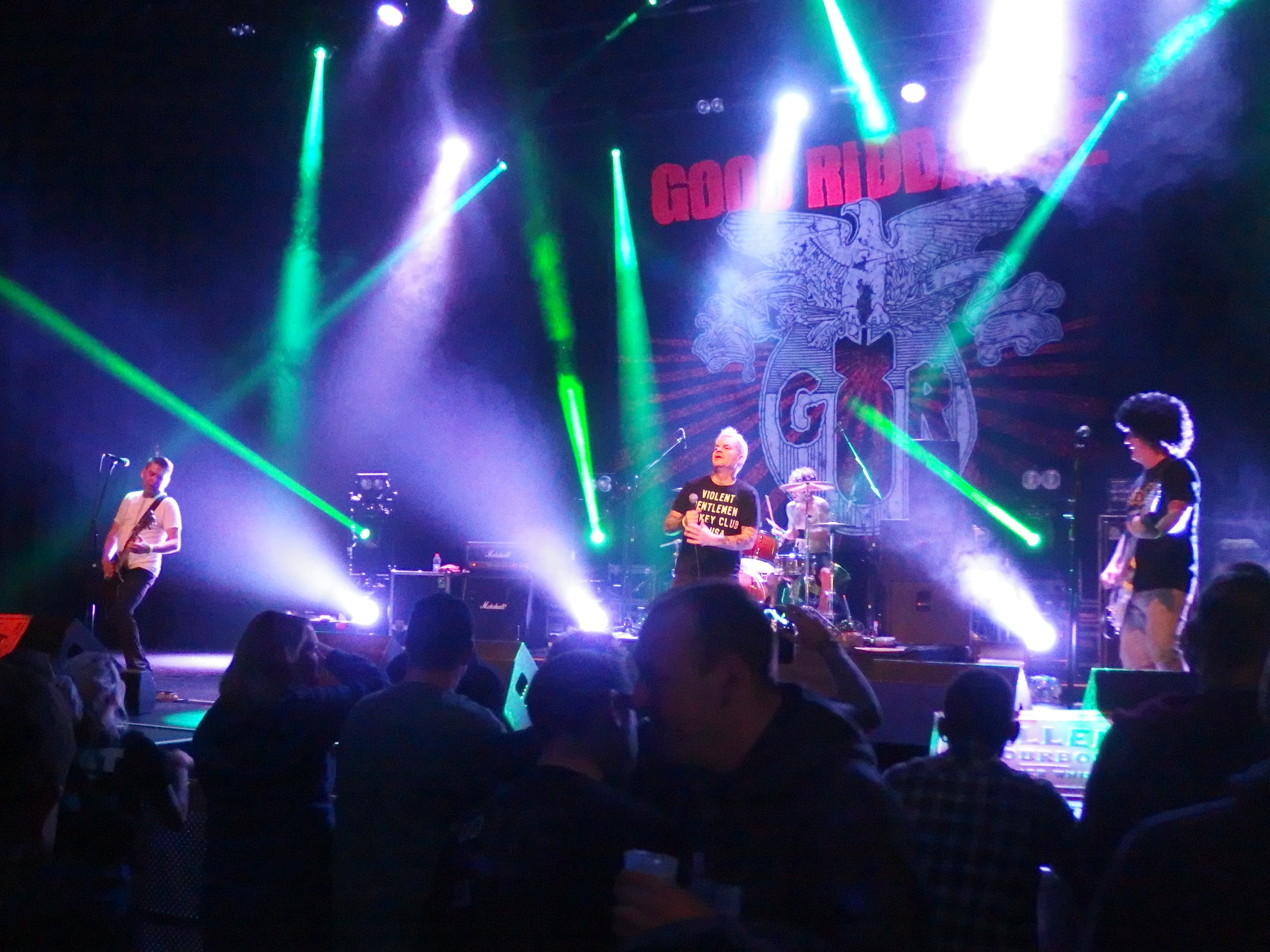
- Good Riddance in 2019

Background information
- Origin: Santa Cruz, California, U.S.
- Genres: Melodic hardcore, pop punk, skate punk, hardcore punk
- Works: Discography
- Years active: 1986–2007; 2012–present
- Labels: Fat Wreck Chords, Lorelei, Little Deputy, Revelation, Jade Tree, It's Alive, Orphaned
- Members: Russ Rankin; Luke Pabich; Chuck Platt; Sean Sellers

Good Riddance (sometimes abbreviated GR) is an American punk rock band from Santa Cruz, California. They released seven full-length studio albums on Fat Wreck Chords, then disbanded after releasing a live recording of their farewell concert in 2007. They reformed in 2012 and released an eighth studio album, Peace in Our Time, in 2015. The band released Thoughts and Prayers, their ninth full-length album, on July 19, 2019. Led by vocalist Russ Rankin, the band's longtime lineup includes guitarist Luke Pabich, bassist Chuck Platt, and drummer Sean "SC" Sellers. Their sound is influenced by the hardcore punk scene and the band was known for their combination of fast punk with catchy melodies. Lyrical themes vary from political protests and critical analyses of American society to personal struggles and alienation.

== History ==
=== State of Grace ===
Prior to Good Riddance, in the early 1990s Russ Rankin and Luke Pabich were members of Santa Cruz hardcore band State of Grace. State of Grace released one demo cassette, approximately 31 minutes long, in 1992; the nine tracks were recorded at "Lumberjack Studios" in "Haward" (presumably Hayward, California). They subsequently played dates on two short tours.

=== Good Riddance ===
Good Riddance was founded in 1986 by singer Russ Rankin, but did not coalesce into a functioning band until the addition of guitarist Luke Pabich several years later. With bassist Devin Quinn and drummer Rich McDermott the band released its debut EP, Gidget, in 1993 through Austin, Texas record label Little Deputy Records.

Devin Quinn left and was temporarily replaced by Tom Kennedy before Chuck Platt joined as the band's permanent bassist.

Good Riddance signed to Fat Wreck Chords, releasing their debut album For God and Country and the Decoy EP in 1995.

Rich McDermott left and was replaced by Sean Sellers for 1996's A Comprehensive Guide to Moderne Rebellion.

Sellers would continue to drum for Good Riddance until December 1999, a few month before the 2000 E.P. The Phenomenon of Craving, which was recorded with Dave Raun from Lagwagon/RKL. Dave Wagenschutz, best known as the drummer for New Jersey melodic hardcore band Lifetime, then joined the band and recorded the next two albums and toured with Good Riddance. Sellers would later rejoin the band to play on their seventh studio record, "My Republic" in 2006, and on their farewell live record, Remain In Memory - The Final Show in 2007.

Every member of the band supports animal rights and is either vegan or vegetarian. The band is a vocal supporter of People for the Ethical Treatment of Animals and the United States Green Party.

All of the members have played in other projects: Pabich and Sellers in Outlie, Platt in "I Want Out" and Rankin in Only Crime. Sellers also plays drums in Celtic punk band, The Real McKenzies.

The band have been influential with their combination of Skate Punk and 80s Hardcore Punk, influencing bands such as Phinius Gage and No Trigger.

On April 3, 2007, the band announced their break-up, and played their final show on May 27, 2007 in their hometown of Santa Cruz, California at The Catalyst. This show was recorded and released as Remain in Memory - The Final Show.

==== 2012 Reunion ====
On February 16, 2012, Good Riddance announced on their website that they had reunited, with their usual lineup (Rankin, Pabich, Platt and Sellers).

Peace in Our Time, the eighth studio album and first since their 2007 breakup and 2012 reunion was released April 21, 2015 through Fat Wreck Chords.

On July 19, 2019, Good Riddance released their ninth studio album Thoughts and Prayers through Fat Wreck Chords.

On March 27, 2026, the band released their tenth studio album Before the World Caves In through Fat Wreck Chords.

== Band members ==
=== Current ===
- Russ Rankin – vocals (1986–2007, 2012–present)
- Luke Pabich – guitar (1990–2007, 2012–present)
- Chuck Platt – bass guitar (1994–2007, 2012–present)
- Sean Sellers – drums (1996–1999, 2006–2007, 2012–present)

=== Former ===
- Rob Land – guitar (1986–1990)
- John Burnett – bass (1986–1991)
- Devin Quinn – bass (1991–1993)
- Tom Kennedy – bass (1993–1994)
- Rich McDermott – drums (1986–1989, 1993–1995)
- Andrew Jackson – drums (1990–1991)
- Jade Dylan – drums (1991–1993)
- Dave Raun – drums (1999–2000)
- David Wagenschutz – drums (2000–2005)

== Discography ==
Studio albums

- For God and Country (1995)
- A Comprehensive Guide to Moderne Rebellion (1996)
- Ballads from the Revolution (1998)
- Operation Phoenix (1999)
- Symptoms of a Leveling Spirit (2001)
- Bound by Ties of Blood and Affection (2003)
- My Republic (2006)
- Peace in Our Time (2015)
- Thoughts and Prayers (2019)
- Before the World Caves In (2026)

== Videography ==
- Exposed! 1994-1999 VHS (Fat Wreck Chords, July 31, 2001)
