= Russ Rankin =

American singer

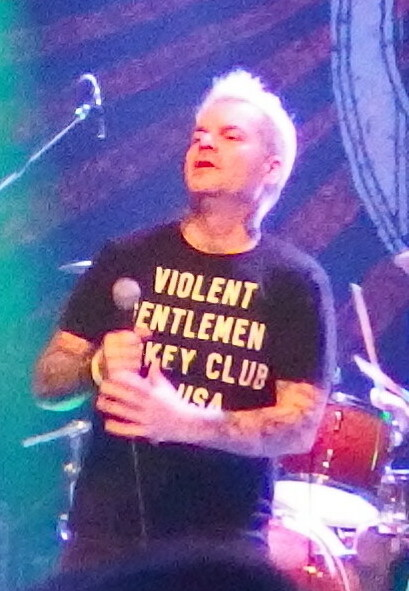
- Rankin in 2019

Background information
- Birth name: Russell Chapin Rankin
- Born: May 25, 1968 (age 56); Santa Cruz, California, U.S.
- Genres: Punk rock, pop punk, melodic hardcore, skate punk, hardcore punk, heavy metal
- Occupation(s): Singer, songwriter, record producer, scout, writer
- Years active: 1990–present

Russ Rankin (born May 25, 1968) is an American musician, best known as the singer for the punk rock bands Good Riddance and Only Crime.

== Career ==
Rankin is the lead vocalist for melodic hardcore band Only Crime, Creep Division, and punk rock band Good Riddance. Both bands were signed to Fat Wreck Chords until Good Riddance announced their breakup on April 3, 2007. However, as of February 2012, Good Riddance has reformed. Rankin was also a member of Fury 66 and State of Grace. He has also lent his voice to songs by Rise Against, Ensign, Comeback Kid. Additionally, Rankin spends time producing bands. Most recently, he performed a cover of the Johnny Cash song "Walk the Line" for a punk rock tribute album entitled All Aboard: A Tribute to Johnny Cash. Rankin appeared in the independent documentary, Meditate and Destroy, that focuses on Dharma Punx author Noah Levine. Along with his band Good Riddance, they can be seen in the film performing at the Catalyst club in Santa Cruz, California.

In 2012, Rankin released his debut solo album Farewell Catalonia on Paper + Plastick Records.

== Personal life and activism ==
Russ Rankin has been outspoken about his political stances and done many charity actions. Particularly with Good Riddance, he has participated in benefit concerts, donated a portion of their records sales and distributed animal rights literature at their live shows. He became a vegetarian in the early 1990s and has been a vegan since 1993. Rankin has been straight edge since 1987. According to Buddhist teacher and author Noah Levine, Rankin "spends most of his time these days touring internationally and spreading political and spiritual awareness through his lyrics."

In addition to music, Rankin is a hockey scout. Currently, he is the California/Western United States Regional scout for the Tri City Americans, a hockey team that competes in the Western Hockey League. Rankin held the same position with the Kootenay Ice from 2007 to 2012, and was on staff when Kootenay won the WHL Championship in 2011.

He has contributed writing to magazines such as AMP, New Noise, Alternative Press, Razorcake, and The Washington Times.

== Discography ==
=== Solo albums ===
- Farewell Catalonia (2012)
- Come Together Fall Apart (2022)

=== Compilation appearances ===
- All Aboard: A Tribute to Johnny Cash (2008)
  - Includes "I Walk the Line"
- Untitled 21: A Juvenile Tribute To Swingin' Utters (2010)
  - Includes "Beached Sailor"
- Respect Your Roots Worldwide (2013)
  - Includes "I Am On Fire"
- The Songs of Tony Sly: A Tribute (2013)
  - Digital version includes "Via Munich"

=== With State of Grace ===
- Demo (1992)

=== With Fury 66 ===
- Demo (1994)
- American Clown EP (1994)

=== With Creep Division ===
- Creep Division (2000)

=== With Only Crime ===
- To the Nines (2004)
- Virulence (2007)
- Only Crime and Outbreak EP (2007)
- Pursuance (2014)

=== Guest appearances ===
- Rise Against – The Unraveling (2001)
  - Backing vocals on "Weight of Time"
- Ensign – The Price of Progression (2001)
  - Vocals on "Foot in Mouth as an Artform"
- Comeback Kid – Wake the Dead (2005)
  - Additional vocals on "Our Distance"
- Bullet Treatment – Designated Vol. 1 (2009)
  - Vocals on "Win the Day"
- Give You Nothing – Give You Nothing (2019)
  - Additional vocals on "Clean Slate"
