= Descendents discography =

Band discography

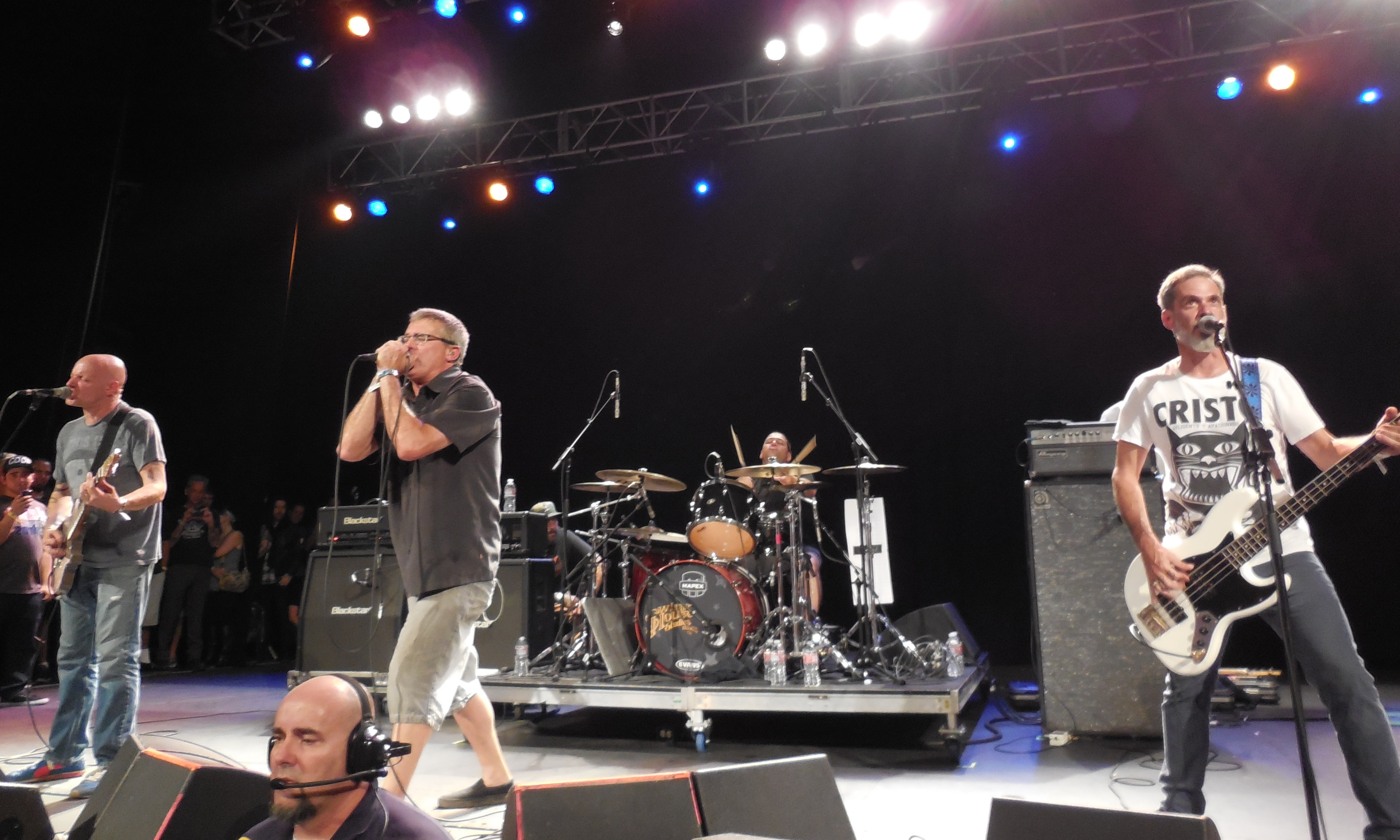
- The Descendents in 2014. Left to right: Egerton, Aukerman, Stevenson, and Alvarez.
- Studio albums: 8
- Extended plays: 3
- Live albums: 3
- Compilation albums: 3
- Singles: 3
- Music videos: 5
- Other appearances: 3

The discography of the Descendents, a punk rock band formed in Manhattan Beach, California in 1977, consists of eight studio albums, three live albums, three compilation albums, three EPs, several singles, and four music videos.

The Descendents' initial lineup of Frank Navetta (guitar), Tony Lombardo (bass guitar), and Bill Stevenson (drums) released the band's first single, "Ride the Wild" / "It's a Hectic World" in 1980. Adding singer Milo Aukerman, they next released the Fat EP in 1981 and their debut album Milo Goes to College in 1982 through New Alliance. The band took a hiatus during Aukerman's collegiate studies, reconvening in 1985 for I Don't Want to Grow Up with guitarist Ray Cooper replacing Navetta. That same year New Alliance issued the compilation Bonus Fat, combining the Fat EP with the band's first single. Doug Carrion had replaced Lombardo by 1986's Enjoy!, but both he and Cooper soon left the band and were replaced by Karl Alvarez and Stephen Egerton, respectively.

In 1987 New Alliance was absorbed by SST Records, who reissued the Descendents' previous material and released their fourth album, All. Aukerman then departed the Descendents to pursue a career in biochemistry. Stevenson, Egerton, and Alvarez changed the name of the band to All, releasing eight albums between 1988 and 1995 with singers Dave Smalley, Scott Reynolds, and Chad Price. Following the Descendents' breakup, SST released the live albums Liveage! (1987) and Hallraker: Live! (1989) and the compilation albums Two Things at Once (1988) and Somery (1991).

Aukerman continued to contribute occasional songwriting and backing vocals to All following his departure from the Descendents, and in 1995 decided to return to music. The band members decided to operate simultaneously as two bands, performing with Aukerman as the Descendents and with Price as All. Both bands signed to Epitaph Records, with the Descendents releasing Everything Sucks in 1996. It became their first album to chart, reaching #132 on the Billboard 200, and was supported by singles and music videos for "I'm the One" and "When I Get Old". The Descendents took another hiatus while Aukerman returned to his biochemistry career, and All released two more studio albums in 1998 and 1999. In 2001 Epitaph released Live Plus One, a double live album with one disc by All and the other by the Descendents, which reached #45 on Billboard's Top Independent Albums chart. The Descendents reconvened for 2004's Cool to Be You, released by Fat Wreck Chords, which reached #143 on the Billboard 200 and #6 amongst independent albums. In 2002 the original lineup of Stevenson, Naveta, and Lombardo rejoined to record 9th and Walnut, the album contained songs that they had previously written but had never been recorded, it wasn’t until 2020 that Aukerman recorded vocals for the album. In 2021 the album was released.

== Studio albums ==
List of studio albums
Title	Album details	Peak chart positions		
Title	Album details	US		
Title	Album details	Billboard 200	Independent	Heatseekers
Milo Goes to College	Released: September 4, 1982; Label: New Alliance (NAR-012); Format: CD, CS, DL, LP	—	—	—
I Don't Want to Grow Up	Released: May 15, 1985; Label: New Alliance (NAR-026); Formats CD, CS, DL, LP	—	—	—
Enjoy!	Released: July 15, 1986; Label: New Alliance (NAR-029); Format: CD, CS, DL, LP	—	—	—
All	Released: June 16, 1987; Label: SST (SST-112); Format: CD, CS, DL, LP	—	—	—
Everything Sucks	Released: September 24, 1996; Label: Epitaph (E-86481); Format: CD, CS, DL, LP	132	—	4
Cool to Be You	Released: March 23, 2004; Label: Fat Wreck Chords (FAT-672); Format: CD, DL, LP	143	6	4
Hypercaffium Spazzinate	Released: July 29, 2016; Label: Epitaph; Formats CD, DL, LP	20	1	—
9th & Walnut	Released: July 23, 2021; Label: Epitaph; Formats CD, DL, LP	173	—	—
"—" denotes a release that did not chart.

== Live albums ==
List of live albums
Title	Album details	Peak chart positions
Title	Album details	US
Title	Album details	Independent
Liveage!	Released: November 4, 1987; Label: SST (SST-163); Format: CD, CS, DL, LP	—
Hallraker: Live!	Released: January 10, 1989; Label: SST (SST-205); Format: CD, CS, DL, LP	—
Live Plus One	Released: August 21, 2001; Label: Epitaph (E-86618); Format: CD, DL	45
"—" denotes a release that did not chart.

== Compilation albums ==
List of compilation albums
Title	Album details
Bonus Fat	Released: 1985; Label: New Alliance (NAR-025); Format: CD, CS, DL, 12" vinyl
Two Things at Once	Released: 1988; Label: SST (SST-145); Format: CD, CS, DL
Somery	Released: July 16, 1991; Label: SST (SST-259); Format: CD, CS, DL, LP

== EPs ==
List of extended plays
Title	EP details	Peak chart positions	
Title	EP details	US	
Title	EP details	Independent	Heatseekers
Fat EP	Released: 1981; Label: New Alliance (NAR-005); Format: CD, 7" vinyl	—	—
Sessions	Released: 1997; Label: Sessions (SES-007); Format: 7" vinyl	—	—
'Merican	Released: February 10, 2004; Label: Fat Wreck Chords (FAT-671); Format: CD, 7" vinyl	29	38
Spazzhazard	Released: July 29, 2016; Label: Epitaph; Format: 12" vinyl	—	—
"—" denotes a release that did not chart.

== Singles ==
Year	Details	Album
1980	"Ride the Wild" / "It's a Hectic World": Released: 1980; Label: Orca; Formal: 7" vinyl	Non-album single
1986	"Enjoy": Released: 17 June 2016; Label: New Alliance Records; Format: 7" vinyl	Enjoy!
1987	"Clean Sheets" / "Coolidge": Released: 17 June 1987; Label: SST; Format: 7" vinyl	All
1997	"I'm the One": Released: 1997; Label: Epitaph; Format: CD, 7" vinyl	Everything Sucks
1997	"When I Get Old": Released: 1997; Label: Epitaph; Format: CD, 7" vinyl	Everything Sucks
2016	"Victim of Me": Released: 17 June 2016; Label: Epitaph; Format: Digital	Hypercaffium Spazzinate
2016	"Without Love": Released: 11 July 2016; Label: Epitaph; Format: Digital	Hypercaffium Spazzinate
2017	"Who We Are": Released: 22 June 2017; Label: Epitaph; Format: 7" vinyl	Non-album single
2020	"Suffrage": Released: 27 October 2020; Label: Epitaph; Format: 7" vinyl	Non-album single
2021	"That's The Breaks": Released: 14 January 2021; Label: Epitaph; Format: Digital	Non-album single
2021	"Baby Doncha Know": Released: 4 May 2021; Label: Epitaph; Format: Digital	9th & Walnut
2021	"Nightage": Released: 2 June 2021; Label: Epitaph; Format: Digital	9th & Walnut
2021	"Like The Way I Know": Released: 28 June 2018; Label: Epitaph; Format: Digital	9th & Walnut

== Music videos ==
Year	Song	Director	Album
1986	"Kids"		Enjoy!
1997	"I'm the One"	Dave Robinson	Everything Sucks
1997	"When I Get Old"	Dave Robinson	Everything Sucks
1997	"Lucky"	Darren Doane	Godmoney Motion Picture Soundtrack
2017	"No Fat Burger"	Vitor Cervi	Hypercaffium Spazzinate
2017	"Without Love"		Hypercaffium Spazzinate

== Other appearances ==
The following Descendents songs were released on compilation albums, soundtracks, and other releases. This is not an exhaustive list; songs that were first released on the band's albums, EPs, or singles are not included.

Year	Release details	Track(s)
1981	Chunks: Released: 1981; Label: New Alliance (NAR-003) / SST (SST-069); Format: CD	"Global Probing"
2000	The Blasting Room: Released: 2000; Label: Owned & Operated (O&O-008); Format: CD	"Like the Way I Know"^{[I]}
2004	Rock Against Bush, Vol. 1: Released: April 20, 2004; Label: Fat Wreck Chords (FAT-675); Format: CD	"Sad State of Affairs"

I "Like the Way I Know" was recorded in June 1982 during the Milo Goes to College sessions but was not released until 2000.
