= Filmage =

- The theatrical release poster uses the Descendents' Milo character as drawn by Chris Shary.
- Directed by: Matt Riggle; Deedle LaCour
- Written by: Matt Riggle
- Produced by: Matt Riggle; Deedle LaCour; James Rayburn; Justin Wilson
- Starring: Bill Stevenson; Milo Aukerman; Karl Alvarez; Stephen Egerton
- Music by: Descendents; All
- Production company: Rogue Elephant Pictures
- Release date: June 15, 2013 (premiere)
- Running time: 90 minutes
- Country: United States
- Language: English

Filmage: The Story of Descendents/All is a 2013 independent documentary film chronicling the history of the American punk rock bands the Descendents and All. It was written by Matt Riggle, who produced and directed it with Deedle LaCour. The film uses an oral history format, telling the bands' stories through the use of interviews with over 40 subjects, as well as new and archival footage. It stars drummer Bill Stevenson, singer Milo Aukerman, bassist Karl Alvarez, and guitarist Stephen Egerton, and features nearly all past and present members of both bands. Filmage also features numerous musicians who were contemporaries of, worked with, or were influenced by the Descendents and All.

The documentary premiered June 15, 2013 and was shown in select screenings and at film festivals in North America, South America, Europe, and Australia throughout 2013 and 2014. It had a limited theatrical run in Los Angeles in September and October 2014 before being widely released on home video. Filmage has received mostly positive reviews from critics.

The film's title derives from the band's tradition of titling some songs and albums by adding the suffix "-age" to words that would not normally use it (cf. "Myage", "Tonyage", "Bikeage", "Cameage", Liveage!, and "Daveage").

== Synopsis ==
The film begins with the Descendents' origins in the neighboring communities of Hermosa Beach and Manhattan Beach, California in the late 1970s. Middle school friends Frank Navetta and Dave Nolte start the band in 1977 by writing songs together on guitar. Classmate Bill Stevenson impresses them with his musical talents and becomes their drummer. In 1979 they meet bassist Tony Lombardo in Long Beach and recruit him to the band. Nolte bows out to join his brothers in The Last, and Navetta, Stevenson, and Lombardo record the Descendents' debut single. Stevenson's high school classmate Milo Aukerman joins the band as lead singer, and the new lineup builds a local following through their catchy and melodic songs, energetic live shows, and Aukerman's image as a nerd. They release the Fat EP (1981) and their debut album Milo Goes to College (1982), so named because Aukerman leaves the band to study biology. Stevenson drums in Black Flag for the next few years.

In 1985 the Descendents reconvene for a second album, I Don't Want to Grow Up. Navetta has burned all of his equipment and moved to Oregon, and is replaced by Ray Cooper. Stevenson pushes for the band to tour, but Lombardo declines and quits. He is replaced by Doug Carrion, and this lineup records 1986's Enjoy!, after which Cooper and Carrion both leave the band. Stevenson recruits bassist Karl Alvarez from Salt Lake City, who brings in his close friend Stephen Egerton to play guitar. The new lineup releases the 1987 album All, themed around the philosophical concept of "All" invented by Stevenson and friend Pat McCuistion. Aukerman leaves the band again to attend graduate school.

Stevenson, Alvarez, and Egerton start a new band, All, with singer Dave Smalley. They put out the album Allroy Sez and EP Allroy for Prez in 1988, but their constant touring schedule proves too much for Smalley, who soon quits. They replace him with Scott Reynolds and release Allroy's Revenge (1989), but have difficulty finding an audience without the recognizable Descendents name and frontman. Seeking a more affordable cost of living and centralized location from which to tour, All relocates to Brookfield, Missouri in 1990. Reynolds quits the band following 1992's Percolater album. With new singer Chad Price All releases 1993's Breaking Things. Signing to a major record label, they relocate to Fort Collins, Colorado and build their own recording studio, The Blasting Room. Their lone major label album is 1995's Pummel.

Reuniting with Aukerman as the Descendents, the band releases Everything Sucks in 1996 and enjoys renewed audience enthusiasm. After Aukerman returns to his biochemistry career, All issues Mass Nerder (1998) and Problematic (2000) but remains in the shadow of the Descendents, failing to reach the same level of popularity and record sales. As Stevenson puts it, "All is the band guilty of not being the Descendents."

The final third of the film focuses on Stevenson's family and health issues. He takes care of his ailing father during the final year of the latter's life, and their difficult relationship inspires the Descendents song "One More Day". The bands then experience a hiatus for several years as Alvarez divorces, Egerton moves to Tulsa, Oklahoma, and Stevenson focuses on his work as a record producer. Stevenson's health declines until he suffers a pulmonary embolism, and a large meningioma is discovered compressing his frontal lobes. With the help of Dr. Mark Neagle, he undergoes neurosurgery and recovers quickly. To help pay his medical bills, the Descendents reunite for festival appearances and other occasional shows. Now in their late forties, the band members enjoy their relaxed performance schedule, audience enthusiasm, old friendships, and ability to bring their children to their shows.

== Cast ==
Filmage features interviews with all past and present members of the Descendents and All with the exceptions of guitarists Frank Navetta, who died in 2008, and Ray Cooper, who declined to participate, though Cooper is presented through archival interview footage.

Band members

- Karl Alvarez – Descendents/All bassist (1986–present)
- Milo Aukerman – Descendents singer (1980–87, 1995–present)
- Doug Carrion – Descendents bassist (1985–86)
- Stephen Egerton – Descendents/All guitarist (1986–present)
- Tony Lombardo – Descendents bassist (1979–85)
- Dave Nolte – Descendents guitarist (1977–79)
- Chad Price – All singer (1993–present)
- Scott Reynolds – All singer (1988–93)
- Dave Smalley – All singer (1987–88)
- Bill Stevenson – Descendents/All drummer (1979–present)

Associates

- Richard Andrews – recording engineer, record producer
- Jeff "Rat" Atkins – illustrator of Milo caricature
- Roger Deuerlein – creator of Milo caricature
- Kevin Lyman – Warped Tour founder
- Mark Neagle – pulmonologist
- Chris Shary – visual artist
- Daniel "Bug" Snow – longtime All/Descendents road crew

Other musicians

- Brian Baker – Minor Threat, Bad Religion
- Doni Blair – Hagfish, Only Crime
- Zach Blair – Hagfish, Only Crime, Rise Against
- "Fat Mike" Burkett – NOFX, Fat Wreck Chords
- Greg Cameron – SWA
- Joey Cape – Lagwagon
- Chris DeMakes – Less Than Jake
- Chuck Dukowski – Black Flag
- Greg Graffin – Bad Religion
- Dave Grohl – Nirvana, Foo Fighters
- Brett Gurewitz – Bad Religion, Epitaph Records
- Robert Hecker – Redd Kross
- Mike Herrera – MxPx
- Mark Hoppus – Blink-182
- Trever Keith – Face to Face
- Jim Lindberg – Pennywise
- Roger Manganelli – Less Than Jake
- Tim McIlrath – Rise Against
- Keith Morris – Black Flag, Circle Jerks
- Dave Naz – Chemical People, Down by Law, The Last
- Joe Nolte – The Last
- Kira Roessler – Black Flag
- Kim Shattuck – The Muffs
- Scott Shiflett – Face to Face
- Mike Watt – Minutemen
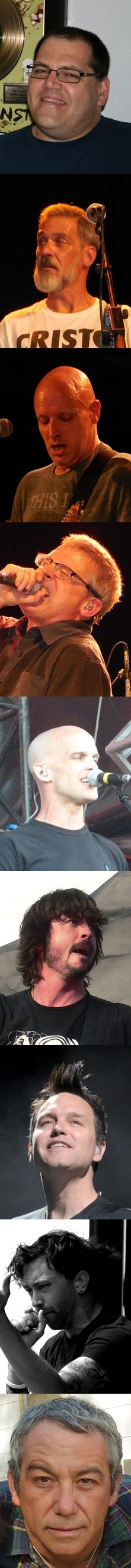
From top to bottom: Filmage stars Bill Stevenson, Karl Alvarez, Stephen Egerton, and Milo Aukerman, and features multiple interview segments with Zach Blair, Dave Grohl, Mark Hoppus, Tim McIlrath, and Mike Watt, among others.

== Production ==
Production of Filmage began in fall 2010, with the filmmakers conducting over fifty interviews. To help gather material, they solicited photographs and video footage from the bands' fans. Matt Riggle and Deedle LaCour directed the film; LaCour, James Rayburn, and director of photography Justin Wilson edited it, and all four served as producers. Co-producers included Caryn Capotosto, Stefany Strah, and Marissa LaCour.

Several Descendents concerts were filmed for inclusion in the documentary, including their performances at the 2010 Fun Fun Fun Fest in Austin, Texas; 2011 FYF Fest in Los Angeles; 2011 Punk Rock Bowling & Music Festival in Las Vegas; 2011 GV30 event in Santa Monica, California; 2012 Riot Fest in Chicago; and a January 2012 performance at the Fillmore Auditorium in Denver. The soundtrack of Filmage includes 46 Descendents songs and 30 All songs. It also includes songs by The Lemonheads, The Last, and Egerton's band Slorder. Additionally, Wilson, LaCour, and Matt Morris wrote nine tracks of instrumental music for the film score.

== Release ==
Filmage premiered June 15, 2013 at the North by Northeast festival in Toronto. The filmmakers subsequently organized numerous screenings throughout 2013 and 2014 across the United States as well as in Australia, Sweden, Canada, Spain, Finland, the United Kingdom, Colombia, Peru, Chile, Germany, and Austria. These included many film and music festivals such as the 2013 Melbourne International Film Festival, Way Out West, Atlantic Film Festival, Fun Fun Fun Fest, Pop Montreal, Edmonton International Film Festival, The Fest, and Leeds International Film Festival. Members of the bands, cast, and crew were present at some screenings to perform, host, or conduct question-and-answer sessions: All performed at an August 2013 screening in Fort Collins, Colorado and a screening at The Fest in Gainesville, Florida that November; Mark Hoppus appeared at screenings in San Diego in September 2013 and in London that November; Chad Price's band Drag the River performed at an October 2013 screening in Santa Barbara, California; Stephen Egerton appeared at a December 2013 screening in Tulsa, Oklahoma; Milo Aukerman and Matt Riggle appeared at February 2014 screenings in Lancaster, Pennsylvania; and the band members and filmmakers answered questions at a September 2014 screening in Chicago coinciding with the Descendents' performance at that year's Riot Fest.

The documentary received a limited theatrical run from September 26 to October 16, 2014, at the Downtown Independent theater in Los Angeles. Bi-coastal release parties were held on September 29; Matt Riggle held a question-and-answer session at a screening in Brooklyn, while in Los Angeles Mark Hoppus hosted one with the band members and filmmakers which was followed by an All concert featuring singers Chad Price and Scott Reynolds.

Filmage was released to digital distribution and video on demand services on September 30, 2014, followed by a DVD and Blu-ray Disc release on December 2. The DVD and Blu-ray Disc release includes several bonus features: The "Bonus Cut" consists of 50 minutes of footage that was cut from the main film, including more detailed discussion of the Descendents' activities between 1982 and 1985 while Aukerman was in college, Scott Reynolds' reasons for quitting, the Everything Sucks tours, Karl Alvarez's heart attack, and Frank Navetta's death. "The Lombardo Short" includes 11 minutes of additional interview footage focusing on original bassist Tony Lombardo, including his 1991 collaborative album with All, New Girl, Old Story. "The Stevenson Monologues" consists of 10 minutes of topic-specific interviews with drummer Bill Stevenson, while "Filmage Liveage" is a four-song Descendents live performance filmed January 28, 2012 at the Fillmore Auditorium in Denver. The film's trailer is also included as a bonus feature.

== Critical response ==
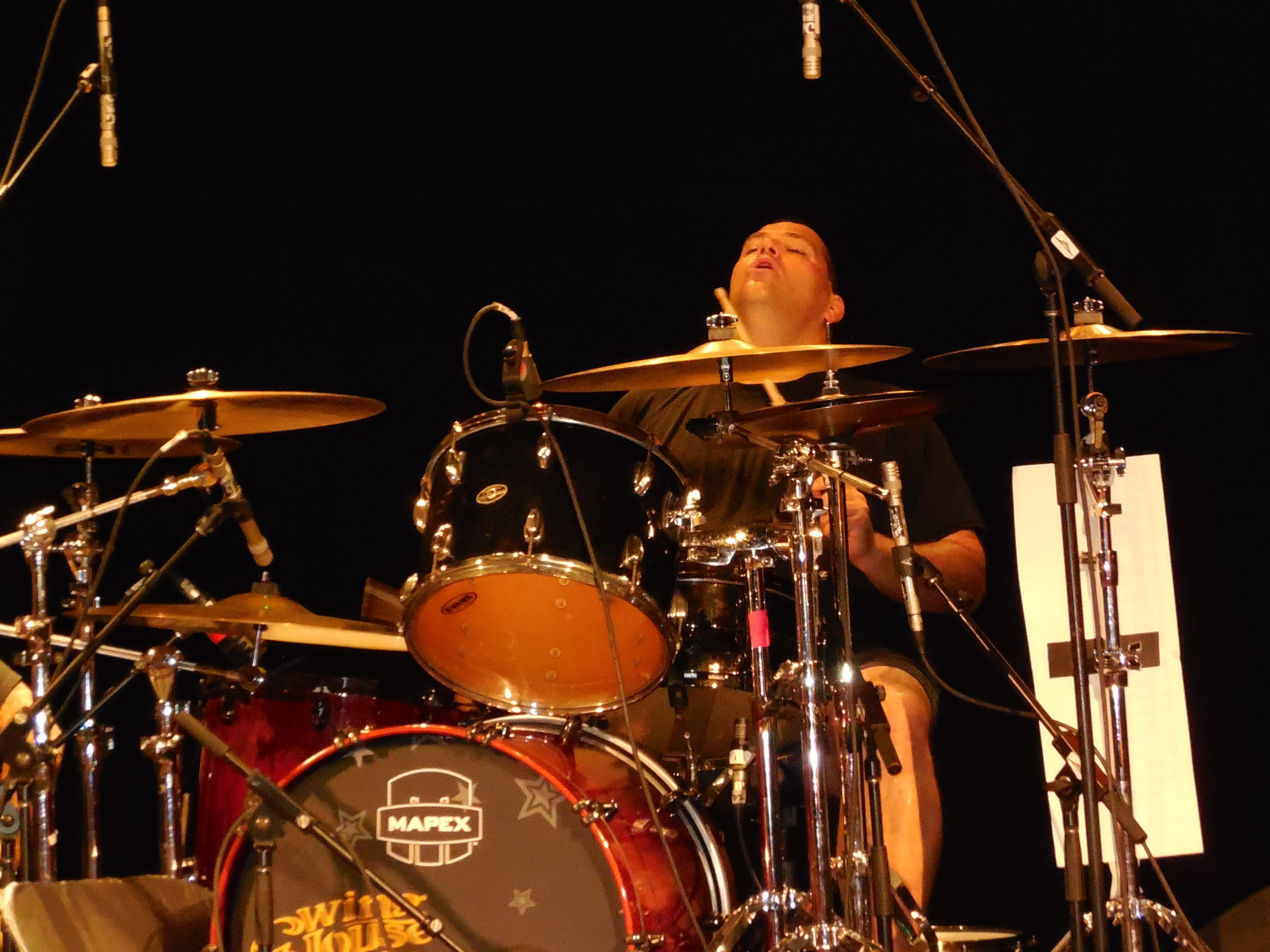
Several critics found drummer Bill Stevenson to be the central focus of Filmage, but some felt the film spent too long discussing his personal and medical issues.

Filmage has received mostly positive reviews from critics. Rotten Tomatoes gives the film a rating of 100%, based on five reviews from critics, with an average rating of 7/10. Dennis Harvey of Variety said "As younger musicians here attest, many a better-known act might well never have existed without these pioneering units' influence, and Matt Riggle and Deedle LaCour's documentary captures their enduring appeal [...] There's plenty of archival interview and concert footage here, in addition to that shot by the directing duo, edited together into a package as tight and ingratiating as the music itself — of which there is, naturally, a ton soundtracked." Robert Abele of the Los Angeles Times called it "exhilarating and curiously moving" and said that "[it] is, at its throbbing heart, the band saga as creatively prolific identity crisis [...] Though the breathless tale and full-throttle tunes give Filmage plenty of rollicking energy, it's the through-line of genuine soulfulness and tireless artistic commitment that sets it apart."

Chris Packham of LA Weekly remarked "Bill Stevenson was the founding member and the nucleus of every incarnation, the band's charismatic constant, and the film is ultimately his story. He's as energetic and emotional in the interview segments as he is in archival performance footage. The directors link the decades and the lineups with channel-switching montages and band flyers with constantly changing rosters." Corey Hague of ABC Melbourne said that Filmage "has a ready built narrative that jumps around accordingly. It has to be said that it's not always easy to keep up with who's who, but thankfully it doesn't really matter — this is a well made documentary about the power of music and the people who make it."

Stephen Dalton of The Hollywood Reporter was more critical of the documentary, calling it "lightweight but warm-hearted" and a "genial love letter to a minor musical cult", but saying that it "starts to lose momentum in its midsection as the turnover of interchangeable band members takes on a slightly Groundhog Day feel. In a break from rockumentary tradition, LaCoeur and Riggle fail to unearth any backstage dirt or drama here." He complained that the portions on Stevenson's relationship with his father and health issues "are serious episodes, but largely unrelated to the story. Coming so late in an otherwise light-hearted film, this tonal shift feels like a clumsy bid to add grit and gravitas." Finally, he felt that Filmage failed to place the Descendents and All in a wider context, saying "it feels limited in its lack of social or historical context beyond the band's personal story, with almost zero examination of underground hardcore rock as a reaction against mainstream pop culture in Reagan-era America. Even if Descendents had little personal interest in the politics of punk, they were part of a wider movement that deserves a more searching film than this." Postmedia News reviewer Jay Stone felt similarly about the segments focusing on Stevenson, remarking that while he "emerges as the key character in Filmage" and forms the film's human interest story, "his personal history, including problems with a distant father and some health issues, is slipped so casually into Filmage that it takes a while to realize what we're seeing. Stevenson's medical miracle is worth a movie of its own, but in the world of punk music documentaries, it's just a sidebar."
