= Sessions (Descendents EP) =

EP by the Descendents
- Released: 1997
- Recorded: June–July 1996
- Genre: Punk rock
- Length: 4:12
- Label: Sessions
- Producers: Bill Stevenson, Stephen Egerton

Descendents chronology
Everything Sucks (1996)	Sessions (1997)	Live Plus One (2001)

Sessions is an EP by the American punk rock band the Descendents, released in 1997 through Sessions Records and consisting of two tracks from the recording of their 1996 album Everything Sucks. "Gotta" was written by and features the band's original bassist Tony Lombardo; it was left off of the album and used as a B-side for the "When I Get Old" single. "Grand Theme" is an instrumental track that was included on the album as a hidden track following "Thank You".

== Track listing ==
Side A
No.	Title	Writer(s)	Length
1.	"Gotta"	Tony Lombardo	2:15

Side B
No.	Title	Writer(s)	Length
1.	"Grand Theme"	Karl Alvarez	1:57
Total length:			4:12

== Personnel ==
Band

- Milo Aukerman – vocals
- Stephen Egerton – guitar, producer, engineer
- Karl Alvarez – bass guitar
- Bill Stevenson – drums, producer, engineer

Additional musicians

- Tony Lombardo – bass guitar on "Gotta"
- Chad Price – backing vocals

Production

- Jason Livermore – additional engineering
- Andy Wallace – mix engineer
- Steve Sisco – assistant mix engineer
- Howie Weinberg – mastering
