= 9th & Walnut =

Studio album by the Descendents
- Released: July 23, 2021
- Recorded: 2002, 2020
- Studio: The Blasting Room, Fort Collins, Colorado; The Holler Box, Newark, Delaware
- Genre: Punk rock; melodic hardcore
- Length: 25:14
- Label: Epitaph
- Producer: Bill Stevenson

Descendents chronology
Hypercaffium Spazzinate (2016)	9th & Walnut (2021)

Singles from 9th & Walnut
- 1. "Baby Doncha Know" Released: May 4, 2021; 2. "Nightage" Released: June 2, 2021; 3. "Like the Way I Know" Released: June 28, 2021

9th & Walnut is the eighth studio album by the American punk rock band the Descendents, released on July 23, 2021, through Epitaph Records. The album is made up of songs written by the band between 1977 and 1980, along with a cover of The Dave Clark Five's "Glad All Over". Only three of the originals had been previously released, with the album featuring re-recordings of "Ride the Wild" and "It's a Hectic World" from the band's first 7", as well as "Like the Way I Know", an outtake from the Milo Goes to College sessions that was eventually released on the 1999 compilation The Blasting Room.

== Recording info ==
The initial sessions took place in 2002 at The Blasting Room in Fort Collins, Colorado, and featured drummer Bill Stevenson with former members guitarist Frank Navetta and bassist Tony Lombardo. The sessions laid dormant until the COVID-19 lockdowns in 2020, when singer Milo Aukerman recorded vocals at his home in Delaware. This marked the first time the "classic" lineup had been featured on a recording since Everything Sucks (1996), and the first album since Enjoy! (1986) not to feature current members Stephen Egerton and Karl Alvarez.

Professional ratings
Aggregate scores
Source	Rating
AnyDecentMusic?	6.8/10
Metacritic	70/100
Review scores
Source	Rating
AllMusic	3/5 stars
Exclaim!	8
The Hard Times	9.8/10
Kerrang!	3/5
Pitchfork	7.1/10
Spectrum Culture	3/5 stars
Under the Radar	8/10 stars
XS Noize	7/10
The Young Folks	6

== Track listing ==
9th & Walnut track listing
No.	Title	Writer(s)	Length
1.	"Sailor's Choice"	Frank Navetta	1:14
2.	"Crepe Suzette"	Navetta	1:05
3.	"You Make Me Sick"	Tony Lombardo	0:56
4.	"Lullaby"	Navetta	1:01
5.	"Nightage"	Lombardo	2:22
6.	"Baby Doncha Know"	Navetta	0:56
7.	"Tired of Being Tired"	Lombardo	1:16
8.	"I'm Shaky"	Navetta	1:48
9.	"Grudge"	Navetta	1:28
10.	"Mohicans"	Navetta	1:41
11.	"Like the Way I Know"	Dave Nolte	0:57
12.	"It's a Hectic World"	Lombardo	1:37
13.	"To Remember"	Navetta	1:45
14.	"Yore Disgusting"	Navetta	0:52
15.	"It's My Hair"	Nolte	1:14
16.	"I Need Some"	Navetta	1:10
17.	"Ride the Wild"	Navetta	2:14
18.	"Glad All Over"	Dave Clark; Mike Smith	1:38
Total length:			25:14

== Personnel ==
Descendents

- Milo Aukerman – vocals, engineering
- Frank Navetta – guitar, vocals on the bridge of "Grudge"
- Tony Lombardo – bass guitar
- Bill Stevenson – drums, production, mixing, engineering

Additional contributors

- Jason Livermore – mastering, engineering
- Chris Shary – cover art
- Jason Link – graphic design

== Charts ==
Chart performance for 9th & Walnut
Chart (2021)	Peak position
Australian Albums (ARIA)	49
German Albums (Offizielle Top 100)	12
Scottish Albums (OCC)	81
Swiss Albums (Schweizer Hitparade)	84
UK Independent Albums (OCC)	38
US Billboard 200	173
