= Ride the Wild / It's a Hectic World =

1979 single by the Descendents

"Ride the Wild" / "It's a Hectic World"

Single by the Descendents
- A-side: "Ride the Wild"
- B-side: "It's a Hectic World"
- Released: 1979
- Recorded: 1979 at Media Art, Los Angeles
- Genre: Power pop; surf punk; new wave
- Length: 4:22
- Label: Orca (001)
- Songwriters: Frank Navetta, Tony Lombardo
- Producer: David Nolte

Descendents singles chronology
| ""Ride the Wild" / "It's a Hectic World"" (1979) | "I'm the One" (1997) |

"Ride the Wild" / "It's a Hectic World" is the 1979 debut single by the American punk rock band the Descendents. It was the band's first release and displayed a new wave and surf sound. It was recorded at a time when the band lacked a lead singer, so vocals on the recording were provided by guitarist Frank Navetta and bassist Tony Lombardo. With the addition of singer Milo Aukerman in 1980, the band moved towards a hardcore punk sound. "Ride the Wild" and "It's a Hectic World" were re-released in later years on compilation albums.

== Background ==
"Ride the Wild"
The single blended elements of power pop, new wave, and surf music.

In 1977, middle school friends Frank Navetta and David Nolte began writing songs on acoustic guitars with the intention of forming a band. They initially called themselves The Itch, until Navetta came up with the name Descendents. In mid-1977, they met classmate Bill Stevenson, who impressed them with his musical talent and became their drummer. In 1979, they met bassist Tony Lombardo in Long Beach, California and recruited him to the band. By that Spring, however, Nolte bowed out to join his brothers in The Last. The singerless "power trio" lineup of Navetta, Lombardo, and Stevenson recorded the band's debut single at Media Art studios and released it on their own label, Orca Productions, named after Stevenson's fishing boat. Navetta sang "Ride the Wild" while Lombardo sang "It's a Hectic World". Nolte produced and mixed the session, and his brother Joe turned the lead guitar level up, resulting in the guitar being very loud in the mix.

The band's music at the time was described by Stevenson as a "coffee'd-out blend of rock-surf-pop-punk music [...] The sound consisted basically of Lombardo's hard-driving, melodic bass lines, Navetta's tight guitar riffing, and my 'caffeinated' surf beats." Steven Blush, author of American Hardcore: A Tribal History, described the single as "a blend of Devo-style new wave and Dick Dale-like surf." Ned Raggett of Allmusic described it as surf-inspired power pop with a new wave edge: "Not quite Devo if they grew up on the coast, but there's something to that comparison." Stevenson sold copies of the single to fellow students at Mira Costa High School, attracting the attention of classmate Milo Aukerman: "One day Bill came to school with a stack of singles that he was selling," recalled Aukerman, "and I say 'What’s your band all about?' He said 'Oh, we're punk or whatever', so I bought one and I loved it. I came up to him and said 'I love this single. Can I watch you guys play?' He said 'Yeah, you can come watch us practice.'" Aukerman soon joined the band as their lead singer, and their music moved in a hardcore punk direction with shorter, faster, and more aggressive songs.

Both "Ride the Wild" and "It's a Hectic World" were reissued on the compilation Bonus Fat in 1985, and on Two Things at Once in 1988 which combined Bonus Fat with the band's 1982 debut album Milo Goes to College. Both songs were re-recorded with Aukerman on vocals for the band's eighth album, 9th & Walnut.

== Cover versions ==
Cover versions of the single's two songs were later recorded by other artists for Descendents tribute albums. For Homage: Lots of Bands Doing Descendents' Songs (1995), Tru Zero covered "Ride the Wild" while Pavement covered "It's a Hectic World". Teen later covered "Ride the Wild" for Milo Turns 50: Songs of the Descendents (2013).

== Track listing ==
Side A
| No. | Title | Writer(s) | Length |
|---|---|---|---|
| 1. | "Ride the Wild" | Frank Navetta | 2:30 |

Side B
| No. | Title | Writer(s) | Length |
|---|---|---|---|
| 1. | "It's a Hectic World" | Tony Lombardo | 1:52 |
| Total length: | | | 4:22 |

== Personnel ==
Band

- Frank Navetta – guitar, vocals on "Ride the Wild"
- Tony Lombardo – bass guitar, vocals on "It's a Hectic World"
- Bill Stevenson – drums

Production

- David Nolte – producer, mix engineer
