= I'm the One (Descendents song) =

- The single's cover is the full illustration created for Everything Sucks, which was used for the album's lyric sheet (the upper right quadrant was used as the album's cover).

Single by the Descendents

from the album Everything Sucks
- Released: 1997
- Recorded: June–July 1996 at The Blasting Room, Fort Collins, Colorado
- Genre: Punk rock
- Length: 2:15
- Label: Epitaph (E-86490)
- Songwriter: Karl Alvarez
- Producers: Bill Stevenson, Stephen Egerton

Descendents singles chronology
"Ride the Wild / It's a Hectic World" (1979)	"I'm the One" (1997)	"When I Get Old" (1997)

"I'm the One" is a song by the American punk rock band the Descendents, released as the first single from their 1996 album Everything Sucks. The single also includes "Everything Sux" from the album and the B-side tracks "Lucky" and "Shattered Milo" from the album sessions.

The music video for "I'm the One" was directed by Dave Robinson. It depicts the band members visiting a sperm bank in order to make a sperm donation, and skateboarding down a street while wearing white costumes resembling sperm, interspersed with black-and-white footage of the band performing the song in concert. Singer Milo Aukerman later remarked that the concept was Robinson's: "He kinda took the idea of 'I'm the One' to mean 'I'm gonna be your sperm, baby.' When he told me the idea I thought, 'Oh no, shades of Woody Allen!', but when I got on that skateboard in that sperm costume, I don't know, things just started to work for me. Don't forget, we spend a lot of our time being incredibly stupid and silly."

== Track listing ==
No.	Title	Writer(s)	Length
1.	"I'm the One"	Karl Alvarez	2:15
2.	"Everything Sux"	Stephen Egerton	1:26
3.	"Lucky"	Milo Aukerman	3:08
4.	"Shattered Milo"	Aukerman	2:52
Total length:			9:41

== Personnel ==
Band

- Milo Aukerman – vocals
- Stephen Egerton – guitar, producer, engineer
- Karl Alvarez – bass guitar
- Bill Stevenson – drums, producer, engineer

Additional musicians

- Chad Price – backing vocals

Production

- Jason Livermore – additional engineering
- Andy Wallace – mix engineer
- Steve Sisco – assistant mix engineer
- Howie Weinberg – mastering
- Grey Stool (joke pseudonym for Chris Shary) – cover illustration
