= Cool to Be You =

Studio album by the Descendents
- Released: March 23, 2004
- Recorded: February and April 2002
- Studios: The Blasting Room, Fort Collins, Colorado; Planet of Sound, Wilmington, Delaware
- Genre: Hardcore punk
- Length: 36:26
- Label: Fat Wreck Chords
- Producer: Bill Stevenson

Descendents chronology
'Merican (2004)	Cool to Be You (2004)	Hypercaffium Spazzinate (2016)

Singles from Everything Sucks
- 1. "Nothing with You" Released: February 10, 2004

Cool to Be You is the sixth studio album by the American punk rock band the Descendents, released on March 23, 2004, through Fat Wreck Chords. It was their first album of new studio material since 1996's Everything Sucks, which had been released through Epitaph Records. Following Everything Sucks, singer Milo Aukerman had returned to his biochemistry career while the other members—bassist Karl Alvarez, guitarist Stephen Egerton, and drummer Bill Stevenson—had continued with their other band All, releasing two more studio albums and a live album through Epitaph between 1998 and 2001 with singer Chad Price. Cool to Be You was recorded with Aukerman in 2002, but its release was delayed until 2004. The band switched from Epitaph to Fat Wreck Chords partly due to the enthusiasm of label head Fat Mike, who cited the Descendents as one of his favorite bands. Cool to Be You became the fourth Descendents release to chart, reaching No. 143 on the Billboard 200 and No. 6 amongst independent albums.

== Background and recording ==
In 1987 Descendents singer Milo Aukerman had left the band to pursue a career in biochemistry. The remaining members—bassist Karl Alvarez, guitarist Stephen Egerton, and drummer Bill Stevenson—changed the band's name to All and released eight albums on Cruz Records and Interscope Records between 1988 and 1995 with singers Dave Smalley, Scott Reynolds, and Chad Price. Aukerman contributed occasional songwriting and backing vocals, and in 1995 decided to return to music. The members decided to operate as two bands, working with Aukerman as the Descendents and with Price as All. Both bands signed to Epitaph Records and the Descendents released Everything Sucks in 1996. Following the album's supporting tours Aukerman had returned to his science career, though he recorded backing vocals for All's 1998 album Mass Nerder. All also released Problematic in 2000 and Live Plus One in 2001, a double live album that included a Descendents disc recorded in 1996.

The recording sessions for Cool to Be You took place with Aukerman in February 2002 at The Blasting Room in Fort Collins, Colorado, with additional recording done in April at Planet of Sound in Wilmington, Delaware, and were produced by Stevenson. The band recorded the music for the songs live in the studio with minimal overdubbing, and Aukerman's vocals were recorded over the instrumental tracks. However, these recordings were not released for another two years. Stevenson explained that the gap of eight years between Descendents albums was due to the band members having children and to his father's death.

== Release ==
For the release of Cool to Be You the Descendents signed to Fat Wreck Chords. Label head and musician Fat Mike was a longtime fan of the band, and his enthusiasm for working with them was a major factor in their decision to sign to the label. Stevenson commented that "If you've got the owner of the label saying he wants to put out a record by what is probably his favorite band of all time, that's rad. That's the best possible position for a band to be in." The album was preceded by the 'Merican EP, released February 10, 2004 and featuring the tracks "Nothing with You" and "'Merican" from the album as well as three B-sides from the album's sessions: "Here with Me", "I Quit", and "Alive". "Nothing with You" was released to radio the same day. Cool to Be You followed on March 23 and was released in both CD and LP formats, with a cover illustration drawn by Chris Shary depicting the band's Milo character drawn on graph paper.

== Themes ==
The songs on Cool to Be You address topics including love and relationships, sociopolitical commentary, the death of parents, nerdiness, and flatulence. "'Merican" addresses positive and negative aspects of American history, celebrating cultural figures such as Otis Redding, Duke Ellington, and Walt Whitman while condemning slavery, Joseph McCarthy, the Ku Klux Klan, and the Vietnam War. Stevenson wrote "One More Day" about the death of his father, who he had taken in and cared for throughout the last year of his life: "He and I always had a terrible relationship. We spent a good part of my adult life being somewhat estranged from each other. He became ill and I took care of him for a little while. And then he died. That song is just about his and my relationship. Just to get that out of me and not holding it inside anymore, is a huge relief for me [...] Every single time I hear that song, it just freaks me out. I've never, ever written a song that's freaked me out that much."

== Reception ==
Professional ratings
Review scores
Source	Rating
AllMusic	4/5 stars
IGN	8/10
Kerrang!	3/5 stars
Ox-Fanzine	10/10
Pitchfork	7.1/10
Punknews.org	4.5/5 stars
Rolling Stone	3/5 stars
Spin	A−

Cool to Be You became the fourth Descendents release to chart, reaching No. 143 on the Billboard 200 and No. 6 amongst independent albums. Al Campbell of AllMusic commented, "Like the Ramones before them, the Descendents' overall sound tends to be interchangeable, in the best possible way, with previous efforts. Why mess with a good thing? For instance, among these 14 tracks, 'Nothing with You' can be compared to 'Clean Sheets,' while 'Cool to Be You' and 'Mass Nerder' are anthems à la 'I'm Not a Loser' and 'I Don't Want to Grow Up.'" Aubin Paul of Punknews.org gave the album four and a half stars out of five, complimenting the band's ability to work in more mature subject matter while still maintaining the childish and self-deprecating humor that "is almost impossible to find anything but endearing and sympathetic." He particularly praised the band's musical abilities and Stevenson's production skills, saying that "Musically, the band hasn't changed drastically since 1982's Milo Goes to College; they're still focused on somewhat unorthodox melodies, anchored by an incredibly tight rhythm section and some guitar pyrotechnics. The band is clearly tighter and more comfortable with strong melodies, but with the exception of the omission of sub-30 second goof offs like 'Coffee Mug' and 'Weinerschnitzel', there is little that will alienate old fans. The production, by way of Stevenson (who has been producing one excellent sounding record after another at his Blasting Room studio) is the best yet, with every instrument clear and not one dominating. The common description of 'pop-hardcore' is still undisputed."

== Track listing ==
No.	Title	Writer(s)	Length
1.	"Talking"	Milo Aukerman	2:27
2.	"Nothing with You"	Aukerman	2:29
3.	"She Don't Care"	Karl Alvarez	1:51
4.	"'Merican"	Alvarez	1:51
5.	"Dog and Pony Show"	Alvarez	2:28
6.	"Blast Off"	Aukerman	2:27
7.	"Dreams"	Aukerman	2:56
8.	"Cool to Be You"	Alvarez	2:24
9.	"Maddie"	Bill Stevenson	3:06
10.	"Mass Nerder"	Aukerman	2:47
11.	"One More Day"	Stevenson	3:33
12.	"Tack"	Aukerman	2:21
13.	"Anchor Grill"	Stevenson	3:03
14.	"Dry Spell"	Aukerman	2:43
Total length:			36:26

== Personnel ==
Band

- Milo Aukerman – vocals
- Stephen Egerton – guitar, recording engineer
- Karl Alvarez – bass guitar
- Bill Stevenson – drums, producer, recording and mix engineer, mastering

Additional musicians

- Chad Price – backing vocals

Production

- Andrew Berlin – recording engineer
- Fat Mike – sequencing assistant
- Jason Livermore – recording and mix engineer, mastering
- Brad Newsom – recording engineer

Artwork and design

- Rodger Deuerlein – photography
- Jeff Hagedorn – design, layout
- Chris Shary – cover illustration
- Stacie Stevenson – photography
- Rachel Woliansky – photography
