= Descendents =

American punk rock band

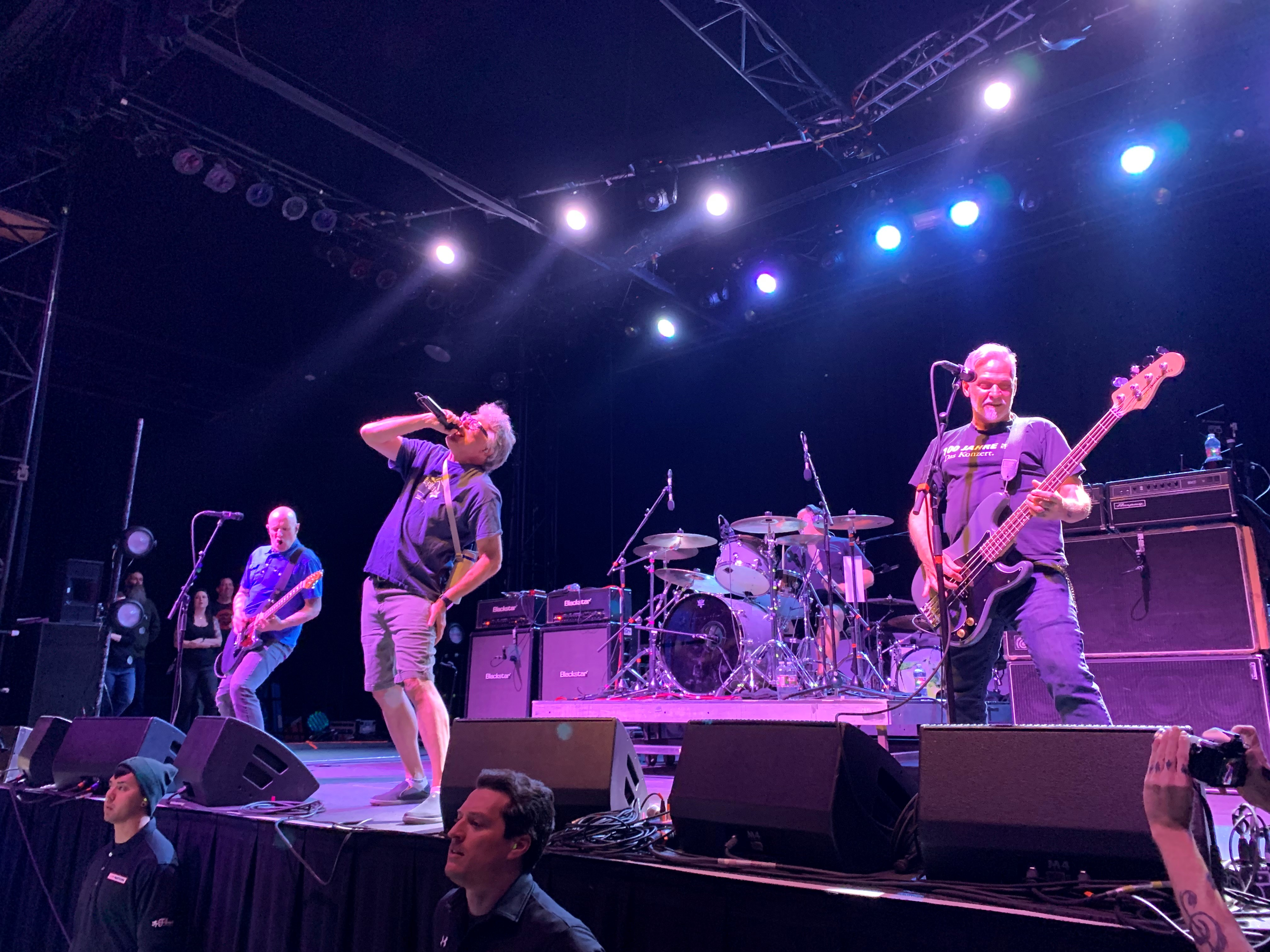
- Descendents performing at the Fillmore Auditorium in 2022. Left to right: Egerton, Aukerman, Stevenson (behind drum kit), and Alvarez.

Background information
- Origin: Manhattan Beach, California, U.S.
- Genres: Punk rock; hardcore punk; melodic hardcore; skate punk
- Works: Discography
- Years active: 1977–1983; 1985–1987; 1995–1997; 2002–2004; 2010–present
- Labels: Orca; New Alliance; SST; Epitaph; Fat Wreck Chords
- Spinoffs: All; FLAG
- Members: Bill Stevenson; Milo Aukerman; Karl Alvarez; Stephen Egerton
- Past members: Frank Navetta; David Nolte; Tony Lombardo; Cecilia Loera; Ray Cooper; Doug Carrion
- Website: descendentsonline.com

The Descendents are an American punk rock band formed in Manhattan Beach, California, in 1977, by guitarist Frank Navetta, bassist Tony Lombardo and drummer Bill Stevenson as a power pop/surf punk band. In 1979, they enlisted Stevenson's school friend Milo Aukerman as a singer, and reappeared as a melodic hardcore punk band, becoming a major player in the hardcore scene developing in Los Angeles at the time. They have released eight studio albums, three live albums, three compilation albums, and four EPs. Since 1986, the band's lineup has consisted of vocalist Milo Aukerman, drummer Bill Stevenson, guitarist Stephen Egerton, and bassist Karl Alvarez.

== History ==
=== Early years, Fat EP, Milo Goes to College, and first hiatus (1977–1984) ===
In 1977, friends Frank Navetta and David Nolte began writing songs on acoustic guitars with the intention of forming a band. They initially called themselves "The Itch", until Navetta came up with the name "Descendents". By the end of the year they had failed to attract any more band members, so Nolte left to join the Last with his brothers. In late 1978 Navetta, joined by drummer Bill Stevenson, and with Nolte switching from guitar to bass, revitalized the Descendents project. Nolte sang with the group at several of their early performances alongside Navetta, but by the spring of 1979, The Last were becoming more active and he left the Descendents again, being replaced by bassist Tony Lombardo. The lineup of Navetta, Lombardo, and Stevenson recorded the band's debut single at Media Art studios and released it on their own label, Orca Records, named after Stevenson's fishing boat. Navetta sang "Ride the Wild" while Lombardo sang "It's a Hectic World". Nolte produced and mixed the session, and his brother Joe turned the lead guitar level up, resulting in the guitar being very loud in the mix.

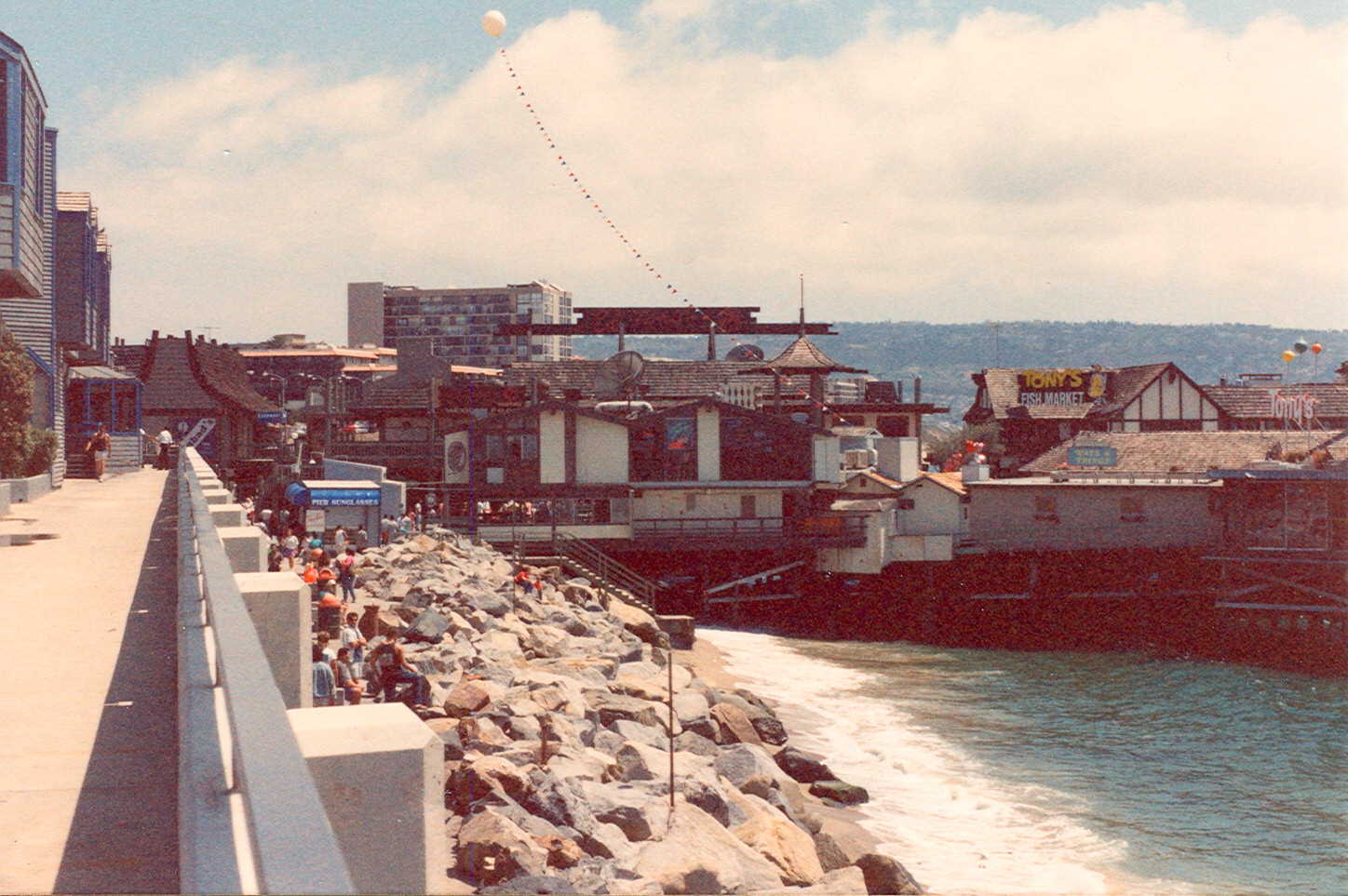
Redondo Beach, where the Fat EP and Milo Goes to College were recorded

The band's music at the time was described by Stevenson as a "coffee'd-out blend of rock-surf-pop-punk music [...] The sound consisted basically of Lombardo's hard-driving, melodic bass lines, Navetta's tight guitar riffing, and my 'caffinated' surf beats." Steven Blush, author of American Hardcore: A Tribal History, describes the single as "a blend of Devo-style new wave and Dick Dale-like surf." Ned Raggett of AllMusic describes it as surf-inspired power pop with a New Wave edge: "Not quite Devo if they grew up on the coast, but there's something to that comparison."

After a six-month trial with a female singer, Cecilia Loera, they recruited Milo Aukerman as their new vocalist after Navetta and Lombardo got tired of singing. The addition of Aukerman led the band to write shorter, faster, and more aggressive songs in a hardcore punk style. They later released the Fat EP in 1981. It was a record which established the band's presence in the southern California hardcore punk movement with its short, fast, aggressive songs.

"Kabuki Girl" from Milo Goes to College (1982)
The use of melodies and mixing them with hardcore punk found on Milo Goes to College was considered very unusual at the time by the punk scene but was considered as a massive influence by melodic hardcore and pop-punk bands.

For the recording of their debut album Milo Goes to College in June 1982, the band worked at Total Access Recording in Redondo Beach, California, with Spot, who had also engineered and produced the Fat EP. While still short and fast, the songs on Milo Goes to College were also melodic. Aukerman later reflected: "It's interesting: we started very melodic, then moved to hardcore, but melded the two at a certain point and became melodic hardcore." The album's title and cover illustration referenced Aukerman's departure from the band to study biology at the University of California, San Diego. The illustration was done by Jeff Atkinson, based on earlier caricatures by a high school classmate of Aukerman's named Roger Deuerlein, who had drawn comic strips and posters depicting Aukerman as the class nerd.

A note on the back of the LP read "In dedication to Milo Aukerman from the Descendents", and was signed by the other three members. Aukerman later recalled that the band took his departure in stride:

When I decided to go to university, the guys in the band were pretty hip on it because they knew how big of a nerd I was. Like, "What else would you expect him to do but to go off and be a geek?" I mean, I've got a Ph.D in biochemistry — how uncool is that?

The band had time off so I spent like two years with Black Flag. I got in over my head. When I joined Flag I had every intention of doing both bands but it was physically impossible. Flag had all this stuff in progress, so I put Descendents on hold.

— Bill Stevenson on the group's first hiatus.

The band continued performing for a time with Ray Cooper on vocals, who would switch to rhythm guitar, when Aukerman made return visits to Los Angeles. At the same time, Stevenson had also joined Black Flag, intending to be in both bands at once but soon finding it too difficult due to Black Flag's touring and recording schedule.

With Aukerman in college and Stevenson in Black Flag, the Descendents went on hiatus from 1983 to 1985. During this time Navetta burned all of his equipment and moved to Oregon, while Cooper and Lombardo performed as the Ascendents.

=== Reformation, I Don't Want to Grow Up, Enjoy!, All, and second hiatus (1985–1995) ===
"Silly Girl" from I Don't Want to Grow Up (1985)
"Silly Girl" features heavy distorted guitars and a lengthy/poppy sound which would be featured on majority of the rest of I Don't Wanna Grow Up. Since its debut on the album, it has been nearly played at almost every live show.

"Days Are Blood" from Enjoy! (1986)
"Days Are Blood" shows an example of the darker, experimental, and almost heavy metal style that is found on Enjoy!. The dark use of thrash metal chords would be abandoned on the next album.

"Cameage" from All (1987)
"Cameage" borrows surf rock-like melodies with the mix of polished guitar chords, this was considered a large improvement in the style of the band's sound and the lyrical maturity was also applauded by critics and fans alike.

In 1985 Stevenson left Black Flag and he, Aukerman, Cooper, and Lombardo reconvened as the Descendents for I Don't Want to Grow Up, recorded that April at Music Lab studios in Hollywood, Los Angeles, California, with producer and engineer David Tarling and published by New Alliance Records.

After three tours in support of I Don't Want to Grow Up, the band recorded Enjoy! in March and April 1986 at Radio Tokyo studios in Venice, California. Drummer Bill Stevenson acted as producer of the album, working with recording engineers Richard Andrews and Ethan James.

The lyrics of "Hürtin' Crüe" derived from a high school classmate of singer Milo Aukerman who had earned a score of 1420 on the SAT, gaining him entry into the United States Military Academy. Gloating about his accomplishment, he sang a taunt with the lyrics "I am better than you / You are a piece of poo / 1420". Aukerman incorporated these lyrics into "Hürtin' Crüe". The cover artwork for Enjoy! was drawn by guitarist Ray Cooper under the pseudonym "Scoob Droolins". Rather than printing the song titles on the reverse of the album's sleeve, the band instead replaced them with various euphemisms for feces.

The band supported Enjoy! with a tour through the Summer of 1986. Following the tour both Carrion and Cooper left the band, and were replaced by Karl Alvarez and Stephen Egerton, respectively, from the Utah band Massacre Guys. In 1987 New Alliance was sold to SST Records, who re-released Enjoy! on cassette and compact disc. The cassette and CD versions added two additional tracks: "Orgofart" and "Orgo 51". "Orgofart" consists entirely of the band members cheering each other on as they fart into recording equipment, a technique also used in "Enjoy", while "Orgo 51" is a heavy metal-influenced instrumental track.

One week later, on Stevenson's birthday of September 10, Stephen Egerton and Karl Alvarez moved from Salt Lake City to fill the vacant guitar and bass positions. All was recorded in January 1987 at Radio Tokyo studios in Venice, California, with recording engineer Richard Andrews and was produced by Stevenson. Dez Cadena sang backing vocals, while Stevenson created the album's cover graphics and Alvarez provided illustrations for the sleeve and liner notes.

The album was themed around the concept of "All", which had been invented by Stevenson and friend Pat McCuistion during a fishing trip on Stevenson's boat Orca in 1980. According to singer Milo Aukerman: "While drinking all this coffee in the midst of catching mackerel they came up with the concept of All — doing the utmost, achieving the utmost. The more they got into it the more it turned into their own religion; it's partly humor, but it's also an outlook on how to conduct your life: to not settle for some, to always go for All." Stevenson described the concept of "All" as "the total extent", and he and McCuistion had quickly written several short songs that would later be recorded by the Descendents, including "All" and "No, All!", written "in a fit of Allular frustration. The songs were only seconds long, but that was all the time we needed to make the point." McCuistion also shared writing credit on "All-O-Gistics", a musical set of commandments for achieving All, including lyrics such as "Thou shalt not commit adulthood", "Thou shalt not partake of decaf", and "Thou shalt not suppress flatulence". In a June 1987 interview with Music magazine, Stevenson elaborated on the "All" concept:

I'm really into "ALL"' and I've waited a long time to unleash the whole concept on people. And now I'm going to do it [...] It's just a way of thinking, in which there are extremes and there is this goal called 'ALL.' It's a way that I created in dealing with achievement and satisfaction and how the two relate. Basically just to avoid stagnation... going for "ALL" and never being satisfied and just wallowing in your own sameness.

Well, basically, I've been wanting to work with David for a long time; but at the same time, Milo has stuck with me for almost nine years now, so I wouldn't exactly feel right about just continuing to call us the Descendents. In a sense that would be kind of like discrediting Milo's nine years worth of effort. It's kind of like, "Let the Descendents be my and Milo's sacred thing," or whatever. Who knows, at some point later on we might decide that we want to get together and record something.

— Bill Stevenson on forming All and not replacing Milo Aukerman of the Descendents.

Aside from the concept of "All", other songs on the album such as "Coolidge", "Pep Talk", and "Clean Sheets" dealt with themes of broken relationships, while "Iceman" was loosely based on the play The Iceman Cometh by Eugene O'Neill. The album was released through SST Records, who had purchased the Descendents' previous label New Alliance Records that year and also re-released all of their previous albums. All was released in LP, cassette, and CD formats, the latter two containing the additional tracks "Jealous of the World" and "Uranus". The band supported the album with a 60-day Spring 1987 tour, followed by the 50-day Summer "FinALL" tour, so-called due to Aukerman's decision to leave the band to pursue a career in biochemistry. Recordings from these tours were used for the live albums Liveage! (1987) and Hallraker: Live! (1989). Following Aukerman's departure the band added singer Dave Smalley of Dag Nasty and rechristened themselves All, a change Stevenson claimed he had wanted to make for eight years. "Well, basically, I've been wanting to work with David for a long time; but at the same time, Milo has stuck with me for almost nine years now, so I wouldn't exactly feel right about just continuing to call us the Descendents. In a sense that would be kind of like discrediting Milo's nine years worth of effort. It's kind of like, 'Let the Descendents be my and Milo's sacred thing,' or whatever. Who knows, at some point later on we might decide that we want to get together and record something.

On December 16, 1987, during the recording of the first All album Allroy Sez, Pat McCuistion died when his fishing boat sank during a storm. Stevenson remarked that "He had 15,000 pounds of fish onboard, so I guess you could say he died in heated pursuit of All. He was always the '5th member' of the band, besides being my best friend, next to Milo."

=== Second reformation, Everything Sucks, and third hiatus (1995–2003) ===
In 1995 Aukerman expressed a desire to return to recording and performing, so the band members decided to work with him as the Descendents while continuing to work with Price as All, in order to "make room for Milo without pushing Chad out." Stevenson explained that the arrangement did not cause any resentment between the two singers: "[I]t's all totally good, it's just that when we are playing, Milo couldn't be All's singer, cause Chad is All's singer. So, we decided that we could be Descendents with Milo, and All with Chad. It's not really a reunion, we've been together the whole time." Aukerman described his decision to rejoin the band as "really just my re-entry into the song writing, I had been away for so long and I just wanted to make music which is what I love to do."

Everything Sucks was recorded in June and July 1996 at The Blasting Room, a studio built and run by Stevenson in Fort Collins, Colorado. Original Descendents members Tony Lombardo and Frank Navetta made appearances on the album: Navetta wrote the song "Doghouse" and both he and Lombardo played on it, marking the first recording by the original Descendents lineup of Aukerman, Lombardo, Navetta, and Stevenson since Milo Goes to College in 1982. Lombardo also played on "Eunuch Boy", a song he and Aukerman had written fifteen years earlier. According to Aukerman: "'Eunuch Boy' is the first song I ever wrote, really. When we formed, Tony Lombardo, the original bass player said, 'Dude- you need to write some songs,' and I had never written a song before so I just wrote down some words and brought it to him. He made the music for it." Lombardo also wrote and played on "Gotta", which was left off of the album but released as a B-side on the "When I Get Old" single. Chad Price sang backing vocals on the album, while Stevenson and Egerton produced and engineered it.

All had previously been signed to major label Interscope Records for 1995's Pummel, but were dissatisfied with the experience. Both All and the Descendents signed to Epitaph Records, who released Everything Sucks, the subsequent All albums Mass Nerder (1998) and Problematic (2000), and the All/Descendents double live album Live Plus One (2001). It was rumored that Epitaph would not sign All without getting the Descendents as well, but Stevenson explained that the arrangement was made because Epitaph head Brett Gurewitz would allow both bands to make albums at their discretion:

When we signed with Epitaph it was for both bands. It was a thing of knowing Brett forever, and so I just sat down and said, "Well, we want to make records!" At the time we were leaving Interscope. We weren't happy with Interscope at all. So we sat down and told them we wanted to make both All and Descendents records whenever we want, at our choosing. Brett and I worked out a deal like that, so it was really flexible and we could basically do whatever we wanted.

The Descendents supported Everything Sucks with a series of tours from September 1996 to August 1997 covering the United States, Canada, the United Kingdom, and Europe, touring with Swingin' Utters, the Bouncing Souls, the Suicide Machines, Shades Apart, Guttermouth, Less Than Jake, Handsome, Electric Frankenstein, Social Distortion, Pennywise, H_{2}O, and others. Music videos were filmed for "I'm the One" and "When I Get Old", and both songs were released as singles in Europe.

=== Third reformation, Cool to Be You, reunions, Filmage, and Hypercaffium Spazzinate (2004–2017) ===
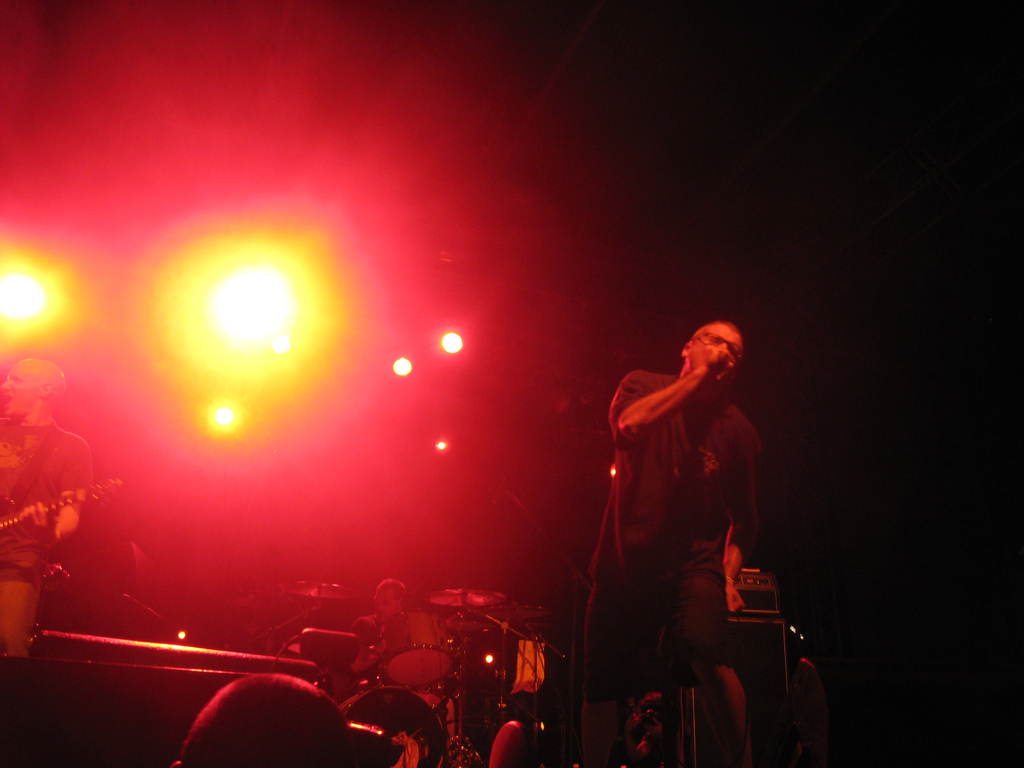
Descendents in 2010

In the early 2000s, Aukerman took a break from biochemistry and reunited with the Descendents to record a new album. The recording sessions for Cool to Be You took place with Aukerman in February 2002 at The Blasting Room in Fort Collins, Colorado, with additional recording done in April at Planet of Sound in Wilmington, Delaware, and were produced by Stevenson. The band recorded the music for the songs live in the studio with minimal overdubbing, and Aukerman's vocals were recorded over the instrumental tracks. However, these recordings were not released for another two years. Stevenson explained that the gap of eight years between Descendents albums was due to the band members having children and to his father's death.

"'Merican" from Cool to Be You (2004)
"'Merican" addresses positive and negative aspects of American history, celebrating cultural figures such as Otis Redding, Duke Ellington, and Walt Whitman while condemning slavery, Joseph McCarthy, the Ku Klux Klan, and the Vietnam War.

For the release of Cool to Be You the Descendents signed to Fat Wreck Chords. Label head and musician Fat Mike was a longtime fan of the band, and his enthusiasm for working with them was a major factor in their decision to sign to the label. Stevenson commented that "If you've got the owner of the label saying he wants to put out a record by what is probably his favorite band of all time, that's rad. That's the best possible position for a band to be in." The album was preceded by the 'Merican EP in February 2004, followed by the full-length album in March. Cool to Be You was released in both CD and LP formats, with a cover illustration drawn by Chris Shary depicting the band's Milo caricature drawn on graph paper.

In October 2008, founding member Frank Navetta died after "becoming ill over the course of a few days". The official website of the Descendents gave its grief to Frank, "We're very sorry to announce that founding member of The DESCENDENTS, and close friend Frank Navetta died on October 31, 2008 after becoming ill over the course of a few days. This is obviously a huge loss for the DESCENDENTS family. His contribution to the band, and to music in general can not be overstated. Frank will be truly missed."

In 2010 the Descendents reunited again for a series of gigs. According to Milo, the reunion is not an official reformation. He classified these as "one-off shows", usually occurring when he is able to take advantage of vacation breaks as working as a biologist to perform with the Descendents.

A documentary called Filmage documenting the story behind the Descendents and All premiered at Bloor Hot Docs cinema in Toronto on June, 15th 2013 as part of the NXNE Music and Film festival. Directed by Matt Riggle and Deedle LaCour, Filmage had a limited theatrical run in Los Angeles starting September, 26th 2014 and was released in the US and Canada on VOD, Digital and Blu-ray/DVD September, 30th 2014.

In May 2015 it was announced by Stevenson that the band had been working on some demo songs for a new album, which could possibly be released mid-2016. On April 22, 2016, it was announced that the band's next album, Hypercaffium Spazzinate, along with an accompanying EP with five bonus tracks from the recording sessions entitled Spazzhazard would be released through Epitaph in July.

On June 7, the debut single from Hypercaffium Spazzinate, "Victim of Me", was released on all streaming services. In July 2016, Milo announced he would be leaving his scientific career to pursue the Descendents full-time, citing burnout with biochemistry and getting laid off from DuPont.

=== New singles and 9th & Walnut (2018–present) ===
In a March 2019 interview with OC Register, Aukerman revealed that Descendents were working on a new album: "When we put out the last record we thought, 'OK, I bet we could put out another record after this one and not wait a decade to do it.' It was such a rewarding experience and you know what? Our fans deserve better. They deserve more than a record every decade or so. We started writing almost immediately after that record was done. I have been writing and Stephen (Egerton) has really picked up the mantle, too. Between us I think we have like 20 songs written and Bill (Stevenson) and Karl (Alvarez) have been writing songs as well. We've done some basic tracking, but it's still a work in progress but I hope we'll have something out by the end of the year."

In 2020, they released a single to streaming services, entitled "Suffrage" and including two songs, "On You" and "Hindsight 2020".

On May 4, 2021, the band put out a single called "Baby Doncha Know" and announced their eighth album that would be released on July 23 titled 9th & Walnut, named after the intersection in Long Beach, California, where their first rehearsal space was located. The album was recorded primarily during a 2002 session featuring the original lineup of Stevenson, Frank Navetta, and Tony Lombardo, with Milo Aukerman recording his lead vocals for the album at home in Delaware during the COVID-19 pandemic. It contains eighteen songs written by the band between 1977 and 1981, including re-recorded versions of "Ride the Wild" and "It's a Hectic World". The album serves as the band's first recording since Everything Sucks to feature this "classic" lineup.

== Artistry ==
=== Musical style and instrumentation ===
"Myage" from Milo Goes to College (1982)
Bassist Tony Lombardo's use of eighth note chord progressions, played in runs, provides a foundation for the melody of the songs on the album. He and guitarist Frank Navetta played all down strokes rather than alternate picking, to give the songs a more aggressive sound.

Over the years, the Descendents style of music has changed from short under a minute hardcore style songs to average length 2–3 minute punk rock songs. Critics have cited that their earlier music style which reflected hardcore punk being influential to modern day skate punk and pop-punk. Steven Blush, author of American Hardcore: A Tribal History, remarked that their "cheeky love songs disguised as hardcore blasts became the most aped formula in rock." Ned Raggett of AllMusic in his review of Milo Goes to College called it "an unpretentious, catchy winner. The playing of the core band is even better than before, never mistaking increased skill with needing to show off; the Lombardo/Stevenson rhythm section is in perfect sync, while Navetta provides the corrosive power. Add in Aukerman's in-your-face hilarity and fuck-off stance, and it's punk rock that wears both its adolescence and brains on its sleeve."

Bill Stevenson attributed the change of their sound to the band's invention of the "Bonus Cup": "We took 1/3 of a cup of instant coffee grounds, added some hot water, threw in about 5 spoonfuls of sugar, and proceeded to play 10 second songs. The Bonus Cup became a part of everyday Descendents life." Aukerman later recalled: "We started drinking too much coffee; 'cause of that and the addition of me, the music became very quick and all about bursts of energy. It's interesting: we started very melodic, then moved to hardcore, but melded the two at a certain point and became melodic hardcore."

During the band's first reformation, the songs got longer, darker, and more experimental. Enjoy! was marked by the use of toilet humor, with references to defecation and flatulence in its artwork, the title track, and "Orgofart". It also displayed a darker, more heavy metal-influenced sound in songs like "Hürtin' Crüe", "Days Are Blood", and "Orgo 51", with other songs recalling the pop-influenced punk of the band's previous efforts.

=== Lyrical themes ===
The songs on Everything Sucks and Cool to Be You address topics including love and relationships, sociopolitical commentary, the death of parents, nerdiness, and flatulence. "'Merican" addresses positive and negative aspects of American history, celebrating cultural figures such as Otis Redding, Duke Ellington, and Walt Whitman while condemning slavery, Joseph McCarthy, the Ku Klux Klan, and the Vietnam War. Stevenson wrote "One More Day" about the death of his father, who he had taken in and cared for throughout the last year of his life: "He and I always had a terrible relationship. We spent a good part of my adult life being somewhat estranged from each other. He became ill and I took care of him for a little while. And then he died. That song is just about his and my relationship. Just to get that out of me and not holding it inside anymore, is a huge relief for me [...] Every single time I hear that song, it just freaks me out. I've never, ever written a song that's freaked me out that much."

== Milo character ==
The original version of the Milo character, as drawn by Jeff "Rat" Atkinson for the cover of Milo Goes to College

A caricature of singer Milo Aukerman has been a mascot for the Descendents since the early 1980s, appearing on the covers of six of the band's eight studio albums. The character was created by Rodger Deuerlein, a classmate of Aukerman and drummer Bill Stevenson's at Mira Costa High School who taunted Aukerman by drawing comic strips and posters depicting him as the class nerd. "He usually used me to make campaigns for people running for class office. [...] I remember him making one that said 'Don't be a nerd like Milo, vote for Billy!' or something like that." For the cover of the Descendents' first album, Milo Goes to College (1982), Stevenson asked friend Jeff "Rat" Atkinson to draw his own interpretation of Deuerlein's Milo character: "I go 'Roger does the drawing'", recalled Atkinson, "He goes 'No, you gotta do it.' I said 'Okay, what kind of Milo do you want?' So I draw him a Milo. First was the crew neck T-shirt, then I drew the polo shirt Milo, then I drew the Milo with a tie, because he goes to college. Bill goes 'Oh, that's it', and it becomes the cover of the first record." For the band's 1985 album I Don't Want to Grow Up, the character was reinterpreted as a baby. When the band's name was changed to All upon Aukerman's departure in 1987, bassist Karl Alvarez created the character Allroy to serve an equivalent function for the new band.

In addition to appearing on much of the Descendents' merchandise and promotional materials, the Milo character has been reinterpreted by other artists for all of the band's releases since 1996:

- Reading a newspaper on the cover of Everything Sucks (1996). The full illustration, used for the lyric sheet and the "I'm the One" single, depicts the character sitting atop the tank of an overflowing toilet as it floods the room around him and a mushroom cloud forms outside the window. This illustration is credited to "Grey Stool", though Aukerman notes it was created by "the kind people at Epitaph [Records]".
- As an elderly man in a wheelchair on the cover of the "When I Get Old" single (1997)
- Dressed as Uncle Sam, in two versions, on the cover of 'Merican (2004), as drawn by Jeff Hagedorn
- Drawn on graph paper on the cover of Cool to Be You (2004), as illustrated by Chris Shary. Shary also drew the character as an old man for the cover of the Descendents tribute album Milo Turns 50 (2013), published by Filter magazine, and a more detailed depiction of the character as the promotional artwork for Filmage, a 2013 documentary film about the Descendents and All.
- As an Erlenmeyer flask on the cover of Hypercaffium Spazzinate (2016).
- As a ballot box on the cover of Suffrage (2020); the full illustration also depicts a hand with a spiked wristband depositing a vote into said ballot box.

== Legacy and influence ==
The Descendents have been cited as hugely influential to a large number of modern-day punk bands such as Blink-182, MXPX, NOFX, Green Day, Pennywise, Propagandhi, Rise Against, the All-American Rejects, the Bouncing Souls, the Offspring, and the Ataris. "Everything about how I sing and play guitar came from this band [...] Blink is absolutely a product of The Descendents," said Blink-182 vocalist/guitarist Tom DeLonge in 2011, while vocalist/bassist Mark Hoppus called "Silly Girl" from I Don't Want to Grow Up (1985) "the first song that really altered my life. [...] It spoke to me in a way that nothing did." In 2014, Filmage: The Story of Descendents/All, a documentary on the band, premiered. The film features interviews with Hoppus, Dave Grohl of Nirvana and Foo Fighters, and Mike Watt of Minutemen.

Milo Goes to College has been included in several lists of noteworthy punk albums. Spin has listed it several times, ranking it No. 74 in a 1995 list of the best alternative albums and No. 20 in a 2001 list of "The 50 Most Essential Punk Records", and including it in a 2004 list of "Essential Hardcore" albums. In these lists, critic Simon Reynolds described the album as "Fifteen Cali-core paroxysms that anatomize dork-dude pangs with haiku brevity", while Andrew Beaujon called it "Super clean, super tight, super poppy hardcore about hating your parents, riding bikes, and not wanting to 'smell your muff.' In 2006 Kerrang! ranked it as the 33rd greatest punk album of all time. The German edition of the Rolling Stone's The 500 Greatest Albums of All Time ranked it at 349.

In 2016, a Descendents branded IPA entitled "Feel This Coffee" was released by the San Diego branch of Mikkeller Brewery. It is named after a track from their 2016 album Hypercaffium Spazzinate.

The staff of Consequence ranked the band at number 4 on their list of "The 100 Best Pop Punk Bands" in 2019.

== Band members ==
Current members

- Bill Stevenson – drums, occasional backing vocals (1978–1983, 1985–1987, 1995–1997, 2002–2004, 2010–present), vocals (1979–1980, 2002)
- Milo Aukerman – vocals (1980–1983, 1985–1987, 1995–1997, 2002–2004, 2010–present)
- Stephen Egerton – guitar, backing vocals (1986–1987, 1995–1997, 2002–2004, 2010–present)
- Karl Alvarez – bass, backing vocals (1986–1987, 1995–1997, 2002–2004, 2010–present)

Former members

- Frank Navetta – guitar (1977–1983, 1996, 2002), vocals (1977–1980, 2002); died 2008
- David Nolte – vocals (1977–1979), guitar (1977–1978), bass (1978–1979)
- Tony Lombardo – bass (1979–1983, 1985, 1996, 2002), vocals (1979–1980, 2002)
- Cecilia Loera - vocals (1980)
- Ray Cooper – vocals (1982–1983), guitar (1982–1983, 1985–1986)
- Doug Carrion – bass, backing vocals (1985–1986)

== Documentary ==
In 2013 Rogue Elephant Pictures, an Austin Texas-based film company, announced the pending release of Filmage: The Story Of The Descendents / ALL, a film by Deedle Lacour and Matt Riggle. The documentary film has more than 40 interviews with band members past and present and keynote commentary by associated musicians such as Keith Morris of Black Flag, Mike Watt of the Minutemen, Kira Roessler of Black Flag, members of Rise Against, and many more. The film was released on June 15, 2013.

== Discography ==
Studio albums

- Milo Goes to College (1982)
- I Don't Want to Grow Up (1985)
- Enjoy! (1986)
- All (1987)
- Everything Sucks (1996)
- Cool to Be You (2004)
- Hypercaffium Spazzinate (2016)
- 9th & Walnut (2021)

EPs

- Ride the Wild / It's a Hectic World (1980)
- Fat EP (1981)
- Sessions (1997)
- 'Merican (2004)
- Spazzhazard (2016)
