= Milo Goes to College =

Studio album by the Descendents
- Released: September 4, 1982
- Recorded: June 1982
- Studios: Total Access Recording, Redondo Beach, California
- Genres: Hardcore punk; melodic hardcore
- Length: 22:10
- Label: New Alliance
- Producer: Spot

Descendents chronology
Fat EP (1981)	Milo Goes to College (1982)	I Don't Want to Grow Up (1985)

Milo Goes to College is the debut studio album by the American punk rock band Descendents, released on September 4, 1982, through New Alliance Records. Its title refers to singer Milo Aukerman's decision to leave the band to attend college, and its cover illustration introduced a caricature of him that would go on to become the band's mascot.

The album's mix of fast and aggressive hardcore punk with melody and semi-ironic love songs led to it being considered one of the most significant albums of the early 1980s southern California hardcore movement. In the decades since its release, it has received highly positive reviews and is now considered among the most noteworthy and important punk albums by several publications. Milo Goes to College has been cited as influential and a favorite by several notable artists and musicians. It is considered by many to be a foundational record for the pop-punk genre.

== Background and writing ==
"Myage"
Bassist Tony Lombardo's use of eighth note chord progressions, played in runs, provides a foundation for the melody of the songs on the album. He and guitarist Frank Navetta played all down strokes rather than alternate picking, to give the songs a more aggressive sound.

"Hope"
The songs on Milo Goes to College blended the speed of hardcore punk with melody and elements of pop music.

The Descendents' 1981 Fat EP had established the band's presence in the southern California hardcore punk movement with its short, fast, aggressive songs. While still short and fast, the songs the band wrote for their first full-length album were also melodic, described by singer Milo Aukerman as melodic hardcore. "I think with those songs we were expanding beyond the kind of fast-fast-fast-fast thing", he later recalled. "There are some of the similar coffee-driven songs, but I know that melodically there was actually an attempt at singing and making more pop-flavored music. Obviously we all really loved that, growing up with The Beatles and stuff." Drummer Bill Stevenson reflected that "By the time we recorded Milo Goes to College the pendulum swung somewhere maybe in the middle. There's a lot of melodic and pop elements to it, but it also has that [sense of] bitter resentment."

All four band members made songwriting contributions to the album. Stevenson had written the lead track, "Myage", several years earlier using a bass guitar he had found discarded in a trash bin. His song "Bikeage" is about "a group of girls who were sort of turning into sluts", while "Jean Is Dead" deals with "a girl who was not stable, but I had really not known." Fishing was a favorite hobby of Stevenson's; "Catalina" describes a fishing trip to Santa Catalina Island, California. Guitarist Frank Navetta's song "I'm Not a Loser" expressed resentment and envy toward those he viewed as more attractive and successful, while "Parents" stemmed from his own familial discord, with lyrics such as "They don't even know I'm a boy / They treat me like a toy / But little do they know / That one day I'll explode".

Bassist Tony Lombardo, some 20 years his bandmates' senior, wrote songs expressing his desire for stability and individuality. "I'm Not a Punk" reflected his disinterest in being part of the anarchic, destructive aspect of the punk scene: "That whole thing turned me off. I just wanted to play the music and do it as best I could and I had a lot of fun doing that [...] It's like 'I'm Not a Punk'. I want to be my own person." "Suburban Home" was quite literal, expressing his desire for "a house just like mom and dad's": "I definitely wanted a home. I couldn't live in a place where all the people are cool. I don't like dysfunctionality. I have an abhorrence of dysfunctionality because my mother was an alcoholic, my parents are divorced, I just don't need that assault on my emotions and psyche."

== Recording ==
Milo Goes to College was recorded in June 1982 at Total Access Recording in Redondo Beach, California with Glen "Spot" Lockett, who had also engineered and produced the Fat EP. The title and cover illustration referenced Aukerman's departure from the band to attend college; he enrolled at El Camino College for one year, then attended the University of California, San Diego from 1983 to 1985, where he studied biology. According to Stevenson, "There was never the idea of Milo not being a scientist and Milo staying in the band. He was always real clear about being into his science first and foremost." A note on the back sleeve of the LP read "In dedication to Milo Aukerman from the Descendents", and was signed by the other three members.

== Artwork ==
When I decided to go to college, the guys in the band were pretty hip on it because they knew how big of a nerd I was. Like, "What else would you expect him to do but to go off and be a nerd?" I mean, I've got a Ph.D in biochemistry — how uncool is that?

— Milo Aukerman

The cover illustration was done by Jeff "Rat" Atkinson, based on earlier caricatures drawn by Aukerman's Mira Costa High School classmate Roger Deuerlein depicting Aukerman as the class nerd. Atkinson drew several versions of the character wearing different shirts, and Stevenson selected the version with the necktie for its collegiate look. The Milo character became a mascot for the band and was later reinterpreted by other artists for the covers of I Don't Want to Grow Up (1985), Everything Sucks (1996), "I'm the One" (1997), "When I Get Old" (1997), 'Merican (2004), Cool to Be You (2004), Hypercaffium Spazzinate (2016), and SpazzHazard (2016).

== Release ==
Milo Goes to College was released through New Alliance Records, an independent record label run by D. Boon and Mike Watt of the San Pedro-based punk band the Minutemen, who were contemporaries of the Descendents. The album sold around one thousand copies locally from its initial pressings.

There was no tour to support the album. With Aukerman away at college, the Descendents recruited Ray Cooper as both singer and second guitarist and continued performing locally for a time during 1982 and 1983. They would occasionally perform as a quintet when Aukerman would join them during his return visits to Los Angeles. The band was mostly on hiatus for the next few years while Stevenson played in Black Flag. Guitarist and founding member Frank Navetta quit the band during this time, burning all his musical equipment and moving to Oregon to become a professional fisherman. The Descendents reconvened in 1985, with Cooper on guitar, for the recording of I Don't Want to Grow Up.

In 1987, New Alliance was sold to SST Records, who re-released Milo Goes to College on LP, cassette, and compact disc. It was also reissued in 1988 as part of the compilation album Two Things at Once.

== Reception ==
Professional ratings
Review scores
Source	Rating
AllMusic	4.5/5 stars
The Encyclopedia of Popular Music	4/5 stars
The Rolling Stone Album Guide	4/5 stars
Spin Alternative Record Guide	10/10
Tom Hull – on the Web	B+
The Village Voice	A−

Milo Goes to College is cited as one of the most significant albums of the early-1980s southern California hardcore punk movement. Steven Blush, author of American Hardcore: A Tribal History, remarked that its "cheeky love songs disguised as hardcore blasts became the most aped formula in rock." In a contemporary review for The Village Voice, critic Robert Christgau wrote: "These fishermen don't kid around about what powers hardcore hyperdrive—not simply an unjust society, but also a battered psyche. When they're feeling bad, any kind of power—money, age, ass-man cool, the possession of a vagina—can set off their anarchic, patricidal, 'homo'-baiting, gynephobic rage. But their bad feelings add poignant weight to the doomed vulnerability of the last four songs, which happen to be their hookiest". Robert Hilburn of the Los Angeles Times called the album "Perfect for the little guy who was ever called a nerd and never got the girl. The chainsaw pop combined with earthy humor conveys what is often an inarticulate rage." Hilburn's review was especially affirming for Stevenson, whose father criticized and discouraged his songwriting: "Robert Hillburn was saying something different. He was saying that I can write okay, that I'm a decent songwriter. So it served to shut my dad up a little bit, so that I could pursue the band thing a little less encumbered by his stifling attitude."

Retrospectively, Ned Raggett of AllMusic called it "an unpretentious, catchy winner. The playing of the core band is even better than before, never mistaking increased skill with needing to show off; the Lombardo/Stevenson rhythm section is in perfect sync, while Navetta provides the corrosive power. Add in Aukerman's in-your-face hilarity and fuck-off stance, and it's punk rock that wears both its adolescence and brains on its sleeve." Jenny Eliscu of Rolling Stone called it "all straight-ahead punk — 15 songs in less than a half hour, each full of metally riffs and lightning-speed plucking by bassist Tony Lombardo, who was always the band's secret weapon. Much like The Who, the Descendents often used the bass for melodies and the guitar to bash out a steady rhythm."

In an interview with Bobby Makar for Alternative Press, Aukerman and Stevenson recall not knowing whether Milo Goes to College would be popular with punk-rock audiences at the time, especially being that they refused to follow the style of English punk rock bands.^{[26.5]} However, their the main driving force behind their music was to make music about anything they wanted to and hope the audience would find them interesting enough.^{[26.5]} Viewing themselves as outsiders in their own little world, Stevenson recalled not traditionally singing about activism in their songs, "Yeah. It’s like, yeah, Reagan does suck, but fuck, everybody already knows that. So now what are we going to talk about?" ^{[26.5]} In hindsight, Milo Goes To College would become one of the most influential albums for spearheading the development of pop-punk, however, when the album first came out, Aukerman explained that, "I felt like it didn’t really have an impact, although I did know that one person bought my record at that point. And so I was like, “OK, someone bought it. That’s cool.'"^{[26.5]}

== Legacy and influence ==
It was just an instant love affair. It just changed my life. I realized that you can make a punk record and have that kind of pop sensibility but also be intricate.

— Joey Cape

Milo Goes to College has been included in several lists of noteworthy punk albums. Spin has listed it several times, ranking it 74th in a 1995 list of the best alternative albums and 20th in a 2001 list of "The 50 Most Essential Punk Records", and including it in a 2004 list of "Essential Hardcore" albums. In these lists, critic Simon Reynolds described the album as "Fifteen Cali-core paroxysms that anatomize dork-dude pangs with haiku brevity", while Andrew Beaujon called it "Super clean, super tight, super poppy hardcore about hating your parents, riding bikes, and not wanting to 'smell your muff.' Obviously, Blink-182 owe this bunch of proud California losers everything." In 2006 Kerrang! ranked it as the 33rd greatest punk album of all time. LA Weekly ranked it the fourth greatest Los Angeles punk album of all time in a 2012 list, with Kai Flanders remarking "Every song speaks to [the listener's] teenage fucked-up-ness, from feeling incredibly horny to just wanting to hit someone for no reason." Rolling Stone ranked the album fourth in their list of "The 50 Greatest Pop-Punk Albums" in 2017, with critic Hank Shteamer writing that "the trademark silly-sappy blend of Milo Goes to College would become the blueprint for pop-punk as we know it."

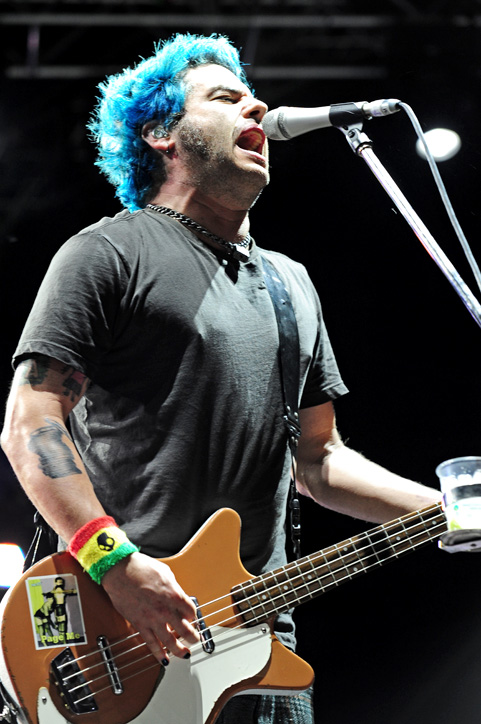
Fat Mike of NOFX, who released the Descendents' 'Merican and Cool to Be You through his Fat Wreck Chords label, cites Milo Goes to College as his all-time favorite album.

Several notable artists and musicians cite Milo Goes to College as a favorite and influence, including Mike Watt of the Minutemen, David Nolte of The Last, and Zach Blair of Hagfish, Only Crime, and Rise Against. Dave Grohl of Nirvana and the Foo Fighters opined that "If the Descendents had made Milo Goes to College in 1999, they’d be living in fucking mansions. That's a fucking amazing record." Joey Cape of Lagwagon remarked that the album "was just huge in punk and to me. I don't think there would have been a [Lagwagon] song like 'Angry Days' without that album." Fat Mike of NOFX has cited Milo Goes to College as his favorite record of all time, and said that hearing the song "Kabuki Girl" on Rodney Bingenheimer's Rodney on the ROQ program on KROQ-FM was a significant moment in his youth. Chris Shary, who has done artwork for the Descendents and their successor band, All, since 1998, remarked that "From the minute that I heard the beginning it was like 'this is the music that I have been waiting for.'" Photographer Glen E. Friedman, who photographed the band during the early 1980s, recalled that "the album had just come out, and coincidentally I had my own little heartbreak as a teenager, and I heard that song 'Hope' and I gotta say that I had never in my life related to a song about love ever before until I heard that song [...] I was just 'Wow, this is fucking heavy. This guy's hurting even more than I am, and this is desperation.' A whole new world opened up of a depth of emotion in music for me."

In the decades since its release, many artists have recorded cover versions of songs from Milo Goes to College for other releases, including:

- "Myage" by Thrillionaire^{[I]}
- "I'm Not a Loser" by the Voodoo Glow Skulls,^{[II]} Jake & the Stiffs^{[III]}, Manic Hispanic (as a parody version titled "I'm Just a Cholo"),^{[IV]} Sublime,^{[V]} and Strung Out.^{[VI]}
- "Parents" by Squatweiler with Asteroid Wilhanna^{[III]} and by Milo Greene^{[I]}
- "I'm Not a Punk" by the Melting Hopefuls^{[III]}
- "Catalina" by Black Train Jack^{[III]} and by the Bronx^{[I]}
- "Suburban Home" by Taking Back Sunday,^{[VII]} MxPx,^{[VIII]} and FIDLAR featuring Brian Rodriguez^{[I]}
- "Statue of Liberty" by FF^{[III]}
- "Kabuki Girl" by Frank Phobia and Clem^{[III]} and by Mike Watt + the Secondmissingmen^{[I]}
- "Hope" by Sublime^{[IX]}, the Skints, Ben Bridwell^{[I]}, Blink-182 ^{[XIV]} and Soul Asylum ^{[XV]}
- "Bikeage" by Face to Face,^{[X]} Plow United,^{[II]} Years from Now,^{[XI]} Joey Cape with Punk Rock Karaoke,^{[XII]} and Baroness^{[XIII]}
- "Jean Is Dead" by Shirk Circus^{[III]}

== Track listing ==
Side A
No.	Title	Writer(s)	Length
1.	"Myage"	Bill Stevenson	2:00
2.	"I Wanna be a Bear"	Tony Lombardo, Frank Navetta	0:40
3.	"I'm Not a Loser"	Navetta	1:28
4.	"Parents"	Navetta	1:37
5.	"Tonyage"	Lombardo, Stevenson	0:55
6.	"M-16"	Lombardo, Milo Aukerman	0:40
7.	"I'm Not a Punk"	Lombardo	1:01
8.	"Catalina"	Lombardo, Stevenson	1:44

Side B
No.	Title	Writer(s)	Length
1.	"Suburban Home"	Lombardo	1:40
2.	"Statue of Liberty"	Navetta	1:58
3.	"Kabuki Girl"	Lombardo	1:09
4.	"Marriage"	Navetta, Stevenson	1:37
5.	"Hope"	Aukerman	1:58
6.	"Bikeage"	Stevenson	2:12
7.	"Jean is Dead"	Stevenson	1:31
Total length:			22:10

== Personnel ==
Adapted from the album liner notes.

Band

- Milo Aukerman – vocals
- Frank Navetta – guitar
- Tony Lombardo – bass guitar
- Bill Stevenson – drums

Production

- Spot – producer, engineer
- Jeff "Rat" Atkinson – cover artwork

== Charts ==
Chart performance for Milo Goes to College
Chart (2025)	Peak position
US Top Album Sales (Billboard)	23

== Notes ==
- I On Milo Turns 50: Songs of the Descendents (2013)
- II On The Potty Training Years 1988–1992 (1993), under the title "Descendents Song"
- III On Homage: Lots of Bands Doing Descendents' Songs (1995)
- IV On Grupo Sexo (2005). Manic Hispanic also parodied Milo Goes to College's title and cover artwork for their 2003 album Mijo Goes to Jr. College.
- V On Everything Under the Sun (2006)
- VI On Prototypes and Painkillers (2009)
- VII On the Tony Hawk's American Wasteland soundtrack (2005)
- VIII On On the Cover II (2009)
- IX On 40oz. to Freedom (1992)
- X On Big Choice (1994)
- XI On Years from Now (2008)
- XII On Punk Rock Karaoke (2008)
- XIII On "A Horse Called Golgotha" (2010)
- XIV On "BBC Radio 1" (2003)
- [[#ref_On Misery (Soul Asylum song)|^]]XV On "Misery" (1995) as well as Japanese bonus track to Let Your Dim Light Shine
