= Hypercaffium Spazzinate =

Studio album by the Descendents
- Released: July 29, 2016
- Recorded: 2015
- Studios: The Blasting Room, Fort Collins, Colorado; Armstrong Recording, Tulsa, Oklahoma; Whitehouse Studio, Newark, Delaware
- Genre: Punk rock
- Length: 31:01
- Label: Epitaph
- Producers: Bill Stevenson; Stephen Egerton

Descendents chronology
Cool to Be You (2004)	Hypercaffium Spazzinate (2016)	9th & Walnut (2021)

Singles from Hypercaffium Spazzinate
- 1. "Victim of Me" Released: June 7, 2016; 2. "Without Love" Released: July 11, 2016

Hypercaffium Spazzinate is the seventh studio album by the American punk rock band the Descendents, released on July 29, 2016, through Epitaph Records. It is the band's first album since Cool to Be You in 2004.

This was their highest-charting album on the Billboard 200 chart with a peak position of number 20.

== Background ==
They released their sixth studio album Cool to Be You in 2004, and then took an extended hiatus for the band to have some time off and for singer Milo Aukerman to teach biology. In 2010, the band members reunited to play a series of live shows and work on songwriting.

In May 2015, drummer Bill Stevenson announced the band was in the process of recording demos for an upcoming album. Guitarist Stephen Egerton revealed in July that they were recording. The band recorded the tracks for the album in three different studios in Colorado, Oklahoma, and Delaware.

== Lyrical themes ==
Hypercaffium Spazzinate addresses topics of love and relationships, getting old, needing to diet, recovering from illness, and fighting for yourself. The lead track "Feel This" was written by Karl Alvarez after the death of his mother. "No Fat Burger" is about not being able to eat unhealthy foods without consequences. Milo Aukerman called it an update to "I Like Food". "Smile" and "Comeback Kid" are about Aukerman's view on past illnesses of Bill Stevenson. "Limiter" is Aukerman's view on his child needing to take drugs for his ADHD. "Beyond the Music" is about the band being friends outside of music.

== Release ==
On April 20, 2016, at a show in the Standing Room at Hermosa Beach, California, the band premiered 6 new songs; "Shameless Halo", "Victim of Me", "Feel This", "Testosterone", "Full Circle", and "On Paper", all of which would end up on the album. They also announced they would be releasing their seventh studio album, which would be entitled Hypercaffium Spazzinate through Epitaph Records on July 29, 2016. The album would be accompanied by five-track EP, Spazzhazard. "Victim of Me" was chosen to be the first single from the album, and was released on all streaming services on June 7. It was released to radio a day later. "Without Love" was released on July 11 to streaming sites. It was released to radio on July 20. Hypercaffium Spazzinate was publicly made available to stream on July 21 through NPR. Between September and November, the group performed headlining shows across the US.

== Critical reception ==
Professional ratings
Review scores
Source	Rating
AllMusic	3.5/5 stars
Exclaim!	7/10
Punknews	4.5/5 stars
Rolling Stone Australia	4/4 stars

Hypercaffium Spazzinate received positive reviews. Writing for Exclaim!, Ian Gormley lauded the band's "continued relevance". However, the album's title was the cause of much controversy in the UK due to the use of the word spaz: the music website Real Gone called for a boycott on the album and charity group Stay Up Late started a campaign to get the album's title changed for the European market.

== Track listing ==
No.	Title	Writer(s)	Length
1.	"Feel This"	Egerton (music), Alvarez (lyrics)	1:14
2.	"Victim of Me"	Egerton (music), Stevenson (lyrics)	1:36
3.	"On Paper"	Alvarez	1:45
4.	"Shameless Halo"	Egerton (music), Alvarez (lyrics)	2:05
5.	"No Fat Burger"	Aukerman	0:43
6.	"Testosterone"	Aukerman	1:22
7.	"Without Love"	Stevenson & Egerton (music), Stevenson (lyrics)	3:19
8.	"We Got Defeat"	Egerton (music), Alvarez (lyrics)	0:57
9.	"Smile"	Aukerman	3:10
10.	"Limiter"	Aukerman	2:07
11.	"Fighting Myself"	Alvarez	2:13
12.	"Spineless and Scarlet Red"	Stevenson	3:15
13.	"Human Being"	Egerton (music), Stevenson (lyrics)	0:40
14.	"Full Circle"	Aukerman	1:54
15.	"Comeback Kid"	Aukerman	2:18
16.	"Beyond the Music"	Egerton (music), Stevenson (lyrics)	2:23
Total length:			31:01

Deluxe editions bonus tracks (taken from the Spazzhazard EP)

No.	Title	Writer(s)	Length
17.	"Days of Desperation"	Stevenson	2:08
18.	"Thinkin"	Alvarez	2:27
19.	"Grindstone"	Egerton (music), Alvarez (lyrics)	1:03
20.	"Business A.U."	Aukerman	2:16
21.	"Unchanged"	Egerton and Stevenson (music), Stevenson (lyrics)	3:01

== Personnel ==
Descendents

- Milo Aukerman – vocals
- Stephen Egerton – guitar
- Karl Alvarez – bass guitar
- Bill Stevenson – drums

Additional musicians

- Longfellow – backing vocals
- Grover – backing vocals
- Maddie Stevenson – backing vocals
- Miles Stevenson – backing vocals

Production

- Milo Aukerman – additional engineering
- Stephen Egerton – recording engineer, producer
- Bill Stevenson – producer, recording and mix engineer, mastering
- Jason Livermore – recording and mix engineer, mastering

Artwork and design

- Chris Shary – front cover
- Jason Link – back cover

== Charts ==
Chart (2016)	Peak position
Australian Albums (ARIA)	19
Austrian Albums (Ö3 Austria)	53
Belgian Albums (Ultratop Flanders)	94
German Albums (Offizielle Top 100)	8
Swiss Albums (Schweizer Hitparade)	56
UK Albums (Official Charts)	137
US Billboard 200	20
US Independent Albums (Billboard)	1
US Top Alternative Albums (Billboard)	2
US Digital Albums (Billboard)	14
US Indie Store Album Sales (Billboard)	1
US Billboard Vinyl Albums	1
