= When I Get Old =

- The single's cover depicts the band's Milo character as an elderly man in a wheelchair.

Single by the Descendents

from the album Everything Sucks
- Released: June 6, 1997
- Recorded: June–July 1996 at The Blasting Room, Fort Collins, Colorado
- Genre: Punk rock
- Length: 2:27
- Label: Epitaph (E-86506)
- Songwriters: Bill Stevenson, Karl Alvarez
- Producers: Bill Stevenson, Stephen Egerton

Descendents singles chronology
"I'm the One" (1997)	"When I Get Old" (1997)

"When I Get Old" is a song by the American punk rock band the Descendents, released as the second single from their 1996 album Everything Sucks. The single also includes "Sick-O-Me" from the album and "Gotta", a B-side written by and featuring the band's original bassist Tony Lombardo.

The music video for "When I Get Old" was directed by Dave Robinson. It depicts the band performing the song in a house full of fans, interspersed with footage of the band members riding bicycles and flip book animations of the band's Milo caricature acting out themes from the song's lyrics.

== Track listing ==
No.	Title	Writer(s)	Length
1.	"When I Get Old"	Bill Stevenson, Karl Alvarez	2:27
2.	"Gotta"	Tony Lombardo	2:15
3.	"Sick-O-Me"	Stephen Egerton, Stevenson	1:45
Total length:			6:27

== Personnel ==
Band

- Milo Aukerman – vocals
- Stephen Egerton – guitar, producer, engineer, mixing of "Gotta"
- Karl Alvarez – bass guitar on "When I Get Old" and "Sick-O-Me"
- Bill Stevenson – drums, producer, engineer, mixing of "Gotta"

Additional musicians

- Chad Price – backing vocals
- Tony Lombardo – bass guitar on "Gotta"

Production

- Jason Livermore – additional engineering
- Andy Wallace – mixing of "When I Get Old" and "Sick-O-Me"
- Steve Sisco – assistant mix engineer
- Howie Weinberg – mastering
