= Tony Lombardo =

American musician

- Born: 1945 (age 80–81)
- Origin: Long Beach, California
- Genres: Punk rock
- Occupations: Bass guitarist, songwriter, singer, postal worker
- Instrument: Bass guitar
- Years active: 1979–85, 1991, 1996, 2002
- Labels: Orca, New Alliance, Cruz

Tony Lombardo (born 1945) is an American musician who was the original bassist in the punk rock band the Descendents. He joined the band in 1979 and played on their debut single, the Fat EP (1981), and the albums Milo Goes to College (1982) and I Don't Want to Grow Up (1985). After leaving the band, he performed in other acts and worked for the United States Postal Service until 2005. He collaborated with the Descendents' successor band, All, writing two songs for their album Allroy's Revenge (1989) and teaming up with them for an album of his own songs, New Girl, Old Story (1991), credited to "TonyAll". He also collaborated with the reunited Descendents on their 1996 album Everything Sucks, and the 2021 album 9th and Walnut.

== Biography ==
=== Early life ===
Lombardo is originally from the South Bay, Los Angeles, but later moved to Long Beach, California to attend California State University, Long Beach.

=== 1979–85: Descendents ===
Lombardo joined the Descendents in 1979, while the band was still in its formative stages. Frank Navetta, David Nolte, and Bill Stevenson were rehearsing in Navetta's brother's garage in Long Beach. Hearing Lombardo practicing the bass guitar in his own garage up the street, they approached him and asked him to join the band. There was a significant age difference between Lombardo and the other band members: He was 34, while they were in their mid-teens. "He appeared to be somewhat older than us," Stevenson later recalled, "but I have to say he looked and acted very young for his age. It all worked out. There's me and Frank just being completely ridiculous and asinine, and Tony was in some ways the voice of reason or elder ambassador that would yield a modicum of propriety or reasonableness to our stupid arguments."

Nolte soon bowed out to join his brothers in The Last, and the power trio lineup of Navetta, Lombardo, and Stevenson released the Descendent's debut single, "Ride the Wild" / "It's a Hectic World" (1979). Lombardo wrote and sang on the B-side track. Stevenson's classmate Milo Aukerman joined the band in 1980 as lead singer, solidifying the early Descendents lineup. The Fat EP (1981) included two Lombardo compositions, "Hey Hey" and "My Dad Sucks", the later co-written with Navetta. For the Descendents' debut album Milo Goes to College (1982), so named because Aukerman was leaving the band to study biology, Lombardo wrote "I'm Not a Punk", "Suburban Home", and "Kabuki Girl", and shares co-author credit on "I Wanna Be a Bear", "Tonyage", "Catalina", and "M-16".

With Aukerman away at college, the Descendents added Ray Cooper as both singer and second guitarist. They performed with this lineup, and occasionally as a quintet when Aukerman would make return visits to Los Angeles. Stevenson pushed for the band to tour, which Navetta and Lombardo were against: "Bill kind of sat down with me and Frank and said something to the effect of we were at a point where we needed to grow by going on the road", Lombardo later said. "Frank said no, and I had to say no also, so he said he had to leave the band and we were both kind of bummed out. I don't think Frank even believed him at first. That was a bad scenario." Navetta, Lombardo, and Cooper tried to start a new band, the Ascendants. "We played one show", said Lombardo. "Frank played in his underwear, and I don't mean boxers. It was all a disaster, it was sad, for me anyway."

Navetta ultimately quit the band and moved to Oregon, but Lombardo remained for the recording of the Descendents' 1985 album I Don't Want to Grow Up, which includes three of his compositions: the title track, "GCF", and the instrumental "Theme". He also shares co-author credit on "Descendents", "Pervert", and "Rockstar". Stevenson prepared a tour to support the album, but Lombardo declined due to his personal and professional commitments, thus quitting the band:

In 1985, when Bill came to me and said he had lined up a U.S. tour, I had just bought a house, I had been working at the post office for three years and I was engaged to a woman who I never did marry. Not doing that [tour] was the biggest mistake of my life because I think "Wow, I could have exhausted my creative potential into the band." I'd like to think we would have moved into a punk/jazz direction, like "Tonyage". I guess most people say they have no regrets in life. Yes, I still do regret that. I will always regret that. It was my insecurities. To go on the road, to leave this woman, my house, my job...I wasn't a 17-year-old kid who could say "Bye, mom, I'm off." It's goodbye to this woman I'm engaged to, goodbye to this house I put $40,000 on, goodbye to this job I've had for three years.

Stevenson later regretting not being more accommodating: "Looking back on it, I should have been more sensitive to Tony's time limitations and maybe tried to limit the touring to if he had a week or two off. That would have been the compassionate thing to do as a band of friends, but I think I was too hell-bent on charging it and going for it. The band was just too good to be 'Let's practice four days a week and do two shows a month.' We were just too good of a band for that to be the end of our story." Lombardo was replaced in the lineup by Doug Carrion.

=== 1985–present: Post-Descendents ===
After leaving the Descendents, Lombardo continued to work for the United States Postal Service until his retirement in 2005. He has lived in Lakewood, California since the early 1980s. Over the years he has played in several other bands including Nuclear Bob, Boxer Rebellion, and Launch Pad. The Descendents experienced more lineup changes and released two more albums before Aukerman left the band in 1987. Stevenson changed the band's name to All, and they continued to tour and release albums. Lombardo wrote two songs for All's 1989 album Allroy's Revenge, "Man-O-Steel" and the instrumental "Gnutheme". In 1990 he collaborated with All to record New Girl, Old Story, an album of songs he had written between 1979 and 1989. Lombardo played bass on the entire record, which was released under the band name "TonyAll", and sang on five of its twelve tracks:

Bill owed me some money, and I think he suggested that he would record an album for me in lieu of paying me some money at that particular point in time. I thought it was a great idea. They were songs of a different nature. We got Karl [Alvarez] to sing, Scott [Reynolds] sang. I sang, if you want to call it singing. My voice is very shaky, iffy. I actually sent one song to KROQ under the band name Larger Than Life. Oh, what a joke. I thought it was pretty good. It was fun. I don't regret anything. Those were pretty good songs.

When Aukerman reunited with the band as the Descendents for the 1996 album Everything Sucks, Lombardo and Navetta both participated. Lombardo played bass on "Doghouse" and received co-writer credit on "Eunuch Boy", a song he and Aukerman had written fifteen years earlier. He also wrote and played on the song "Gotta" from the album's recording sessions, which was released on the "When I Get Old" single. Lombardo also joined former Descendents guitarist Ray Cooper in the band Spiffy, who released two singles in 1996.

In 2002 Lombardo and Navetta joined Stevenson for a reunion performance by the Descendents' original power trio lineup at Stevenson's Stockage festival in Fort Collins, Colorado. According to Lombardo, they also recorded some songs for a potential future release: "We recorded some of my songs in 2006 at The Blasting Room. In 2002 we recorded a whole bunch of songs, mostly Frank's songs. He was a great songwriter. He had such a unique EQ out of his amp. When we recorded later in 2008, we did some more of my songs, but Frank wasn't there for that. We tried to recreate that unique Frank sound. I'd like to think of these as songs that if the Descendents had stayed together, this is what we would have sounded like. Those are in Bill's hands. Milo has said from the get-go that he would record it, but he hasn't yet." Navetta died in 2008. Lombardo joined All onstage for two performances in Southern California in July 2009.

Lombardo participated in the making of Filmage, a 2013 documentary film chronicling the history of the Descendents and All, in which he is featured in interview footage discussing his time with the band. In September 2014 he joined the Descendents to perform Milo Goes to College in its entirety at the Riot Fest in Chicago and Denver.

== Playing style ==
Frank and I played all down strokes. In retrospect it was stupid and silly, because you don't really need to, but it was more visceral, so you could make faces with some legitimacy rather than posing. I think my approach is that I'm a frustrated guitar player who's not really good enough to play guitar, but I want to play melodic things. It started out with just doing transitions from one chord to the next, then it got into where I was actually playing an alternative melodic line, so I would use the singer's melody as a starting point and then just kind of go with it.

— Tony Lombardo

Lombardo's bass playing with the Descendents was marked by his use of eighth note chord progressions, played in runs using down strokes rather than alternate picking. "Tony brings a unique style of bass playing," said Black Flag bassist Chuck Dukowski, "Every time they're on a chord, it's a run." Karl Alvarez, bassist for the Descendents and All since 1986, said of Lombardo's playing: "Without being a technical player, he can play some stuff that's flat-out impossible, and to him it's not weird. That's the best part. It's not 'I'm going to impress you with my virtuosity by playing this incredibly difficult line', it's just 'that's how the song goes.' The song just happens to do this ornate, complex, crazy thing on the bass because that's just how it goes."

To help increase his playing speed, Lombardo made a strap out of duct tape and fishing weights that he would wrap around his right wrist while practicing: "I used to wrap this around my wrist, and I would play—all down strokes, mind you. After you took those weights off, you felt lighter, you felt faster. It might have been psychological, might've been a little bit to it." He would frequently play so fast and with such hard strokes that his right arm would begin to cramp. "I called it 'Lombardo Arm'", said SWA's Greg Cameron, "because [his] arm would start to cramp up and you could just see the veins popping out, he was playing so hard."

"Myage"
An example of Lombardo's bass playing, from Milo Goes to College (1981)

Blink-182 bassist Mark Hoppus cites Lombardo as a major influence on his own playing style: "His bass playing on those albums of the Descendents is only entirely influential on my playing. Just that eighth note down stroke powerful foundation of the melody that allows the guitars to do all kinds of other things. His playing is phenomenal."

== Songwriting ==
Lombardo's songwriting credits with the Descendents include the songs "It's a Hectic World", "Hey Hey", "I'm Not a Punk", "Suburban Home","Kabuki Girl", "I Don't Want to Grow Up", "GCF", "Theme", and "Gotta". He shares co-writer credit on "My Dad Sucks", "I Wanna Be a Bear", "Tonyage", "Catalina", "M-16", "Descendents", "Pervert", "Rockstar", and "Eunuch Boy". He wrote "Gnutheme" and "Man-O-Steel" for All, as well as all twelve tracks on New Girl, Old Story. For Spiffy he wrote the songs "In the Mall" and "Make It". "Most of my songs are about girls, and usually how they break boys' hearts", he said in an interview for the 2013 documentary Filmage.

Some of Lombardo's early songs with the Descendents dealt with his desire for stability and individuality. "I would write a song like 'I Don't Want to Grow Up' like, 'I don't want to grow up because I don't want to be like certain adults that were negatively influencing the world'", he said, "Not just I want to be a kid and live like a kid. I don't want to grow up to be like you." "I'm Not a Punk" reflected his disinterest in being part of the punk scene: "I remember playing this one show in Redondo Beach, there was something about punkers destroying the bathroom. That whole thing turned me off. I just wanted to play the music and do it as best I could and I had a lot of fun doing that [...] It's like 'I'm Not a Punk'. I want to be my own person." "Suburban Home" was quite literal, expressing his desire for "a house just like mom and dad's":

I definitely wanted a home. I couldn't live in a place where all the people are cool. I don't like dysfunctionality. I have an abhorrence of dysfunctionality because my mother was an alcoholic, my parents are divorced, I just don't need that assault on my emotions and psyche. I think I wanted to get lost in suburbia, rather than embrace suburbia. I live in suburbia now and I'm still the black sheep on the block. I'm single, no kids, no barbecues, no picnics. My neighbors are hardcore Christians. Nobody bothers me. I couldn't stand to live on a place like Melrose, where all the cool people are coming by whenever they want, just dropping in.

== Discography ==
With the Descendents

- "Ride the Wild" / "It's a Hectic World" (1979) – bass guitar; lead vocals on "It's a Hectic World"
- Fat EP (1981) – bass guitar
- Chunks compilation (1981) – bass guitar on "Global Probing"
- Milo Goes to College (1982) – bass guitar
- I Don't Want to Grow Up (1985) – bass guitar
- Everything Sucks (1996) – bass guitar on "Doghouse"
- "When I Get Old" (1997) – bass guitar on "Gotta"
- The Blasting Room compilation (2000) – bass guitar on "Like the Way I Know" (outtake from the Milo Goes to College sessions)
- 9th & Walnut (2021) – bass guitar (recorded in 2002)

With TonyAll

- New Girl, Old Story (1991) – bass guitar; lead vocals on "U R Super", "Keep It", "Face 2 Face", "Last Refuge", and "Special to Me"

With Spiffy

- "Secret" (1996) – bass guitar
- "Didn't Know" (1996) – bass guitar
