= Everything Sucks (Descendents album) =

- The album's cover marked the return of the band's Milo character.

Studio album by Descendents
- Released: September 24, 1996
- Recorded: June–July 1996
- Studios: The Blasting Room, Fort Collins, Colorado
- Genres: Hardcore punk; melodic hardcore; pop-punk
- Length: 30:35
- Label: Epitaph
- Producers: Bill Stevenson, Stephen Egerton

Descendents chronology
Somery (1991)	Everything Sucks (1996)	Sessions (1997)

Singles from Everything Sucks
- 1. "I'm the One" Released: January 12, 1997; 2. "When I Get Old" Released: June 6, 1997

Everything Sucks is the fifth studio album by American punk rock band Descendents, released on September 24, 1996, through Epitaph Records. It was their first album of new studio material since 1987's All, after which singer Milo Aukerman had left the band to pursue a career in biochemistry. The remaining members (bassist Karl Alvarez, guitarist Stephen Egerton, and drummer Bill Stevenson) had changed the band's name to All and released eight albums between 1988 and 1995 with singers Dave Smalley, Scott Reynolds, and Chad Price. When Aukerman decided to return to music the group chose to operate as two acts simultaneously, playing with Aukerman as the Descendents and with Price as All. It is considered a return to the band's angrier hardcore punk such as the Fat EP and Milo Goes to College.

Everything Sucks was the first Descendents release to chart, reaching No. 132 on the Billboard 200 and No. 4 on Top Heatseekers, supported by the singles "I'm the One" and "When I Get Old". Aukerman returned to his biochemistry career following the album's supporting tours, reuniting with them again in 2004 for Cool to Be You, and again in 2010 for live performances.

== Background ==
The Descendents formed in 1978 in Manhattan Beach, California, with an initial recording lineup of Tony Lombardo (bass guitar), Frank Navetta (guitar), and Bill Stevenson (drums). Adding singer Milo Aukerman in 1980, the band released three albums over the next six years, weathering several lineup changes (Navetta left the band in 1983 and was replaced by Ray Cooper, and Lombardo left in 1985 and was replaced by Doug Carrion) and a hiatus from 1983 to 1985 while Aukerman attended college and Stevenson joined Black Flag. By September 1986 Aukerman and Stevenson were the only remaining members, and recruited bassist Karl Alvarez and guitarist Stephen Egerton from Salt Lake City to continue the band. This Descendents lineup recorded All in 1987, an album themed around the concept of "All" invented by Stevenson and friend Pat McCuistion in 1980. When Aukerman left the band later that year to pursue a career in biochemistry, Alvarez, Egerton, and Stevenson changed the band's name to All and continued with singers Dave Smalley, Scott Reynolds, and Chad Price. Stevenson stated at the time that he wished to preserve the Descendents as his and Aukerman's project:

Milo has stuck with me for almost nine years now, so I wouldn't exactly feel right about just continuing to call us the Descendents. In a sense that would be kind of like discrediting Milo's nine years worth of effort. It's kind of like, "Let the Descendents be my and Milo's sacred thing," or whatever. Who knows, at some point later on we might decide that we want to get together and record something.

Aukerman occasionally collaborated with All, writing "Just Like Them" for the album Allroy Saves (1990) and singing backing vocals on Breaking Things (1993), as well as filling in at occasional performances when Price would lose his voice. Lombardo also collaborated with All for the 1991 album New Girl, Old Story.

In 1995 Aukerman expressed a desire to return to recording and performing, so the band members decided to work with him as the Descendents while continuing to work with Price as All, in order to "make room for Milo without pushing Chad out." Stevenson explained that the arrangement did not cause any resentment between the two singers: "[I]t's all totally good, it's just that when we are playing, Milo couldn't be All's singer, cause Chad is All's singer. So, we decided that we could be Descendents with Milo, and All with Chad. It's not really a reunion, we've been together the whole time." Aukerman described his decision to rejoin the band as "really just my re-entry into the song writing, I had been away for so long and I just wanted to make music which is what I love to do."

Everything Sucks was recorded in June and July 1996 at The Blasting Room, a studio built and run by Stevenson in Fort Collins, Colorado. Original Descendents members Tony Lombardo and Frank Navetta made appearances on the album: Navetta wrote the song "Doghouse" and both he and Lombardo played on it, marking the first recording by the original Descendents lineup of Aukerman, Lombardo, Navetta, and Stevenson since Milo Goes to College in 1982. Navetta also played on "Eunuch Boy", a song Aukerman and Lombardo had written fifteen years earlier. According to Aukerman: "'Eunuch Boy' is the first song I ever wrote, really. When we formed, Tony Lombardo, the original bass player said, 'Dude, you need to write some songs', and I had never written a song before so I just wrote down some words and brought it to him. He made the music for it." Lombardo also wrote and played on "Gotta", which was left off of the album but released as a B-side on the "When I Get Old" single. Chad Price sang backing vocals on the album, while Stevenson and Egerton produced and engineered it.

All had previously been signed to major label Interscope Records for 1995's Pummel, but were dissatisfied with the experience. Both All and the Descendents signed to Epitaph Records, who released Everything Sucks, the subsequent All albums Mass Nerder (1998) and Problematic (2000), and the All/Descendents double live album Live Plus One (2001). It was rumored that Epitaph would not sign All without getting the Descendents as well, but Stevenson explained that the arrangement was made because Epitaph head Brett Gurewitz would allow both bands to make albums at their discretion:

When we signed with Epitaph it was for both bands. It was a thing of knowing Brett forever, and so I just sat down and said, "Well, we want to make records!" At the time we were leaving Interscope. We weren't happy with Interscope at all. So we sat down and told them we wanted to make both All and Descendents records whenever we want, at our choosing. Brett and I worked out a deal like that, so it was really flexible and we could basically do whatever we wanted.

The Descendents supported Everything Sucks with a series of tours from September 1996 to August 1997 covering the United States, Canada, the United Kingdom, and Europe, touring with Swingin' Utters, The Bouncing Souls, The Suicide Machines, Shades Apart, Guttermouth, Less Than Jake, Handsome, Electric Frankenstein, Social Distortion, Pennywise, H_{2}O, and others. Music videos were filmed for "I'm the One" and "When I Get Old", and both songs were released as singles in Europe.

== Reception ==
Professional ratings
Review scores
Source	Rating
AllMusic	3/5 stars
Christgau's Consumer Guide	(neither)
Entertainment Weekly	C
(The New) Rolling Stone Album Guide	2/5 stars
The Virgin Encyclopedia of Eighties Music	3/5 stars

Everything Sucks became the first Descendents release to chart, reaching No. 132 on the Billboard 200 and No. 4 on Top Heatseekers. Ned Raggett of AllMusic remarked: "take this out of its surrounding context and this was and is a prime Descendents album. All the humor and heart-on-sleeve showcasing one could hope for are here [...] anyone dismissing this as just like any other pop-punk around misses the point that these characters helped found it as much as anyone!" Rock critic Robert Christgau, however, merely gave the album a "neither" rating, indicating it as neither impressive nor a dud, which "may impress once or twice with consistent craft or an arresting track or two. Then it won't." In a 2004 biography of the band, Jenny Eliscu, of Rolling Stone, called their reunion "unforgivable" and stated that Everything Sucks "lived up to its name."

== Track listing ==
No.	Title	Writer(s)	Length
1.	"Everything Sux"	Stephen Egerton	1:26
2.	"I'm the One"	Karl Alvarez	2:15
3.	"Coffee Mug"	Bill Stevenson (music and lyrics), Egerton (music)	0:34
4.	"Rotting Out"	Milo Aukerman	1:56
5.	"Sick-O-Me"	Egerton, Stevenson	1:45
6.	"Caught"	Alvarez	1:47
7.	"When I Get Old"	Stevenson, Alvarez	2:27
8.	"Doghouse"	Frank Navetta	1:46
9.	"She Loves Me"	Stevenson	2:33
10.	"Hateful Notebook"	Stevenson, Alvarez	2:22
11.	"We"	Aukerman	2:33
12.	"Eunuch Boy"	Aukerman (lyrics), Tony Lombardo (music)	0:19
13.	"This Place"	Aukerman	1:16
14.	"I Won't Let Me"	Alvarez	3:06
15.	"Thank You" "Grand Theme" (hidden track)	Alvarez; Egerton	4:30
Total length:			30:35

== Personnel ==
Per the album liner notes.

=== Descendents ===
- Milo Aukerman – vocals
- Stephen Egerton – guitar, producer, engineer
- Karl Alvarez – bass guitar, drawings
- Bill Stevenson – drums, producer, engineer

=== Additional musicians ===
- Tony Lombardo – bass guitar on "Doghouse"
- Frank Navetta – guitar on "Doghouse" and "Eunuch Boy"
- Chad Price – backing vocals

=== Production ===
- Jason Livermore – additional engineering
- Andy Wallace – mix engineer
- Steve Sisco – assistant mix engineer
- Jon Herroon – assistant engineer
- Howie Weinberg – mastering
- Brett Gurewitz – sequencing assistance
- Grey Stool (joke pseudonym for Chris Shary) – cover illustration
- Jesse Fischer – back cover photo
- Craig Cameron Olsen – inside photo

== Charts ==
Chart (1996)	Peak position
US Billboard 200	132
US Heatseekers Albums (Billboard)	4
