= Milo Aukerman =

American singer and scientist

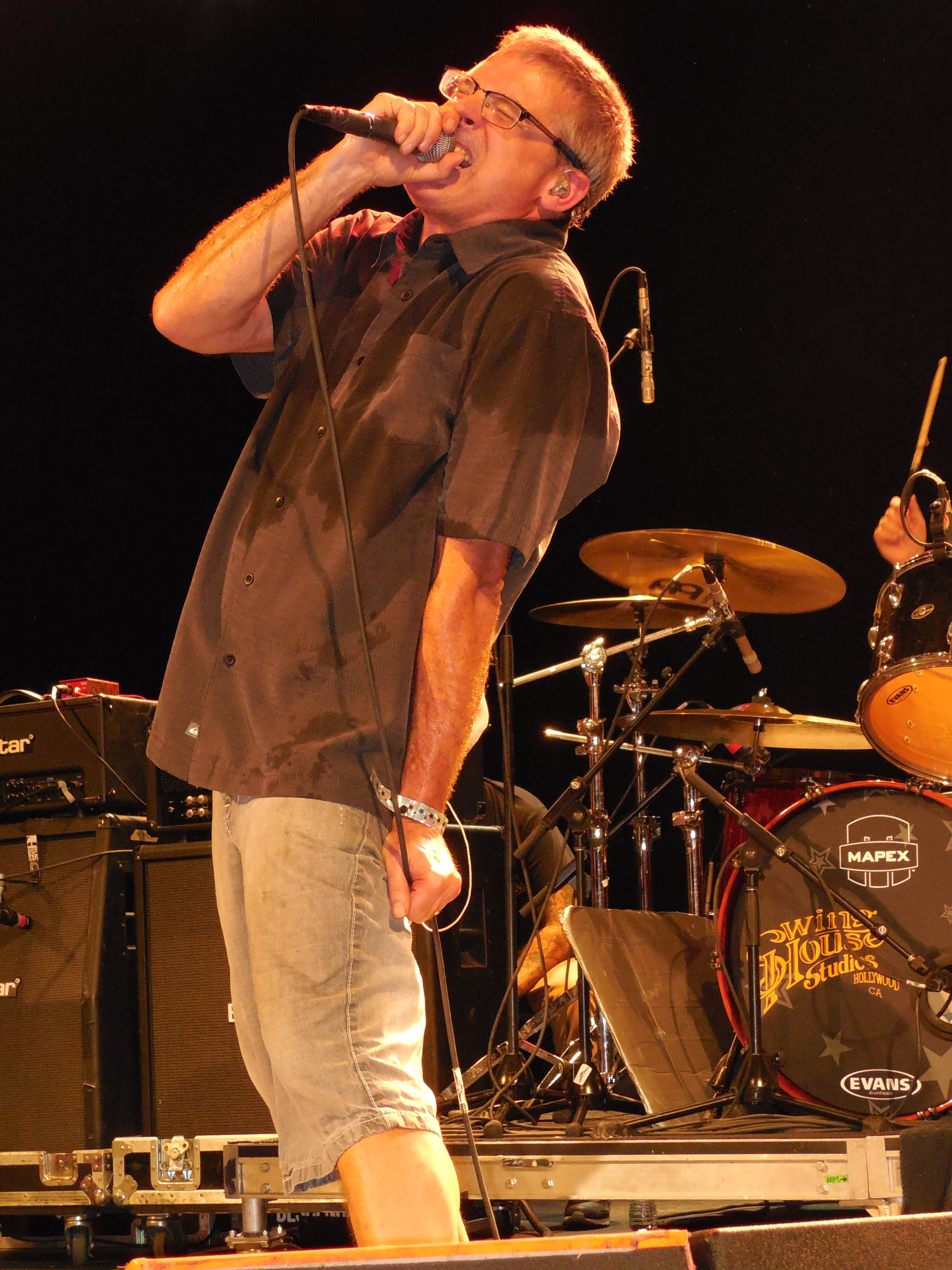
- Aukerman performing with the Descendents in 2014

Background information
- Born: Milo Jay Aukerman; January 1, 1963 (age 63); Los Angeles, California
- Origin: Lomita, California, U.S.
- Genres: Punk rock
- Occupations: Singer; biochemist
- Years active: 1979–present
- Labels: New Alliance; SST; Epitaph; Fat Wreck Chords

Milo Jay Aukerman (/ɒkɜːrmən/; born January 1, 1963) is an American singer, songwriter, and former research molecular biologist. Aukerman is most widely known for being the lead vocalist of the punk rock band the Descendents, a group widely considered to be pioneers of pop-punk. A caricature of Aukerman serves as the band's mascot.

== Education and scientific career ==
Aukerman attended Mira Costa High School, with fellow members of the Descendents. He holds a PhD degree in biology from UC San Diego, conducted postdoctoral research in molecular biology at the University of Wisconsin–Madison and the University of Pennsylvania, and formerly worked as a plant researcher at DuPont and as an adjunct professor at the University of Delaware. In a 2016 interview with Spin, Aukerman announced that he decided to quit researching in favor of doing music full-time.

== Musical career ==
While not an original member, Aukerman joined Descendents after their first single was released ("Ride the Wild" b/w "It's a Hectic World"), which featured founding members Frank Navetta and Tony Lombardo on lead vocals. Aukerman's first recording with Descendents was the Fat EP, released in 1981. The first full-length Descendents album was released in 1982 and was titled Milo Goes to College, as Aukerman had by then decided to leave the group to pursue a degree in biochemistry at the University of California, San Diego. From 1983 to 1987 Aukerman would briefly rejoin Descendents several times to record albums and go on tour. Aukerman left the band for good at the conclusion of the supporting tour for the 1987 album All, after which the remaining members continued to tour and record with a series of lead singers under the name All.

Aukerman decided to rejoin Descendents in 1995, releasing the album Everything Sucks the following year. He returned to his molecular biology career following the tour supporting the album, returning to Descendents intermittently over the next several years to tour and to record the album Cool to Be You and the EP 'Merican, both released in 2004 on Fat Wreck Chords.

In July 2016, Aukerman announced he would be leaving his scientific career to pursue the Descendents full-time, citing burnout with biochemistry and getting laid off from DuPont. The band released their seventh studio album, Hypercaffium Spazzinate, on July 29, 2016.

As a musician, Aukerman sings in a mid-range tenor, and his generally upbeat lyrics encompass such universal topics as girls/rejection, dependence upon caffeine, and the never-ending quest for good food. He is known for his bespectacled, unabashedly nerdy persona and self-deprecating, "anti-rockstar" demeanor. Apart from his work with Descendents, Aukerman has also provided backing vocals for other musicians (including Descendents offshoot All, and Black Flag on their 1985 album Loose Nut) and briefly fronted the band Milestone in 1988 in San Diego while attending university.

During the COVID-19 pandemic, in addition to tracking the lead vocals to Descendents' 9th and Walnut at his home studio, Milo also contributed vocals remotely to Punk Rock Karaoke's rendition of the Dickies' "Manny, Moe and Jack", as well as covers of Black Flag's "Jealous Again" (with bandmate Bill Stevenson playing lead guitar), Nirvana's "In Bloom", Devo's "Girl U Want" and Green Day’s "Basket Case" for the YouTube series Mikey And His Uke.

== Personal life ==
Aukerman was born on January 1, 1963, in Los Angeles, California. He has been married to Robin Andreasen since 1995 and is the father of two children.

On July 27, 2023, Aukerman suffered a "mild" heart attack and underwent surgery.
