= Stephen Egerton (guitarist) =

American guitarist and music producer

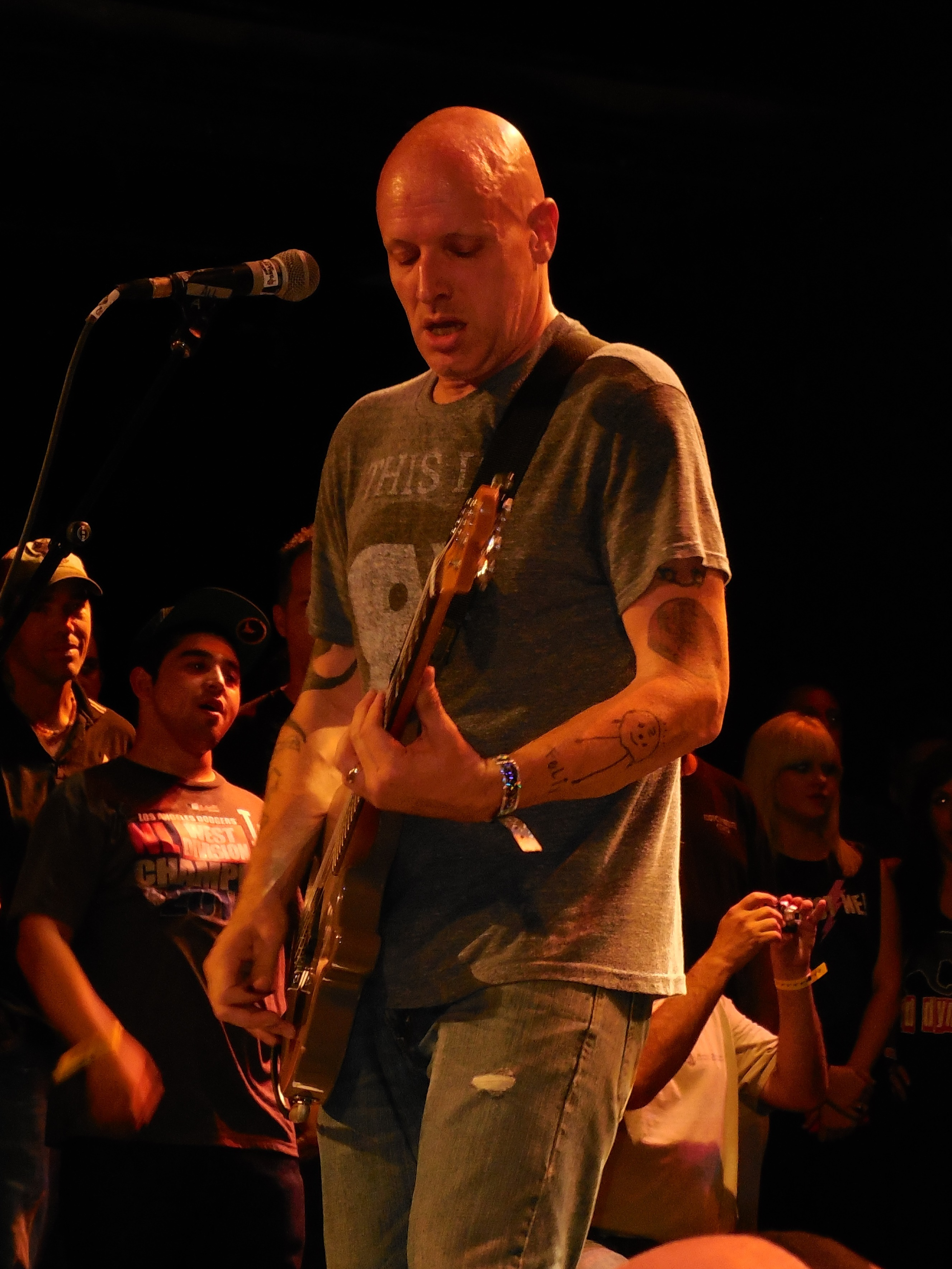
- Egerton performing with the Descendents in 2014

Background information
- Born: Stephen Patrick O'Reilly; September 2, 1964 (age 62)
- Origin: Utah, United States
- Genres: Rock; punk rock; pop punk; hardcore punk; melodic hardcore
- Occupation: Musician
- Instrument: Guitar
- Years active: 1980–present
- Labels: Thick Syrup; SST; Cruz; Interscope; Epitaph; Fat Wreck Chords
- Website: stephenegerton.com

Stephen Patrick O'Reilly (born September 2, 1964), known professionally as Stephen Egerton,(/ˈstɛfən/ STEF-ən) is an American guitarist, songwriter, producer, mixer, and engineer, who is best known for his work in Descendents and All.

== Biography ==
=== Early life ===
Egerton was raised in Utah and explained his early relationship with music in a 2009 interview: "I was a music fanatic from the beginning of my life. Including pounding my head on the floor along with my parent's records ... which explains a lot." Egerton's first significant musical influence was the Beatles, but he also grew up listening to his parents' music collection:

A lot of 50s and 60s rock and roll as a kid, and a little jazz. My mother had good taste in music, and I grew up with a great variety. When I was 11, a neighbor lent me Frank Zappa's Absolutely Free which sparked my interest in "unusual" music ... opening the door for punk rock.

=== Music career ===
Egerton played drums and guitar in the punk rock/death rock band Massacre Guys. Formed in Salt Lake City, Egerton played with the Massacre Guys from 1980 to 1985 alongside bassist Karl Alvarez, with whom he grew up. Egerton explained in 2012 that he taught Alvarez how to play the bass guitar during their time in the band.

In 1985 Egerton relocated to Virginia, where he studied classical guitar and played in the band Auto Da Fe, with former Iron Cross vocalist Sab Grey, Washington metropolitan area drummer Eric Wallgren, and former Black Market Baby bass player Paul Cleary. In late 1986, Egerton joined Alvarez in Descendents.

In 2006 Egerton began recording for a new project named "40Engine," alongside former All vocalist Scott Reynolds. The band released the songs "Sunny Disposition" and "She Has Everything" on the internet in late 2007/early 2008.

As part of a collaboration with guitarist Jason Crowley, called "Crowley/Egerton," Egerton played drums and bass for songs that were made available online in 2007.

Egerton formed an instrumental project called "Slorder," and the band released its debut EP in January 2009.

In 2010, Egerton released The Seven Degrees of Stephen Egerton on the Paper + Plastick label. The album features Egerton playing with a variety of vocalists, including Milo Aukerman, Joey Cape, and Mike Herrera. Two album release shows occurred in Oklahoma during May 2010, and Slorder also performed at both shows.

Egerton explained in a July 2012 interview that Descendents had transformed into a lesser responsibility for the band members, as singer Aukerman was unable to commit to a full-time band schedule at the time; furthermore, three of the four members were parents. Egerton stated that he was satisfied with the new arrangement, whereby the band played around 20 shows on an annual basis: "We fly in; we rock out, have fun, don’t burn it out, go home and back to normal. I love it."

During the surprise guest appearance of Black Flag at the 30th-anniversary Goldenvoice show—held at the Santa Monica Civic Auditorium in December 2011—at which Descendents was the headline act, Keith Morris and Chuck Dukowski joined Bill Stevenson and Egerton to play Black Flag's first EP, Nervous Breakdown. In January 2013, the formation of the same lineup that played Nervous Breakdown as the band FLAG was announced, with Black Flag's third singer and one-time rhythm-guitar player Dez Cadena joining the band afterward. Prior to a September 2013 FLAG performance at Irving Plaza in New York City, Dukowski said regarding the band's formation: "I knew Bill [Stevenson] and Stephen [Egerton] would rage." Although the backgrounds of the band's membership are diverse, FLAG solely perform "the songs of Black Flag."

Egerton recorded a guitar solo for Role Model, the 2013 album of Australian band Bodyjar.

=== Production career ===
In July 2012, Egerton explained that he was continuing to run the Armstrong Studios recording facility—based at his house in Tulsa, Oklahoma—where he engineers, produces and mixes music:

I'm very fortunate in that my main day job is mixing and mastering records. I do most of my work in my spare bedroom; I have a studio at home and sometimes I record bands there but mostly I do mixing and mastering so it works out convenient for me. I'm there all the time.

In September 2009, Egerton revealed that he enjoyed recording more than touring, as he liked the idea of music being "permanent," and stated that, by that stage, he had been involved in the recording of "probably 30 or so bands, and more than 50 projects over the last bunch of years." In a 2010 interview, Russ Rankin of the American punk band Good Riddance, identified Egerton—during his time at the Blasting Room studio alongside Descendents drummer Stevenson—as a producer who "really understood what Good Riddance was about":

Also, the way they [Egerton and Stevenson] recorded … it was completely out of the ordinary … we'd been through the culture where you'd lay down the drums first, then you lay down the bass, then you lay down the guitars, and then you do the vocals … and we get to the Blasting Room and once the drums were done it was like, all bets are off … it was definitely a new approach for us anyway, we'd never done anything like that before, so I think that those guys really brought out the best in us, they challenged us, but they also, I think, had a really innate sense of knowing what we were trying to get done.

Egerton and Stevenson also mixed Bodyjar's Jarchives: 10 Years of Bodyjar compilation album.

== Personal life ==
Egerton and his wife reside in Tulsa, Oklahoma, with their children, Sophie and Felix O'Reilly. Egerton explained in 2012 that he chose Tulsa so that his children could be near to his wife's parents, and in 2009 he also mentioned the "inexpensive" cost of living in the city. Egerton provided a brief insight into his daily schedule in 2012:

I’m the guy that takes [the kids] to the bus, my wife's job is set hours, I have complete flexibility in my schedule. I live a mile from school, if I need to take care of something I do. I really like it because my mother had to work and my Dad was gone, so to be there for them [the kids] feels good.

Egerton's wife is originally from Perth, Australia.
