= Waldman =

Waldman is a surname. Notable people with the surname include:

- Adelle Waldman (born 1977), American novelist
- Amy Waldman (born 1969), American author and journalist
- Anne Waldman (born 1945), American poet
- Ariel Waldman, science populariser and author
- Ayelet Waldman (born 1964), author
- Bernard Waldman (1913–1986), American physicist
- Camilla Waldman (born 1968), South African actress
- Danielle G. Waldman (born 1985), American-Israeli show jumper
- Eliezer Waldman (1937–2021), Israeli rabbi
- Eyal Waldman, Israeli businessman
- Frank Waldman (1919–1990), American screenwriter
- Frederic Waldman (1903–1995), Austrian-born American conductor
- H Waldman (born 1972), American basketball player
- Hélio Waldman, Brazilian scientist
- Irwin Waldman, American psychologist
- Jack Waldman (1952–1986), American musician
- Jay Waldman (1944–2003), American judge
- Jim Waldman (born 1958), American politician
- Jonathan Waldman, American writer
- Ken Waldman, American writer and musician
- Leibele Waldman (1907–1969), American cantor
- Louis Waldman (1892–1982), American lawyer and politician
- Louis A. Waldman (born 1965), American art historian and artist
- Marilyn Robinson Waldman (1943–1996), American historian
- Maurício Waldman (born 1955), Brazilian academic and activist
- Max Waldman (1919–1981), American photographer
- Michael Waldman, American attorney
- Michael Waldman (economist) (born 1955), American economist
- Michael Waldman (palaeontologist) (1941–2025), British palaeontologist
- Mickey Waldman (1942–2008), American radio personality
- Milton Waldman (1895–1976), American writer and historian
- Morris D. Waldman (1879–1963), Hungarian-American rabbi and social worker
- Myron Waldman (1908–2006), American animator
- Randy Waldman (born 1955), American musician
- Robert Waldman (born 1936), American composer
- Ronnie Waldman (1914–1978), British television executive
- Scott Waldman, American scientist
- Steve Waldman (born 1970), American programmer
- Steven Waldman, American journalist
- Suzyn Waldman (born 1946), American sports broadcaster
- Ted Waldman (1899–1987), American vaudeville entertainer
- Tom Waldman (1922–1985), American screenwriter
- Waldo Waldman, American author
- Wendy Waldman (born 1950), American musician

== Fictional characters ==
- Doctor Waldman, character in the novel Frankenstein

== Other uses ==
- Anthony Waldman House

== See also ==
- Waldmann
