= A Wilhelm Scream discography =

- Studio albums: 5
- Extended plays: 3
- Music videos: 7
- Split albums: 1
- Cassettes: 3

The following article features the complete discography of the Massachusetts based melodic hardcore band A Wilhelm Scream, including their earlier releases under the names Smackin' Isaiah and Koen.

== Studio albums ==
Year	Information
1999	The Way to a Girl's Heart Is Through Her Boyfriend's Stomach: Released: 1999, 2003 (reissue); Label: Tank Records, All About Records (reissue); Formats: CD; Notes: Released and reissued under Smackin' Isaiah
2001	Benefits Of Thinking Out Loud: Released: 2001, 2002 (reissue), 2003 (reissue); Label: Tank Records, Jump Start Records (both reissues); Formats: CD; Notes: Released and first reissued under Smackin' Isaiah, then reissued under A Wilhelm Scream
2004	Mute Print: Released: April 20, 2004, September, 2009 (vinyl); Label: Nitro Records (CD), The Vinyl Collective Cooperative Label (vinyl); Formats: CD, vinyl
2005	Ruiner: Released: August 16, 2005 (Nitro Records CD), October 4, 2005 (vinyl), October 9, 2006 (Shock Records CD); Label: Nitro Records (CD, vinyl), Shock Records (CD); Formats: CD, vinyl
2007	Career Suicide: Released: October 9, 2007 (CD), July 29, 2008 (vinyls); Label: Nitro Records (CD), Jump Start Records (vinyl), Ass-Card Records (vinyl); Formats: CD, vinyl
2013	Partycrasher: Released: November 5, 2013 (CD); Label: No Idea Records (CD); Formats: CD
2022	Lose Your Delusion: Released: April 15, 2022 (CD, vinyl, digital download); Label: Creator-Destructor Records; Formats: CD, vinyl
2026	Cheap Heat: Released: February 27, 2026 (CD, vinyl, digital download); Label: Creator-Destructor Records; Formats: CD, vinyl

== Extended plays ==
Year	Information
2002	The Champagne of Bands... We Know Sexy: Label: Fork In Hand Records; Formats: CD; Notes: Released under Smackin' Isaiah
2006	Diver: Released: February 8, 2006; Label: Jump Start Records; Formats: vinyl
2009	A Wilhelm Scream: Label: Paper + Plastick; Formats: vinyl (including CD), digital download

== Music videos ==
Year	Song	Director
2002	"Send Off"	Unknown
2004	"Mute Print"	Unknown
2005	"Famous Friends and Fashion Drunks"	Unknown
2006	"The Soft Sell"	Scott Culver
2007	"5 to 9"	Ben Thornley
2007	"Die While We're Young"	Ben Thornley
2008	"I Wipe My Ass With Showbiz"	Ben Thornley
2009	"Fun Time"	Ben Thornley
2010	"Australias"	Alex Gorosh

== Split albums ==
Year	Information
2000	6:6:6: Label: Tank Records; Formats: CD; Notes: Released under the name Smackin' Isaiah, in collaboration with Moronique and Merrick

== Cassettes ==
Year	Information
1996	The Big Fall...: Label: Koenmusic; Formats: Cassette; Notes: Released under the name Koen
1997	Give Girls More Beer...: Label: Numbskull Productions; Formats: Cassette; Notes: Released under the name Smackin' Isaiah
1998	Gets Eaten Alive!: Label: Numbskull Productions; Formats: Cassette; Notes: Released under the name Smackin' Isaiah
