= Walden (disambiguation) =

Walden is a book by Henry David Thoreau.

Walden may also refer to:

- Walden Pond, a body of water in Massachusetts where Thoreau once lived and after which his book is named
- Walden Ponds Wildlife Habitat, Boulder County, Colorado (not to be confused with Walden Pond)

== Place names ==
=== Antarctica ===
- Cape Walden, an ice-covered cape at the northwest termination of Evans Peninsula

=== Canada ===
- Walden, Calgary, a community in Calgary, Alberta
- Walden, Nova Scotia
- Walden, Ontario, now part of the city of Greater Sudbury

=== United States ===
- Walden, Colorado
- Walden, Georgia
- Walden, New York
- Walden, Oregon
- Walden, Tennessee
- Walden, Vermont
- Walden Galleria, a shopping mall in Buffalo, New York
- Walden Ridge (or Walden's Ridge), a mountain ridge and escarpment in Tennessee
- Walden Township (disambiguation)
- Walden–Jackson County Airport, Colorado

=== United Kingdom ===
- Walden, North Yorkshire
- Walden Head, North Yorkshire
- Walden Stubbs, North Yorkshire
- Walden Abbey, a former Benedictine monastery in Saffron Walden
- King's Walden, a civil parish in Hertfordshire
- Little Walden, Essex
  - RAF Little Walden (also known as Hadstock), a former World War II airfield in Essex
- Saffron Walden, Essex
  - Saffron Walden (UK Parliament constituency)
  - Saffron Walden Railway, a branch of the Great Eastern Railway
- St Paul's Walden, a village and civil parish in Hertfordshire

== Films ==
- Walden (1968 film), an avant-garde film by Lithuanian-American filmmaker Jonas Mekas
- Walden (2017), a U.S. short film about Don Henley's Walden Woods Project
- Walden: Life in the Woods (2017), a U.S. movie directed by Alex Harvey
- Walden (2023 film), a U.S. thriller film starring Emile Hirsch

== Education ==
- Walden College, a fictitious, third-rate academic institution in the Doonesbury comics
- Walden School (disambiguation)
- Walden Seminary, original name of Philander Smith College, in Little Rock, Arkansas
- Walden University, a private online for-profit university
- Walden University (Tennessee), in Nashville

== Other uses ==
- Walden (name), a given name and surname, including a list of people with the name
- Walden (play), a 2021 climate fiction play by American writer Amy Berryman
- Walden, a game, a 2017 video game
- Walden 7, an apartment building located in Sant Just Desvern, Barcelona, Spain
- Waldenbooks, an American mall-based book store
- Walden Guitars, an acoustic guitar manufacturer based in Lilan, China
- Walden Media, a film production company
- Walden Motorsport, an Australian race car preparation outfit
- Walden reductor, a metal reduction column filled with silver
- Amelia Elizabeth Walden Award, an American young adult literature annual award established in 2008

== See also ==
- Walden Two, a book by B.F. Skinner
- "My Walden", a song by Nightwish from Endless Forms Most Beautiful
- Wald (disambiguation)
- Walde
- Waldman
- Waldmann
- Waldner
