= Lose Your Delusion =

Studio album by A Wilhelm Scream
- Released: April 14, 2022
- Studio: Anchor End Studio (Trevor Reilly's home studio in New Bedford, Massachusetts)
- Genre: Melodic hardcore, thrash metal
- Length: 33:59
- Label: Creator-Destructor Records
- Producer: Trevor Reilly, James Whitten

A Wilhelm Scream chronology
Partycrasher (2013)	Lose Your Delusion (2022)

Lose Your Delusion is the seventh overall studio album by Massachusetts-based melodic hardcore band A Wilhelm Scream, and the fifth album under the A Wilhelm Scream name. It was released on April 14, 2022, on Creator-Destructor Records. This is the first AWS in 9 years since their sixth studio album Partycrasher, as well as their first album to feature Senses Fail guitarist Jason Milbank who relieved Mike Supina in 2019, though the latter did provide some guitar parts on the record.

== Information ==
In a 2015 interview, Trevor Reilly had confirmed a follow up to Partycrasher. While in the process of writing new music and touring at the same time, guitarist Mike Supina had left the band in 2018 after 10 years with the band. In 2019, he was replaced with Senses Fail guitarist Jason Milbank while the band played anniversary shows of their two albums Mute Print and Ruiner with former guitarist Chris Levesque. Trevor Reilly started building a recording studio and rehearsal room in his home with his wife that year, and it was completed in the beginning of 2021, with the band commencing recording. This was the same year Jason Milbank became a full-time member of the band. Trevor produced the album with James Whitten. Kyle Black mixed the album, and Trevor's father Joe took the task of mastering.

The band released their first single, "Be One to No One" onto YouTube on January 6, 2022 as a lyric video. 4 days later, they announced the name of the album on their Instagram page. They uploaded another lyric video onto YouTube a month later for Apocalypse Porn on February 10, 2022. They later released two music videos for the singles "GIMMETHESHAKES" on March 16 and "Figure Eights in My Head" on April 11, the latter being uploaded four days before the album's release.

== Track listing ==
Lose Your Delusion track listing
Track no.	Title	Runtime
1.	Acushnet Avenue at Night	04:53
2.	The Enigma	03:09
3.	GIMMETHESHAKES	02:21
4.	...And Big Nasty Was Its Name-O	02:15
5.	Yo Canada	02:42
6.	Figure Eights in My Head	02:21
7.	I'm Gonna Work It Out	03:11
8.	Apocalypse Porn	03:31
9.	Be One to No One	02:59
10.	Lose Your Delusion	03:29
11.	Downtown Start II	03:02

== Personnel ==
=== A Wilhelm Scream ===
- Nuno Perreira – lead vocals
- Trevor Reilly – guitar, vocals, production
- Jason Milbank – guitar
- Bryan J. Robinson – bass guitar
- Nicholas Pasquale Angellini – drums

=== Additional musicians ===
- Chris Levesque – guitar (tracks 3, 5, and 8)
- Mike Supina – guitar (tracks 4 and 8)
- Sean O'Brien – backing vocals (track 4)

=== Production ===
- James Whitten - co-production
- Kyle Black - mixing
- Joe Reilly - mastering
