= Help Wanted =

Help Wanted may refer to:

- Employment, traditionally offered by a "Help Wanted" sign or classified advertising

== Books ==
- Help Wanted, a 1955 children's book featuring Donald Duck
- Help Wanted!, a 1988 children's novel in Girls of Canby Hall franchise by Emily Chase
- Help Wanted (novel), 2024 novel by Adelle Waldman

== Music ==
- Help Wanted (The Chi-Lites album), a 1998 album by The Chi-Lites
- Help Wanted (Eric Avery album), a 2008 debut solo album by Eric Avery
- "Help Wanted", a 1968 single by The Mirettes
- "Help Wanted", a 1979 single by Legs Diamond
- "Help Wanted", a song from the 1997 album Funcrusher Plus by Company Flow

== Television episodes ==
- "Help Wanted", a 1962 episode of The Hathaways
- "Help Wanted", a 1972 episode of Wait Till Your Father Gets Home
- Police Squad!: Help Wanted!, a 1985 Paramount Home Video volume of Police Squad! containing 3 episodes from the series
- "Help Wanted", a 1987 episode of Gung Ho
- "Help Wanted" (SpongeBob SquarePants), the 1999 pilot of SpongeBob SquarePants
- "Help Wanted" (Gilmore Girls), a 2002 episode of Gilmore Girls
- "Help Wanted", a 2007 episode of Aliens in America
- "Help Want-Ed", a 2008 episode of Best Ed
- "Help Wanted", a 2009 episode of Tyler Perry's House
- "Help Wanted", a 2012 episode of Pawn Stars

== Other ==
- Help Wanted, a 1911 comedy silent film starring Joseph Graybill
- Help Wanted (1915 film), a 1915 American drama silent film
- "Help Wanted", a 2002 episode from the radio show This American Life
- Help Wanted (video game), a 2008 video game for the Wii
- Five Nights at Freddy's: Help Wanted, a 2019 video game
  - Five Nights at Freddy's: Help Wanted 2, a 2023 video game and a direct sequel to the 2019 video game

== See also ==
- Help Wanted, Male, a 1945 novella in the Trouble in Triplicate mystery novel collection by Nero Wolfe
- "Help Wanted, Desperately", a 1967 episode of Please Don't Eat the Daisies
- "Help Wanted - Firefly", a 1970 episode of The Bugaloos
- "Help Wanted: Mommy", a 1986 episode of Alvin and the Chipmunks
