= Party Crasher =

Party Crasher may refer to:

- Party Crasher (album), a 2008 album by Per Gessle
- Party crasher, a person who attends invite-only events without an invitation
- Partycrasher, a 2013 album by A Wilhelm Scream
- "Party Crasher" (Modern Family), an episode of Modern Family
- "Party Crasher", a song by The Featherz from their 2017 album Five-Year-Itch
- "The Party Crasher", the main antagonist of the 1991 film The Hard Way
