= Career suicide =

Career suicide may refer to:

- An action that ruins one's career
- Career Suicide (band), a Canadian hardcore band
- Career Suicide, a 2004 album by Lennon
- Career Suicide (album), a 2007 album by A Wilhelm Scream
- Career Suicide, an HBO show by comedian Chris Gethard
