= Help Wanted (novel) =

2024 novel by Adelle Waldman

- Author: Adelle Waldman
- Language: English
- Genre: Fiction
- Publisher: W. W. Norton & Company
- Publication date: March 5, 2024
- Pages: 288
- ISBN: 978-1-324-02044-8

Help Wanted is a 2024 novel written by Adelle Waldman.

The author, Adelle Waldman, worked for six months in a retail store while researching the novel.

== Plot ==
The story of a cast of characters who all work for Town Square, a big-box mega-retailer in Potterstown, a town near the Catskill Mountains in upstate New York. Potterstown is experiencing economic decline due to the loss of IBM jobs. Big Will is the store manager. The Movement team is responsible for stocking products in the store, with executive manager Meredith, group manager Little Will, and team members Nicole, Ruby, Diego, Val, Milo, Joyce, Travis, Raymond, and Callie. The team usually works in early morning shifts prior to opening time.

When Big Will announces his resignation, his employees take on the opportunity to become store manager. Eventually, employees split into factions supporting and opposing Meredith as store manager.

== Critical reception ==
Help Wanted generally had positive reviews. Kevin Power of The Guardian called it "a funny novel, as well as deeply humane and very angry." For The New York Times, Alexandra Chang praised the plot development: "Waldman is skilled at building momentum and tension through intricacies of plot." Kirkus Reviews found "emotional intelligence, wry humor, and sensitivity to matters of money and class" similar to Waldman's previous work The Love Affairs of Nathaniel P.

The depiction of retail workers was also a focus of praise. Katy Waldman (no relation) of The New Yorker wrote that the novel "washes labor in a stately, almost Steinbeckian light, emphasizing its difficulty but also its dignity." People magazine named it one of the best books of March 2024 for having "wonderfully believable" characters. Jordan Kisner of The Atlantic also praised the character development: "...although none of these characters is especially charismatic, you nevertheless find yourself wishing at one point or another that each of them could get the promotion." Kisner also found the plot to be relatable: "...The relentless grind in which these characters find themselves won’t change. There’s little opportunity for any real transformation, hope, or happy ending. And yet this is the plot that guides the lives of millions of Americans."

However, the character development was questioned by some critics. Reviewing the book for NPR's Fresh Air, Maureen Corrigan had a mixed review, praising the "psychological acuity" while finding the character development of the store workers to be limited. Similarly, Publishers Weekly commented: "Though Waldman touches only briefly on the employees’ personal lives, making it difficult to keep all the characters straight, the narrative builds to a satisfying and surprising conclusion."
