= Walden School =

Walden School may refer to one of several educational institutions:

- The Walden School Hyderabad (formerly known as The Magnet School), an independent K-12 Jiddu Krishnamurti school in Hyderabad, India
- Walden School (Saffron Walden) (formerly known as Friends' School), a Quaker independent school located in Saffron Walden, Essex
- The Walden School, a private summer music camp in Dublin, New Hampshire
- The Walden School (Media, Pennsylvania), a member of the Association of Delaware Valley Independent Schools
- Walden School (Altadena, California), a private school in Pasadena, California
- Walden School (Louisville), a private school in Louisville, Kentucky
- Walden School (New York City), a defunct private day school in Manhattan
- Walden School (Vermont), a public school in Walden, Vermont
- Walden School, a school at The Learning Center for the Deaf, Framingham, Massachusetts
- Walden Elementary School in Orange County, New York
- Walden III Middle/High School, an alternative school in Racine, Wisconsin
- Walden Middle School (Kansas City) a public school in Kansas City, Missouri

== See also ==
- Walden (disambiguation)
