= Joseph Brings House =

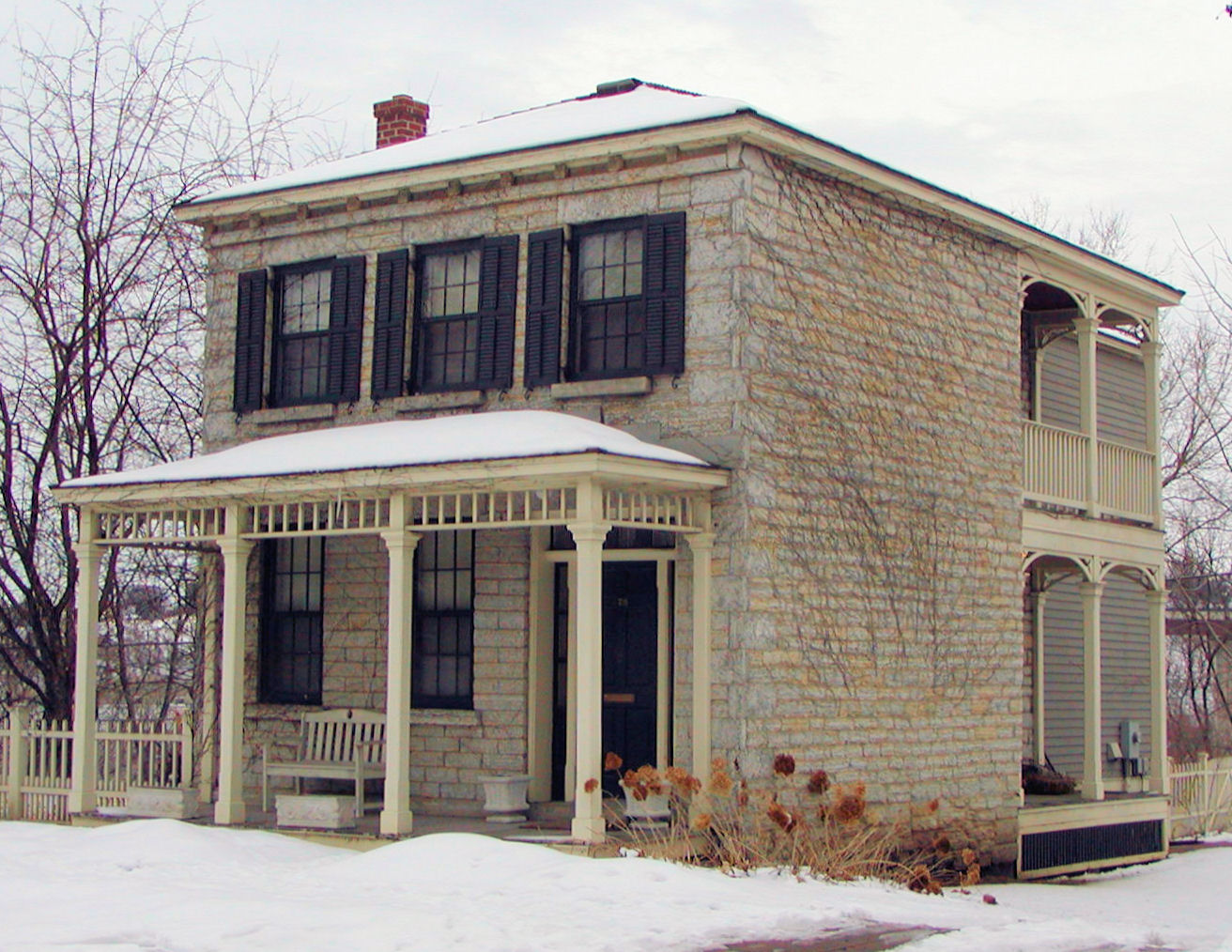
- Interactive map of the Joseph Brings House area
- Alternative names: Johan and Maria Magdalena Schilliger House

General information
- Location: 178 Goodrich Avenue, Saint Paul, Minnesota, United States
- Coordinates: 44°56′15.5″N 93°6′27.5″W
- Construction started: 1859
- Completed: 1862

The Joseph Brings House, also known as the Johan and Maria Magdalena Schilliger House, is a historical residence in Saint Paul, Minnesota, United States, built of local limestone. Originally located at 314 Smith Avenue North, the home was built between 1859 and 1862 by John Schilliger and purchased by Brings in 1863. A cooper, Joseph Brings (1820–1899) was born in Germany and came to Saint Paul in 1857.

The house was nominated to the National Register of Historic Places (NRHP) in 1983 as part of the West Seventh Street Early Limestone Houses Thematic Resource, along with the Anthony Waldman House and Martin Weber House. The Brings House received an NRHP reference number, #83004868, but the listing was never finalized. None of the three buildings are officially on the National Register. It was listed with listing code DR, meaning "Date Received" and nomination pending, in 1983.
