= The Way to a Girl's Heart Is Through Her Boyfriend's Stomach =

The Way To A Girl's Heart Is Through Her Boyfriend's Stomach

Studio album by Smackin' Isaiah
- Released: 2000, 2003 (reissue)
- Recorded: Black and Blue Studios, New Bedford, MA
- Genres: Punk rock, pop punk, melodic hardcore, skate punk
- Length: 37:24
- Labels: Tank Records, All About Records (reissue)
- Producers: Trevor Reilly, Joe Reilly, Smackin' Isaiah

A Wilhelm Scream chronology
6:6:6 (2000)	The Way To A Girl's Heart Is Through... (1999)	Benefits Of Thinking Out Loud (2001)

The Way To A Girl's Heart Is Through Her Boyfriend's Stomach, released in 2000 through Tank Records, is the debut full-length release from the Massachusetts based melodic hardcore band now known as A Wilhelm Scream.

== Information ==
Originally recorded and released through Tank Records in 2000 under their at the time current name, Smackin' Isaiah. It was reissued in 2003 by All About Records due to the rarity of the original release, as it had only been produced in a small number. In spite of the band having changed their name at this time, it was still reissued under Smackin' Isaiah. Today, both copies are almost impossible to find and have become collectables, alongside other Smackin' Isaiah material, for hardcore A Wilhelm Scream fans.

A Wilhelm Scream considers this album as their first real release, as all the songs had been written after they had a complete and steady line-up. They have also stated that this, in retrospect, is their most cheerful record.

Despite the original and reissue having identical covers, the colour of the CDs are different; the original being blue, whilst the reissue is red. The disc-tray insert includes a copy of an autographed poster addressed to the band from porn star Ron Jeremy. It is displayed in color on the original, but is black-and-white on the re-issue.

As this album uses copyrighted sound clips from major Hollywood films and has two hidden tracks, the following statement is written on the inside left fold of the tray card: "Big entertainment conglomorates, please don't sue the fuck out of us for using your movies for our stupid, played-out punk rock album sound bytes. The "bonus tracks" were recorded live and extremely drunk at some club in Providence.

In 2019, the album was re-released in the form of 300 copies on vinyl.

== Track listing ==
Lyrics by Trevor Reilly, with the exceptions of #2 by Reilly and Nuno Pereira, #7 by Reilly and Jonathan Teves and #8 by Pereira. Music by A Wilhelm Scream.

No.	Title	Length
1.	"Wyoming State"	2:43
2.	"Bowling"	2:51
3.	"Which is Worse?"	2:02
4.	"Mob Life"	1:37
5.	"Beer and Loafing in New Bedford"	3:03
6.	"1957"	0:50
7.	"Mushmouth"	2:17
8.	"Forget Her"	2:45
9.	"September 9th"	2:08
10.	"Shot"	5:47

There are also two hidden tracks on the CD, one is an alternate version of "Chock Full O' Angst" off their earlier "Give Girls More Beer" demo tape. (2:06) and the other is a drunken live cover of "Embrace" by straight edge hardcore band Ignite" (3:46)

== Personnel ==
- Nuno Pereira - vocals
- Trevor Reilly - guitar, backing vocals
- John Carvalho - guitar
- Jonathan Teves - bass, backing vocals
- Nicholas Pasquale Angelini - drums

== Details ==
- Recorded, engineered and mixed by Joe Reilly
- Produced by Smackin' Isaiah, Joe Reilly
- Co-produced by Joe Reilly and Smackin' Isaiah
- Recorded at Black and Blue Studios, New Bedford, MA
- Mastered by Rich Rescigno at Mountainside Studios
- Published by AdamsCrackMusic!/ASCAP
