= A Wilhelm Scream =

American rock band

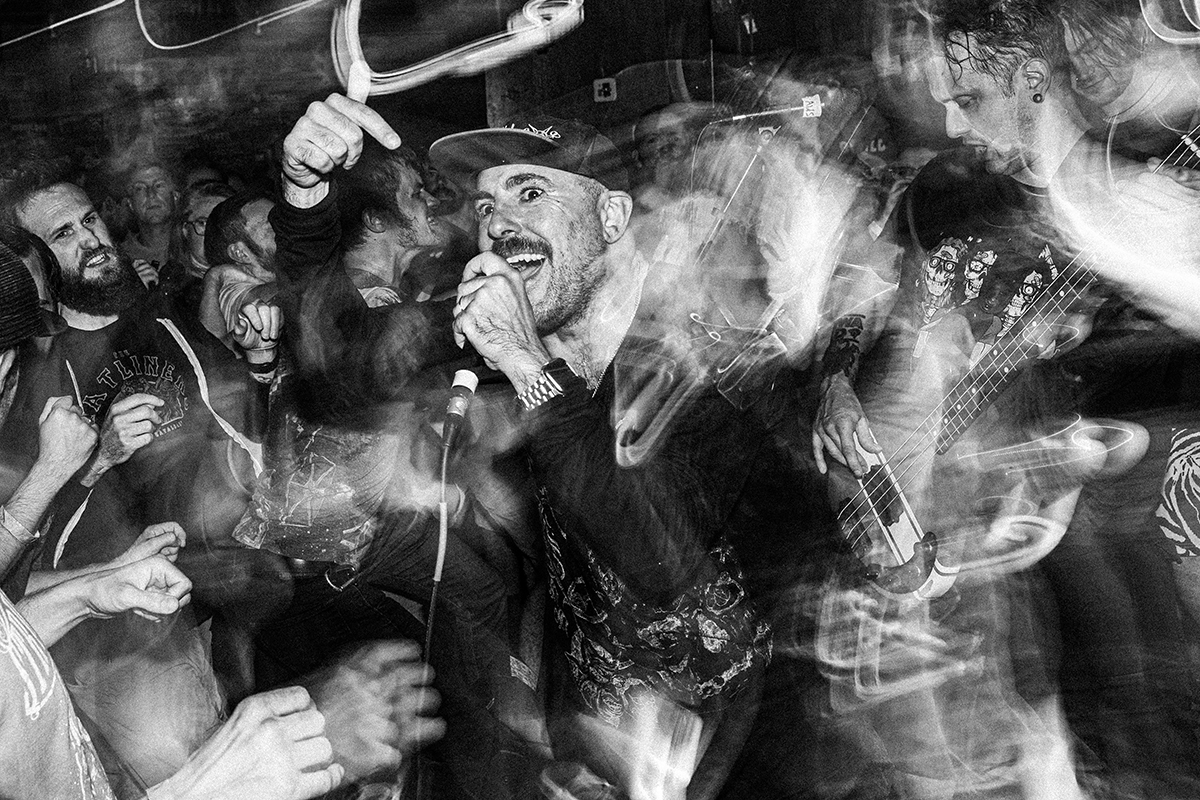
- A Wilhelm Scream in Norfolk, Virginia, in 2022

Background information
- Also known as: Smackin' Isaiah, Koen
- Origin: New Bedford, Massachusetts, U.S.
- Genres: Melodic hardcore; punk rock; skate punk; heavy metal
- Years active: 1993–present
- Labels: Creator-Destructor Records: No Idea; Shock; Paper + Plastick; Nitro; Jump Start; All About Records; Ass-Card; Fork in Hand; Tank Records; Lockjaw Records
- Members: Nuno Pereira; Trevor Reilly; Ben Murray; Brian J. Robinson; Nicholas Pasquale Angelini
- Past members: John Carvalho; Jonathan Teves; Mat Demelo; Curtiss Lopez; Chris Levesque; Mike Supina; Jason Milbank
- Website: awilhelmscream.com

A Wilhelm Scream (abbreviated as AWS) is a melodic hardcore band from New Bedford, Massachusetts, formed in 1993. Sonically, their music has been compared to that of Strung Out, Hot Water Music, Propagandhi, and Strike Anywhere. Their name is a reference to the Wilhelm scream, a famous stock sound effect mainly used in films. The band previously went by the names Koen and Smackin' Isaiah, though the latter was the only name to be used in any major releases. "The reason for the name changes from Koen to Smackin' Isaiah, then to A Wilhelm Scream was really a matter of them adding new members, and progressing/maturing as a band."

== History ==
=== Pre-formation and early years (1993–2000) ===
In 1993, drummer Trevor Reilly, guitarist John Carvalho and bassist Jonathan Teves formed the band Adam's Crack and recorded a Nirvana-inspired demo cassette. In 1994 Reilly and Carvalho started a side band with Nuno Pereira on vocals, and others. The side band played one show before disbanding. Members from the two bands would merge into one, taking the name Koen. The line-up of Koen consisted of Pereira (vocals), Reilly (drums), Teves (bass), Carvalho (guitar) and friend Mat Demelo (guitar and trumpet). Under the name Koen, the band released one cassette titled "The Big Fall...", this time with their sound evolving more into skate punk and ska. In 1997, the band changed its name again, this time to Smackin' Isaiah, and released a cassette titled "Give Girls More Beer...". Mat Demelo left the band shortly after. During this time, Reilly would switch between drumming and guitar duties, with an unknown drummer playing in the band for a brief amount of time. Nicholas Angelini was eventually tapped to play drums on a permanent basis. In 1998, Smackin' Isaiah released another demo cassette, titled "Gets Eaten Alive".

=== Tank Records era (2000–2002) ===
The band's first CD release was on Tank Records, a record label created by Carvalho and Teves. The CD was a split release with the bands Moronique and Merrick, entitled 6:6:6 after the number of tracks each band contributed. Soon after, the band released its debut album, The Way to a Girl's Heart Is Through Her Boyfriend's Stomach. The band considers this their first "real" release, as all the songs had been written after Angelini joined the band. In retrospect, they consider it their most cheerful record. It was reissued 2 years later on All About Records, but the band stayed with Tank Records to release its second album, Benefits Of Thinking Out Loud. During the album's recording, the band members had a strained relationship as they argued over its production. Six outtakes from the album's recording sessions were compiled onto an EP entitled The Champagne of Bands... We Know Sexy released by Fork in Hand Records. Following its release, Carvalho left the band. Christopher Levesque quickly replaced him.

=== Final name change and Nitro Records years (2003–2009) ===
With the band taking a more serious approach on Benefits, they decided to once more change their name, finally settling on A Wilhelm Scream. Signing with new label Jump Start Records, they re-released Benefits of Thinking Out Loud under their new name. After touring the United States and Canada a few times, they then began recording their next album, Mute Print, with Jump Start. For the recording of the album, the band decided to put "as much shit as you can possibly fit into a song and pull off live" into the songs, to which they attribute their faster, more aggressive and more technical sound. This album was recorded and produced by Descendents drummer Bill Stevenson and Jason Livermore, whom the band looked up to. Although the album was finished while the band was signed to Jump Start, the rights to the album were then bought by Nitro Records, who released it in 2004.

Only a year after Mute Print, the band released a second record on Nitro, again produced by Stevenson and Livermore. The record, entitled Ruiner, was released on August 16, 2005. Following stress from touring, founding member Jonathan Teves left the band, and was replaced by bassist Curtiss Lopez. They then embarked on their first European tour with Lagwagon, and also toured with Less Than Jake. Midway through the latter tour, Lopez abruptly quit the band. This left A Wilhelm Scream without a permanent bassist until April when Brian J. Robinson, former bassist of the punk band The Fullblast, joined the band. The band continued to tour extensively throughout 2006. They also released a 7-inch EP titled Diver on Jump Start Records. This was because the title track was recorded during the Mute Print sessions, but left off the album, and thus was not purchased by Nitro Records.

In 2007, the band returned to the Blasting Room again, with Stevenson and Livermore to record their third album with Nitro Records. The record, according to the band, was "very very fast" and a few songs were dropped for not being fast enough. The record, Career Suicide, was released on October 9, 2007. However, only two weeks before its street date, long-time guitarist Chris Levesque announced that he was leaving the band, elaborating with the following statement:

I have maintained for the duration of my time in Smackin' Isaiah/A Wilhelm Scream that when it stopped being fun, I would give it up. The bottom line here is that I just don't enjoy the day-in, day-out grind of being on tour anymore ... There are no personal or creative differences between any of us. None of that bullshit. I still love this band and everything it stands for. The six years that I've spent in SI/AWS have been the best of my life. We've accomplished more than I ever expected, and I take with me with more amazing memories than most people experience in a lifetime.

The band began their tour in support of Career Suicide with several rotating guitarists, before Mike Supina, formerly of the Detroit-based band Alucard, was announced as Levesque's permanent replacement. The tour brought the band to over eighteen countries, finishing in September 2008. Following its conclusion, guitarist Trevor Reilly announced in his blog that the band would take a break for the rest of the year, but implied that they would write new songs soon. In a post to celebrate the new year, the band released b-side "The I Hate ___ Club", which was left off the album at the producers' request. The band were also demoing new songs.

=== Label Changes, Self-Titled EP and Partycrasher (2009–2013) ===
In June 2009, the band signed to Paper + Plastick while working on a new album. Their first release for the label was a 5-song self-titled EP, mixed by Matt Bayles, released on November 20, 2009.

In July 2010, the band returned to the studio to write and record their next studio album. A release date was expected sometime in 2010. They took a break from recording in September, however, to support Comeback Kid in their Canadian tour for their upcoming fourth studio album. They returned to the studio when their performing dates were complete. The band recorded the album themselves, in their own studio with all the mixing once again being done by the crew at The Blasting Room. While touring South America in November 2012 they announced that the next album would be released in spring 2013.

On November 5, 2013, the band released "Partycrasher" via No Idea Records. It was produced and engineered by Trevor J. Reilly and Mike Supina at Black & Blue Studio in New Bedford, MA

=== Touring years, Be One to No One and Lose Your Delusion (2014–2022) ===
In an interview on August 18, 2015, A Wilhelm Scream confirmed that they have already started writing on a follow-up to 'Partycrasher'. From 2014 through 2018 the band toured extensively while intermittently writing new music. Following their success of recording "Partycrasher" in a local studio rather than going to The Blasting Room or another studio, Trevor Reilly committed himself to building a full studio and permanent rehearsal space for the band in his own home. Construction of the studio began in 2019 and was finished in the summer of 2021, with the band beginning recording new material in fall of 2021.

Lead guitarist Mike Supina left the band after finishing up A Wilhem Scream's touring commitments in 2018, ending his ten-year run. In the interim the band shows with a mix of lineups in 2019; Mute Print and Ruiner anniversary shows with former guitarist Chris Levesque and shows with songs from the self-titled EP and Partycrasher with Senses Fail guitarist Jason Milbank. Milbank was initially brought on as a session musician for festival dates in Europe but later was confirmed by Trevor to be Supina's full time replacement and would be playing on the upcoming new songs.

In March 2021 Nuno Pereira announced that after a prolonged legal dispute that he, Trevor, and Nick had acquired the rights to all of A Wilhelm Scream's former releases with Nitro Records. The band did their first North America tour in three years when they did a fall run with Canadian hardcore band Comeback Kid on the East Coast of the United States and Canada. During that same period, the band announced their signing to Creator Destructor Records.

On January 6, 2022, A Wilhelm Scream released their first new song in nearly nine years, titled Be One to No One, along with an accompanying lyric music video. Then, on January 10, 2022, the band announced their fifth studio album, entitled Lose Your Delusion, would be released on April 14 of that year. Departing from their previous experience of working with Bill Stevenson and his associated staff at The Blasting Room, the album was recorded fully in guitarist Trevor Reilly’s studio Anchor End in New Bedford, Massachusetts, and produced by the band, while mixing was handled by Paramore producer Kyle Black and mastering was done by Joe Reilly.

=== Partycrasher remaster and re-release, Cheap Heat (2023-present) ===
One November 5, 2023, A Wilhelm Scream released a remastered version of Partycrasher, featuring acoustic demos of the tracks "The Last Laugh" and "Devil Don't Know" and the unreleased track "Swallowed the Sea."

On January 8, 2026, the band announced their sixth studio album, Cheap Heat. The lead single "Midnight Ghost" was released that same day, along with an accompanying music video. Cheap Heat was released on February 27 that same year.

== Band members ==
=== Current ===
- Nuno Pereira – lead vocals (1993–present)
- Trevor Reilly – drums (1993–1997), rhythm guitar, co-lead vocals (1997–present)
- Nicholas Pasquale Angelini – drums (1998–present)
- Brian J. Robinson – bass, backing vocals (2006–present)
- Ben Murray – lead guitar (2022–present)

=== Former ===
- Jonathan Teves – bass, backing vocals (1993–2005)
- John Carvalho – lead guitar (1993–2001)
- Mat Demelo - rhythm guitar (1993–1997)
- Christopher Levesque – lead guitar (2001–2007)
- Curtiss Lopez – bass (2005–2006)
- Mike Supina – lead guitar (2008–2018)
- Jason Milbank – lead guitar (2019–2022)

== Discography ==
- The Way to a Girl's Heart Is Through Her Boyfriend's Stomach (as Smackin' Isaiah) (2000)
- Benefits of Thinking Out Loud (as Smackin' Isaiah) (2001)
- Mute Print (2004)
- Ruiner (2005)
- Career Suicide (2007)
- Partycrasher (2013)
- Lose Your Delusion (2022)
- Cheap Heat (2026)
