= Martin Weber House =

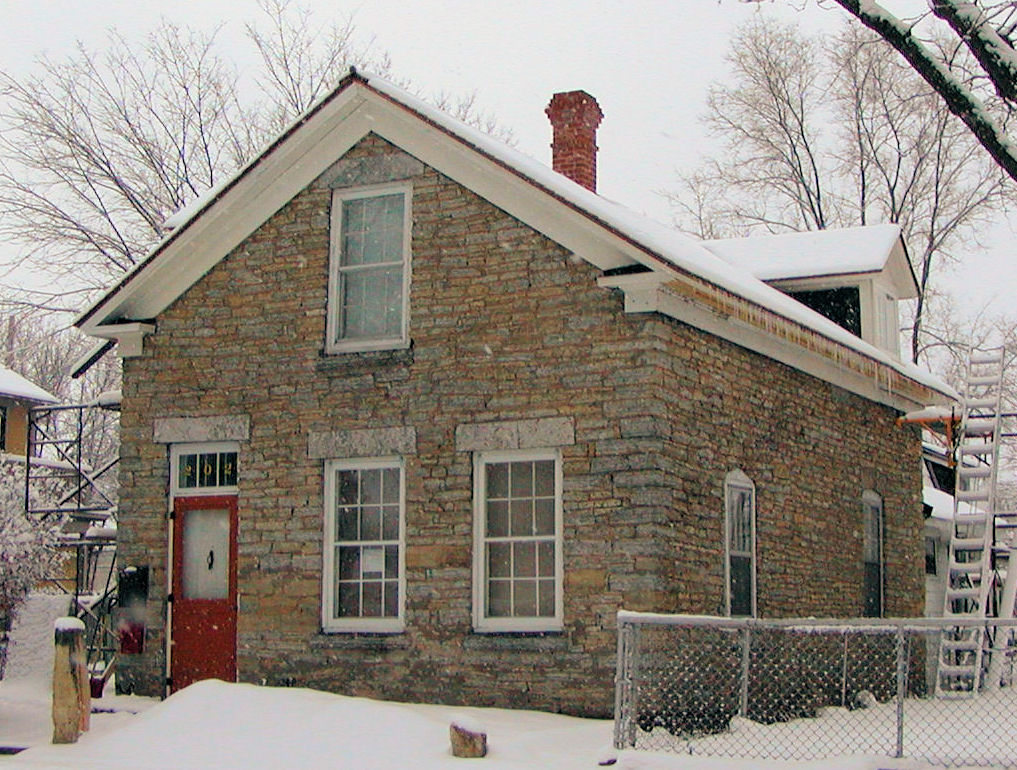
- Interactive map of the Martin Weber House area

General information
- Location: 202 McBoal Street, Saint Paul, Minnesota, United States
- Coordinates: 44°56′20″N 93°6′31″W
- Completed: 1867

The Martin Weber House is a historical residence in Saint Paul, Minnesota, United States. The house was built in 1867 of rough-cut limestone. It was the home of Catherin and Martin Weber; built by German immigrant stonemasons Jacob Amos and Christian Rhinehardt.

The house was nominated to the National Register of Historic Places (NRHP) in 1983 as part of the West Seventh Street Early Limestone Houses Thematic Resource, along with the Joseph Brings House and Anthony Waldman House. The Weber House received an NRHP reference number, #83004867, but the listing was never finalized. None of the three buildings are officially on the National Register. It was listed with listing code DR, meaning "Date Received" and nomination pending, in 1983.
