= The Love Affairs of Nathaniel P. =

2013 book by Adelle Waldman

- Author: Adelle Waldman
- Language: English
- Published: 2013 (Henry Holt and Company)
- Publication place: United States
- Media type: Print
- Pages: 242
- ISBN: 9780805097450
- OCLC: 811597630

The Love Affairs of Nathaniel P. is a novel by Adelle Waldman.

== Plot ==
The Love Affairs of Nathaniel P. focuses on the titular character, Nathaniel Piven, the "product of a postfeminist, 1980s childhood and politically correct, 1990s college education."

== Reception ==
The New York Times called the novel "small and specific, drained of history and ethnicity, attendant to the pangs of its social conscience but committed, still, to its fascination with the well-being of those who have already won." NPR said it is "a sharp and assured tale about a sharp and assured young man, who often acts like a dog." The Washington Post referred to the novel as "a delectable, dark account of Manhattan amour."
