= Adelle Waldman =

American novelist, columnist and blogger (born 1977)

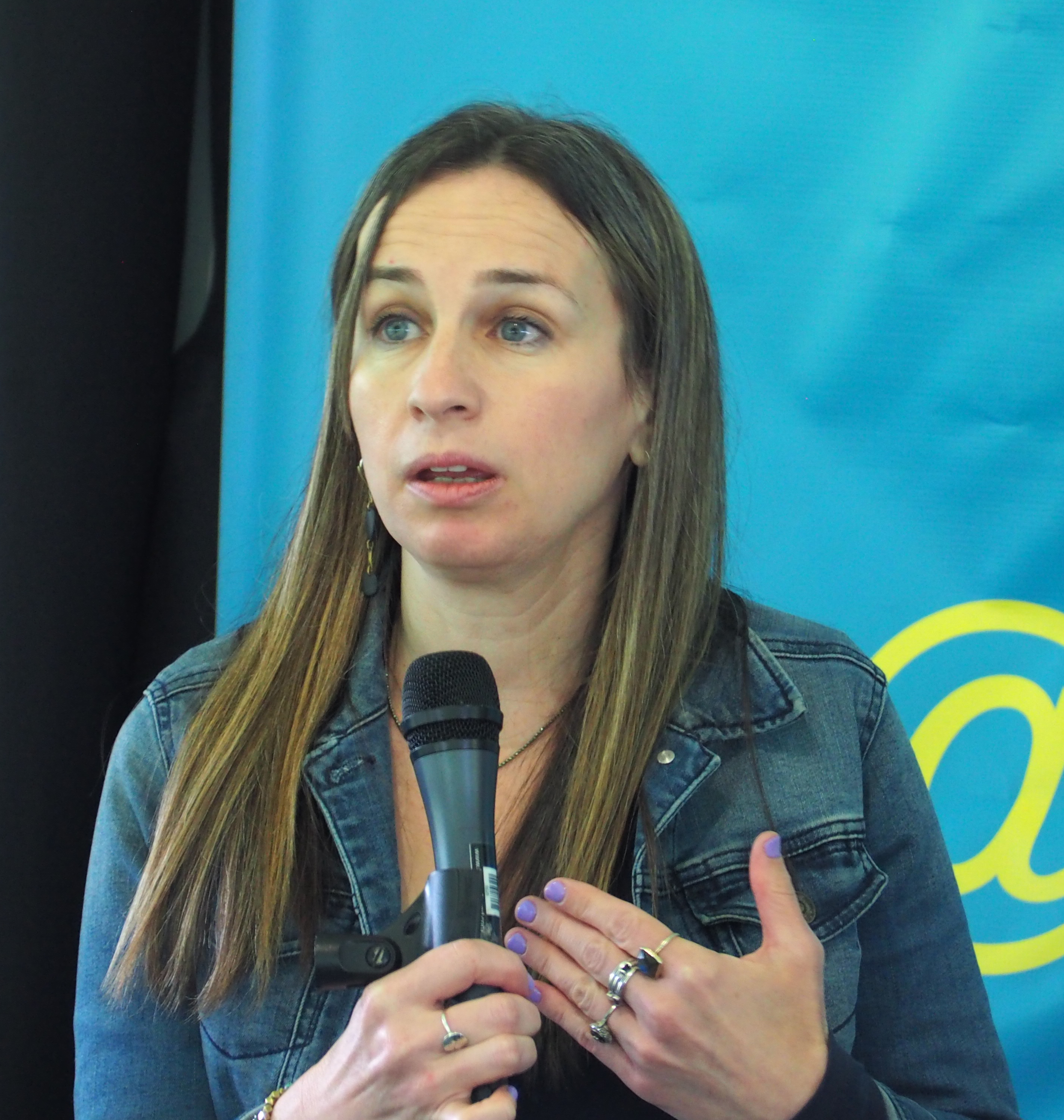
- Waldman at the 2024 Gaithersburg Book Festival
- Born: 1977 (age 48–49); Baltimore, Maryland
- Occupations: Magazine writer and novelist
- Relatives: Steve Randy Waldman (brother)
- Writing career
- Notable work: The Love Affairs of Nathaniel P. (2013)
- Website: Official website

Adelle Waldman (born 1977) is an American novelist, columnist and blogger. Her first novel, The Love Affairs of Nathaniel P., was published in 2013.

== Life and education ==
Waldman was born in Baltimore, Maryland, in 1977. Her brother, Steve Randy Waldman, blogs about finance and economics. She attended a Jewish elementary school and a Quaker high school.

Waldman graduated from Brown University in 1998. She later attended the Columbia University Graduate School of Journalism.

== Writing ==
=== Early career ===
Waldman worked as a reporter at the New Haven Register, located in New Haven, Connecticut; and The Plain Dealer, located in Cleveland, Ohio, and wrote a column for the website of The Wall Street Journal. She has written book reviews and essays for Slate, The New Republic, Vogue.com, and The New York Observer, among others. When her daughter was one year old, she woke up at 2:30am in order to work from 4 to 8am at a big box store. While writing The Love Affairs of Nathaniel P., she worked as an SAT tutor.

=== The Love Affairs of Nathaniel P. ===
Waldman published her first novel, The Love Affairs of Nathaniel P., in 2013. It was heralded as one of the year's best books. It follows Nate Piven, a writer living in Brooklyn, New York, and his romantic relationship with a woman whom Nate considers an intellectual match but with whom he finds other faults.

Waldman later published a novella telling the same story from the point of view of Aurit, a female friend of Nate's. It was released as a Kindle single. An excerpt of The Love Affairs of Nathaniel P., read by Waldman, appeared on the Lit Hub/Podglomerate podcast Storybound, accompanied by an original score from singer-songwriter Haley Johnsen.

=== Help Wanted ===
In 2018, Waldman got a low-wage job unloading boxes at a big-box store near her home in the Catskills. She said in an interview with New York Magazine that after working the job for several weeks, she "felt passionate that there's something worth writing about." The store was the inspiration for her second novel Help Wanted, which was released in 2024.

== Personal life ==
Waldman is married to journalist Evan Hughes. They have a daughter. In 2016, they moved from the Fort Greene apartment they bought in 2009 to Rhinebeck New York.

== Selected bibliography ==
- The Love Affairs of Nathaniel P.. New York, NY: Henry Holt and Company. 2013. ISBN 978-0-8050-9746-7.
- "Why the Marriage Plot Need Never Get Old". The New Yorker. November 14, 2013.
- "The Ideal Marriage, According to Novels". The New Yorker. January 15, 2016.
- "Jay McInerney's Middle-Aged Malaise". The New Yorker. August 1, 2016.
- Help Wanted. New York, NY: W. W. Norton & Company. 2024. ISBN 978-1-324-02044-8.
