= Anthony Waldman House =

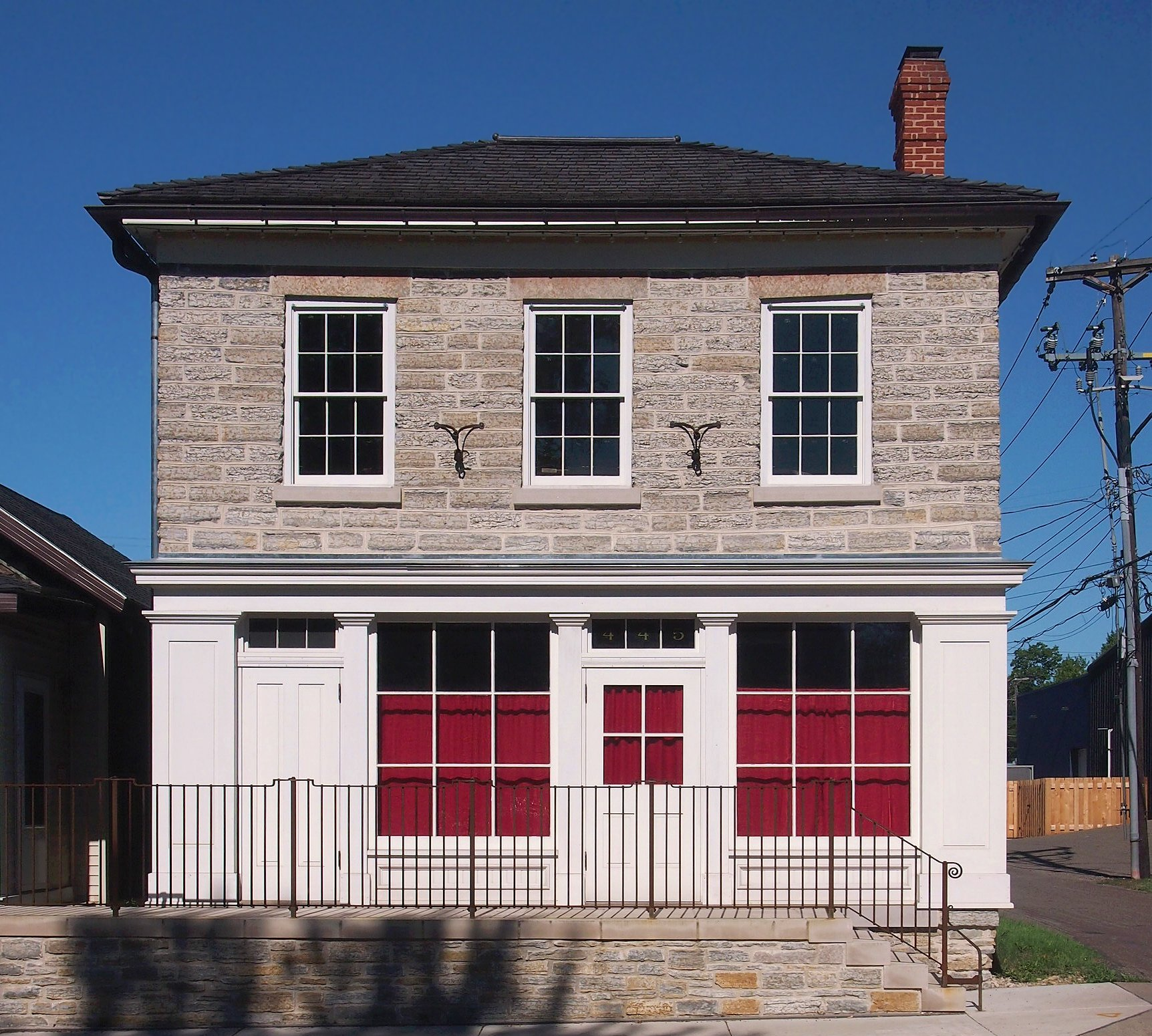
- Interactive map of the Anthony Waldman House area

General information
- Location: 445 Smith Avenue North, Saint Paul, Minnesota, United States
- Coordinates: 44°56′18″N 93°6′34″W
- Completed: 1864

Until recently, the limestone building at 445 Smith Avenue North, St. Paul, Minnesota, United States, was known in surveys and local architectural history books as the Anthony Waldman House. However, recent research and analysis of the building has revealed that the Waldman House was not in fact built by Waldman, and was not originally a "house" either. Instead, the structure was a small commercial building with residential quarters on the second floor. Evidence of this commercial design include a side porch/loading dock facing the alley to the north (since removed); obvious stone in-filling of the first-floor shop-front windows; a large structural beam above the one-time shop front that supported the second-story stonework; photographic evidence from the 1940s of remnants of the original first-floor commercial cornice (see enlarged image below); physical evidence of a central entrance step into the shop; and wooden sleepers that served as nailers for decorative wooden pilasters or perhaps signs at either side of the shop windows below the cornice. Documentary evidence suggests that the stone portion of the building dates to the late fall of 1857, coinciding with the onset of the Panic of 1857. Another unexpected discovery is that parts of the wood-frame addition to the rear of the stone building actually predate the stone portion, making the latter the true "addition." The research is ongoing, and no doubt the Waldman House has more stories to tell.

The house was nominated to the National Register of Historic Places (NRHP) in 1983 as part of the West Seventh Street Early Limestone Houses Thematic Resource, along with the Joseph Brings House and Martin Weber House. The Waldman House received an NRHP reference number, #83004866, but the listing was never finalized. None of the three buildings are officially on the National Register. It was listed with listing code DR, meaning "Date Received" and nomination pending, in 1983.

== Before the Stone House: Wild Land Speculation ==
The Waldman House lies in the southwest block of Leech's Addition to the City of St. Paul (legally described as the NE1/4 of SE1/4 Section 1, Township 28, Range 23). Leech's Addition was platted by developer Samuel Leach in 1849 as a perfectly symmetric nine-block square of streets and alleys extending southwest from the earliest-settled core of St. Paul. Leech's Addition was bounded by Wilkin Street to the east, Douglas Street to the west, Ramsey Street to the north, and Goodrich Street to the south. Notably, Fort Road (today's West Seventh Street) ended at Ramsey Street and did not extend into Leech's Addition until 1859, after the stone portion of the Waldman House was built (more on this timing below). Before then, the historic thoroughfare to the Fort Snelling ferry and the Minnesota River valley beyond meandered along the Mississippi bluff line in unplatted land to the south of Goodrich Street, labeled on early maps as “Bluff Street.”

The lot occupied by the Waldman House was just paces away from Bluff Street. The lot spanned the area between block nine's alley to the north and Goodrich to the south, and faced Forbes Street (renamed Smith Avenue in 1887) to the east. Prior to 1853 this lot was bought and sold as an undifferentiated part of the quarter-section, and later block, by such early and avid land speculators as Henry Sibley, Samuel Leech, James McClellan Boal ("McBoal"), William Forbes and Justus Ramsey. The lot was first individually mentioned in a December 1853 deed when it was sold by Indian trader Louis Roberts along with eleven other lots to local investor William McCarty for $1,500. Eight months later McCarty more than doubled his money by selling six of these lots—-including the stone house lot—-to Toronto investor John Eastwood for $2,000. Eastwood immediately split up his purchase and sold the stone house lot by itself to A. Vance Brown one month later for $350, making a small profit on this parcel and perhaps larger profits on the remaining parcels. Four months later, by deed dated December 8, 1854, Brown then resold the lot to Charles Fuchs (aka Fox) for $420. Taking this single year of sales in total and adjusting for inflation, the value of the lot had increased more than 275% in the single year between Louis Roberts’ sale and Charles Fuchs' ultimate purchase.

== Charles Fuchs: Original Stone House Owner ==
It was during Fuchs' ownership that the stone portion of building at 445 Smith was constructed. Fuchs was a carpenter/contractor who emigrated from Wurttenburg, Germany in 1849. Fuchs married Sophia Daveneck in St. Louis, Missouri in May 1849 and moved to St. Paul with their son Charles in 1852. In March 1852 Fuchs purchased the lot at the southwest corner of Fort Road and Walnut Street, which he expanded by purchase of the northwest corner in June 1853, and the adjacent northwest corner of Walnut and Oak Street (now Smith Avenue N.) in November 1854. The $420 price paid by Fuchs for the stone house lot only one month later (December 1854) suggests there may already have been a small wood-frame structure there. Fuchs' stature as a contractor is shown by the fact that he was hired to build the Athenaeum in 1859, one of the most prominent public buildings in Uppertown at the time, and also by the $6,000 in real estate he had amassed by 1860—at a time when vacant lots in Uppertown could be acquired for as little as $300.

== A saloon ==
Fuchs' home was several blocks away at 148 Walnut Street and his business was based from Fort Road and Walnut, so it would appear that the stone house was an investment property. The question is, what was it used for? The Minnesota statehood census lists Edward and Sarah Shingles as residing on the lot in November 1857, and intriguingly, Edward's occupation is listed as "saloon." Both Shingles (aka Shindell and Shendle) and the building's owner after 1860, Anthony Waldman, paid the City of St. Paul for liquor licenses in March 1858. By May of that year Shingles is listed as the proprietor of the Winnebago Saloon on Jackson Street near St. Paul's lower levee (today's Lowertown), so if in fact Shingles operated an earlier saloon from the stone house it could not have been for long. Waldman, who purchased the stone house in October 1860, is listed as the owner of a lager beer saloon in the 1860 federal census. To add to the brewing connections, in October 1859 Waldman received a mortgage to the Stahlmann Cave Brewery (present-day Schmidt Brewery site) on West 7th Street as security for a $500 loan to Henry and Christoph Stahlmann, fellow Bavarians who were among St. Paul's earliest and most successful brewers. Notably, there were a growing number of German lager houses and saloons in the immediate vicinity of the stone house prior to the Civil War. Immediately across the alley to the north on Forbes, John Fetzer ran a lager beer saloon from 1856 to 1860, and the notorious “Cave House” saloon and brothel operated a few blocks further down Bluff Street. All of this points to a possible intended use of the stone building as a saloon, perhaps first by Shingles and then by Waldman.

== Panic of 1857 ==
If the Waldman "House" was in fact originally built for use as a saloon, the Panic of 1857 and shifting development patterns soon aborted this enterprise. St. Paul's early historian J. Fletcher Williams was an eye-witness to Minnesota's first economic crisis, which he described in his History of St. Paul first published in 1876:

Saint Paul was said by travelers, to be the fastest and liveliest town on the Mississippi River. Emigration was pouring in astonishingly, several boats landing daily loaded with passengers. Those intending to go back in the country, usually purchased their supplies here, and the stores were almost overtaxed, so profitable was their trade. The hotels and boarding houses were crowded to overflowing. The principal business streets fairly hummed with the rush of busy life. Building was never so brisk; an army of workman and mechanics labored night and day to keep up with the demand for dwellings and stores. That season they coined money.

On August 24, occurred the failure of the Ohio Life Insurance and Trust Company, of New York, which gave rise to the memorable panic or financial revulsion of that year. To St. Paul, this pricking of the bubble of speculation was more ruinous and dire in its consequences than perhaps to any other city in the west. Everything had been so inflated and unreal--values purely fictitious, all classes in debt, with but little real wealth, honest industry neglected, and everything speculative and feverish—-that the blow fell with ruinous force. Business was paralyzed, real estate actually valueless and unsaleable at any price, and but little good money in circulation. Ruin stared all classes in the face. The note secured by mortgages must be paid, but all values were destroyed. No device would raise money, for no one had any to lend. Everybody was struggling to save himself. The banking houses closed their doors—-nearly all the mercantile stores suspended or made assignments. All works of improvement ceased, and general gloom and despondency settled down on the community. In a few days, from the top waive of prosperity, it was plunged into the slough of despond.

And now the ‘hard times’ commenced in earnest. No description of this terrible and gloomy period will convey any idea of it. With many, even those who had but shortly before imagined themselves wealthy, there was a terrible struggle between pride and want. But few had saved anything, so generally had the reckless spirit of the times infected all classes. The humble poor, of course, suffered; but the keenest suffering was among those who experienced the fall from affluence to poverty. The papers were crowded for months with foreclosures of mortgages, executions, and other results of the crash. Not one in five of the business houses or firms weathered the storm, despite the most desperate struggles. The population of the City fell off almost 50 percent, and stores would scarcely rent at any price.”

== The Mystery of the Jacob Amos Store ==
After Shingles, Jacob Amos is listed as the next occupant of the stone house in the 1858-9 St. Paul City Directory (the content of which was compiled prior to May 1858). Amos was a stonemason from Hesse Darmstadt, Germany, where he was born in 1824. Amos and his sometime business partner Christian Rhinehardt constructed numerous other limestone structures in Uppertown, including 202 McBoal Street (Martin Webber House, 1867). Jacob and his wife Elizabeth were married in Franklin County in southeastern Indiana on April 19, 1852. Elizabeth (née Seidenthaler) was born in Ohio about 1834. They had two children in Indiana (Jacob, b. 1852; George, b. 1855) before moving to Minnesota Territory by 1856, where their first daughter (Louisa) was born in 1856. They had five more children in St. Paul (Rosina, 1858; Phillipp, 1862; Frank, 1865; Charles, 1866; Ida, 1874). The first record of Amos in St. Paul is his listing in the 1856/7 City Directory as a “mason” living on Bluff Street, two blocks south of the stone building.

Intriguingly, the 1858-9 City Directory describes the stone building where Amos and his family were living as a "store." This is the earliest documentary evidence (corroborating the clear architectural evidence) that the Waldman House was not always or solely a residence. However, the Directory makes no mention of what kind of store it was, and there is no cross-listing for any store at that location in the business section of the Directory. None of the state or federal censuses ever describe Amos' occupation as anything other than a stonemason. So, given the implausibility that Amos chose the worst economic crisis of the period to experiment in retail trade, one is compelled to conclude that the "store" description in the Directory may not be accurate. The Directory's use of the term may reflect nothing more than the compilers’ conjecture based on the building's obvious (former) storefront appearance. Moreover, given the chaotic economic times, it may have been difficult for the Directory's compilers to decipher the building's current use (especially if its owner declined to pay for a fuller listing). The building is listed as vacant in the federal census of 1860, and its ownership changed twice that year before being purchased by Waldman. While it is only a guess, it is possible that Amos was the stonemason for the stone addition to the wood-frame structure originally on the lot, and then occupied the building with his family after it fell vacant following the Panic—perhaps in lieu of Fuchs' payment for his work.

In February, 1862, shortly after occupying the stone house, Amos enlisted as a private in Company E, 5th Infantry Regiment Minnesota. He was promoted to the ranks of Sergeant (April 2, 1862), 1st Lieutenant (August 2, 1863) and Full Captain (February 9, 1865), before mustering out at Fort Snelling on September 6, 1865. As a member of the 5th Minnesota, Amos participated in the Siege of Corinth, Mississippi (May 26–30, 1862); the Battle of Corinth (October 3–4, 1862); Grant's central Mississippi campaign (November 1862-January, 1863); the Siege of Vicksburg (May 18-July 4, 1863); and the Battle of Nashville (December 15–16, 1864), among numerous other campaigns. After the war, the 1870 and 1880 censuses list Amos and his 9 other family members living in the same small, one-story house at 57 Banfil Street (the house remains today at 276 Banfil).

== Anthony Waldman: Conversion to a House ==
Following Amos, Anthony Waldman was the next occupant of the stone house. Waldman emigrated from Bavaria in 1853 and was in St. Paul by 1856. He first established himself in St. Paul as a successful woodmerchant, judging by a series of advertisements he placed for the sale of 200 cords of hardwood in the November 1857 Pioneer & Democrat (wood sold for between $5.00 and $6.50 per cord that year.) The following year (1858) Waldman was among the minority of St. Paul residents having sufficient wealth to be assessed for the city's personal property tax—in Waldman's case, on "30 cords wood." As noted above, Waldman's occupation is listed as "lager beer saloon" in the 1860 census—the same year he purchased the stone house. However, by 1864 the City Directories begin consistently listing his occupation as the owner of a “feed and flour” store, a trade Waldman continued for the next fifteen years. His store is variously listed at “3d n[ear] Eagle, Swain’s block” (1864 to 1866); “Seventh bet[ween] St. Anthony and Chestnut” (1867); “66 Fort [Road]” (1868 to 1873), and finally at “114 Fort [Road]” during Waldman's two year business partnership with George Eaton.

Waldman's feed and flour store is never listed at his stone house address. A mortgage taken out by Waldman in May 1863 probably coincides with alterations to the stone building to convert it to purely residential use and appearance. In particular, the commercial storefront windows on the first floor were filled with stonework and two smaller windows to match those on the second story above. Apparently by this time the stone house was no longer a viable location for a retail business.

== Stranded by Shifting Development Patterns ==
The reason for this is one of the most interesting aspects of the stone house's history. As mentioned above, the historic thoroughfare from St. Paul to the ferry at Fort Snelling ran along the Mississippi River bluff line, mostly through unplatted land west of the city. The developers of Leech's Addition effectively cut the City off from this causeway by interposing the Addition's rigid grid of north–south/east–west streets, which ran right through to the bluff line. Doubtless this was not a problem in the earliest years when streets only existed on paper. Nevertheless, in May 1857, at the urging of the St. Paul Common Council, the Territorial Legislature appointed five street commissioners, three of whom were St. Paul residents, to "lay out a public street and road from the present westerly termination of Fort Street [i.e. at Ramsey] in said City to the westerly limits of said City, and thence to the ferry landing opposite Fort Snelling, on the Mississippi River." The street commissioners began work that summer, causing a survey and plat of the new Fort Road extension to be made. Public notice of the plans were given in the newspapers and the plat was displayed at the Registrar's Office. It was the early autumn of 1857, just weeks before the sudden onslaught of the Panic. This is about the time Fuchs began building his stone commercial building on Forbes Street.

What does the Fort Road extension have to do with the stone house? It explains the most frequently asked question people ask when they are told that the Waldman "House" used to be a commercial building: "Why would anyone put a commercial building there, in the middle of a residential neighborhood?" While the survey and plat drawing for this original Fort Road extension plan have been lost, newspaper accounts and court records suggest that the commissioners’ initial survey and plat proposed to bring the Fort Road extension down Forbes Street (renamed Smith Avenue today) right past the Waldman House to the Mississippi bluff line, and then along Bluff Street/Old Fort Road to the Fort Snelling ferry. If that is correct, Fuchs knew what he was doing when he built his commercial building facing a street that he and other observant property owners expected to become a major business thoroughfare.

Fatefully, however, the route first proposed by the street commissioners met with suspicion and hostility. As the St. Paul Financial Real Estate and Railroad Advisor opined on September 5, 1857:

This Avenue was intended by its projectors and by the Legislature to be some atonement to the people of St. Paul for the narrow, crooked, tortuous, bewildering and labryrinthine mases of the city streets. Nature has anticipated it, and provided for it in a broad, smooth, level plateau, stretching uninterruptedly to Fort Snelling. But instead of running it straight on to its terminous, the engineers are twisting it and coiling it through hills and ravines, out of a direct course, for the accommodation of private interests. Now we object to this perversion of the purpose of this road. We protest against this sacrifice of the beauty and convenience of this Avenue to the interests of anyone who can pay for its diversion.

A. Vance Brown, who had sold the stone house lot to Fuchs in 1854, may have been among those suspected by the paper as exerting their influence. Brown was among the wealthiest real estate speculators of the day, and he owned several lots and commercial buildings along Bluff Street. There is no direct evidence linking Fuchs to the politics of the Fort Road extension. However, contemporaneous evidence shows he was not above pulling the levers of City government to improve the value of his properties. While no other street in Leech's Addition would be graded for another twenty years, in 1858 Fuchs and a handful of other owners along Forbes Street repeatedly petitioned the Common Council to grade Forbes and build a sidewalk on its west side, purportedly out of a concern that it was "impossible for school children to get to the School House from the upper part of the Town." Obviously unconvinced of their motives, Mayor Norman Kittson vetoed these improvements, stating that "the streets designated have as yet few buildings erected on them, and being situated on the outskirts of the populated parts of the City, must be for the convenience only of a few of the property owners."

Whether or not Fuchs himself was influential in bending the path of the Fort Road extension past his property, he was surely disappointed by what happened next. Apparently stung by what Judge Palmer called, in a report to the Ramsey County Commissioners, "many difficult and embarrassing questions," the 1858 State Legislature voided the 1857 Act appointing the original street commissioners. Also voided were the commissioners' first survey and plat. In their place the Legislature appointed a new set of commissioners, overseen by Judge Palmer, to "lay out and establish the said public street . . . on the most direct and practicable route." This is the route of the present-day West 7th Street, the grading of which was completed in 1859. Senator William Davern led the charge for the corrected straight-line plan of West 7th Street, which coincidentally was drawn to pass immediately adjacent to Davern's 80-acre (320,000 m^{2}) farm southwest of the city.

The result was the veritable stranding of Fuchs' commercial building in what became a predominantly residential area. From 1858 on, almost all commercial development in Uppertown converged along West 7th Street. This made inevitable the re-purposing of the Waldman House as residence—which likely occurred in 1863, shortly after Waldman's purchase. Fetzer's Saloon next door also closed and became the Fetzer family's residence. One can imagine Fuchs' reaction, long after selling his property, when the construction of the High Bridge in 1889 once again turned (now) Smith Avenue into a major thoroughfare.

== History still being written ==
Waldman increased his property holdings throughout the 1860s and 1870s, building two other residences immediately to the south on the same lot—the double house at 449-51 Smith (1871; razed 2009) and the larger Italianate Revival home at 457 Smith (1873). In 1885 Waldman sold his home and two rental properties on Forbes Street (now Smith Avenue), and returned to Germany, where he died in Edenkoben, Pfalz, Rheinbauein in 1887. A French-Canadian real estate investor named Thomas Manning purchased the stone house, and from there it went through several decades of renters. John Rafter, an Irish stone worker and later St. Paul policeman, his wife Margaret and their five children rented the stone house from approximately 1896 to 1917. Wellie Vierow, a German widow with her three adult children, rented the house beginning in 1917 and remained there throughout the 1920s. Ultimately the house was finally purchased by John and Francis Dreyling in 1947. John Dreyling died in 1988, and Francis lived alone in the house until 2008 when it was purchased for restoration by Tom and Ann Schroeder.

== Bottom line ==
Despite its outward residential appearance today, this building is the oldest surviving commercial structure in the City of St. Paul.
