= Amy Waldman =

American author and journalist (born 1969)

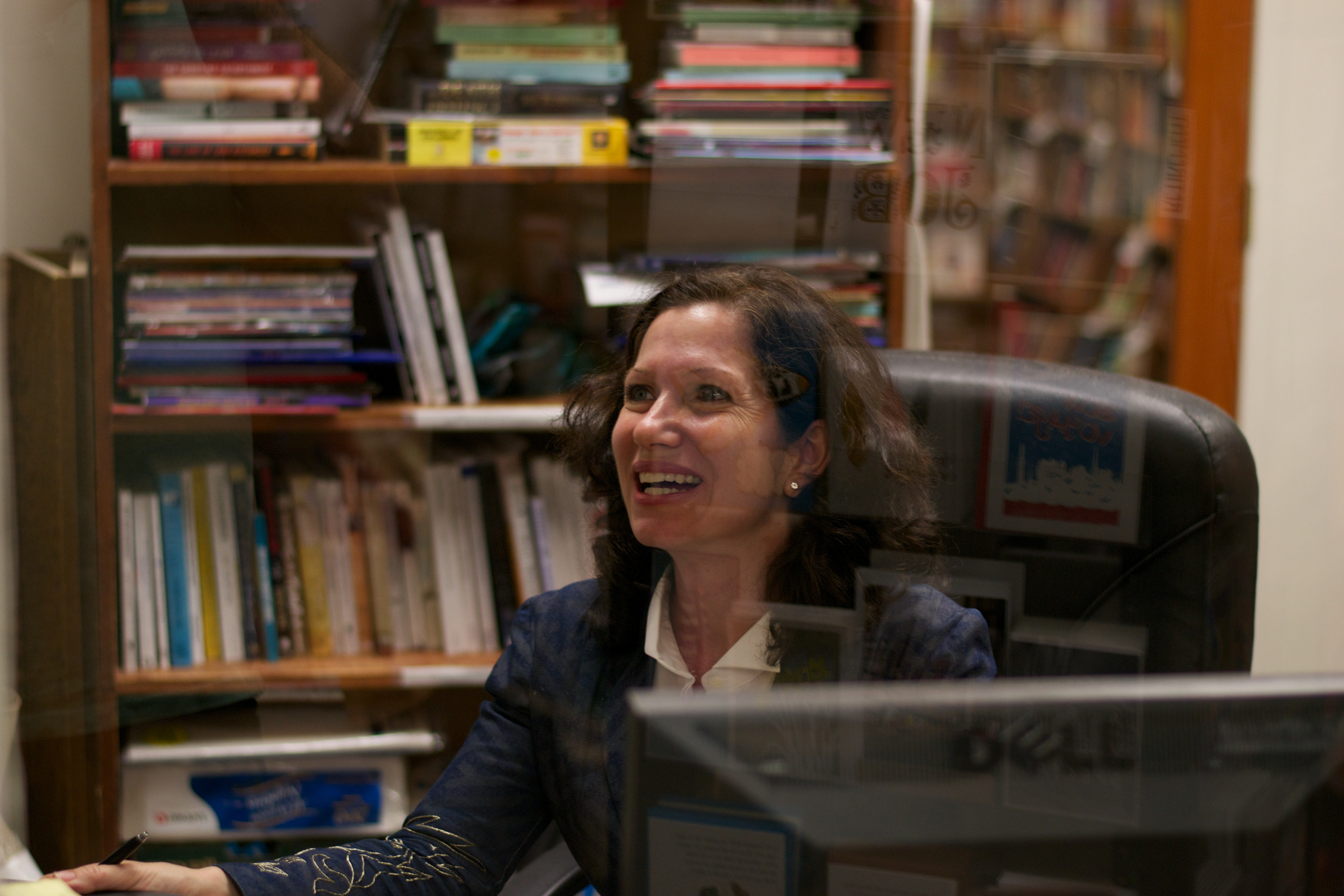
- Born: May 21, 1969 (age 57); Los Angeles, California, U.S.
- Occupations: Journalist, Writer
- Notable work: The Submission
- Mother: Marilyn Robinson Waldman
- Website: amywaldman.net

Amy Waldman (born May 21, 1969) is an American author and journalist. She was a reporter with The New York Times for a total of eight years. For three years she was co-chief of the South Asia bureau. Before that she covered Harlem, Brooklyn, the Bronx, and the aftermath of 9/11.

Her first novel, The Submission, was published in 2011. According to a review of the book in The Guardian, the novel tackles the fallout from 9/11 attacks. The novel was shortlisted for the Guardian First Book Award in 2011. It lost out narrowly to Siddhartha Mukherjee's The Emperor of All Maladies.

Waldman was also a national correspondent with The Atlantic, has been a fellow at the Radcliffe Institute for Advanced Study, is a contributing editor at the Washington Monthly, and won a Berlin Prize in 2010 from the American Academy in Berlin.

== The Submission ==
Amy Waldman's first novel, The Submission, was published in 2011 by Farrar, Straus and Giroux and received mostly positive reviews. The plot revolves around events after a terror attack, like that of the September 11 attacks, when an American Muslim architect wins a blind contest to design a memorial (like that of the Ground Zero Memorial). The novel explores themes of Islamophobia, personal and collective grief, art and memorialisation, and bureaucratic process.

Some of the awards and honors received include:

- Entertainment Weekly's Favorite Novel of 2011
- Esquire's 2011 Book of the Year
- A New York Times Notable Book for 2011
- A Washington Post Notable Fiction Book for 2011
- One of NPR's 10 Best Novels of 2011
- Amazon Best Books of the Month, August 2011

== A Door in the Earth ==
Waldman's second novel, A Door in the Earth, was published in 2019 by Little, Brown and Company. The novel focusses on a young college graduate who was born in Kabul and grew up in California. Inspired by the memoir by an American doctor who built a local women's clinic in rural Afghanistan, she decides to visit that same remote village to make use of her language skills and studies in anthropology in order to give further support to the project. While living with a local family she gradually realizes the falsehoods contained in the memoir while also coming to understand the power structures in the village and the influence of the U.S. Army on the region. Waldman depicts not only the people and customs of Afghanistan – which she herself experienced first-hand in 2001 as a journalist for the New York Times – but also the growing self-awareness of her protagonist against a backdrop of a village caught between Afghani resistance fighters and an American military unit determined to expand its influence over the region.

The library book review journal Kirkus Reviews described the novel as "A bone-chilling takedown of America's misguided use of soft power." The reviewer for The New York Times pointed out problems in the narrative voice, but noted that "it's easy to overlook these flaws because the book's moral questions feel so urgent."
