= Ruiner (A Wilhelm Scream album) =

Studio album by A Wilhelm Scream
- Released: August 16, 2005
- Recorded: February 2005
- Studios: The Blasting Room, Fort Collins, Colorado
- Genres: Melodic hardcore, punk rock, math rock, melodic emocore
- Length: 36:08
- Label: Nitro Records
- Producers: Bill Stevenson, Jason Livermore

A Wilhelm Scream chronology
| Mute Print (2004) | Ruiner (2005) | Career Suicide (2007) |

Ruiner, released on August 16, 2005 through Nitro Records, is the fourth full-length album from the Massachusetts-based melodic hardcore band A Wilhelm Scream, and their second album since changing their name from Smackin' Isaiah in 2002. It received mostly very favourable reviews.

== Background and recording ==
In September 2004, the band said they were in the planning stages for their next album. Two months later, they began pre-production for it. In January 2005, the band went on a brief north east US tour with Rise Against, Most Precious Blood and the Explosion. They recorded it at The Blasting Room in Fort Collins, Colorado in February 2005.

== Composition ==
In an interview with Racket Magazine, whilst on the tour of which the Australian tour edition was released, now ex-guitarist Christopher Levesque confirmed that the other guitarist, Trevor Reilly, sings the song "In Vino Veritas II". It was also revealed in the same interview that Bill Stevenson also participated with vocals and that Levesque did the piano parts in the song.

== Release ==
A Wilhelm Scream appeared at The Bamboozle festival in April 2005, and played a few shows with BoySetsFire. Following this, they toured the US with the Lawrence Arms and the Methadones. On June 17, 2005, Ruiner was announced for release in two months' time; alongside this, its track listing was posted online. Five days later, the album's artwork and "Killing It" were posted online. A Wilhelm Scream supported Lost City Angels for a handful of shows in July 2005, leading up to a two-week appearance on that year's Warped Tour. On August 12, 2005, the music video for "The Soft Sell" was posted online. Ruiner was released on August 16, 2005, through Nitro Records, which was promoted with a US tour with Catch 22 and Whole Wheat Bread running into September 2005. Following this, they appeared at a Nitro Records showcase at CMJ Music Marathon, supported Pennywise for the rest of September 2005, and supported Strung Out for a handful of shows in October 2005. They went on a US tour with Alexisonfire, the Receiving End of Sirens and Idiot Pilot. They closed out the year appearing at the KTCL-run Not So Silent Night festival, and played shows with the Blackout Pact.

In January 2006, they embarked on a tour of Europe with Lagwagon. Following this, they supported Less Than Jake on their headlining US tour until March 2006. Around this time, the band released two outtakes from the sessions – "Diver" and "They Like Their Turtlenecks Ribbed" – on 7" vinyl. On February 7, 2006, the band announced that bassist Curtis Lopez left, stating that he "took off on a plane today for some reason so he's outta here"; they appeared at the Groezrock festival in April 2006. Nick Deiner of the Swellers, who "quit college to do this tour", temporarily filled in for the rest of the shows. After the trek concluded, A Wilhelm Scream held auditions for a full-time replacement. In April 2006, the band toured across Canada supporting Protest the Hero; former the Fullblast bassist Brian Robinson joined A Wilhem Scream for this trek. In July and August 2006, they toured the US supporting Lagwagon. Following this, the supported Rise Against on their headlining European tour until September 2006. A Wilhelm Scream then toured across Australia with Less Than Jake. Coinciding with this, Australia-based Shock Records released a tour edition of the album, which included the outtake "Bodies and Suitcases" as a bonus track.

== Reception ==
Professional ratings
Review scores
| Source | Rating |
|---|---|
| Allmusic | 4/5 stars |
| Alternative Press | (5/5) |
| Sputnikmusic | (3.5/5) |

Punknews.org ranked the album at number three on their list of the year's 20 best releases.

== Track listing ==
All lyrics are written by Trevor Reilly, except where noted; all music is composed by A Wilhelm Scream.

| No. | Title | Length |
|---|---|---|
| 1. | "The King is Dead" | 3:24 |
| 2. | "Killing It" (Nuno Pereira, Reilly) | 2:29 |
| 3. | "The Pool" | 2:30 |
| 4. | "The Soft Sell" | 2:30 |
| 5. | "God Loves a Liar" | 2:23 |
| 6. | "In Vino Veritas II" | 2:25 |
| 7. | "Me vs. Morrissey in the Pretentiousness Contest (The Ladder Match)" | 1:45 |
| 8. | "Congratulations" | 1:29 |
| 9. | "The Kids Can Eat a Bag of Dicks" | 3:44 |
| 10. | "When I Was Alive: Walden III" | 2:19 |
| 11. | "Mercy Day for Mr. Vengeance" | 2:56 |
| 12. | "Less Bright Eyes, More Deicide" | 2:15 |
| 13. | "Speed of Dark" | 3:04 |
| 14. | "Cancer Dream" | 3:01 |
| Total length: | | 36:08 |

Australian tour edition
| No. | Title | Length |
|---|---|---|
| 15. | "Bodies as Suitcases" | 2:05 |
| Total length: | | 38:13 |

== Personnel ==
A Wilhelm Scream

- Nuno Pereira - vocals
- Trevor Reilly - guitar, backing vocals, art direction, lead guitar on “The King is Dead”, lead vocals on "In Vino Veritas II".
- Christopher Levesque - guitar, piano
- Jonathan Teves - bass, backing vocals
- Nicholas Pasquale Angelini - drums

Studio personnel

- Bill Stevenson - production, engineering, mixing, additional vocals
- Jason Livermore - production, engineering, mixing
- Andrew Berlin - additional engineering
- Brian Kephart - additional engineering
- Gene Grimaldi - mastering

Additional personnel

- Rob Dobi - artwork and illustrations

== Release history ==
| Region | Date | Label | Format | Catalog # | Ref. |
|---|---|---|---|---|---|
| United States | August 16, 2005 | Nitro Records | CD (digipak) | 15866 | |
| Japan | September 7, 2005 | Nitro Records | CD (digipak) | XTCK-29 | |
| United States | October 4, 2005 | Nitro Records | 12" vinyl | 15867 | |
| Australia | October 9, 2006 | Shock Records | CD (digipak) | CTX317CD | |

== Details ==
- Recording studio: The Blasting Room in Fort Collins, Colorado
- Mastering studio: Oasis Mastering in Burbank, California
