= Ken Waldman =

American writer and musician

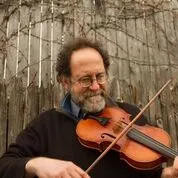
Poet and musician Ken Waldman with his fiddle.

Ken Waldman is an American writer and musician in Anchorage, Alaska who has published twenty books including 16 volumes of poetry, a book of acrostic poems for kids, a memoir, a creative writing handbook, and a novel. More than four hundred of his poems have been published in Beloit Poetry Journal, Manoa, Puerto del Sol, Quarterly West, South Dakota Review, Yankee and elsewhere. His short stories have appeared in Gargoyle, Laurel Review, The MacGuffin, and other journals. Ken's work has been nominated for the Pushcart Prize in both poetry and fiction.

Waldman also plays old-time Appalachian fiddle, clawhammer banjo and mandolin on his nine albums of original Appalachian-style music, traditional tunes, and poetry. He survived a small plane crash near Nome, Alaska in 1996; since then he has been a full-time touring artist. Ken Waldman's musical shows frequently feature the folksinger Willi Carlisle.

== Bibliography ==
List of Publications

Poetry:

- Nome Poems
- To Live on this Earth
- And Shadow Remained
- Conditions and Cures
- The Secret Visitor's Guide
- As the World Burns - The Sonnets of George W. Bush
- Sports Page
- Leftovers and Gravy
- D is for Dog Team - Alaska acrostic poems for kids
- Trump Sonnets Volume 1 - The First 50 Days
- Trump Sonnets Volume 2 - 33 Commentaries, 33 Dreams
- Trump Sonnets Volume 3 - The International Edition
- Trump Sonnets Volume 4 - The Shrunken Soul Edition
- Trump Sonnets Volume 5 - His Early Virus Monologues
- Trump Sonnets Volume 6 - His Middle Virus Soliloquy
- Trump Sonnets Volume 7 - His Further Virus Monologues
- Trump Sonnets Volume 8 - The Final Four Months

Prose:

- Are you Famous? Touring America with Alaska's Fiddling Poet
- The Writing Party
- Now Entering Alaska Time

Music:

- All Originals, All Traditionals
- 55 Tunes, 5 Poems
- Burnt Down House
- A Week in Eek
- Music Party
- Fiddling Poets on Parade
- Some Favorites
- D is for Dog Team (Book Companion)
- As the World Burns (Book Companion)
