= A Wilhelm Scream (EP) =

EP by A Wilhelm Scream
- Released: November 10, 2009
- Recorded: May–June 2009
- Studio: Black & Blue, New Bedford, Massachusetts
- Genre: Melodic hardcore, punk rock
- Length: 17:02
- Label: Paper + Plastick
- Producer: A Wilhelm Scream

A Wilhelm Scream chronology
Career Suicide (2007)	A Wilhelm Scream (2009)	Partycrasher (2013)

Professional ratings
Review scores
Source	Rating
Alternative Press	4.5/5 stars
Metal Temple	(unrated)
Scene Point Blank	8.6/10

A Wilhelm Scream, released on November 20, 2009 through Paper + Plastick, is the second EP and in all the fifth release from the Massachusetts-based melodic hardcore band A Wilhelm Scream since changing their name from Smackin' Isaiah in 2002. It is the follow-up to their critically acclaimed third full-length album Career Suicide and has thus far received very favourable reviews.

The EP marked the debut of guitarist Mike Supina, who replaced longtime member Chris Levesque and took over lead guitar duties from Trevor Reilly (though Reilly continues to play all leads and solos on songs written before the EP).

== Recording and composition ==
It was revealed in a July 2009 press release, featuring a partial interview with bassist Brian Robinson, that the band recorded this project themselves and it was therefore produced and recorded at their very own Black & Blue Studios in New Bedford, Massachusetts. "The reason for this long break from touring is because we took a crack at recording ourselves", is what Robinson informed. "This five song EP is an eclectic mix of all the avenues the band have gone down since Mute Print–and we’ll be throwing them into the sets on these upcoming tours", Robinson continued.

In an interview featured in an article published on Revolver's website, Reilly explained the lyrical meaning behind a song from the EP; "Bulletproof Tiger":

"The song was originally inspired by an incident that occurred in my neighborhood years back when a teenage boy murdered his mom in the middle of the afternoon with a kitchen knife. As I was writing and researching, it morphed into a story about a family member fighting his demons and drug addiction, told from his perspective with hopefully a look up to the future with determined eyes".

In collaboration with A Wilhelm Scream and Paper + Plastick, the magazine exclusively pre-released the mentioned song in the same article as mentioned earlier.

== Release ==
This is the band's first release since their signing with Paper + Plastick in June, 2009. They departed with Nitro Records in relation to its slowly progressing demise and the bands contract with the label being fulfilled. The original intent was to release the EP in Paper + Plastick's typical fashion, only making it available for sale as a 12" vinyl with a die cut gatefold jacket and digital download through the label's website. However, on its release date it was made available digitally and for physical sale as a tour edition digipak CD, not as a vinyl. Paper + Plastick has later stated that a 12" vinyl version, featuring three additional tracks, will be released early in the new year.

In August and September 2009, they went on a European tour, which included an appearance the Reading and Leeds Festivals. Following this, they toured the US until October 2009, leading up to a performance at The Fest On November 10, 2009, Punknews.org announced that the EP was available for tease preview streaming and purchase through the iTunes Store, ten days before its original release date.

The release is known to have been released by Shock Entertainment in Australia and Playfalse Records in Greece, both in conjunction with Paper + Plastick. Shock Records, A Wilhelm Scream's Australian label, released the EP on CD in a digipak on November 20, the same date is the EP released in the United States. The Australian edition features an additional bonus track; a cover of The Outfield's "Your Love". A music video was released for "Fun Time" on December 18, 2009. On January 7, 2010, the band performed "Skid Rock" on the TV show Talk Show Night at Juicebox Manor. In March 2010, they appeared at Harvest of Hope Fest and went on a short Canadian tour with Outbreak. The following month, A Wilhelm Scream performed at the Groezrock festival in Belgium and then embarked on a European tour with Pennywise and Strike Anywhere. A music video was released for "Australias" on July 6, 2010. They went on a cross-country Canadian tour throughout September 2010; a majority of the shows featured Comeback Kid and Madball.

== Track listing ==
All lyrics are written by Trevor Reilly, with the exception of No. 2 by Nuno Pereira and Reilly; all music is composed by A Wilhelm Scream.

No.	Title	Length
1.	"Australias"	2:47
2.	"Every Great Story Has a Shower Scene"	1:56
3.	"Fun Time"	4:00
4.	"Bulletproof Tiger"	3:49
5.	"Skid Rock"	4:30
Total length:		17:02

Australian edition
No.	Title	Length
6.	"Your Love" (The Outfield cover)	3:28
Total length:		20:30

== Personnel ==
A Wilhelm Scream

- Nuno Pereira – vocals, production, recording
- Trevor Reilly – guitar, backing vocals, production, recording, engineering
- Mike Supina – lead guitar, production, recording, engineering
- Brian J. Robinson – bass, backing vocals, production, recording
- Nicholas Pasquale Angelini – drums, production, recording

Studio personnel

- James Whitten – engineering
- Matt Bayles – mixing
- Nick Zampiello – mastering

Additional personnel

- Derek Deal – artwork and illustrations

== Release history ==
Region	Date	Label	Format	Catalog #	Ref.
Worldwide	November 10, 2009	Paper + Plastick	digital	—	
United States	November 20, 2009	Paper + Plastick	CD (digipak)	—	
Australia	November 20, 2009	Shock Entertainment*	CD (digipak)	CTX536CD	
Greece	November 20, 2009	Playfalse Records*	CD (digipak)	—	
Austria; Belgium; Germany; Luxembourg; Netherlands; Switzerland	December 18, 2009	Ass-Card Records	CD (digipak)	ACR028	
United States	January/February 2010	Paper + Plastick	12" vinyl	—	—
"—" denotes unknown or non-existent information. "*" denotes release in conjunction with Paper + Plastick.

== Details ==
- Recording studio: Black & Blue, New Bedford, Massachusetts
- Mastering studio: New Alliance East, Cambridge, Massachusetts
