= Walden Township, Minnesota =

Walden Township is the name of some places in the U.S. state of Minnesota:

- Walden Township, Cass County, Minnesota
- Walden Township, Pope County, Minnesota
