= Waldmann =

Waldmann is a German surname meaning "forest man". Notable people with the surname include:

- Hans Waldmann (mayor) (1435–1489), mayor of Zurich and Swiss military leader
- Hans Waldmann (fighter pilot) (1922–1945), German former Luftwaffe fighter ace
- Herman Waldmann (born 1945), British immunologist
- Ludwig Waldmann (1913–1980), German physicist
- Ralf Waldmann (1966–2018), Grand Prix motorcycle road racer

== See also ==
- Waldman
