= Waldner =

Waldner is surname of:

- Benita Ferrero-Waldner (born 1948), Austrian diplomat and politician
- Erwin Waldner (1933–2015), German footballer
- Gabi Waldner (born 1969), Austrian journalist
- Georg Friedrich Sylvius Waldner, known as Alexius von Speyer (1583–1629)
- Henriette Louise Waldner de Freundstein (Freunstein), Baronne d'Oberkirch (1754, Schweighouse, Alsace - 1803)
- Jan-Ove Waldner (born 1965, Stockholm), Swedish table tennis player
- Jean-Baptiste Waldner (born 1959), French engineer, management consultant and author
- Konrad Waldner (13/14th century), Bishop of Brixen
- Liz Waldner (born ?), American poet
- Sally Bould Stan (née Sally Waldner; 1917–2008), American architect in California
- Teodoro Waldner (1927–2014), Argentine Air Force commander
- Walter Waldner (1929–2008), an Austrian sprint canoer
