= Partycrasher =

Studio album by A Wilhelm Scream
- Released: November 5, 2013
- Recorded: 2012
- Studio: The Blasting Room, Fort Collins, Colorado
- Genre: Punk rock, melodic hardcore
- Length: 34:13
- Label: No Idea Records

A Wilhelm Scream chronology
A Wilhelm Scream (2009)	Partycrasher (2013)	Lose Your Delusion (2022)

Professional ratings
Review scores
Source	Rating
Under The Gun	9/10 stars
Alternative Press	4/5 stars
Punknews.org	4/5 stars

Partycrasher, released on November 5, 2013, through No Idea Records, is the fourth full-length album from the Massachusetts based melodic hardcore band A Wilhelm Scream, since changing their name from Smackin' Isaiah, and their sixth overall. It is their first full-length release following 2007's Career Suicide. Recorded in 2012, Produced and Engineered by Trevor J. Reilly and Mike Supina at Black and Blue Studio, and Anchor End Recording, both in New Bedford MA. Additional Engineering by James Whitten. Mixing done by Andrew Berlin and the crew at The Blasting Room.

The album is widely considered to be the heaviest of all of A Wilhelm Scream's releases and features the band using more heavy metal elements than their previous releases.

A remastered version of the album was released in 2024. The remastered version features acoustic demos of The Last Laugh and Devil Don't Know, along with a previously unreleased track called Swallow The Sea.

== Track listing ==
No.	Title	Length
1.	"Boat Builders"	3:50
2.	"The Last Laugh"	3:02
3.	"Devil Don't Know"	2:43
4.	"Number One"	3:03
5.	"Gut Sick Companion"	2:04
6.	"Hairy Scarecrow"	3:23
7.	"Ice Man Left a Trail"	3:11
8.	"Sassaquin"	3:33
9.	"Walkin' with Michael Douglas"	3:25
10.	"Wild Turkey"	2:40
11.	"Born a Wise Man"	3:19

== Personnel ==
A Wilhelm Scream

- Nuno Pereira – vocals
- Trevor Reilly – guitar, backing vocals
- Mike Supina – lead guitar, backing vocals
- Brian J. Robinson – bass guitar, backing vocals
- Nicholas Pasquale Angelini – drums
