= Mute Print =

Studio album by A Wilhelm Scream
- Released: April 20, 2004
- Recorded: March–June 2003
- Studios: The Blasting Room, Fort Collins, CO
- Genres: Melodic hardcore, punk rock
- Length: 32:50
- Label: Nitro Records
- Producers: Bill Stevenson, Jason Livermore

A Wilhelm Scream chronology
Benefits Of Thinking Out Loud (2002)	Mute Print (2004)	Ruiner (2005)

Professional ratings
Review scores
Source	Rating
Punknews.org	4/5 stars

Mute Print, released on April 20, 2004 through Nitro Records, is the third full-length album from the Massachusetts based melodic hardcore band A Wilhelm Scream. It is their first studio album since changing their name from Smackin' Isaiah in 2002.

== Background and production ==
This album is the follow-up to a release that was done under their old name, Smackin' Isaiah, entitled Benefits Of Thinking Out Loud. In March 2003, the band began recording their next album at The Blasting Room in Fort Collins, Colorado. On March 22, 2003, the band changed their name to A Wilhelm Scream. The following month, the band toured across Canada with Near Miss. The band finished recording the album in June 2003.

== Release ==
On June 26, 2003, Mute Print was announced for release in September, through Jump Start Records. During September, the album was pushed back; the band embarked on a tour across the US, which ran into November. In January 2004, the band signed to Nitro Records. In February and March 2004, the band toured across the US with Much the Same, Break the Silence, and Near Miss. Mute Print was eventually released on April 20, 2004.

The music video for "Mute Print" was posted online on May 22, 2004. That same month, the band went on a US tour with Near Miss until June 2004; they played a handful of shows with the Full Blast, prior to four shows as part of that year's Warped Tour. In August/early September, The Vinyl Collective Cooperative Label released a vinyl version of Mute Print. In August and September 2004, the band supported Killradio on their headlining US tour. In October 2004, they played at a CMJ showcase, followed by a brief tour with Love Me Destroyer. A music video for "Famous Friends and Fashion Drunks" was posted on the label's website on October 8, 2004. They went on an East Coast tour with Love Me Destroyer in November 2004, and then a West Coast tour with Strung Out, Only Crime and Haste the Day to close out the year.

== Track listing ==
Lyrics by Trevor Reilly, with the exception of #8 by Nuno Pereira. Music by A Wilhelm Scream.

No.	Title	Length
1.	"Mute Print"	1:15
2.	"Famous Friends and Fashion Drunks"	2:24
3.	"Anchor End"	2:46
4.	"William Blake Overdrive"	3:06
5.	"Brand New Me, Same Shitty You"	3:11
6.	"The Rip"	3:16
7.	"Retiring"	2:10
8.	"Stab. Stab. Stab."	3:46
9.	"A Picture of the World"	3:56
10.	"Kursk"	3:33
11.	"Dreaming of Throwing Up"	3:31
12.	"Mute Print (video)" (Japanese edition only)	1:15

== Personnel ==
- Nuno Pereira – vocals
- Trevor Reilly – guitar, backing vocals
- Christopher Levesque – guitar
- Jonathan Teves – bass, backing vocals
- Nicholas Pasquale Angelini – drums

== Production ==
- Produced, engineered and mixed by Bill Stevenson and Jason Livermore
- Recorded at The Blasting Room, Fort Collins, CO
- Mastered by Alan Douches at West West Side Music
