= Steve Waldman =

American economist (born 1970)

Steve Randy Waldman
- Born: 1970 (age 55–56)

Academic background
- Education: New College of Florida, University of Kentucky

Academic work
- Discipline: Cultural economics
- School or tradition: Danish Libertarian
- Website: http://interfluidity.com

Steve Randy Waldman (born 1970) is an American computer programmer and writer known for his commentary on contemporary economics at his blog Interfluidity. Educated at the New College of Florida, and University of Kentucky, Waldman is a Java programmer and wrote the c3p0 tool. He is most well known for his economics posts at Interfluidity, which have been cited by Paul Krugman, Tyler Cowen, Simon Wren-Lewis, The Economist, CNBC, the National Review, Nicholas Gruen, Justin Fox of Time magazine, and Matt Levine. Waldman supports a basic income (or other ways to provide a strong social safety net) and otherwise describes himself as "Danish libertarian".

Waldman is known for his criticism of financial regulation: James Kwak quotes "An enduring truth about financial regulation is this: Given the discretion to do so, financial regulators will always do the wrong thing." Paul Krugman of the New York Times often cites Waldman; he talks about him 'going medieval' on Ezra Klein, and another time: "we are indeed, as Steve Randy Waldman says, all dorks".

The writer and novelist Adelle Waldman is Waldman's sister. His mother, Jacqueline Waldman, was a chemistry professor at Goucher College.
