= Walden Ponds Wildlife Habitat =

Protected area in Boulder County, Colorado, USA

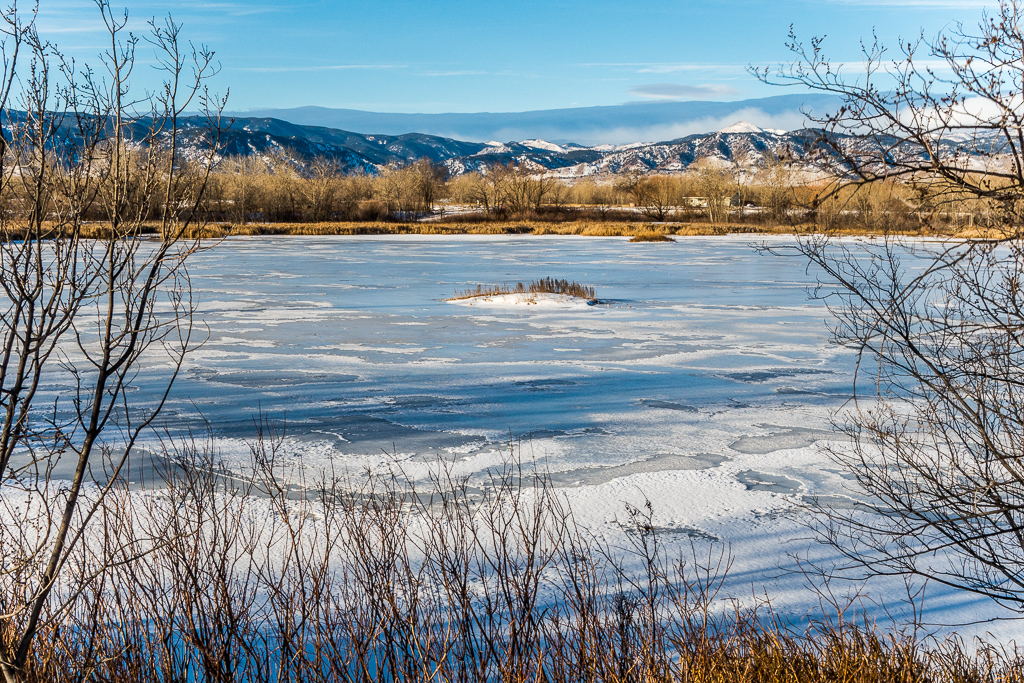
- Walden Ponds in winter
- Interactive map of Walden Ponds Wildlife Habitat
- Location: Boulder County, Colorado
- Nearest city: Boulder
- Coordinates: 40.0441°N 105.1879°W
- Area: 102 acres (41 ha)
- Established: 1974
- Website: bouldercounty.gov/open-space/parks-and-trails/walden-ponds-wildlife-habitat/

Walden Ponds Wildlife Habitat is a 102-acre (41 ha) Boulder County, Colorado park. It was reclaimed between 1974 and the 1990s from an open-pit gravel mine on the site, and is named after Walden "Wally" Toevs, the Boulder County commissioner who spearheaded the plan to convert the gravel pits into a wildlife habitat.

After the mining ceased and the property had been stripped 15 feet (4.6 m) down to bedrock, all that was left were open pits and puddles of ground water.

The park has several ponds and marshlands, hiking trails, picnic facilities, restrooms, and fishing. It claims to be one of the best bird-watching areas in Boulder County.

The Walden Ponds area is west of 75th St., south of Jay Rd. and north of Valmont Rd. The adjacent Sawhill Ponds open space property to the south is owned by Colorado Parks & Wildlife (CPW) but managed by the City of Boulder Open Space and Mountain Parks Department (Boulder OSMP). Trails connect in a few places.

Although under different ownership and management, various entities treat the two as a single unit. The popular eBird birding app shows 300 species observed within the combined area.

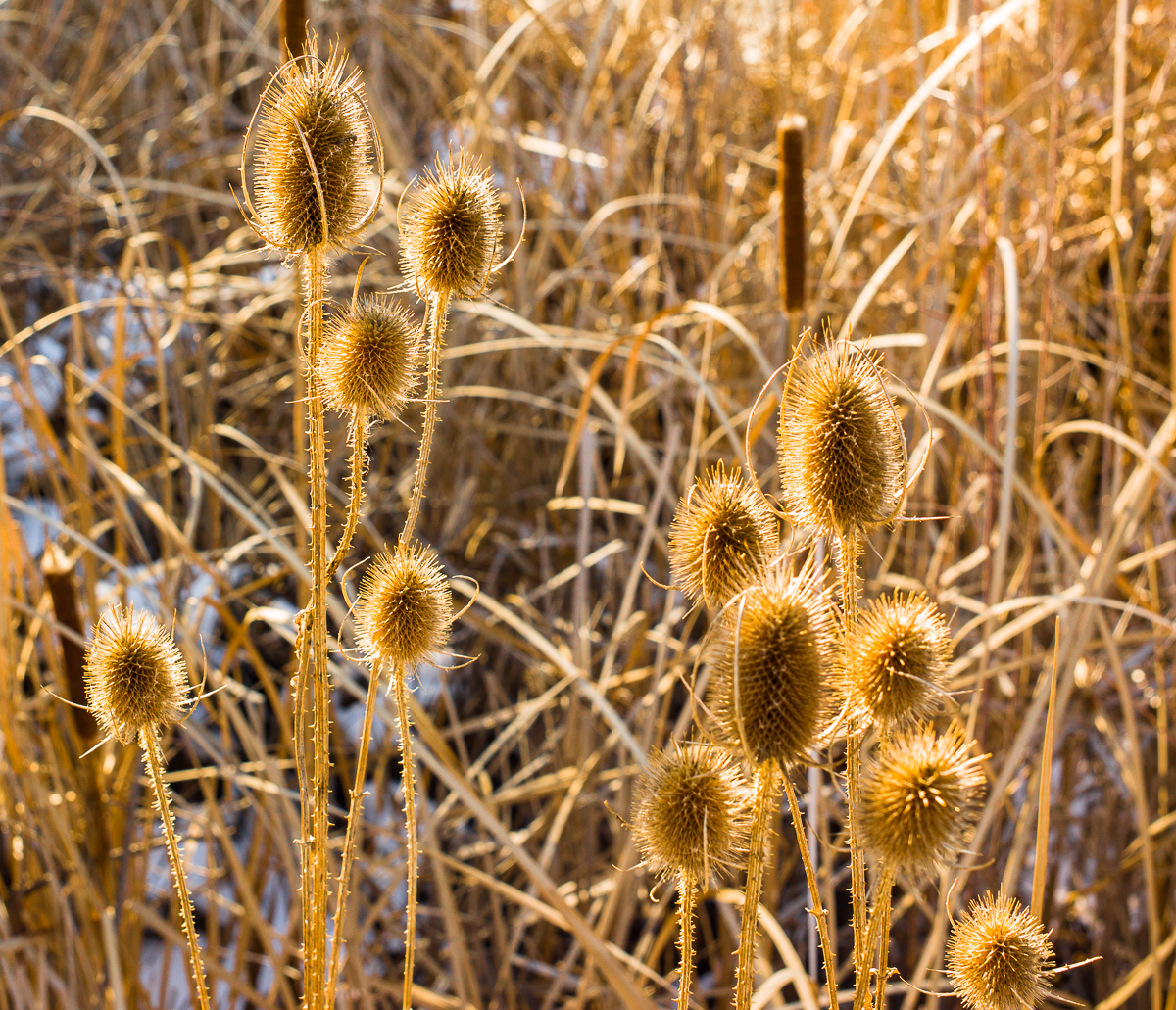
Along the boardwalk at Walden Ponds.

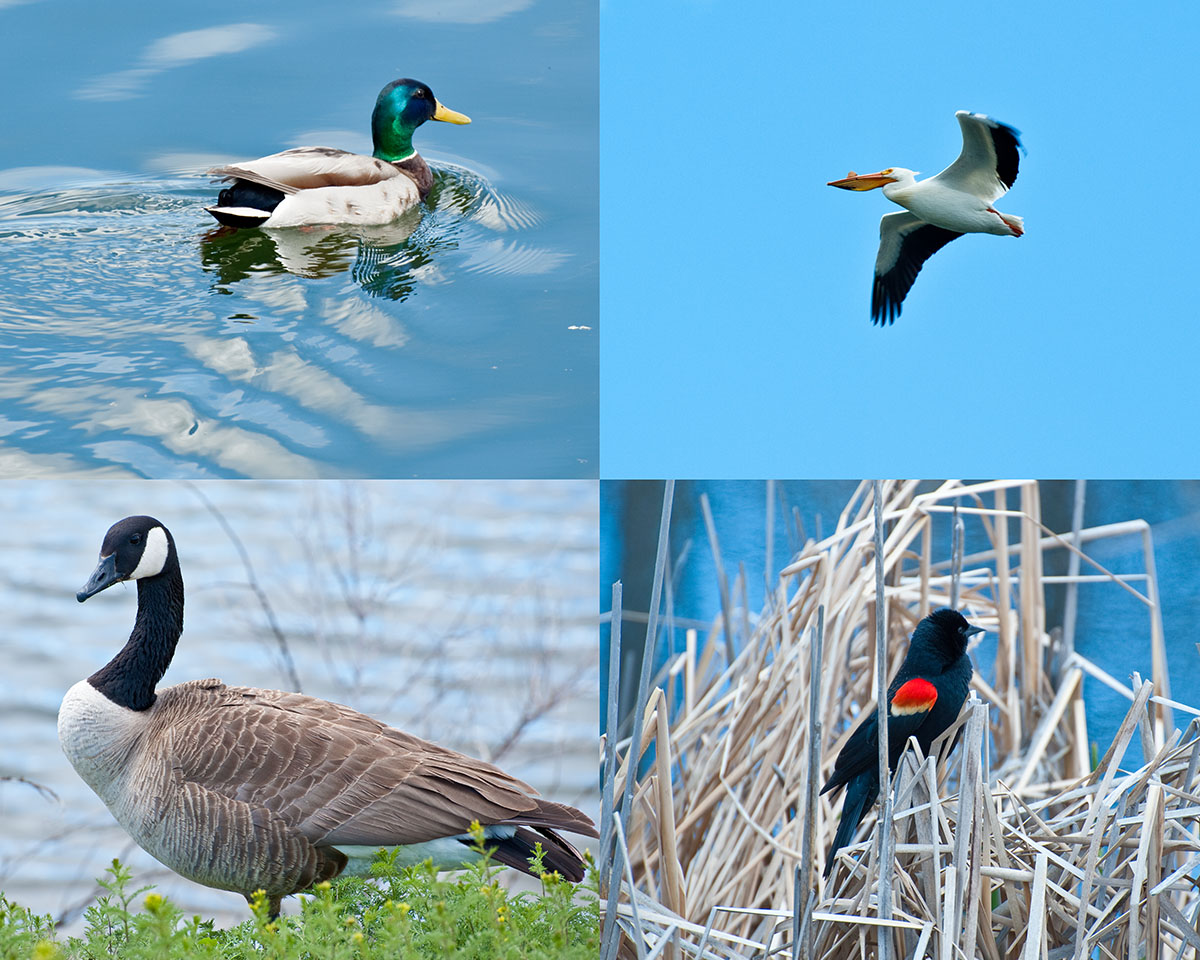
Birds at Walden Ponds.
