= Waldo Waldman =

American author and leadership consultant

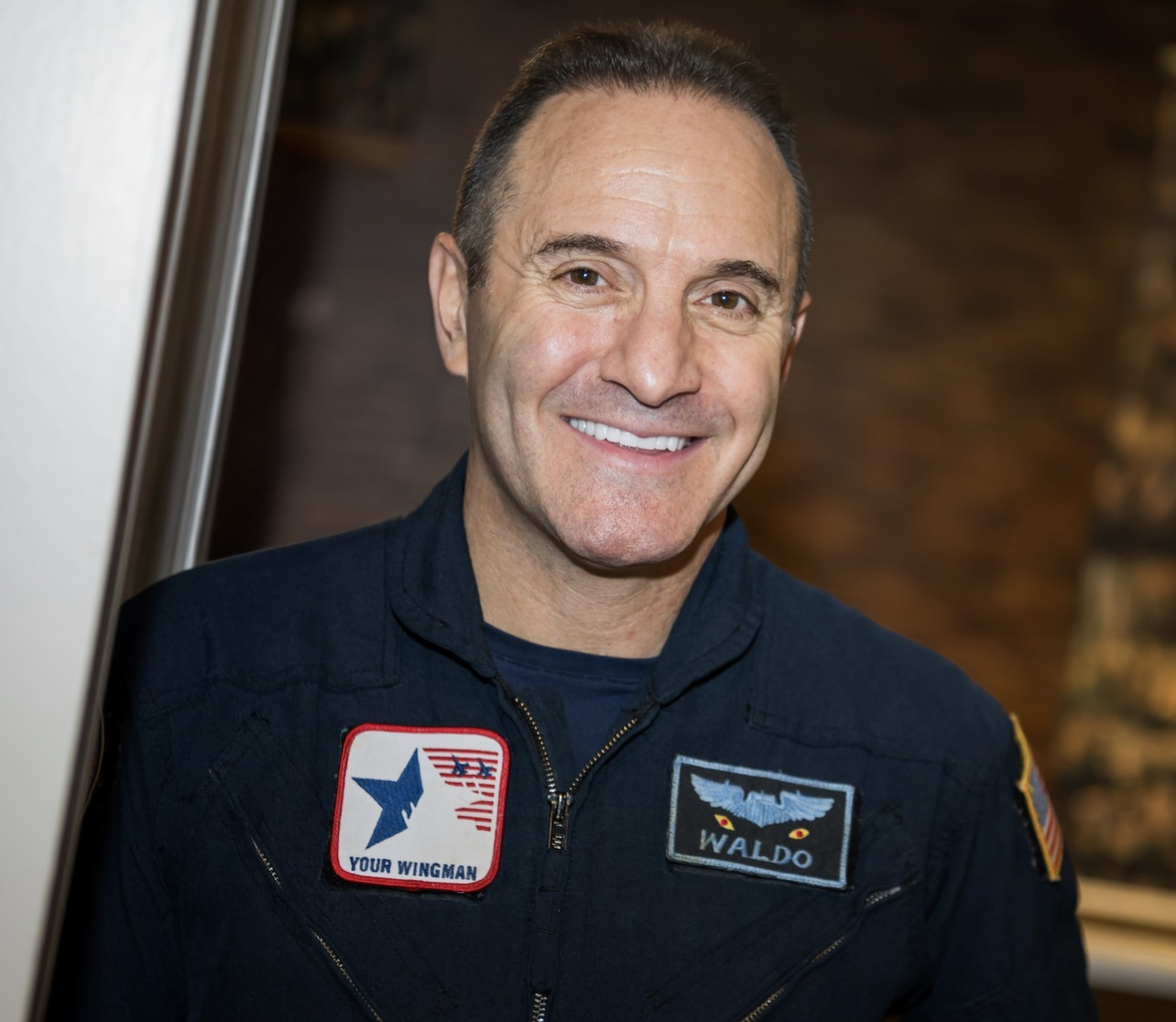
- Born: Rob Waldman; Long Island, New York, U.S.
- Other names: Lt. Col. (ret.) Rob ‘Waldo’ Waldman; The Wingman
- Education: M.B.A.
- Known for: Former F-16 Fighter Pilot; Author; Motivational Speaker
- Notable work: Book: Never Fly Solo
- Website: yourwingman.com

Waldo Waldman (Lt. Col. Rob 'Waldo' Waldman) is an American author, motivational speaker and leadership consultant, and founder of The Wingman Foundation. He is a decorated fighter pilot and retired Air Force Lt. Col. and combat veteran, having flown 65 combat missions. He is the author of Never Fly Solo, a New York Times and Wall Street Journal bestseller. He has won multiple awards during his military and speaking career, including being inducted into the Speaker Hall of Fame by the National Speakers Association.

== Early life ==
Waldman was born and raised in Long Island. His father was a Navy veteran and mechanic at John F. Kennedy International Airport where Waldman would often accompany him. It was at an early age that he decided he wanted to fly planes.

== Military career ==
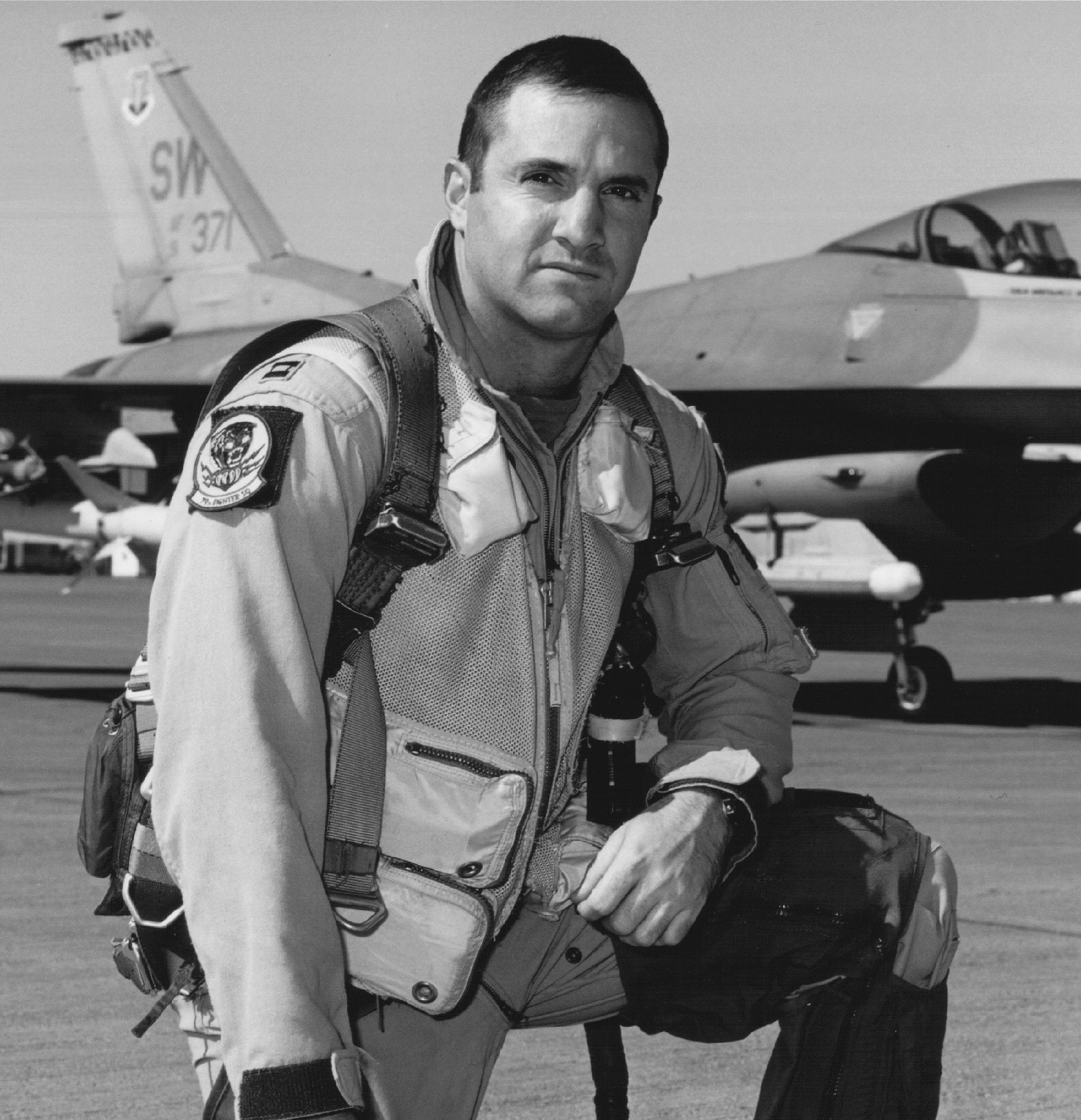
Waldo Waldman kneeling in front of his F-16.

Waldman attended the United States Air Force Academy where he graduated in 1990. During his time as a combat pilot, he participated in 65 combat missions which included Operation Allied Force in Yugoslavia and enforcing the no-fly zone in Iraq.

Three years into his military career, Waldman was involved in a scuba diving accident in which his scuba mask broke while descending on a dive. Waldman did not suffer physical injury, but he developed severe claustrophobia as a result of the accident. He overcame the claustrophobia and continued flying for his remaining years on active duty. He then joined the Air Force Reserve and eventually retired with over 2,650 flight hours and 65 combat missions.

== Writing and public speaking ==
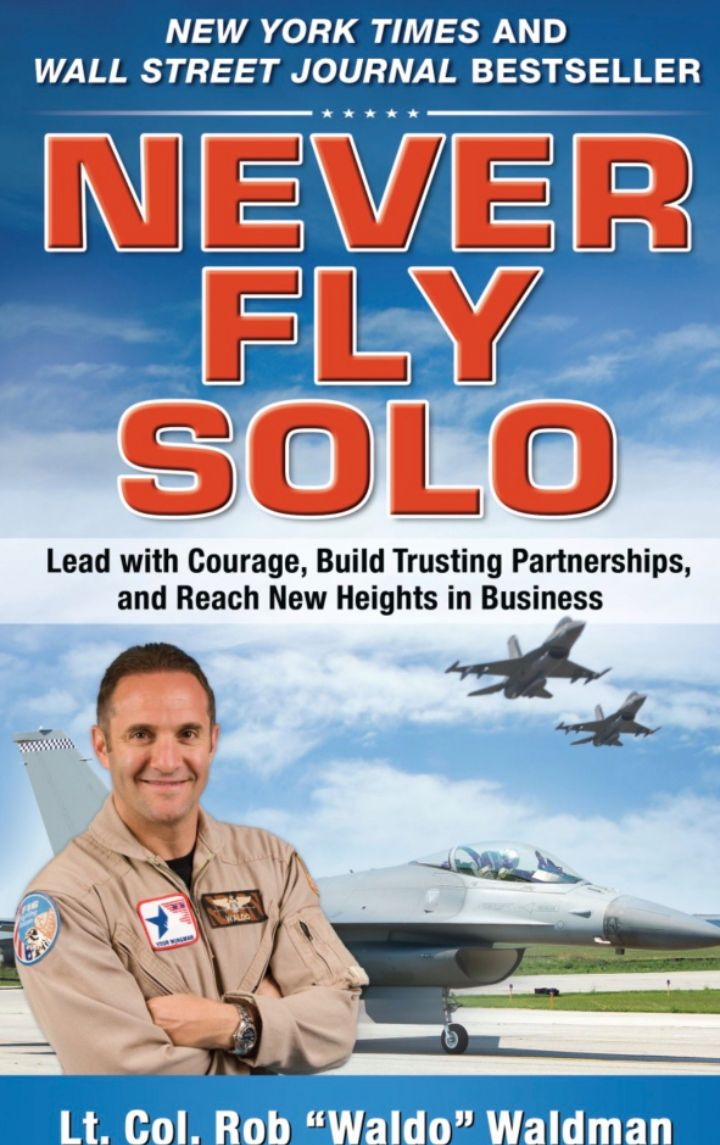

Waldman earned his M.B.A. while in the Air Force and began working in the sales department of a technology company when he retired. He went on to work for commission at a merger and acquisitions firm prior to founding Wingman Enterprises. He was also previously employed by SimiGon and worked with his brother in a financial consulting firm.

Waldman is the founder of Wingman Enterprises, a consulting firm based in Georgia. As part of Wingman Enterprises, Waldman uses his personal experiences in combat and in business to teach companies how to build relationships with employees, partners, and customers.

Waldman has delivered leadership-focused presentations for organizations across business, government, and nonprofit sectors. His work has been featured in publications including CNBC, BusinessWeek, SUCCESS Magazine, and Investor's Business Daily.

In 2009, Waldman published Never Fly Solo, a book that outlines the principles he teaches in his consulting business. The book made the bestseller lists of both the New York Times and the Wall Street Journal in 2009 and was featured in a Geoffrey James article in Inc. Magazine in 2012. It also reached number one in three different categories on Amazon.com on December 3, 2009. Waldman has also written for numerous publications including the Harvard Business Review, SUCCESS Magazine, and The Atlanta Journal-Constitution.

After retiring from the United States Air Force, Waldo Waldman earned an MBA and worked in senior sales and business development roles within technology and consulting organizations. He later transitioned into professional speaking and leadership consulting.

== Board and advisory roles ==
In 2023, Waldman joined the Board of Directors of the Information Distribution and Consulting Association International Data Center Authority (IDCA), serving as Human Capital Counsel.

== Awards and recognition ==
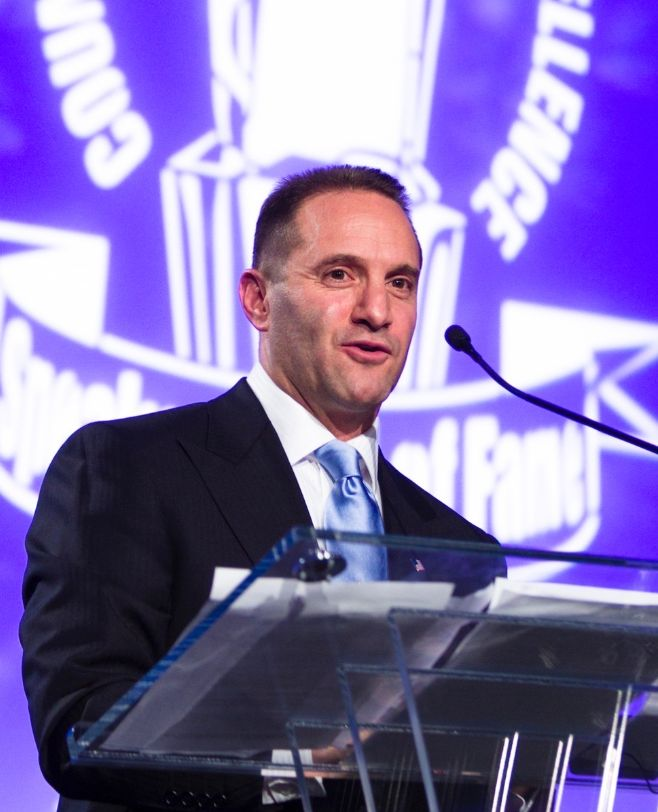
Waldo receiving award and recognition.

Waldman earned numerous awards during his military career. Medals include the Air Medal (five time recipient), the Aerial Achievement Medal (two time recipient), the Air Force Commendation Medal (four time recipient), and the Meritorious Service Medal (two time recipient).

He is an inductee of the National Speakers Association Speaker Hall of Fame (CPAE Award) and holds the Certified Speaking Professional (CSP) designation.

In 2007, Waldman was recognized by the Atlanta Business Chronicle by making its 40 Under 40 list of business leaders in Atlanta. In 2013, Waldo received the Council of Peers Award for Excellence when he was inducted into the National Speaker's Association Speaker Hall of Fame.

== Personal life ==
Waldman was born one of four children. He has an identical twin brother Dave with whom he co-founded The Wingman Foundation. The Foundation raises funds and awareness to help soldiers, veterans, and their families who are in need and he resides in Atlanta, Georgia, with his family.
