= Marilyn Robinson Waldman =

American historian (1943–1996)

- Born: Marilyn Gail Robinson; April 13, 1943; Dallas, Texas, U.S.
- Died: July 8, 1996 (aged 53); Columbus, Ohio, U.S.
- Occupations: Historian, college professor
- Children: Amy Waldman

Marilyn Gail Robinson Waldman (April 13, 1943 – July 8, 1996) was an American historian of Islam and Sufism, and a professor at Ohio State University from 1974 to 1996.

== Early life and education ==
Waldman was born in Dallas, Texas, the daughter of Morris Robinson (born (Mowsz Pintel) and Sophie Schwiff Robinson. Her parents were both Jewish immigrants from Poland. She graduated from Radcliffe College in 1964, with a bachelor's degree in African history, and earned a master's degree (1966) and Ph.D. (1974) from the University of Chicago, where she was the last doctoral student of Marshall Hodgson.

== Career ==
Waldman was a historian of Islam, and a professor of history at Ohio State University from 1974 to 1996. She also directed the university's Division of Comparative Studies in the Humanities, and established its Religious Studies program. She co-organized a symposium series on the history of Islam, spoke to campus and community groups on Islam, and won the Bjornson Humanities Award from the Ohio Humanities Council. She contributed the "Islamic world" article to the Encyclopædia Britannica. She was a member of the Middle East Studies Association.

Her research was published in scholarly journals including The Journal of African History, Africa: Journal of the International African Institute, Journal of the American Oriental Society, Journal of Interdisciplinary History, Critical inquiry, Journal of Developing Societies, History of Religions, and Journal of Religion in Africa.

== Publications ==
- "The Fulani Jihād: A Reassessment" (1965)
- "A Note on the Ethnic Interpretation of the Fulani 'Jihād'" (1966)
- "The Development of the Concept of Kufr in the Qur'ān" (1968)
- "Islamic Studies: A New Orientalism?" (1978, review essay)
- Toward a Theory of Historical Narrative: A Case Study in Perso-Islamicate Historiography (1980)
- "A Perspective on the World of Islam" (1981, newspaper essay)
- "'The Otherwise Unnoteworthy Year 711': A Reply to Hayden White" (1981)
- "The Popular Appeal of the Prophetic Paradigm in West Africa" (1982)
- The Islamic World (1984, co-edited with William H. McNeill)
- "Tradition as a Modality of Change: Islamic Examples" (1986)
- "Reflections on Islamic Tradition, Women, and Family" (1991)
- "Translatability: A Discussion" (1992, with Olabiyi Babalola Yai and Lamin Sanneh)
- "Innovation as Renovation: The 'Prophet' as an Agent of Change" (1992, with Robert M. Baum)
- Prophecy and Power: Muhammad and the Qur'an in the Light of Comparison (2012, published posthumously, co-edited by Bruce B. Lawrence, Lindsay Jones, and Robert M. Baum)

== Personal life ==
Marilyn Robinson married political scientist Loren K. Waldman. Novelist and journalist Amy Waldman is their daughter. Waldman died from cancer in 1996, at the age of 53, in Columbus.
