= Career Suicide (album) =

Studio album by A Wilhelm Scream
- Released: October 9, 2007
- Recorded: May 2007
- Studio: The Blasting Room, Fort Collins, Colorado
- Genre: Punk rock, melodic hardcore
- Length: 35:00
- Label: Nitro
- Producer: Bill Stevenson, Jason Livermore

A Wilhelm Scream chronology
Ruiner (2005)	Career Suicide (2007)	A Wilhelm Scream (2009)

Career Suicide, released on October 9, 2007, through Nitro Records, is the fifth studio album from the Massachusetts based melodic hardcore band A Wilhelm Scream.

== Background ==
Pre-production for the band's next album was held at Black & Blue Project Studio in New Bedford, Massachusetts with Joe Reilly and Jonathan Teves. Career Suicide was recorded at The Blasting Room in Fort Collins, Colorado in May 2007 with Bill Stevenson and Jason Livermore as producers. The pair, plus Andrew Berlin and Johnny Schou, acted as engineers, with additional engineering from Mark Sturdevant and Jason Allen. Livermore mixed and mastered the recordings.

== Release ==
On August 9, 2007, Career Suicide was announced for release, and the album's track listing was revealed. In August, the band supported Strung Out on their North American tour. The album's artwork was posted online on September 13, 2007. Later that month, Guitarist Christopher Levesque announced he would be leaving the band after a few shows, citing a lack of enjoyment from touring. "The Horse" and "These Dead Streets" were posted on the band's Myspace on October 2. The album was released on October 9. In October, the group went on a US tour with Only Crime and the Swellers. On October 25, "Die While We're Young" was made available for free download via Fuse's website. On October 30, a music video was released for "Die While We're Young" via Alternative Press. In November and December, the band played a handful of shows with the Fall of Troy and Schoolyard Heroes, before ending the year with a tour with the Flatliners. For these treks, Nick Diener of the Swellers temporarily filled in Levesque's role.

In January 2008, Mike Supina of Alucard was announced as Levesque's full-time replacement. Following a UK tour with Failsafe and All Idols Fall, the band toured across the US in March and April 2008 alongside the Unseen. On April 1, a music video was released for "I Wipe My Ass with Showbiz". According to Alternative Press, the video was aimed at "fashioned-obsessed music business executives". In May 2008, the band performed at the Groezrock festival in Belgium, and then went on a tour of Australia. The album was pressed on vinyl through Asscard Records and Jumpstart Records in July 2008. That same month, they went on a US tour with the Swellers, followed by a Canadian tour with Living with Lions and various shows in Europe until September 2008. The band made an appearance at The Fest later on; they ended the year performing at the Rock for Tots festival. On December 31, the band posted an outtake from the recording sessions, "The I Hate ___ Club", on their Myspace. Vocalist/guitarist Trevor Reilly said it was "easily in my top three of the Career Suicide session songs. Why was it left off the record you ask? Bill [Stevenson] and Jason [Livermore] said 'no hate club or route 40 on the record' and we said 'ok.'" In January and February 2009, the band supported Streetlight Manifesto on their headlining tour of the US.

== Music ==
A Wilhelm Scream made a conscious effort to abandon certain elements of their album Ruiner when writing Career Suicide. The band dropped many of the emo and post hardcore elements entirely. They also decided to forgo writing any slow or mid-tempo songs for the album, instead focusing on speed. Guitarist/vocalist Trevor Reilly mentioned that the goal of the band was to create a relentless album that would not have any "breaks" like their previous two albums had. As a result, several songs on Career Suicide are shorter than two minutes in length and the tempos are significantly faster compared to A Wilhelm Scream's previous albums. The album's overall sound is closer to skate punk than melodic hardcore, but is still considered highly progressive and technical for the genre.

Career Suicide was the debut album for bassist Brian Robinson with A Wilhelm Scream. Reilly would go on to say in later interviews that the album would not have been possible without Robinson's bass playing. He would go on to compare Robinson's introduction to the band as similar to Travis Barker's arrival in Blink 182; Robinson's bass playing was so advanced that Reilly himself, drummer Nick Angelini, and guitarist Chris Levesque felt inspired to be more proficient at their instruments and write more complex rhythms and riffs. This allowed A Wilhelm Scream to maintain their signature technical style while playing faster and shorter songs. Robinson also inspired Reilly to further his lead guitar playing and play more solos on Career Suicide, something that the guitarist first experimented with on Ruiner. The bassist himself also added several solos of his own on songs such as "The Horse", "Jaws 3, People 0", and "Check Request Denied".

Career Suicide contains the longest song they have written to date (We Built This city...On Debts and Booze).

== Reception ==
Professional ratings
Review scores
Source	Rating
Europunk.net	4.5/5 stars
Punknews.org	4/5 stars
Rockfreaks.net	9/10 stars
Alternative Press	4.5/5 stars

The album received mostly favorable reviews. It was also voted the best album of 2007 by Punknews.org readers.

== Track listing ==
All music by A Wilhelm Scream. All lyrics by Trevor Reilly, except "Check Request Denied" co-written with Nuno Pereira.

No.	Title	Length
1.	"I Wipe My Ass With Showbiz"	1:05
2.	"5 to 9"	2:39
3.	"The Horse"	4:53
4.	"Die While We're Young"	2:32
5.	"Jaws 3, People 0"	2:40
6.	"Career Suicide"	1:35
7.	"These Dead Streets"	2:16
8.	"Get Mad, You Son of a Bitch!"	3:55
9.	"Our Ghosts (Contemporary/Consensual)"	2:11
10.	"Cold Slither II"	2:20
11.	"Pardon Me, Thanks a Lot"	1:32
12.	"Check Request Denied"	1:52
13.	"We Built This City! (On Debts and Booze)"	5:36
Total length:		35:00

Japanese edition
No.	Title	Length
14.	"Route 40 One Six"	1:59
Total length:		36:59

== Videos ==
- On September 17, 2007, the final cut of the video for the song "5 to 9" was released via the Nitro Records webpage.
- On October 31, 2007, a video for the song "Die While We're Young" was released via the Nitro Records webpage. The video features footage from the band's recent European tour.
- A video shooting for the song "I Wipe My Ass With Showbiz" was announced in a Myspace bulletin that detailed the video being shot at an undisclosed location, as well as at a show in Manchester, UK. This video was released on March 31, 2008, through the band's blog on MySpace.

== Personnel ==
Personnel per booklet.

A Wilhelm Scream

- Nicholas Pasquale Angelini – drums
- Trevor Reilly – guitar, backing vocals
- Nuno Pereira – lead vocals
- Brian J. Robinson – bass guitar, backing vocals
- Christopher Levesque – guitar

Production

- Bill Stevenson – producer, engineer
- Jason Livermore – producer, engineer, mixing, mixing, mastering
- Andrew Berlin – engineer
- Johnny Schou – engineer
- Mark Sturdevant – additional engineer
- Jason Allen – additional engineer
- Joe Reilly – pre-production
- Jonathan Teves – pre-production

Design

- JRTMCP – layout, design, concept
- Emily Walter – photography
- Ryan Levesque – cover Career Suicide, Cock Fight paintings
- Derek Deal – Rhino, Piranha
- Jamie Despres – Squid, Whale, Cheney
- Kate Ouellette – Alligator, Cats
- Jarrett McPhee – Cobra, Mongoose, Monkey Knife Fight
- AWS – concept

== Charts ==
Album

Chart (2007)	Peak position
Top Heatseekers	33
