= Lost Somewhere Between the Earth and My Home =

Studio album by the Geraldine Fibbers
- Released: July 18, 1995
- Recorded: March–April 1995
- Studio: Bad Animals (Seattle); Rumbo (Los Angeles)
- Genre: Alternative country
- Length: 56:58
- Label: Virgin
- Producer: Steve Fisk

The Geraldine Fibbers chronology
Lost Somewhere Between the Earth and My Home (1995)	What Part of Get Thee Gone Don't You Understand? (1997)

Singles from Geraldine Fibbers
- 1. "Dragon Lady" Released: June 12, 1995

Lost Somewhere Between the Earth and My Home is the debut studio album by American alternative country band the Geraldine Fibbers. It was released on July 18, 1995, on Virgin Records. "Dragon Lady" was released as a promotional music video and single in June 1995. The band supported the album by touring as part of the 1995 edition of Lollapalooza.

== Lyrics ==
The album's lyrics, written by the band's frontwoman Carla Bozulich, focus on somber topics including, but not limited to, abusive relationships and prostitution. The album's songs also discuss drug use at length, as well as the concept of loss of identity.

== Music ==
Bozulich, in addition to writing the band's songs, also served as their lead vocalist. On this album, her voice was described by the Los Angeles Times as "raw, raspy, [and] Joplin-tinged." CMJ noted that the album's restrained, roots-rock instrumentation is virtually the polar opposite of the music Bozulich made in her previous band, Ethyl Meatplow.

== Reception ==
Professional ratings
Review scores
Source	Rating
AllMusic	3/5 stars
Christgau's Consumer Guide	(1-star Honorable Mention)
Entertainment Weekly	A−
The Guardian	3/5 stars
Los Angeles Times	4/4 stars
The Philadelphia Inquirer	3/4 stars
Q	3/5 stars
Spin	9/10

Lost Somewhere Between the Earth and My Home received mixed to positive reviews upon its release, with some critics comparing the band to X due to their shared country-music-influenced sounds. No Depression critic Neil Weiss called it "a tough, confusing record, both thematically and musically", rooted "in the street poetics of the Hollywood underground by way of some West Virginian backwoods on a planet five times more sinister than our own." The Calgary Herald noted that "Bozulich's voice oscillates between caress and crescendo, offering visions that feel like American folklore stepping into a Dali painting." Spin listed Lost Somewhere Between the Earth and My Home as the ninth best album of 1995.

More recently, other musicians have written very favorably of the album; for instance, Lydia Lunch named it one of her 13 favorite albums in 2013. A 2009 article in Magnet called the album a "lost classic", and said that on the album, "the Fibbers' warped alt-country twang haunted the City of Angels like ghosts of California country’s past, full of grinding violin and poisoned tales of junkies, madness and lost innocence." Nels Cline, who joined the Geraldine Fibbers for the recording of their second album, Butch, called Lost "a stone classic" in an interview with the Vancouver Sun in 2014. In 2017, Al Shipley of Vice described the album as a "country feedback masterpiece", adding that it was his "...favorite rock album of the 90's."

== 2017 Vinyl Reissue ==
Jealous Butcher reissued the album May 5, 2017. Steve Fisk returned to mix the album for its first vinyl release. The initial 1,000 copies were released on clear vinyl. The new pressing and future vinyl pressings include four bonus tracks: "Bitter Honey" and "234" from the original sessions, a previously unreleased version of their cover of Can's "Yoo Doo Right" predating the version on the album Butch and featuring Daniel Keenan and Nels Cline on guitars, and a new song "Thank You for Giving Me Life" with Bozulich, Cline, Tutton, Fitzgerald and Moss as the lineup.

== Track listing ==
No.	Title	Writer(s)	Length
1.	"Lilybelle"	Carla Bozulich, Dave Franklin, Daniel Keenan, Irving Taylor	4:54
2.	"The Small Song"	Bozulich	3:30
3.	"Marmalade"	Bozulich, Keenan	5:09
4.	"Dragon Lady"	Bozulich, Fitzgerald, Keenan, William Tutton	4:50
5.	"A Song About Walls"	Bozulich, Keenan	4:20
6.	"House Is Falling"	Bozulich, Keenan	4:23
7.	"Outside of Town"	Bozulich	4:58
8.	"The French Song"	Bozulich, Fitzgerald, Tutton	6:04
9.	"Dusted"	Bozulich, Fitzgerald	2:40
10.	"Richard"	Bozulich, Fitzgerald	5:24
11.	"Blast Off Baby"	Bozulich	4:09
12.	"Get Thee Gone"	Bozulich	6:37

== Personnel ==
The Geraldine Fibbers

- Carla Bozulich – guitar, vocals
- Kevin Fitzgerald – banjo, drums
- Jessy Greene – viola, violin
- Daniel Keenan – guitar
- William Tutton – bass

Additional personnel

- Mark Brooks – art direction
- Steve Fisk – mixing, piano, production
- Dave Franklin – composition
- John Goodmanson – engineering, mixing
- Rob Groome – engineering
- Sam Hoffstead – engineering
- Jean Krikorian – design
- Len Peltier – art direction
- Eddy Schreyer – mastering
- Irving Taylor – composition
