= Red Headed Stranger (song) =

"Redheaded Stranger"

Single by Arthur "Guitar Boogie" Smith
- B-side: "Sobbin' Women"
- Released: June 1954
- Genre: Country
- Label: MGM
- Songwriter: Lindeman/Stutz

Arthur "Guitar Boogie" Smith singles chronology
"I Get So Lonely" (1954)	"Redheaded Stranger" (1954)	"Lonesome" (1954)

Red Headed Stranger is a song written by Edith Lindeman and Carl Stutz, published in 1953. Originally written for Perry Como, the song was not recorded by him due to publishing issues. In 1954, Arthur "Guitar Boogie" Smith released a version of the song on MGM Records that received good radio play.

Country singer-songwriter Willie Nelson performed the song at the time of its original release for children at bedtime on his show, The Western Express. In 1974, inspired by his then-wife Connie Koepke, he wrote the concept album Red Headed Stranger based on the song. Members of the Western Writers of America chose it as one of the Top 100 Western songs of all time.

== Background ==
The lyrics were written by Edith Lindeman, the entertainment editor of Virginia's Richmond Times-Dispatch. Carl Stutz, a musician who worked as an accountant and high school mathematics teacher, composed the music. The song was first published in 1953.

"The Red Headed Stranger" follows the story of "The Stranger", who rambles into town on a black stallion, leading the bay horse of his dead wife. The stranger meets a blond woman in a tavern, who follows him out as he leaves. The stranger shoots the woman as she grabs his bay, but leaves town after being found not guilty, considering that the woman tried to steal his horse.

Edith Lindeman recounts the origin of the lyrics: "I was just sitting at home one night, playing with the idea of colors." The redhead she had in mind was her husband. She named the town Blue Rock, gave the hero a "raging black stallion" and introduced him to a "yellow-haired" lady riding a bay-colored horse.

== Recordings ==
The ballad was originally written for Perry Como, but never recorded by him due to a publishing dispute. It was first recorded by Arthur "Guitar Boogie" Smith in 1954. Smith of Charlotte, North Carolina, was the host of the nationally syndicated country music program The Arthur Smith Show. The single was released on MGM Records with the number K11784, featuring on the flipside "Sobbin' Women" and credited to Arthur Smith and His Cracker-Jacks. Although the song did not chart, it received good radio airplay, in a September 1955, Billboard noted: "Arthur Smith's 'The Red Headed Stranger' [...] after a year or more is still drawing a large number of requests."

"The Redheaded Stranger" was included by Eddy Arnold in his 1959 RCA Victor release Thereby Hangs a Tale. A 1960 review of the album by Scholastic Voice remarked "Eddy Arnold is in a storytelling mood, with the sagas of Jesse James, Tom Dooley, and the curious Red Headed Stranger to keep you interested." Also in 1959, John D. Loudermilk released a cover version on the flipside of "The Happy Wonderer", on Columbia Records' number 41507.

"Red Headed Stranger"
The 1975 version by Nelson was included in the concept album of the same name

In 1954, Willie Nelson hosted The Western Express on KCNC in Fort Worth, Texas. At the time the record was released, Nelson played it at one in the afternoon to the children in the audience as a cradle tune. Nelson, who sang the song for his daughter Lana at bedtime, would occasionally also sing it himself on the show. While returning from a ski trip in Aspen, Colorado, in 1974, his then-wife Connie Koepke suggested to write a western concept album, based on "The Red Headed Stranger". Nelson mixed old songs from other artists and original compositions to create the concept of the Red Headed Stranger album: a fugitive on the run from the law after killing his wife and her lover. The album was certified gold in 1976 by the Recording Industry Association of America, and on November 21, 1986, it was certified double-platinum. Originally, Lindeman wrote a teleplay based on the song in 1954, which was never produced. In 1986, Nelson starred and produced the movie Red Headed Stranger.

In 1993, a 1955 live recording of the song by Glen Glenn, featuring Rose Maddox and her brothers was included in the UK release Missouri Rockabilly 1955 - 1965. Carla Bozulich recorded the song for her 2003 album The Red Headed Stranger. In 2013, Nelson recorded a duet of the song with Jack White. The six-inch single was released on Third Man Records TMR229.
