= Calisch =

Calisch is a surname with Dutch and Jewish connections. Notable people with this surname include:

- Edward Nathan Calisch (1865–1946), American rabbi
- Moritz Calisch (1819–1870), Dutch painter
- Betty Callish, born Babette Calisch (1886–after 1941), Dutch-born actress, singer and violinist
- Edith Lindeman, a.k.a. Edith Elliott Lindeman Calisch (1898–1984), American film and theatre critic and lyric writer
