= History of the Jews in Pennsylvania =

The history of the Jews in Pennsylvania (although not counting Crypto Jews or their descendants whom are also excluded from being counted as Jews) dates back to Colonial America.

== First mention ==
Pennsylvania, one of the original thirteen states of the American Union was named after William Penn's father, whose son received a grant of the territory from King Charles II in 1681.

When Peter Stuyvesant, in 1655, conquered the Swedish colonies on the Delaware River, three Jews, Abraham de Lucena, Salvator Dandrade, and Jacob Coen, requested permission to trade along the Delaware River (November 29, 1655), claiming that under the act of February 15, 1655, they had received the consent of the directors of the West India Company to travel, reside, trade and enjoy the same privileges as other inhabitants. This petition was refused "for weighty reasons", but they were permitted to send two persons to the South River (subsequently named the Delaware) in order to terminate a trading expedition already entered upon. These were the first Jews of whom there is any record in Pennsylvania.

On June 14, 1656, the directors of the West India Company wrote to Stuyvesant asking that the Jews be permitted to trade along the South River and "carry on their business as beforesaid". From this time on it is evident that the Jews traded with the Indians and Swedes in that territory. In 1657, Isaiah Mesa (also spelled "Masa" and "Mara"), "a Jew", is mentioned in the annals of Jacquet's administration as a participant in several lawsuits. In 1662, a community of Mennonites or Anabaptists proposed to settle at Horekill, in Delaware County, and in their articles of association they determined to exclude all "usurious Jews". When Sir Robert Carr, in 1664, assumed command of the Delaware in the name of the English crown, he received instructions from his government that "all people should enjoy the liberty of their conscience".

== Philadelphia ==
In 1681, when William Penn gained possession of the land that bears his name, there must have been several Jewish settlers in the southeastern portion. The earliest Jewish resident of Philadelphia of whom there is any record was Jonas Aaron, who was living there in 1703.

The most prominent member of the Jewish community in the early history of the colony was Isaac Miranda. The date of his birth is not known; he died in Lancaster, Pennsylvania, in 1733. He arrived in the colony very early in the 18th century, and was one of the earliest Jewish settlers in Philadelphia and the first in Lancaster. In 1723, James Logan, secretary of the province, refers to him as an "apostate Jew or fashionable Christian proselyte," who had gone into the interior of the colony to transact some official business. In 1727, Miranda was appointed "agent to receive and collect the perquisites and rights of Admiralty," and on June 19, 1727, he was appointed "deputy judge of the Court of Vice-Admiralty" — the first judicial office held by a Jew in the provinces. He was a large holder of land, and his name is frequently mentioned in the archives of the colony. In 1730 (or 1720), the Indians of Lancaster made a complaint that he had acted unfairly toward them, but no action is recorded in the matter.

== Lancaster ==
Jews came from the other colonies; some from New York, some even from Georgia, and took up their abode in the province. After Philadelphia, the next city in which they settled was Lancaster. The first Jewish resident was Isaac Miranda (see above), who owned property there before the town and county were organized in 1730. Ten years later, there were several Jewish families in the town; on February 3, 1747, there was recorded a deed to Isaac Nunus Ricus (Henriques) and Joseph Simon, conveying half an acre of land "in trust for the society of Jews settled in and about Lancaster", to be used as a place of burial. Henriques had come from Georgia in 1741. Joseph Simon was perhaps the best-known Jewish merchant in the county, while Dr. Isaac Cohen, one of the first residents of Lancaster, was the earliest Jewish physician in Pennsylvania.

== Scranton ==
Scranton is the sixth-largest city in the state and the county seat of Lackawanna County. Jews settled there when the city was still called Harrison or Slocum's Hollow, the present name having been given to the city about 1850.

The first Jew to hold public office was Joseph Rosenthal, who was Scranton's first, and for a long time its only, policeman. This was in 1860, when the population numbered but 8,500.

The first Jewish congregation was organized in 1858, and was reconstituted in 1860 under the name "Anshe Ḥesed." In 1866, the synagogue on Linden street was built, it was the first building reared exclusively as a Jewish place of worship in Lackawanna County. This edifice, after having been twice rebuilt, was sold to the first Polish congregation in 1902, when the present temple, situated on Madison Avenue near Vine Street, was dedicated. E. K. Fisher was the first rabbi; and his successors were Rabbis-Cohn, Weil, Sohn, Eppstein, Freudenthal, Löwenberg, Feuerlicht, and Chapman; A. S. Anspacher was the Rabbi in 1905. The Rabbi as of 2010 was Rabbi Fine.

As of 1906, there were about 5,000 Jews in Scranton in a total population of 105,000. They supported, in all, five congregations, and two Hebrew schools holding daily sessions. One of the latter, the Montefiore Hebrew School, had a well-equipped corps of teachers and an enrollment of about 200 male pupils. The other school which had higher attendance, possessed its own house in the South Side of the city, and was supported entirely by the large Hungarian community. For a while during the 1920s this community was headed by Rabbi Boruch Greenfeld, the author of the Sefer Ohel Boruch.

The more important charitable organizations were: the Hebrew Ladies' Relief Society, the Ladies' Aid Society, the Deborah Verein, the South Side Relief Society, the Kitchen Garden School, and the Industrial Aid Society, a branch of the New York Removal Office.

== Reading ==
A city in Berks County. A few Jewish immigrants settled here before 1847, when Reading became a city. In 1864, a cemetery plot was acquired in the southern part of the city, and in the same year Congregation Oheb Sholom was founded with about fifteen charter members, most of them South-Germans.

In 1884, a house of worship, located on Chestnut Street near Pearl Street, was bought from the Evangelical Church, and, after being rebuilt, it was dedicated July 31, 1885, by Isaac M. Wise. A rabbi and Sabbath-school teacher was engaged; and Reform service of a moderate type was instituted. In 1897 Rabbi Julius Frank, introduced the Union Prayer Book and full Reform service. In 1898 the congregation bought another cemetery at Shillington, three miles (5 km) from the city, the old one being vacated, and about sixty bodies were removed to the new burial-ground. Connected with the congregation are the Ladies' Hebrew Aid Society and the Ladies' Auxiliary.

Reading's Conservative Jewish synagogue, Kesher Zion, was founded in 1929 from the merger of two other synagogues, and has been located across the street from City Park since 1950. Today the Reform Congregation Oheb Sholom and the Conservative synagogue Kesher Zion share a Temple in Wyomissing Hills, PA.

The Orthodox Jewish element, consisting entirely of Russian and Polish immigrants or their descendants, combined in 1887 and formed Congregation Shomrei Habrith. Their house of worship was located on North 8th street. A Hebrew School, that was situated on Moss street, is connected with this congregation. Today, Shomrei Habrith has moved to a newer, and better location better to serve the communities needs, with its rabbi, Yosef Lipsker, ho also represents the local Chabad Lubavitch movement.

Reading has a population of about 90,000, of whom approximately 800 are Jews. Most of these are engaged in mercantile life, and a few are manufacturers. Ben Austrian, a painter of still life, has gained a reputation in the artistic world. There was also a pastor of Hebrew-Spanish (Sephardic) ancestry, a non-Mennonite, in the city of Reading with the Atlantic Coast Conference of the Mennonite Church USA. Albert Boscov was a member of the Jewish community of Reading, PA. Max Hassel, a bootlegger during Prohibition, operated from Reading, PA.

== Easton ==
Easton, in Northampton County, was another town that contained pre-Revolutionary Jewish inhabitants.

The first merchant in the town was Myer Hart de Shira (Texeira? See Hart), who is mentioned among the founders of Easton in 1750. He took the oath of allegiance to the colonial government in 1764, and became one of Easton's most wealthy citizens.

Michael Hart (not related to Myer Hart) was an early resident. He was born in 1738 and became very rich, owning much property in the surrounding country. Michael Hart deeded to his son Jacob, on March 25, 1800, ground for a burial-place for the Jews.

Although there were several families residing in Easton, a synagogue was not founded until 1839, when the Congregation Brit Sholom was established. It was chartered on November 25, 1842, and the Rev. Morris Kohn was its first rabbi.

== Aaronsburg ==
Beginning as a post village situated in Haines Township, Centre County, Pennsylvania, founded by Aaron Levy in 1786, and named for him. In June 1779, Levy bought off a Mr. Wetzel a tract in Centre County known as the Alexander Grant warranty. Upon this he laid out and planned the town of Aaronsburg, the town plan being recorded at Sunbury on October 4, 1786. A plot of ground known as Aaron's Square was reserved by the founder for public uses, and one of the streets was named Rachel's Way in honor of his wife. On November 16, 1789, Levy gave to the trustees of the Salem Evangelical Church a lot upon which to erect a church and schoolhouse. Aaronsburg is the first town in Pennsylvania (and probably in the United States) that was laid out by and named after a Jew.

== Schaefferstown ==
Schaefferstown, now in Lebanon County, but originally in Lancaster County, is supposed to have contained Jewish inhabitants. According to tradition a synagogue existed there early in the 18th century, and a cemetery was established about 1732. The early German Pietists assumed many of the old Hebrew customs, and consequently were confounded with the Jews.

== Wilkes-Barre ==
Willkes-Barre is the county-seat and principal city of Luzerne County. Evidence points to 1838 as the date of arrival of the first Jewish settlers, among whom Martin Long, a Bavarian, was the most prominent.

Two years later, a society was organized for occasional worship, and until 1849 the incipient congregation held its services in various rooms. In August of that year it dedicated its first synagogue under the auspices of Moses Strasser, Isaac Leeser of Philadelphia, and Samuel Isaacs of New York. In 1857 the community was incorporated as the Congregation B'nai B'rith. Its earlier pulpit history is practically the record of the service of Herman Rubin, reader and teacher from 1853 to 1882. His successors have been David Stern, Victor Rundbacken, Israel Joseph and Marcus Salzman.

The rise of the younger generation gave a decided impetus to the growing tendency toward Reform, which resulted in the adoption of the Einhorn ritual. This yielded, in its turn, to the Union Prayer Book. B'nai B'rith, the largest congregation in the city, is the only Reform organization.

Until 1871, B'nai B'rith was the only congregation in Wilkes-Barre, but in that year the first efforts were made to unite the Orthodox Jews. The organization, little more than a minyan, became the parent of the congregations B'nai Jacob and Holche Yosher, which were formed in 1881, although their synagogues were not built until 1886 and 1887, respectively. In 1902, a fourth synagogue was dedicated to the use of the youngest congregation, Oheb Zedek (Anshe Ungarn).

The Jewish educational, philanthropic, and social activities of the city at the time were entrusted to the following institutions: the religious and Hebrew schools, the Synagogue Industrial School, branch lodges of the leading Jewish orders, the Young Men's Hebrew Association, the social and literary clubs, four aid societies, a free loan association, and the executive committee of Jewish Congregations. The latter organization, after 1901, aided the Industrial Removal Office, working to reduce the number of Jewish immigrants in New York City, thus lessening the attendant reaction of immigration restrictionists, and winning public opinion for continued immigration.

With this equipment, the community became an important center of Jewish activity in northeastern Pennsylvania, reaching out to Hazleton, Plymouth, Pittston and the smaller towns in the vicinity. As of 1905, the Jews of Wilkes-Barre numbered about 1,800, or about three percent of the total population.

== Other Early History ==
Many Jews were connected with the sale and exploitation of land in Pennsylvania. In 1763, owing to the depredations of the Shawnee and Delaware Indians in Bedford County, twelve traders suffered a loss of £80,000, among whom were David Franks, Levy Andrew Levy, and Joseph Simon.

On July 5, 1773, the sale of southern Illinois took place. The Indian nations of the Illinois country conveyed their property to twenty-two residents of Pennsylvania, among whom were Moses Franks, Jacob Franks, Barnard Gratz, Michael Gratz, David Franks, Moses Franks, Jr., Joseph Simon and Levy Andrew Levy. This territory never became the property of those interested in its sale.

The greatest speculator in land in the province was Aaron Levy, who in 1779 purchased land in Haines township, Center county, upon which he laid out the town of Aaronsburg (recorded October 4, 1786), the first town in the United States laid out and named after a Jew. Levy was interested with Robert Morris in the well-known speculation in lands in the western portion of the state which resulted so disastrously to the "financier of the Revolution" (see Levy, Aaron).

It is estimated that there were not more than 800 Jews in Pennsylvania at the close of the War of Independence. The greater portion had taken up their residence after 1765, and many had arrived eleven years later, after New York had been occupied by the British. The Jews enjoyed all the rights of the other inhabitants, except that none could become a member of the General Assembly. There was nothing in the Constitution as established by the General Convention in 1776 that prevented a Jew from becoming a judicial, executive or military officer of the commonwealth.

On December 23, 1783, Rabbi Gershom Mendes Seixas, Simon Nathan ("parnas"), Asher Myers, Barnard Gratz, and Haym Solomon, the "Mahamad" of the Congregation Mickvé Israel, Philadelphia, petitioned the Council of Censors that there be removed from the Constitution the declaration requiring each member of the Assembly to affirm his belief in the divine inspiration of the New Testament. The law was subsequently changed, and all civil disabilities of the Jews were removed.

== Successive settlers ==
The history of the Jews in Pennsylvania after 1825 is the history of their activities in the various cities in which they settled, and which are treated in the respective articles. Although Jews had taken an active interest in the development of the western portion of the state from a time preceding the Revolution, it was more in the way of speculation and investment; it was not until the first quarter of the 19th century that the Jews settled in Pittsburgh and the other western cities. Wilkes-Barre and Harrisburg had few Jewish inhabitants, and Aaronsburg, although founded by a Jew, had only a few Jewish residents.

It was not until after the Spanish and Portuguese Jews had ceased to migrate in numbers to America that the western portion of the state was settled, and this was owing to the arrival of many Jews of German and Polish origin. Yet the early Jewish pioneers, those that had settled in Philadelphia, Lancaster, and Easton long before the Revolution, had come from Germany and Holland, while the first settlers of New York; Newport, Rhode Island; and Savannah, Georgia, had been mostly of Spanish descent.

About 1825 there was a fresh exodus from Germany, and many Jews settled in Philadelphia and became important factors in the community, while others traveled westward and helped in the development of many towns.

=== Pittsburgh ===
Although Jews had been living in Pittsburgh ever since it was incorporated in 1804, it was not until 1830 that there was an actual Jewish community there, and this consisted of Jews of German origin. In 1846 the first congregation was organized and named "Etz-Chayim". It met in a small room in Third Street, over an engine-house; its first presiding officer was William Frank. The Congregation Rodef Sholem, one of the most important congregations in the state, was established in 1858. At present Pittsburgh (with Allegheny) contains the second-largest Jewish community in Pennsylvania.

=== Harrisburg ===
The first Jewish settlers in Harrisburg arrived from Germany in the early 1840s. The oldest congregation is Ohev Sholom, established in 1853 (present rabbi, Marc Kline); Chisuk Emmunah and Beth-El were established after 1884. The city possesses also a benevolent society and two other societies.

The present (1904) Jewish population of the city is 1,200 in a total of about 70,000 inhabitants.

=== Other areas ===
Other important towns containing many Jewish residents are: Wilkes-Barre, whose first synagogue, B'nai B'rith, was incorporated in 1848; Scranton, which has three synagogues, the earliest, the Anshe Chesed, having been incorporated January 7, 1862; Reading, which has two congregations, one of which, the Oheb Sholom, was founded May 1, 1864. In addition, the following towns contain enough Jewish families to support at least one synagogue: Allentown, Altoona, Beaver Falls, Braddock, Bradford, Butler, Carbondale, Chambersburg, Chester, Connellsville, Danville, DuBois, Dunmore, Duquesne, Erie, Greensburg, Hazleton, Homestead, Honesdale, Indiana, Johnstown, McKeesport, Newcastle, Oil City, Phænixville, Pottsville, Shamokin, Sharon, Shenandoah, South Bethlehem, South Sharon, Titusville, Uniontown, Washington, Williamsport, and York. Jews are settled with some sort of organization in at least fifty towns in the state.

The expulsion of the Jews from Russia was the occasion of many settling in this state. They began to arrive in 1882, and at the present time they constitute the majority of the Jewish population.

== 1906 statistics ==
In the state of Pennsylvania there were thirty-four cities and towns with one or more Jewish institutions. Of these, 31 have 92 regularly organized congregations, 2 hold holy-day services, and in 1 no communal religious life exists. There are 59 congregations with a membership of about 7,000 and an income of over $120,000; 8 congregations are affiliated with the Union of American Hebrew Congregations; 38 have together 33 cemeteries, and there are 2 cemeteries independent of organized congregations; 29 congregations report schools with 2,433 pupils; 7 schools are affiliated with the Hebrew Sabbath-School Union of America. Free religious schools are conducted by 2 societies, 1 reporting an income of $3,187, with 2,721 pupils; there are 2 Hebrew Free Schools with an income of $5,660, and instructing 430 pupils.

Exclusive of the schools and classes for religious instruction, there were, chiefly in Philadelphia, Pittsburgh, and Wilkesbarre, the following educational agencies: 1 manual-training school; 4 societies conducting industrial classes; 2 societies conducting evening classes; 2 kindergartens; 1 day-nursery; 2 alumni associations, furthering religious instruction; and 1 college for Hebrew studies. Three of these report an income of $21,316, and 3 others report 499 pupils. There are 41 charitable societies, 23 of which report an income of $219,324, of which $193,396 must be set to the credit of Philadelphia.

The charitable societies include 3 orphan asylums, 1 hospital, 1 home for incurables, 1 maternity hospital, 1 "friendly inn" and home for the aged—all except 1 orphan asylum being in Philadelphia. There are 11 social clubs (5 with an income of $25,620), 4 associations for young men (2 with an income of $4,718), 1 loan-association, 14 mutual-benefit societies—all in Philadelphia. There are also 12 literary clubs (11 in Philadelphia) and 2 musical associations. In two cities there were branches of the Alliance Israélite Universelle; in four, sections of the Council of Jewish Women; in five, 9 Zionist societies; and in seventeen, 60 lodges. The last-mentioned are distributed among the orders as follows: 25, Independent Order B'nai B'rith; 6, Independent OrderFree Sons of Israel; 17, Independent Order Sons of Benjamin; and 12, Order B'rith Abraham. The present population of Pennsylvania is 6,302,115, including more than 100,000 Jews.

== See also ==
- American Jews
  - List of American Jews
- History of the Jews in Colonial America
- History of the Jews in the United States

== Bibliography ==
- H. P. Rosenbach. History of the Jews of Philadelphia Prior to 1880. Philadelphia. 1883.
- Markens. The Hebrews in America. New York. 1888.
- Morais. The Jews of Philadelphia. Philadelphia. 1894.
- Publications Am. Jew. Hist. Soc.: A. S. W. Rosenbach, Notes on the First Settlement of Jews in Pennsylvania, 1655–1703 (1897, vol. v.).
- H. Necarsulmer. The Early Settlement of Lancaster. 1901, vol. ix.
- I. H. and A. S. W. Rosenbach. Aaron Levy. 1894, vol. ii.
- Morris Jastrow. The Jews of Philadelphia. 1893, vol. i.
- Henry Berkowitz. (1901, vol. ix.).
- Aaron Levy, by Isabella H. Rosenbach and Abraham S. Wolf Rosenbach, in Publ. Am. Jew. Hist. Soc. No. 2, 1894, pp. 157–163.

=== Other sources ===
- Daly, Settlement of the Jews in North America; Pennsylvania Colonial Records; Pennsylvania Archives.
- Watson, Annals, Philadelphia, 1868.
- Westcott's History of Philadelphia.
- Memoirs of the Historical Society of Pennsylvania.
- American Jewish Year Book, 1900–1.
- Pennsylvania Archives, First Series, i. 266; Second Series, ix. 738.
- American Historical Register, April 1895.
