= Willie Nelson filmography =

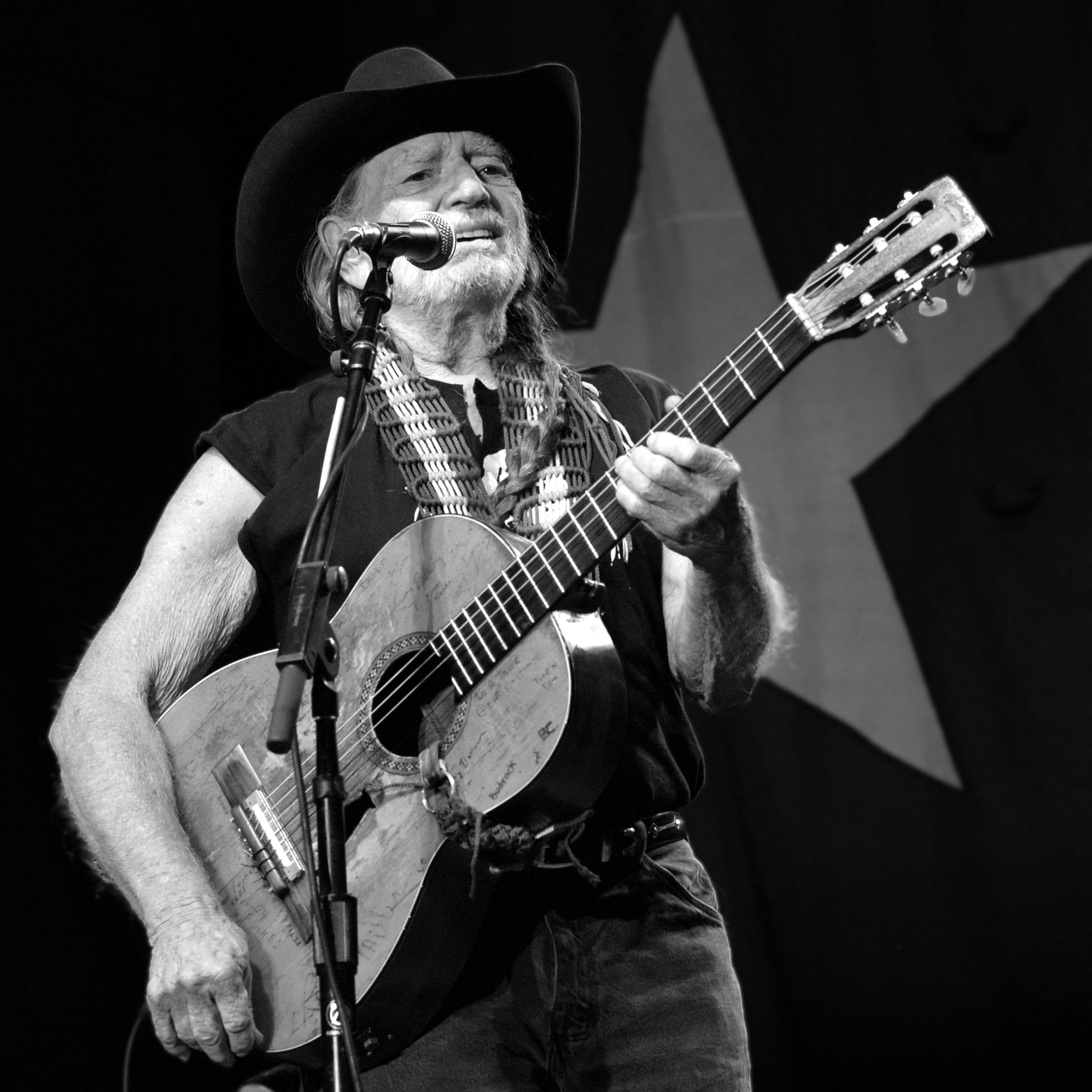
Willie Nelson performing in 2008

Country music singer Willie Nelson, besides a varied musical career, has appeared in many films since his debut in The Electric Horseman (1979). His highlights include Barbarosa, Honeysuckle Rose and the film version of his album Red Headed Stranger.

| Year | Title | Role | Notes |
|---|---|---|---|
| 1979 | The Electric Horseman | Wendell Hickson | |
| 1980 | Honeysuckle Rose | Buck Bonham | Nominated- Academy Award for Best Original Song (On the Road Again) |
| 1981 | Thief | David "Okla" Bertinneau | |
| 1982 | Barbarosa | Barbarosa | |
| 1982 | Coming Out of the Ice | "Red" Loon | |
| 1984 | Songwriter | "Doc" Jenkins | |
| 1986 | Red Headed Stranger | Reverend Julian Shay | |
| 1986 | The Last Days of Frank and Jesse James | General J.O. Shelby | |
| 1986 | Stagecoach | John "Doc" Holliday | |
| 1986 | Miami Vice | "El Viejo" | |
| 1987 | Saturday Night Live | Himself / Host / Musical Guest / Various | |
| 1988 | Once Upon a Texas Train | John Henry Lee | |
| 1988 | Where the Hell's That Gold?!!? | Cross | |
| 1990 | Pair Of Aces | Billy Roy Barker | |
| 1991 | Another Pair Of Aces | Billy Roy Barker | |
| 1994 | Dust to Dust | Lawyer Neil Morris | |
| 1995 | Big Dreams and Broken Hearts: The Dottie West Story | Himself | |
| 1996 | Starlight | Grampa Lium | |
| 1996 | Dr. Quinn, Medicine Woman | Elias Birch | |
| 1997 | Gone Fishin' | Billy "Catch" Pooler | |
| 1997 | Wag the Dog | Johnny Dean | |
| 1997 | King of the Hill | Himself | |
| 1997 | Nash Bridges | Earl Dobbs | |
| 1998 | Half Baked | Historian Smoker | |
| 1999 | The Long Kill | Lee Walker | |
| 1999 | Austin Powers: The Spy Who Shagged Me | Himself | |
| 2000 | The Simpsons | Himself | |
| 2001 | Space Ghost Coast to Coast | Himself | |
| 2002 | The Country Bears | Himself | |
| 2002 | Monk | Himself | |
| 2003 | Space Ghost Coast to Coast | Himself | |
| 2003 | The Austin Disaster, 1911 | The Narrator | |
| 2004 | The Big Bounce | Joe Lurie | |
| 2005 | The Dukes of Hazzard | Uncle Jesse Duke | |
| 2006 | Beerfest | Himself | |
| 2006 | Broken Bridges | Himself | |
| 2007 | The Dukes of Hazzard: The Beginning | Uncle Jesse Duke | |
| 2007 | Blonde Ambition | Pap Paw | |
| 2007 | Fighting with Anger | Will | |
| 2008 | Beer for my Horses | Charlie | |
| 2008 | Swing Vote | Himself | |
| 2008 | Surfer, Dude | Farmer Bob | |
| 2008 | A Colbert Christmas: The Greatest Gift of All! | Himself | |
| 2010 | Hempsters: Plant the Seed | Himself | |
| 2011 | Get a Job | Wedding Band Member | |
| 2011 | Toots and the Maytals: Reggae Got Soul | Himself | |
| 2011 | Shoot Out of Luck | Unknown | |
| 2013 | When Angels Sing | Nick | |
| 2016 | Zoolander 2 | Himself | |
| 2016 | Waiting for the Miracle to Come | Jimmy Riggs | |
| 2017 | Pure Country: Pure Heart | Himself | |
| 2017 | The American Epic Sessions | Himself | |
| 2017 | Lost in London | Himself | |
| 2018 | Paradox | "Red" | |
| 2021 | Commercial for Omega Mart | Himself | |
| 2021 | Commercial for FedEx (Delivering For Earth) | Himself | |
| 2023 | Willie and Me | Bones / Himself | |
