= The Real Oh My =

- Genres: Punk rock
- Members: Mike Watt; Nels Cline; Kevin Fitzgerald

The Real Oh My is an American side project band featuring Minutemen/Firehose bassist Mike Watt, Geraldine Fibbers/Wilco guitarist Nels Cline, and Circle Jerks drummer Kevin Fitzgerald. The trio, which plays occasional club gigs in the Los Angeles area, plays their own interpretations of Iggy & The Stooges and other classics.

The band's name is an accidental corruption of the closing lyric from "Down On The Street", the opening track of the Stooges' Fun House album. (The actual lyric is "Real O-Mind"). Watt, who named the band, did not know the correct lyric until he became a member of the Stooges himself in 2003.

This particular project band has been inactive in recent months due to Cline's increased involvement in Wilco.
