= Blackberry Winter =

- Short story by Robert Penn Warren
- Country: United States
- Language: English

Publication
- Publisher: Cummington Press
- Media type: Print (chapbook)
- Publication date: 1946

"Blackberry Winter" is a work of short fiction by Robert Penn Warren first appearing as a chapbook offered by Cummington Press in 1946. The story was collected in The Circus in the Attic and Other Stories (1947), published by Harcourt Brace & Company.

"Blackberry Winter" is the most anthologized of Warren's short stories and widely acclaimed by critics.

== Plot ==
The narrative is a remembrance by an unidentified middle-aged man 35 years after the events described, all of which occurred on a single day. The story is presented as a first-person narrative by the nine-year-old boy, Seth. The setting is Seth's grandfather's farm located in the rural border district of western Tennessee and Kentucky around 1910. The season is late spring in the month of June, and Seth and his parents are tending the farm. An uncommon "blackberry winter" has brought a brief return of locally cold and rainy weather, flooding the creeks.

In the early morning, Seth eagerly anticipates exploring the effects of the heavy rains on the farm. Accustomed to going barefoot in the summer, his mother insists that he resume wearing his shoes in the aftermath of the blackberry winter.

Intending to evade his mother, Seth prepares to depart the house unshod, but he sees a strange man approaching from the woods. Perplexed, he calls his mother. When the farm dogs scent the intruder and intercept him, Seth sees that the man momentarily draws a switchblade knife, then pockets it when Seth's mother calls off the dogs and greets the man. A tramp, he is seeking work to earn a meal. His demeanor is sullen and his behavior antisocial. Ignoring this, the mistress of the household assigns him some trivial tasks cleaning up the chicken and turkey pens. He is clearly unfamiliar with farmwork and utterly inept. Seth's efforts to engage with the tramp are rudely rebutted, and the boy departs for the creek.

Community members have gathered to observe the swollen river. Seth's father, mounted on a horse, pulls up his son on the saddle for a better view. When a dead cow floats by the bovine is identified as the property of one of the poorest men in the county, Milt Alley. Commentary is offered by the locals as to whether a malnourished person could eat a decomposing cow. A veteran of the Civil War who served with Nathan Bedford Forrest's cavalry reports that he consumed maggot-infested horseflesh during his enlistment in order to survive.

Seth's father departs to check on the flooded crops, and the boy visits the cabin of black sharecropper Old Jebb and his common law wife Dellie. Their son, Little Jebb, is Seth's 11-year-old playmate. Though deeply attached to this family, the young white visitor discovers they have been demoralized by the severity of the cold snap. Dellie slaps Little Jebb in the face for a minor offense.

Troubled, Seth returns home to find his father talking to the tramp. With no regular farm work available, his father bestows a half day's wage on the man; when the tramp curses him, he is ordered off the property. Seth fears for a moment that the man may draw his knife on his father. The boy feels himself compelled to follow the tramp down the road. Seth asks him where he came from and where he is going. The tramp turns and threatens "Stop following me. You don't stop following me I'll cut your throat you little son-of-a-bitch."

The denouement of the tale is related by the middle-aged Seth. He discloses that his father died at a relatively young age from lockjaw due to a farm-related injury. His mother had died three years later, grieving her husband's death. Seth's playmate, Little Jebb, is in a penitentiary for killing a man. Dellie is long dead, and Old Jebb has survived in good health to over 100 years of age.

Decades hence, since the tramp warned him not to follow, Seth as an adult reflects: "That was what he said, for me not to follow him. But I did follow him, all the years."

== Background ==
Biographer Joseph R. Millichap reminds the reader that, however realistic or autobiographical certain details the story may appear, many are not: the characters are purely fictional. The milieu that Warren creates is however based on his childhood in the "Black Patch" of rural western Kentucky and Tennessee in the early 20th century.

Robert Penn Warren in his Blackberry Winter: A Recollection: "It crosses my mind that the vividness with which I always remembered writing this story may have something to do with the situation in which it was written. It was the fall or winter of 1945-46 just after the war, and even if one had had no hand in the blood-letting, there was the sense that the world, and one's own life, would never be the same again."

== Critical appraisal ==
"I would give a false impression if I were to imply that this story is autobiographical. It is not. I never knew these particular people, only that world and people like them. And no tramp ever leaned down at me and said for me to stop following him or he would cut my throat. But if one had, I hope I would have been able to follow him anyway, in the way the boy in the story does." —Robert Penn Warren in "'Blackberry Winter': A Recollection", originally published in Understanding Fiction, 3rd edition (1979).

Biographer Allen G. Shepherd calls "Blackberry Winter" "short fiction of a high order."

Millichap writes, "Perhaps no single, postwar American story has been so often anthologized, so frequently alluded to, or so highly praised as 'Blackberry Winter.'"

== Theme ==
Millichap writes, "Warren's most famous tale does not depend on poetic prose or narrative artifice: rather, it balances a precise realism of detail, including accurate social observation and a harsh naturalism of theme against its lyric recollection of youthful innocence."

== Sources ==
- Millichap, Joseph R. 1992. Robert Penn Warren: A Study of the Short Fiction. Twayne Publishers, New York. Gordon Weaver, editor. ISBN 0-8057-8346-6
- Runyon, Randolph. 1985. "The View From the Attic: Robert Penn Warren's Circus Stories" Mississippi Quarterly, Spring 1985 in Robert Penn Warren: A Study of the Short Fiction. pp. 117–132 Twayne Publishers, ISBN 0-8057-8346-6
- Shepherd, Allen G. 1979. "Prototype, Byblow and Reconception: Notes on the Relation of Warren's The Circus in the Attic to His Novels and Poetry" Mississippi Quarterly, Winter 1979–1980 in Robert Penn Warren: A Study of the Short Fiction. pp. 104–116 Twayne Publishers, ISBN 0-8057-8346-6
- Warren, Robert Penn. 1983. The Circus in the Attic and Other Stories. A Harvest Book, Harcourt Brace & Company, New York. ISBN 0-15-618002-2 (paperback).
