= Blackberry winter =

Expression for cold snap

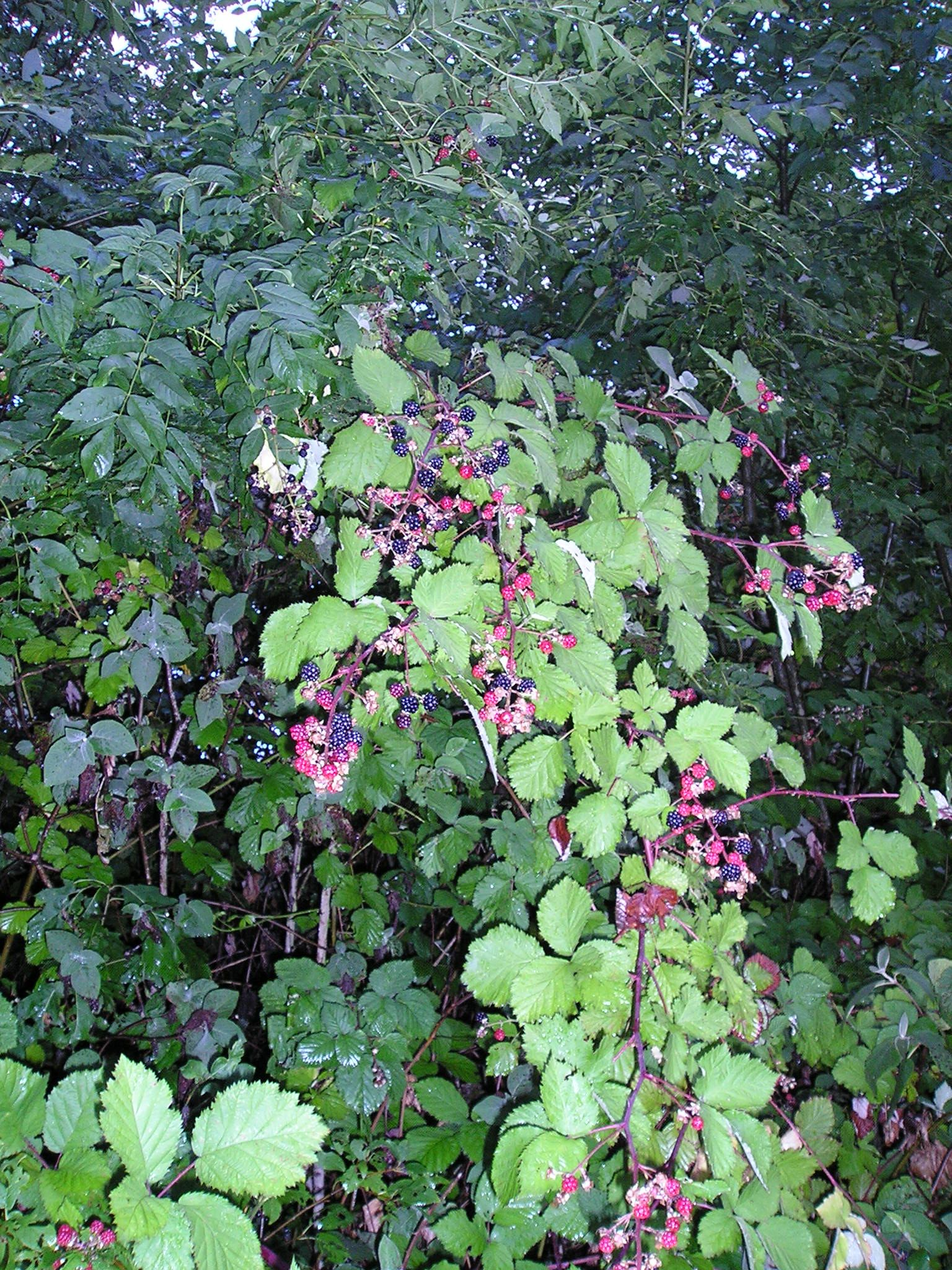
Blackberry with fruits

Blackberry winter is a colloquial expression used in south, midwest North America; as well as in Europe, Sinosphere Vietnam and East Asia, referring to a cold snap that often occurs in late spring when the blackberries are in bloom. Other colloquial names for spring cold snaps include "dogwood winter," "whippoorwill winter," "locust winter," and "redbud winter." The different names are based on what is blooming in particular regions during the typical spring cold snaps. Another colloquialism for these spring cold snaps is "linsey-woolsey britches winter," referring to a type of winter long underwear which could be put away after the last cold snap. The blackberry winter term may have arisen to describe the belief that a spring cold snap helps the blackberry canes to start growing.

"These unseasonal cold spells provide a mirror image of 'Indian summer' and likewise have a sequence of folk names derived from the blossoms scattered by these northern fronts; daffodil winter in April, dogwood winter in May, blackberry winter in June when the blackberry bushes are white with delicate blossoms." — Literary critic Joseph R. Millichap in Robert Penn Warren: A Study of the Short Fiction (1992)

In East Asia and Vietnam, the blackberry winter is known as Miss Ban's Winter (Chinese: 小班冷, Vietnamese: Rét Nàng Bân, Korean: 꽃샘추위), as it associated with an ancient folk tale of Miss Ban, a young daughter of the Jade Emperor who is hard-working but clumsy. She marries a husband, who is also a god, with the hope that she could improve her housework skills. In the winter, she dedicates herself to tailor clothes for her husband, but her clumsiness results in her being unable to finish the job until the end of winter. When she finishes, March has already gone by; thus she misses the winter. She falls down crying, and the Jade Emperor, touched by her will, decides to return the cold for a week to allow her husband to wear the clothes of Miss Ban. Thus, this is known as Miss Ban's Winter.

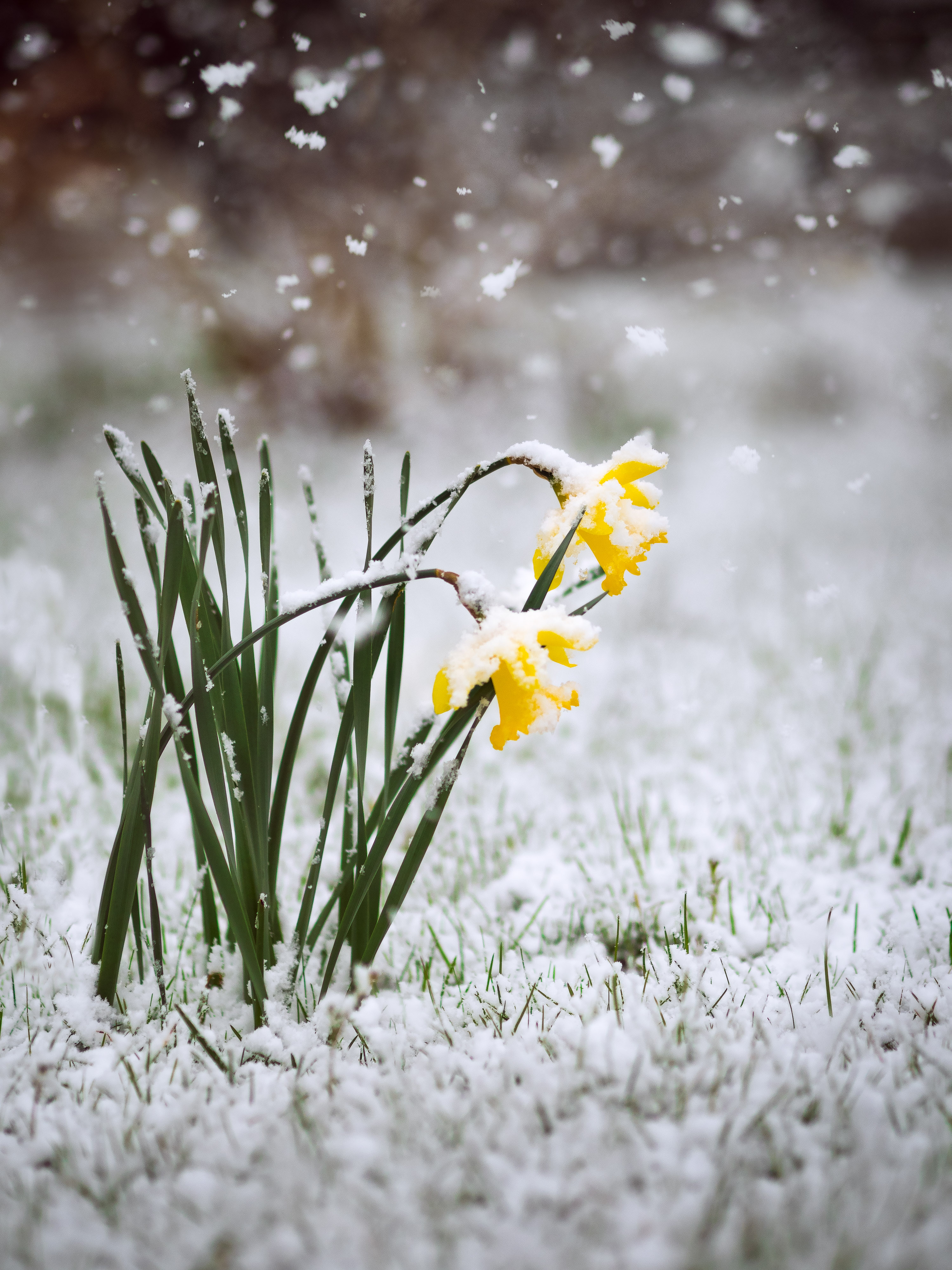
Spring and winter meeting

In rural England, the equivalent term is "blackthorn winter", so-called because the blackthorn in hedgerows blossoms in early April, preceding the leaves, and presents an intense white spray against the black branches of the bush. In Finland, where the phenomenon is incredibly common – even in the month of May – the expression to describe it "takatalvi" (lit: back winter; most likely from the word takaisin 'come back', as in "returning winter") is part of common parlance.

== In media ==
"Blackberry Winter" is the name of a frequently anthologized short story from 1946 by Robert Penn Warren. It is also the name of a song written by Edith Lindeman and Carl Stutz. This became a back-door million-seller as the B-side of Mitch Miller's recording of The Yellow Rose of Texas, a number 1 hit in the U.S. in 1955. It is also the name of a well-reviewed (if not major) classical/symphonic work by composer Conni Ellisor, and a well-reviewed ballet based on this composition. It is also the name of a song by Alec Wilder and Loonis McGlohon.

Blackberry Winter is also the title of the autobiography (1972) of anthropologist Margaret Mead.

== See also ==
- Indian summer
- Strawberry Spring

== Sources ==
- Millichap, Joseph R. 1992. Robert Penn Warren: A Study of the Short Fiction. Twayne Publishers, New York. Gordon Weaver, editor. ISBN 0-8057-8346-6
- Warren, Robert Penn. 1983. The Circus in the Attic and Other Stories. A Harvest Book, Harcourt Brace & Company, New York. ISBN 0-15-618002-2 (paperback).
