= The Unregenerate South =

1997 book by Mark G. Malvasi

- Author: Mark G. Malvasi
- Language: English
- Publisher: Louisiana State University Press
- Publication date: 1997
- Publication place: United States
- Pages: 261
- ISBN: 9780807121436

The Unregenerate South: Agrarian Thought of John Crowe Ransom, Allen Tate and Donald Davidson is a 1997 book by Mark G. Malvasi.

== Summary ==
The book surveys the social thought of the Southern American writers John Crowe Ransom, Allen Tate and Donald Davidson. They were associated with the English department at Vanderbilt University and participated in the short-lived Southern Agrarians movement, which in 1930 produced the manifesto I'll Take My Stand: The South and the Agrarian Tradition. Malvasi argues that the three writers expressed a cohesive "Southern conservative tradition", which existed before them and amounted to defending community, leisure and tradition against the perceived threats of bourgeois individualism, the rule of profit and progress.

== Reception ==
John Grammer wrote in the Mississippi Quarterly that the book is measured and thereby differs from much earlier material about the Southern Agrarians, which either is written out of loyalty or hostility. Joseph Persky wrote in The American Historical Review that Malvasi broadens the understanding of the social thought of its subjects, stressing the contrast between the rural culture they praised and the urban and academic milieus that shaped their own aesthetics, but wrote that "the whole remains a good deal less than the sum of the parts".
