= The Circus in the Attic and Other Stories =

- First edition cover
- Author: Robert Penn Warren
- Language: English
- Publisher: Harcourt Brace and Company
- Publication date: January 1947
- Publication place: United States
- Media type: Print (hardback)
- Pages: 276
- OCLC: 9489063

The Circus in the Attic and Other Stories is the only volume of short fiction by poet and novelist Robert Penn Warren. The collection, comprising two novellas and twelve short stories, was first published in 1947 by Harcourt Brace & Company.

Warren produced a relatively small body of short fiction compared to his poetry, novels and nonfiction work. The Circus in the Attic and Other Stories represents almost half of his entire oeuvre in the short story genre.

The collection includes perhaps Warren's most outstanding work of short fiction, "Blackberry Winter" (1946), both in its critical acclaim and the author's own assessment.

== Stories ==
The stories are listed as they appear in the 1947 collection, first edition. Dates and original publishers in periodicals are indicated. The two novellas ("The Circus in the Attic" and "Prime Leaf") were placed by Warren at the beginning and the end respectively, bracketing the short fiction cycle.

- "The Circus in the Attic" (Cosmopolitan, September 1947)
- "Blackberry Winter" (Cummington Press, 1946)
- "When the Light Gets Green" (Southern Review, Spring 1936)
- "Christmas Gift" (Virginia Quarterly Review, Winter 1937)
- "Goodwood Comes Back" (Southern Review, (Winter 1941)
- "The Patented Gate and the Mean Hamburger" (Mademoiselle, January 1947)
- "A Christian Education" (Mademoiselle, January 1945)
- "The Love of Elsie Barton: A Chronicle" (Mademoiselle, December 1946)
- "Testament of Flood" (Magazine [2], March–April 1935)
- "The Confession of Brother Grimes" (New English Review, June 1946)
- "Her Own People" (Virginia Quarterly Review, April 1935)
- "The Life and Work of Professor Roy Millen" (Mademoiselle, February 1943)
- "The Unvexed Isles" (Magazine [2], July–August 1934)
- "Prime Leaf" (American Caravan [4], 1931)

== Background ==
"[T]he central figures are almost exclusively southern males at various stages of development from childhood to old age. The important events in their lives become parallel elements of plot: initiation, isolation, failure, frustration and death."—Biographer Joseph R. Millichap in Robert Penn Warren: A Study of the Short Fiction (1992).

These works were written over a period of 15 years (1930-1946) when Warren was in his 20s and 30s.

Biographer Joseph R. Millichap notes that "Warren's production of the [short story] genre is limited by comparison to the other genre in his canon, and he clearly stopped writing short fiction as such relatively early in his career."

Most of Warren's post-1947 short stories—numbering around fifteen—were excerpted from material he was developing for his novels.

== Reception ==
Kirkus Reviews compares the stories favorably to Sherwood Anderson's Winesburg, Ohio (1919) and to Edgar Lee Masters' Spoon River Anthology (1915). The review summarizes the title story as "the dream life of a frustrated man whose one excursion into adventure in his boyhood, when he ran away to join a circus, is immortalized through his subsequent dull life, dominated by women, in the building of the circus in the attic."

Noting Warren's association with the agrarianism of the Fugitives of the New Criticism, literary critic Nathan Glick at Commentary (June 1948) writes:

Being imitative by design and nature, Warren's prose style partakes of the corruption it tries to represent. For all his susceptibility to the modern temper, Warren is at home only in the provincial world and in the indigenous rhetoric of that world: Southern oratory, biblical folk speech, and cultivated formality. Higgins, 1990 p. 3: "Robert Penn Warren may be described as a Southern, Fugitive, Agrarian New Critic."

== Critical appraisal ==
Literary critic Joseph R. Millichap observes that Warren's short fiction has been largely overlooked in comparison to the fulsome analysis afforded his work in poetry, novels and critical essays.

Despite Warren's success in producing a number of impressive short stories, his work in this literary genre is distinctly inferior, in quantity and quality, to his major works as a poet and novelist. Biographer Allen G. Shepherd reports that Warren never fully engaged with his short fiction: "The stories did not, for the most part, represent major efforts...more importantly, the form itself seems to have inhibited Warren's natural talents and inclinations." Shepherd adds that most of these early works are "surprisingly undistinguished" and attributes this to Warren's inexperience as a writer, and the fact that he often produced them for quick sale to the slicks.

Millichap writes that Warren himself "acknowledges only three or four of his short fictions as worthy of his efforts..."

Biographer Rudolph Runyon cites several critics who deem Warren's short fiction flawed in structure and contrived in plot, and reports that Warren considered the stories in The Circus in the Attic "a kind of accident," having sacrificed his poetic art in order to write his short fiction. Runyon has a much better opinion of the collection, and provides concise analysis of its contents.

Millichap regards the volume as episodic, thus generating its own synergy:

In all, the pieces in Warren's collection can each stand alone, but standing together the whole becomes more than the sum of the parts. The individual works cohere in patterns that enrich each other, creating in the process one of Warren's most interesting and important books.

== Theme ==
Millichap provides an insight into the thematic significance of the collection's title: "Warren's ideology involves the romance of southern history, and thus his intertextuality contrasts history and romance...The overall theme of the romance of southern history, metaphorically represented by the image of the circus in the attic, or imagination transforming memory, pervades the volume, as it does Warren's whole canon."

Millichap adds that "the romance of southern history is the major unifying theme of the entire collection..."

The theme of initiation is especially evident in the collection, exemplified in "Blackberry Winter", "When the Light Goes Green", and "Christmas Gift" - and also in "A Christian Education", "Testament of Flood", and "Prime Leaf".

All the male initiates in these stories coalesce in an Adamic figure, archetypal in some senses and biological in others, reminiscent of earlier American innocents such as Anderson's George Willard, Hemingway's Nick Adams, or Steinbeck's Jody Tiflin."

== Sources ==
- Kirkus Reviews. "Book Reviews: The Circus in the Attic" Kirkus Reviews. https://www.kirkusreviews.com/book-reviews/robert-penn-warren/circus-in-the-attic/AND OTHER STORIES Retrieved 25 February 2024.
- Glick, Nathan. 1948. "The Southern Temper: The Circus in the Attic and Other Stories by Robert Penn Warren" Commentary, June 1948. https://www.commentary.org/articles/nathan-glick/the-circus-in-the-attic-and-other-stories-by-robert-penn-warren/ Retrieved 23 February 2024.
- Higgins, Sara B. 1990. "Robert Penn Warren's Short Fiction: His Theory, His Stories, and His Critics" Florida Atlantic University, Boca Raton, Florida August 1990. https://fau.digital.flvc.org/islandora/object/fau%3A11422/datastream/OBJ/view/Robert_Penn_Warren_s_short_fiction__His_theory__his_stories__and_his_critics.pdf Retrieved 27 February 2024.
- Millichap, Joseph R. 1992. Robert Penn Warren: A Study of the Short Fiction. Twayne Publishers, ISBN 0-8057-8346-6
- Runyon, Randolph P. 1985. "The View From the Attic: Robert Penn Warren's Circus Stories" Mississippi Quarterly, Spring 1985 in Robert Penn Warren: A Study of the Short Fiction. pp. 117–132 Twayne Publishers, ISBN 0-8057-8346-6
- Shepherd, Allen G. 1979. "Prototype, Byblow and Reconception: Notes on the Relation of Warren's The Circus in the Attic to His Novels and Poetry" Mississippi Quarterly, Winter 1979-1980 in Robert Penn Warren: A Study of the Short Fiction. pp. 104–116 Twayne Publishers, ISBN 0-8057-8346-6
- Warren, Robert Penn. 1947. The Circus in the Attic and Other Stories. A Harvest Book, Harcourt Brace & Company, New York. Gordon Weaver, editor ISBN 0-15-618002-2 (paperback).
