= The Red Headed Stranger =

Studio album by Carla Bozulich
- Released: September 23, 2003
- Recorded: May 7, 2002–October 2, 2002
- Genre: Country
- Label: DiCristina Stair Builders, Folktale

Carla Bozulich chronology
The Red Headed Stranger (2003)	I'm Gonna Stop Killing (2004)

The Red Headed Stranger is an interpretation by Carla Bozulich of Willie Nelson's 1975 multi-platinum album Red Headed Stranger, released digitally and on CD by DiCristina Stair Builders in 2003. Nelson appears on three tracks. In 2016, the album was released as a remastered, double vinyl record by Folktale Records.

== History ==
In making her first solo album, Bozulich didn't want "the pressure of having to write all new music. "I'm a storyteller, and it's a folktale, and I felt like I wanted to bring that tradition to life. I started doing it with a drone box and guitar, but quickly Nels [Cline] got involved and helped me realize some of my ideas, and then his group the Nels Cline Singers jumped in." Jenny Scheinman was added as one of the clarifying members during the recording session, playing the violin and adding vocals. There are also backing vocals by Carla's big sister, Leah Bozulich on the song, "Blue Eyes Cryin' In The Rain". Carla has stated that the addition of an electronic tambura drone box and the melding of Middle Eastern melodies with traditional country parts was a re-action to the US invasion of Iraq after 9/11, as the group was preparing to record. The first performance of Carla's Red Headed Stranger was in 2002 at the Los Angeles club, The Smell. Alan Sparhawk from Low showed up knowing the whole album by heart and proceeded to sit in on the entire fledgling performance.

== Reception ==
Professional ratings
Review scores
Source	Rating
Allmusic	4.5/5 stars
San Francisco Chronicle	(no rating)
Indie Workshop	(no rating)

In his review for Allmusic music critic Thom Jurek praised the album, stating Bozulich "has really accomplished something here, taking a classic work of true Americana and making it her own, no less mythological, no less transcendent, and yet ultimately something wholly new and embracing. Bozulich understands implicitly: legend is for extrapolation, and ultimately for re-visioning in a new place and time. As downtrodden and spiritually haunting as its predecessor, this new Red Headed Stranger is vital and necessary..."

Derk Richardson of SFGate called the album a masterpiece, comparing it to the original as "recast [it], song by song, in her own brooding image." Stephanie Haselman of Indie Workshop wrote, "It's the moments when Bozulich, Cline and company stray farthest from the album's country roots that it's the most amazing and brilliant."

== Track listing ==
1. "Time of the Preacher" (Willie Nelson) – 2:56
2. "I Couldn't Believe It Was True" (Eddy Arnold, Wally Fowler) – 2:26
3. "Medley: Time of the Preacher/Blue Rock Montana/Red Headed Stranger" (Nelson, Edith Lindeman, Carl Stutz) – 6:42
4. "Blue Eyes Crying in the Rain" (Fred Rose) – 3:35
5. "Red Headed Stranger" (Lindeman, Stutz) – 10:47
6. "Time of the Preacher Theme" (Nelson) – :32
7. "Just as I Am" (Traditional) – 5:34
8. "Denver/O'er the Waves" (Nelson) – 4:06
9. "Down Yonder" (L. Wolfe Gilbert) – 1:16
10. "Can I Sleep in Your Arms?" (Hank Cochran) – 4:22
11. "Remember Me" (T. Texas Tyler) – 6:29
12. "Hands on the Wheel" (Bill Callery) – 3:59
13. "Bandera" (Nelson) – 4:05
14. "Lonesome Roads" (Bozulich) – 4:16 [vinyl only]

== Personnel ==
- Carla Bozulich – vocals, autoharp, guitar
- Nels Cline – guitar, lap steel guitar
- Willie Nelson – vocals, guitar
- Scott Amendola – percussion, drums
- Jenny Scheinman – violin, vocal harmony
- Leah Bozulich - vocal harmony

Production notes:

- Scott Fraser – engineer
- Larry Greenhill – engineer
- Carla Bozulich – mixing
- Biff Sanders – mixing
