= Red Headed Stranger =

Studio album by Willie Nelson
- Released: May 1975
- Recorded: January 1975
- Studio: Autumn Sound (Garland, Texas)
- Genres: Country; outlaw country
- Length: 33:30
- Label: Columbia
- Producer: Willie Nelson

Willie Nelson chronology
Phases and Stages (1974)	Red Headed Stranger (1975)	The Sound in Your Mind (1976)

Singles from Red Headed Stranger
- 1. "Blue Eyes Crying in the Rain" Released: 1975; 2. "Remember Me" Released: 1976

Red Headed Stranger is the eighteenth studio album by American outlaw country singer Willie Nelson, released in 1975. Following the success of his recordings with Atlantic Records, coupled with the negotiating skills of his manager, Neil Reshen, Nelson signed a contract with Columbia Records, the label that gave him total creative control over his works. The concept for the album was inspired by the "Tale of the Red Headed Stranger", a song that Nelson used to play as a disc jockey on his program in Fort Worth, Texas. After signing with Columbia, he decided to record the song, and arranged the details during his return to Austin, Texas, from a trip to Colorado. It was recorded at low cost at Autumn Sound Studios in Garland, Texas.

The songs featured sparse arrangements, largely limited to Nelson's guitar, piano, and drums. Nelson presented the finished material to Columbia executives, who were dubious about releasing an album that they at first thought was a demo. However, Nelson had creative control, so no further production was added.

A concept album, Red Headed Stranger is about a fugitive on the run from the law after killing his wife and her lover. The content consists of songs with brief poetic lyrics and arrangements of older material such as Fred Rose's "Blue Eyes Crying in the Rain", Wolfe Gilbert's "Down Yonder", and Juventino Rosas' "O'er the Waves". Despite Columbia's doubts and the limited instrumentation, Red Headed Stranger was a blockbuster among country music and mainstream audiences. It was certified multiple-platinum, and made Nelson one of the most recognized artists in country music. The cover of "Blue Eyes Crying in the Rain", released as a single before the album, became Nelson's first number-one hit. The title of the album became a lasting nickname for Nelson. It was ranked number 183 on Rolling Stone's list of the 500 Greatest Albums of All Time, and number one on CMT's 40 Greatest Albums in Country Music. In 2010, it was inducted to the National Recording Registry.

In 1986, Nelson starred as the Red Headed Stranger in a movie of the same name, based on the story of the album. The album has had a strong cultural impact; the song "Time of the Preacher" was used often in the British television miniseries Edge of Darkness, and its lyrics were used in the first issue of the comic Preacher.

== Background ==
Nelson first achieved fame as a songwriter in Nashville after writing hits such as "Hello Walls", "Night Life", "Funny How Time Slips Away", "Pretty Paper", and "Crazy". After recording two albums for Liberty, he moved to RCA and recorded over a dozen albums, many produced by Chet Atkins, but his recordings were given the Nashville Sound treatment, orchestration that Nelson felt was largely unnecessary. In 1973, he signed to Atlantic Records by Jerry Wexler, who accepted Nelson's desire to use his own band in the studio and eschew commercial concerns, for US$25,000 per year, he became the first country artist signed by the label. His first album with Atlantic was the critically acclaimed Shotgun Willie, which was followed by one of the first concept albums in country music, Phases and Stages. Following the success of these recordings, Nelson signed with Columbia Records, and was given complete creative control.

During his return to Austin, Texas, after a ski trip in Colorado, Nelson was inspired by his then-wife Connie Koepke to write a western concept album. Koepke suggested the inclusion of Arthur "Guitar Boogie" Smith's "Tale of the Red Headed Stranger", which Nelson sang during his radio shows on KCNC in Fort Worth, Texas, and previously, to his children at bedtime. Nelson decided to write a complete story that included details of events before the ones described in the song. As he spontaneously composed the songs, Koepke recorded the lyrics. With his original writings, Nelson included in the story, Fred Rose's "Blue Eyes Crying in the Rain", Wolfe Gilbert's "Down Yonder", Juventino Rosas' "Sobre las Olas (O'er the Waves)", Hank Cochran's "Can I Sleep in Your Arms?", Eddy Arnold's "I Couldn't Believe It Was True", and Billy Callery's "Hands on the Wheel". When he arrived in Austin, Nelson recorded a demo of the songs on a tape recorder accompanied with his guitar at his ranch on Fitzhugh Road.

== Recording and composition ==
Nelson started to look for a studio in Texas to record his new material to avoid the modifications that they did to his recordings in his previous sessions. Engineer Phil York, who was hired freelance by the recently opened Autumn Sound Studios in Garland, Texas, heard about his need. York, an acquaintance of Nelson's harmonicist Mickey Raphael, offered Nelson a day of free recording to boost the popularity of the studio. Autumn's studio, a quiet room with cypress wood paneling, featured the first 24-track studio console in Texas, and came equipped with a Bosendorfer concert grand piano, a 92-key instrument made in Vienna with four extra bass notes that retailed for $25,000. Nelson and his band went to the trial session during January, and recorded five songs. Later, Raphael called back York, announcing that Nelson would record the entire album there. After hearing the tapes by Nelson, the band started to improvise to the song "Blue Eyes Crying in the Rain". Disliking the result, Nelson decided to strip down the instrumentation. Nelson also instructed York to undo the equalization he performed on the tracks, remarking that it was the method his producers used in Nashville. The recording took five days, with an additional day for the mixing, that summed up to US$4,000 in studio costs. The additional costs took the total to US$20,000. Nelson featured arrangements of acoustic guitar, accompanied by piano, played by his sister Bobbie, as well complementary arrangements of drums, harmonica, and mandolin.

"Time of the Preacher"
This song introduces the story, and is interwoven through the storyline as it develops.

"Blue Eyes Crying in the Rain"
A 1947 standard by Fred Rose; in the context of the story, it is used to depict the man's grief over the death of his wife. The single was a hit for Nelson, and was one of the reasons for the album's success.

"Red Headed Stranger"
The album's title song marks the start of the journey of the fugitive husband, and his second murder.

The title track of the album was written by Edith Lindeman Calisch and Carl Stutz, and made popular by Arthur "Guitar Boogie" Smith. It had previously had been recorded by John D. Loudermilk and Eddy Arnold. While the album initially was inspired by "The Tale of the Red Headed Stranger", Nelson later insisted the story came together quickly after he penned the opening track "Time of the Preacher": "I took my time, all the while staying focused on the preacher's feelings ... Hank Cochran's 'Can I Sleep in Your Arms' was the kind of tune the preacher would use to sing himself to sleep. I could also hear the preacher doing a beautiful old ballad by Fred Rose, 'Blue Eyes Crying in the Rain', that had been sung by everyone from Hank Williams to Gene Autry to Conway Twitty. It was another song about lost love whose mantra – 'Love is like a dying ember and only memories remain' – expressed the overall theme and tied all the loose ends together". Author Michael Streissguth considered it Nelson's "first true concept album", composed of new songs and old, arranged in a sequence that formed a story. In Chet Flippo's essay for the 2000 reissue of the album, Nelson commented "I wanted it to be real sparse. I had in mind, I remember, some of my favorite records: Eddy Arnold with just his guitar; Ernest Tubb with just his guitar; so I wanted to have that kind of feel with maybe just some help along the way to keep it from getting too, you know, obnoxious. Or monotonous."

The story begins with "Time of the Preacher", where the character evokes his love for his wife, whom he suspects is unfaithful. In the following song, "I Couldn't Believe It Was True", the infidelity is revealed. This leads to a short version of "Time of the Preacher", wherein the singer ends with the line "Now the lesson is over, and the killing's begun". The reaction of the husband is depicted by Nelson in a medley of "Blue Rock, Montana" and "Red Headed Stranger". The first song describes the double murder of the unfaithful woman and her lover by the Stranger, who states, "And they died with a smile on their faces". This leads to the second song of the medley, which describes the grief of the Stranger. This section is followed by Nelson's cover of the 1947 Fred Rose song "Blue Eyes Crying in the Rain", where the fugitive laments the loss of his wife. In "Red Headed Stranger", the protagonist commits a subsequent murder—he kills a woman who merely reaches out to touch one of his horses. The horse "means more to him than life" because it had belonged to his wife, but the Stranger goes free because it was determined that "you can't hang a man for killin' a woman who's tryin' to steal your horse".

The story continues with the Stranger traveling south. In the song "Denver", the character falls in love with a woman he meets in a bar in town. One of the lines from "Blue Rock, Montana" is repeated, with a variation: "And they danced with a smile on their faces". The following song "Can I Sleep in Your Arms?" shows the Stranger's desire for redemption and love. Next is "Remember Me", where he announces that his vows to his deceased wife are broken and he is free to love. The story ends with "Hands on the Wheel", which depicts the Stranger as an old man who is accompanied by a child, presumably his grandson, and his new love. The song marks the end of the sorrow of the Stranger, and his redemption years later. The album ends with the instrumental song "Bandera".

== Release and reception ==
Initially, Columbia Records was not satisfied with the finished product; the sparsely instrumented acoustic arrangements caused the label's directors to doubt releasing the album as presented, feeling it was under-produced and no more than a demo. Nelson later remembered that "when the chief Columbia bigwig heard the tracks, he said, 'Why are you turning in a demo?' 'Ain't no demo', I explained. 'This is the finished product.'" When Nelson asked the Columbia executive what a finished record was supposed to sound like, the executive replied "Anything but this. The songs feel disconnected. The mood is too down. And the sound is far too flat. You need to go back in and polish it." Nelson's manager Neil Reshen and Waylon Jennings then traveled to New York City to play the album for Columbia president Bruce Lundvall. Lundvall had suggested that the album be sent to Nashville producer Billy Sherrill for further overdubbing. An infuriated Jennings called Lundvall a "tone-deaf, tin-eared sonofabitch". When he first heard it, Sherrill asked, "Did he make this in his living room? It's a piece of shit! It sounds like he did this for about two bucks. It's not produced." However, Nelson had complete creative control, and it was released without any further modifications. Reflecting on the album's success, Columbia executive Rick Blackburn later commented "Red Headed Stranger was a hit for all the wrong reasons. It didn't follow the formula, the fashionable mix of the day. There were 1,000 reasons that record should not be a hit. But the Red Headed Stranger project took on Willie's personality and became a hit for the right reasons – because it was Willie Nelson. It was Willie's statement."

Red Headed Stranger reached number one on the Billboard chart for Top Country Albums, and number 28 during a 43-week stay in the Top LPs & Tapes chart. On March 11, 1976, it was certified gold by the Recording Industry Association of America, and on November 21, 1986, it was certified double-platinum.

=== Original reviews ===
Professional ratings
Review scores
Source	Rating
Robert Christgau	B−

Rolling Stone writer Paul Nelson considered "Red Headed Stranger "extraordinarily ambitious, cool, tightly controlled". The reviewer remarked that the album "ties precise, evocative lyrics", and called the result "haunting yet utterly unsentimental"." Meanwhile, critic Robert Christgau wrote, "Some of the individual pieces are quite nice, but the gestalt is the concept album at its most counterproductive—the lyrics render the nostalgic instrumental parts unnecessarily ironic and lose additional charm in narrative context."

Music critic Chet Flippo wrote an article in Texas Monthly that was titled "Mathew, Mark, Luke and Willie: Willie Nelson's latest album is more than a good country music; it's almost Gospel": "The difference between Nelson's Red Headed Stranger and any current C&W album, and especially what passes for a soundtrack for Nashville, is astounding. What Nelson has done is simply unclassifiable; it is the only record I have heard that strikes me as otherworldly. Red Headed Stranger conjures up such strange emotions and works on so many levels that listening to it becomes totally obsessing". Billboard described the album as "lots of instrumental work, with particularly fine piano by Bobbie Nelson, and the usual highly stylized Willie Nelson vocals". In Mother Jones Joe Nick Patoski wrote: "Texans have known for 15 years what Red Headed Stranger finally revealed to the world – that Nelson is simply too brilliant a songwriter, interpreter, and singer – just too damn universal – to be defined as merely a country artist".

The Fort Worth Star-Telegram noted the use of Nelson's usual backing band instead of session musicians. The review praised Mickey Raphael's playing on "Hands on the Wheel" and Bobbie Nelson's on "Bandera", while it also remarked that the style of the album reflected "the Nelson of several years ago" with its "aura of quiet intensity". John Edminston, from The Paris News, declared: "Red Headed Stranger, if nothing else, will bring Willie to the forefront as one of the nation's top country-western recording artists. And that's where he belongs".

== Legacy ==
Red Headed Stranger's critical success cemented Nelson's outlaw image, and made him one of the most recognized artists in country music. The title of the album became a nickname for Nelson. The cover of Fred Rose's 1945 song "Blue Eyes Crying in the Rain", that had been released as a single previous to the album, became his first number one hit as a singer.

Nelson met publisher and screenwriter William D. Wittliff in 1977 at a Mexican restaurant in Austin through writer Bud Shrake. Because of the success of the album, Wittliff decided to write a script for Nelson based on the story of the Red Headed Stranger. In 1979, Wittliff finished a draft of the project, which was turned over to Universal Studios. The studio budgeted the film at $14 million and sent the script to Robert Redford, who turned it down. The movie project was tabled, and Wittliff and Nelson had to buy the script back from Universal. The script then went to HBO, who assigned the project a budget of $5 million, but this project was not completed either. Finally, Nelson and Wittliff decided to finance the film themselves. In Red Headed Stranger, Nelson portrayed the role of the stranger, and the movie was released in 1986.

In 2002, the 1975 original recording of the album was inducted into the Grammy Hall of Fame.

In 2000, Red Headed Stranger was reissued on CD. The new released included the bonus tracks "Bach Minuet In G", "I Can't Help It (If I'm Still In Love With You)", "A Maiden's Prayer" and "Bonaparte's Retreat". In 2003, the album was ranked at number 184 on Rolling Stone's list of the 500 Greatest Albums of All Time, maintaining the rating in a 2012 revised list, before dropping to number 237 in a 2020 revised list. In 2006, it was ranked number one in Country Music Television's 40 Greatest Albums in Country Music. In 2009, Red Headed Stranger was added to the National Recording Registry as it was considered that it was "culturally, historically, or aesthetically important, and/or informs or reflects life in the United States". In 2020, Legacy Recordings reissued Red Headed Stranger on its original LP format.

=== Retrospective appraisal ===
Professional ratings
Review scores
Source	Rating
AllMusic	5/5 stars
The Encyclopedia of Popular Music	5/5 stars
Pitchfork	9.3/10
Sputnikmusic	4.5/5 stars
Zagat Survey	5/5 stars

In 1996, Nell Zink wrote in CMJ New Music Monthly: "His Red Headed Stranger was the Sgt. Pepper's of country music, the first record to follow a coherent theme instead of merely compiling radio singles". Stephen Thomas Erlewine in AllMusic described Red Headed Stranger as "really elusive, as the themes get a little muddled and the tunes themselves are a bit bare. It's undoubtedly distinctive – and it sounds more distinctive with each passing year – but it's strictly an intellectual triumph and, after a pair of albums that were musically and intellectually sound, it's a bit of a letdown, no matter how successful it was". In 2003, it was included among the top 1,000 albums of Zagat Survey magazine, and was rated five stars out of five. The magazine wrote "Supporters (of the album) spread the gospel that it's 'not just a quintessential outlaw recording' but 'perhaps the greatest country album ever' with a 'spare' style that 'changed the way C&W was played'."

Sputnikmusic wrote: "The Red Headed Stranger is simple and bare. Following the story of a preacher man that kills his cheating wife and her lover, ol' Willie spins the tale with a laid back nonchalance that just seems to ooze out of him, his aching chords and somber melodies encapsulating the futility and pain of his character's situation [...] The Red Headed Stranger is timeless. Willie Nelson's captivating story telling, and the minimalist majesty of his music fills a well worn grove in the hearts of those that enjoy the folk roots of the United States." Writing for Pitchfork, Rebecca Bengal deemed it "a big and beautiful dream made real by simple and spare music", noting Nelson's "uncanny ability to bend the listener’s perception of time". The Encyclopedia of Popular Music defined it as a "country classic"

=== In popular culture ===
The first track, "Time of the Preacher", was used in Bob Dylan's 1978 film Renaldo and Clara and episodes of the 1985 television drama Edge of Darkness. The lyrics to "Time of the Preacher" were used in the opening pages of the first issue of the Vertigo comic book Preacher, with the song being used in the opening of the premiere of the TV series based on the comic. A 2002 episode of the TV series Monk, "Mr. Monk and the Red-Headed Stranger", guest-stars Willie Nelson. In the episode, Nelson is accused of murder. The complete album was performed and recorded by Carla Bozulich in 2003. The Red Headed Stranger included a guest appearance by Nelson. The song "Hands on the Wheel" was played during the closing scenes of the 2025 documentary Earnhardt.

== Track listing ==
=== Original release ===
Side one
No.	Title	Writer(s)	Length
1.	"Time of the Preacher"	Willie Nelson	2:26
2.	"I Couldn't Believe It Was True"	Eddy Arnold, Wally Fowler	1:32
3.	"Time of the Preacher Theme"	Nelson	1:13
4.	"Blue Rock Montana" / "Red Headed Stranger" (medley)	Nelson / Carl Stutz, Edith Lindeman	1:36
5.	"Blue Eyes Crying in the Rain"	Fred Rose	2:18
6.	"Red Headed Stranger"	Carl Stutz, Lindeman	4:00
7.	"Time of the Preacher Theme"	Nelson	0:25
8.	"Just As I Am"	Charlotte Elliott, William B. Bradbury	1:45

Side two
No.	Title	Writer(s)	Length
1.	"Denver"	Nelson	0:53
2.	"O'er the Waves"	Juventino Rosas, arranged by Willie Nelson	0:47
3.	"Down Yonder" (played by Bobbie Nelson)	L. Wolfe Gilbert	1:56
4.	"Can I Sleep in Your Arms"	Hank Cochran	5:24
5.	"Remember Me (When the Candle Lights Are Gleaming)"	Scotty Wiseman	2:52
6.	"Hands on the Wheel"	Bill Callery	4:22
7.	"Bandera"	Nelson	2:19

=== Reissue (2000) ===
Track 1-15 were from the original release
No.	Title	Writer(s)	Length
16.	"Bach Minuet in G"	Christian Petzold; arranged by Willie Nelson, falsely attributed to Johann Sebastian Bach	0:37
17.	"I Can't Help It (If I'm Still in Love with You)"	Hank Williams	3:31
18.	"A Maiden's Prayer"	Tekla Bądarzewska-Baranowska, Bob Wills	2:14
19.	"Bonaparte's Retreat"	Pee Wee King, Redd Stewart	2:26

== Personnel ==
Musicians

- Willie Nelson – vocals, Trigger (guitar)
- Paul English – drums
- Jody Payne – guitars, mandolin
- Bee Spears – bass
- Bobbie Nelson – piano
- Mickey Raphael – harmonica
- Bucky Meadows – guitar
- Billy English – drums

Production

- Willie Nelson – producer
- Chet Flippo – liner notes
- Howard Fritzson – art direction
- Monica White – artwork
- Joseph M. Palmaccio – mastering
- Don Hunstein, David Gahr – photography
- Phil York, Eric Paul – engineers
- John Jackson – product manager

== Charts ==
=== Weekly charts ===
Weekly chart performance of Red Headed Stranger
Chart (1975)	Peak position
US Billboard 200	28
US Top Country Albums (Billboard)	1

=== Year-end charts ===
Year-end chart performance of Red Headed Stranger
Chart (1975)	Position
US Top Country Albums (Billboard)	14

=== Singles ===
Sales chart performance of singles from Red Headed Stranger
Year	Song	Chart	Peak position
1975	"Blue Eyes Crying in the Rain"	US Hot Country Songs (Billboard)	1
1975	"Blue Eyes Crying in the Rain"	US Billboard Hot 100	21
1976	"Remember Me"	US Hot Country Songs (Billboard)	2
1976	"Remember Me"	US Billboard Hot 100	67
