= Blue Eyes Crying in the Rain =

Song written by Fred Rose

Single by Roy Acuff
- B-side: "The Devil's Train"
- Released: October 1947
- Genre: Country
- Label: Columbia
- Songwriter: Fred Rose

"Blue Eyes Crying in the Rain"

Single by Willie Nelson

from the album Red Headed Stranger
- B-side: "Bandera"
- Released: July 1975
- Recorded: February 9–12, 1975
- Genre: Country
- Length: 2:18
- Label: Columbia
- Songwriter: Fred Rose
- Producer: Willie Nelson

Willie Nelson singles chronology
"Sister's Coming Home" (1974)	"Blue Eyes Crying in the Rain" (1975)	"Fire and Rain" (1976)

Music video
- "Blue Eyes Crying In The Rain" on YouTube

"Blue Eyes Crying in the Rain" is a song written by songwriter Fred Rose. First recorded by Elton Britt in early 1947, then made more popular by Roy Acuff later that year, the song has been covered by many artists, including Hank Williams Sr., Johnny Russell, Charley Pride, and Elvis Presley. Most notably, the song was recorded by Willie Nelson as part of his 1975 album Red Headed Stranger. Both the song and album revived Nelson's success as a singer and recording artist.

== Background ==
Originally recorded in 1947 by Acuff, "Blue Eyes Crying in the Rain" was recorded by Hank Williams in 1951 for the Mother's Best Flour Hour. Other early remakes of the song were made by Donn Reynolds (MGM single - June 1957), Ferlin Husky (album Ferlin's Favorites - November 1959), Slim Whitman (album Country Favorites - 1959), Gene Vincent (recorded October 15, 1958; album Crazy Times! -1960), Bill Anderson (album ...Sings Country Heart Songs - January 15, 1962), John D. Loudermilk (album Country Love Songs Plain and Simply Sung - August 1968), Hank Snow (album Greatest Hits) and Conway Twitty (album Hello Darlin' - June 1970).

The version by Willie Nelson, recorded for his 1975 concept album Red Headed Stranger, which was about a fugitive preacher on the run from the law after killing his wife, was lauded by country music historian Bill Malone as "a fine example of clean, uncluttered country music, [with] a spare arrangement that could have come straight out of the 1940s." Rolling Stone noted the song was delivered with his "jazz-style phrasing" and was "the beating heart of Red Headed Stranger."

A music video for the song was created in 1986 to promote the motion picture adaptation of the album.

== Reception and legacy ==
Before the success of "Blue Eyes Crying in the Rain," Nelson had enjoyed widespread success primarily as a songwriter, with such songs as "Crazy" (Patsy Cline) and "Hello Walls" (Faron Young). As a performer, meanwhile, Nelson had hit the top 10 of the Billboard magazine Hot Country Singles chart just twice; it had happened in 1962, once as a solo artist ("Touch Me") and again as part of a duet with Shirley Collie ("Willingly"). Thereafter, Nelson had approached the top 20 on occasion, but went 13 years without a top 10 hit.

In October 1975, the song became Nelson's first No. 1 hit as a singer, and at year's end, was the third-biggest song of 1975 on the Billboard Hot Country Singles chart. In addition, the song gained airplay on Top 40 radio, reaching No. 21 on the Billboard Hot 100.

In 1975, at the 18th Annual Grammy Awards, "Blue Eyes Crying in the Rain" won Willie a Grammy for Best Country Vocal Performance, Male. It was his first Grammy out of twelve he would go on to win.

In 2004, Rolling Stone ranked "Blue Eyes Crying in the Rain" No. 302 on its list of the 500 Greatest Songs of All Time. Rolling Stone also ranked "Blue Eyes Crying in the Rain" No. 48 on its list of the 100 Greatest Country Songs of All Time in June 2014. The publication later ranked the song at No. 27 on its 200 Greatest Country Songs of All Time list in May 2024.

== Chart performance ==
Chart (1975)	Peak position
US Hot Country Songs (Billboard)	1
US Billboard Hot 100	21
Canadian RPM Country Tracks	2
Canadian RPM Top Singles	40
Canadian RPM Adult Contemporary Tracks	9
Australian Kent Music Report	57

== Later versions ==
- Elvis Presley recorded "Blue Eyes Crying in the Rain" (having sung it privately with friends and family for years while accompanying himself on piano) in the Jungle Room at Graceland on February 7, 1976. This was the last known song that Elvis Presley sang (at the piano in the rest area of his racquetball court located to the rear of Graceland) before his death on August 16, 1977.
- Maria Tyl's version reached No. 7 in South Africa in 1981.
- A live version by Willie Nelson and Shania Twain was included on Nelson's 2003 live album Live & Kickin': Willie Nelson and Friends.
