= Butch (album) =

Studio album by The Geraldine Fibbers
- Released: July 1, 1997
- Recorded: December 1996
- Studio: The Sound Factory, Los Angeles
- Genre: Alternative country, alternative rock, punk rock
- Length: 50:49
- Label: Virgin
- Producer: Steve Fisk, The Geraldine Fibbers

The Geraldine Fibbers chronology
What Part of Get Thee Gone Don't You Understand? (1997)	Butch (1997)

Singles from Butch
- 1. "California Tuffy" Released: June 1997

Professional ratings
Review scores
Source	Rating
AllMusic	3/5 stars
The Austin Chronicle	4/5 stars
Chicago Tribune	2.5/4 stars
Entertainment Weekly	B+
Los Angeles Times	3.5/4 stars
NME	7/10
Pitchfork	8.5/10
Rolling Stone	3.5/5 stars
Spin	9/10

Butch is the second and final studio album by American alternative country band The Geraldine Fibbers. It was released on July 1, 1997.

The album was recorded in December 1996 by John Goodmanson at The Sound Factory studios, in Los Angeles, California. The recording was mixed March–April 1997 at Brooklyn Recording, Los Angeles by Sally Browder assisted by Ronnie Rivera.

"California Tuffy" was released as a promotional music video and single. In the music video, Carla Bozulich uses a black cat puppet to lip synch the song while she and the band destroy furniture and set things on fire.

Spin magazine named Butch to their best albums of 1997 list.

== Track listing ==
No.	Title	Writer(s)	Length
1.	"California Tuffy"	Carla Bozulich	3:17
2.	"Toybox"	Bozulich, William Tutton, Kevin Fitzgerald, Daniel Keenan	3:11
3.	"I Killed the Cuckoo"	Bozulich, Fitzgerald, Tutton	2:10
4.	"Trashman in Furs"	Bozulich, Tutton, Jessy Greene	3:43
5.	"Swim Back to Me"	Bozulich, Fitzgerald	3:25
6.	"Seven or in 10"	Bozulich, Nels Cline	2:26
7.	"Claudine"	The Geraldine Fibbers	2:19
8.	"Folks Like Me"	Bozulich	3:30
9.	"Pet Angel"	Bozulich, Tutton, Greene	3:39
10.	"Butch"	Bozulich, Cline	6:09
11.	"Arrow to My Drunken Eye"	Bozulich, Greene	6:32
12.	"You Doo Right" (Can cover)	Can	5:20
13.	"The Dwarf Song"	Bozulich	5:12
14.	"Heliotrope"	Bozulich	6:11

== Personnel ==
The Geraldine Fibbers

- Carla Bozulich – vocals, electric guitar, acoustic guitar, piano, music box, glockenspiel, loops
- Nels Cline – guitar electric, 12 string guitar, slide guitar, bass guitar, calliope, organ
- Kevin Fitzgerald – drums, percussion, glockenspiel, vocals
- Jessy Greene – viola, violin, vocals
- William Tutton – acoustic bass, electric bass, cello, piano

Additional musicians

- Steve Fisk – celeste, optigan
