= Hebrew Sabbath-School Union of America =

- Formation: July 29, 1886; 139 years ago
- Type: Jewish educational organization
- Headquarters: Cincinnati, Ohio
- Region served: United States
- Parent organization: Union of American Hebrew Congregations

The Hebrew Sabbath-School Union of America was a national Jewish educational organization founded in 1886 in Cincinnati, Ohio, affiliated with the Union of American Hebrew Congregations. It aimed to establish a standardized system of instruction for Hebrew schools across the United States and to train qualified teachers.

== History and activities ==
The Hebrew Sabbath-School Union was founded in July 1886 to emulate the successes of the American Sunday School Union. The organization represented the first effort to unify Jewish religious education in the United States.

The Union received financial support from the Reform Union of American Hebrew Congregations and held biennial meetings concurrently with that organization. Its headquarters were located in Cincinnati. The presidents of the Union included M. Loth, S. M. Winkler, Moses Mielziner, and David Philipson. As of 1903, ninety schools were affiliated with the Union.

It placed particular emphasis on publishing textbooks for use in religious schools. Among its notable publications were:

- School Edition of the Book of Proverbs (1890), by Adolph Moses and Isaac S. Moses.
- The Ethics of the Hebrew Scriptures (1889), by the same authors.
- Selections from the Psalms (1888), by Moses Mielziner.
- How to Organize a Sabbath-School, by Henry Berkowitz.
- Guide for Jewish Sabbath-School Teachers, which included contributions from Kaufmann Kohler (Biblical history), B. Felsenthal (post-Biblical history), David Philipson (religio-moral instruction), and Edward N. Calisch (Biblical history for primary classes).

The Union introduced a system of instructional leaflets and issued three series on Biblical history and one series on religious topics. These subjects included themes such as "The Love of God," "Our Love for God," "Love and Respect for Parents," and "Truth-Speaking." In 1898, the organization published a curriculum for Hebrew schools.
