= Ben Is Dead =

Los Angeles-based zine

- Editor: Deborah "Darby" Romeo
- First issue: 1988
- Final issue: 1999
- Country: United States
- Based in: Los Angeles
- Language: English
- OCLC: 26782693

Ben Is Dead was a Los Angeles–based zine published from 1988 through 1999. Its creator, Deborah "Darby" Romeo, got its name from a dream she had about her husband Ben, a Frenchman she divorced not long into the magazine's run. Romeo would later write that during the magazine's early days Ben found the title amusing, and would introduce himself to people as "Ben, from Ben is Dead."

== Beginnings ==
The magazine began as a photocopied publication featuring interviews with punk and "alternative" rock bands of the era (including then up-and-comers as Ethyl Meatplow, Nirvana and Hole) alongside the confessional and often shocking writing of Romeo, editors Mikki Halpin and Kerin Morataya, and her many contributors (which included colorful personalities Vaginal Davis, Ron Athey and Lisa Crystal Carver). Starting with issue 10 ("Mother"), each issue had an overall theme ("Revenge," "Obsessions and Bad Habits," "Sex," etc.) which the zine's writers would explore in exhaustive detail, freely recounting their own suicide attempts, kinky sexual adventures, addictions or family horror stories. The zine gradually became much more slick-looking and featured interviews with mainstream acts as Tom Jones, "Weird Al" Yankovic and Duran Duran alongside underground notables like William S. Burroughs, Johnny Rotten and Anton LaVey. Eventually Ben Is Dead had a circulation in the tens of thousands and was being sold in Borders and Tower Records across the United States.

== Evolution ==
As the zine continued, its tone became increasingly erratic as Romeo mixed the dark, confessional material with more light-hearted pop culture commentary, including articles about her fascination with Beverly Hills, 90210. Romeo's 90210 obsession eventually resulted in her and Morataya creating The I Hate Brenda Newsletter, a one-shot publication which was widely covered by the mainstream press. They also co-wrote the 1993 Pinnacle publication, The 'I Hate Brenda' Book and even formed their own band, Rump, which released a novelty compact disc entitled Hating Brenda.

In the mid to late 1990s, Romeo was often interviewed by the mainstream media, serving as a rather ambivalent spokesperson for the zine movement; she once joked that unless she found a way to make her zine pay off, she was soon going to be doing CNN interviews from a cardboard box. Romeo was constantly embroiled in feuds with other zinesters, and her last known publishing project was Socially Fucking Retarded, a 2000 one-shot zine chronicling the KillZine tour she went on with various other zinesters and the controversies along the way.

Romeo regularly interviewed her cantankerous father in Ben Is Dead, and in one interview she told him she couldn't imagine publishing a zine after she turned 30. And indeed, not long into her 30s, Romeo announced she was ceasing publication. The last issue of Ben is Dead featured the theme of "Celebrity." Actor/artist/noted eccentric Crispin Glover appeared on the cover and was the subject of a lengthy and very peculiar interview.

== Today ==
While the zine evolved quite a bit over the years, some things about it never changed – notably each issue being organized around a theme, the very small typeface used throughout (over the years the magazine printed many letters from readers complaining the font was so tiny it was hard to read) and the tiny quotations and commentary that ran along the bottom of almost every page. The zine attracted some notable fans, including Star Trek producer Brannon Braga, who sent in a fan letter. Many alternative cartoonists of the era (such as Adrian Tomine and Ellen Forney) were also fans, and contributed to the zine's penultimate, comics-themed issue.

Today Ben Is Dead is perhaps best known for the three-part series of "Retro" issues, in which dozens of writers looked back at the trends and fads of their childhoods with a mix of nostalgia and horror. These issues were compiled into the sprawling book, Retro Hell: Life in the '70s and '80s, From Afros to Zotz. Early in the millennium, an anthology of Ben Is Dead articles was announced at Incommunicado Press, although the project eventually fell through. In 1996, Romeo established the University of California, Los Angeles' "Darby Romeo Collection of Zines," a permanent archive housed in what was at the time UCLA's Arts Library Special Collections. The "Romeo (Darby) Collection of Zines" is currently housed in UCLA Library Special Collections and is part of the UCLA Library Punk Archive.

Many of Ben is Dead's writers have continued their writing careers (Vaginal Davis writes for LA Weekly, Lisa Crystal Carver and Mikki Halpin have each written several books, etc.) including Romeo, who has penned articles for LA Weekly, Alternative Press, Vanity Fair, the Chicago Tribune and The Village Voice among others. She currently maintains the blog Coconut Girl Wireless.
