= Happy Days, Sweetheart =

Studio album by Ethyl Meatplow
- Released: April 13, 1993
- Label: Dali Records
- Producer: Barry Adamson; Ethyl Meatplow

Professional ratings
Review scores
Source	Rating
AllMusic	4/5 stars
Rolling Stone	3/5 stars

Happy Days, Sweetheart is the 1993 debut and only album by the rock band Ethyl Meatplow. The album was released on Chameleon Records, distributed by Elektra Entertainment and produced by Barry Adamson. The album received praise by many critics but did not fare very well commercially.

The video for "Devil's Johnson" was featured on an episode of Beavis & Butt-head.

== Track listing ==
1. "Opening Precautionary Instructions" - 0:44
2. "Suck" - 4:08
3. "Devil's Johnson" - 3:13
4. "Car" - 2:26
5. "Queenie" - 3:35
6. "(They Long to Be) Close to You" - 3:29
7. "Tommy" - 4:36
8. "Mustard Requiem" - 1:44
9. "Abazab" - 4:27
10. "Ripened Peach" - 4:30
11. "Feed" - 5:25
12. "Rise" - 4:53
13. "For My Sleepy Lover" - 0:51
14. "Sad Bear" - 5:06
15. "Untitled" - 6:18

== Chart positions ==
Singles

Single	Chart (1993)	Position
"Queenie"	US Hot Dance Club Songs	3

== Personnel ==
- Barry Adamson - Producer, Additional Vocals (Tracks 2, 9 & 14)
- David Brown - Alto Sax (Track 2)
- Carla Bozulich - Vocals, Trumpet
- Chris Fuhrman - Engineering
- Sayuri Kawada - Violin
- Daniel Keenan - Additional Vocals (Tracks 2)
- Eeda Kitto - Violin
- John Napier - Drums
- Harold Barefoot Sanders - Vocals, Guitar
- Albert Wing - Tenor Sax (Track 2)
