= Edith Lindeman =

American journalist

- Born: March 21, 1898; Pittsburgh, Pennsylvania, US
- Died: December 22, 1984 (aged 86); Henrico County, Virginia, US
- Other name: Edith Elliott Lindeman Calisch

Edith Lindeman (March 21, 1898 – December 22, 1984), also known as Edith Elliott Lindeman Calisch, was the film and theater critic for the Richmond Times-Dispatch from 1933 to 1964. She is best remembered for writing lyrics to popular songs, in collaboration with composer and Richmond radio announcer Carl Stutz.

== Early writings ==
Before joining the newspaper, Edith Lindeman wrote two children's books used in Jewish Sabbath schools, Bible Tales for the Very Young (1930) and Bible Tales for Young People (1934). Based on Old Testament stories, Lindeman wrote these at the request of her father-in-law, Rabbi Edward Nathan Calisch. She also wrote a one-act play (The Jews Who Stood by Washington) and also collected Jewish legends in Fairy Tales from Grandfather's Big Book (1938) and Three Score and Twenty: A Brief Biography of Edward Nathan Calisch (1945).

== Newspaper career ==
She joined the Richmond Times-Dispatch in 1933, serving mostly as a film and theater critic, but also as a writer and editor on entertainment. She retired in 1964, estimating that she had seen 6,000 films during her 31-year stint at the paper. Her executive editor said "Edith Lindeman made a tremendous contribution to the cultural life of this community.... She'll be remembered especially for the strong coverage she provided for the area's regional theaters in their formative years."

== Songwriting ==
Collaborating with composer Carl Stutz, she wrote several dozen popular songs in the 1950s. She said she took up songwriting while driving through Kentucky with her husband. While listening to music on the radio, she said to her husband "I could write better lyrics than that." Her husband, who believed that she could do anything she set her mind to, replied "Well, why don't you?" The result was her first lyric, "Curves in Kentucky", which she took to Stutz, then an announcer at powerhouse radio station WRVA. The song never amounted to much, but Lindeman was convinced that she could write something better.

Her better work included "Little Things Mean a Lot", which, as recorded by Kitty Kallen, was the top song of 1954, and "Red Headed Stranger", which became a top hit when recorded by Willie Nelson. Members of the Western Writers of America chose it as one of the Top 100 Western songs of all time. She also wrote the lyrics for "Blackberry Winter", which became a back-door million-seller as the B-side of Mitch Miller's recording of "The Yellow Rose of Texas", which became a #1 hit in the U.S. in 1955.

Edith Lindeman was honored by the Songwriters Hall of Fame in 1977. She died in Richmond on December 22, 1984.
