= Carl Stutz =

American composer (?–1996)

Carl Stutz (died October 8, 1996) was an American composer, radio announcer and teacher.

Collaborating with lyricist Edith Lindeman, he wrote the music for several popular songs in the 1950s. His most well-known composition was "Little Things Mean a Lot", which was the #1 song in the U.S. in 1954. The Kitty Kallen recording sold over a million copies in just a few weeks. He and Lindeman also collaborated on "Red Headed Stranger", which was a hit song for Willie Nelson, and "Blackberry Winter", which became a back-door million-seller as the B-side of Mitch Miller's recording of The Yellow Rose of Texas, a #1 hit in the U.S. in 1955.

During his songwriting years, Stutz was an announcer at powerhouse radio station WRVA in Richmond, Virginia. He later became a high-school mathematics teacher at Manchester High School in Chesterfield, Virginia. Carl Stutz died, at age 80, in Richmond on October 8, 1996.
