= Temple Ohev Sholom (Harrisburg, Pennsylvania) =

Reform Synagogue in Harrisburg, Pennsylvania

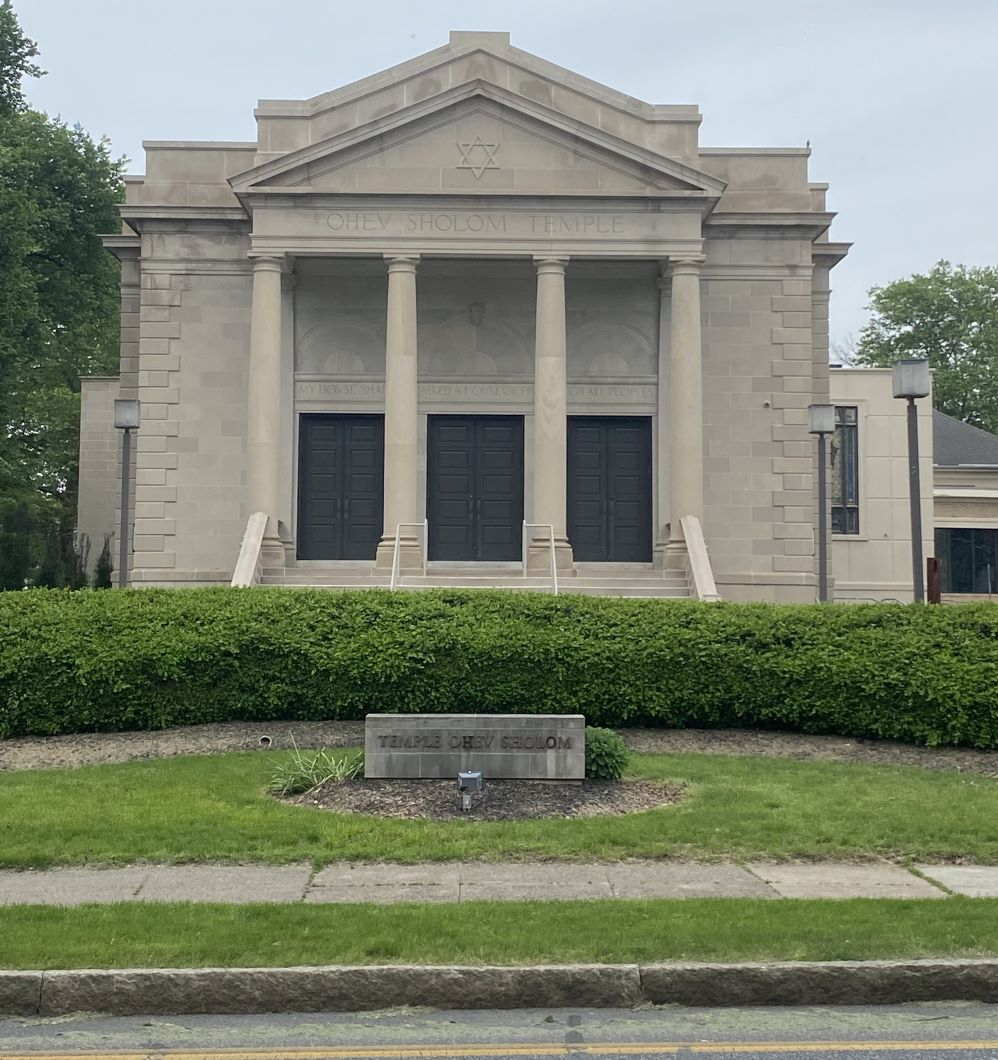
- Temple Ohev Sholom as seen from Front Street in 2025

- Location in Pennsylvania

Religion
- Affiliation: Reform Judaism
- Ecclesiastical or organisational status: Synagogue
- Leadership: Rabbi Tzvia Jasper
- Status: Active

Location
- Location: 2345 North Front Street, Harrisburg, Pennsylvania 17110
- Country: United States
- Coordinates: 40°16′57″N 76°54′07″W

Architecture
- Architects: Frank Gordon Fahnestock, Jr.
- Type: Synagogue
- Established: 1853 (as a congregation)
- Completed: 1920
- Direction of façade: West (facing the Susquehanna River)

Website
- ohevsholom.org

Temple Ohev Sholom is a Reform Jewish congregation and synagogue located at 2345 North Front Street, Harrisburg, Pennsylvania, in the United States.

Founded in 1853 as an Orthodox congregation by 24 German immigrant families, is the oldest Jewish congregation in the city and its surrounding area. In 1867, it became a Reform congregation. The current synagogue building at Front and Seneca Streets was built in 1920 with a Greco-Roman classical front façade.

Rabbi Tzvia Jasper (she/they) was hired in June, 2025 to become the new Rabbi of Ohev Sholom. She succeeded Rabbi Marc Kline who served as an interim Rabbi for three years, following long time Rabbi, Peter Kesler.
