= Ethyl Meatplow =

- Genre: Dance-rock
- Years active: 1989–1993
- Labels: Motiv Communications/Spasm; Piece of Mind Records; Sympathy for the Record Industry/Dali Records; Elektra
- Past members: Carla Bozulich; Harold "Biff" Barefoot Sanders III; John "Wee-Wee" Napier

Ethyl Meatplow was an American industrial band best known for their sole album, Happy Days, Sweetheart, released in 1993 by Dali Records.

== History ==
Ethyl Meatplow gained media coverage for its sexually explicit, burlesque-inspired live performances. They released their sole album Happy Days, Sweetheart in 1993. Rolling Stone described the album as a "smorgasbord of unbridled lust and dance-floor fun." The video for "Devil's Johnson" featured on the Beavis and Butthead episode "Young, Gifted & Crude" and was aired on MTV's 120 Minutes. The band played Lollapalooza and attracted criticism from Kim Gordon and Julia Cafritz of Free Kitten for its nude dancers and "recorded music," though others noted the band's use of found sounds and musique concrète methods.

Singer/trumpeter Carla Bozulich later formed the alt-country band Geraldine Fibbers. Drummer Harold Barefoot Sanders III later formed the band Polar Bear with Eric Avery. Singer/guitarist John Napier was later a touring member of Nitzer Ebb, and died in November 2012.

== Discography ==
- "MK Ultra" - Cassette (1989, Motiv Communications/Motico Music)
- "Dancing With Pork Face: Bump and Grind Mixes - 7" (1990, Motiv Communications/Spasm)
- "Colored Maxi" - 12" (1991, Piece of Mind Records)
- "Queenie" - 7"/12" (1992, Sympathy for the Record Industry/Dali Records)
- "Ripened Peach" - 12" (1993, Elektra)
- Happy Days, Sweetheart - CD (1993, Dali Records)
- "Betty Boy / Queenie" - 7" (1993, Dali)
- "Devil's Johnson" - CDS (1993, Dali Records/Festival Records)
