= Robert Penn Warren =

American poet, novelist, and literary critic (1905–1989)

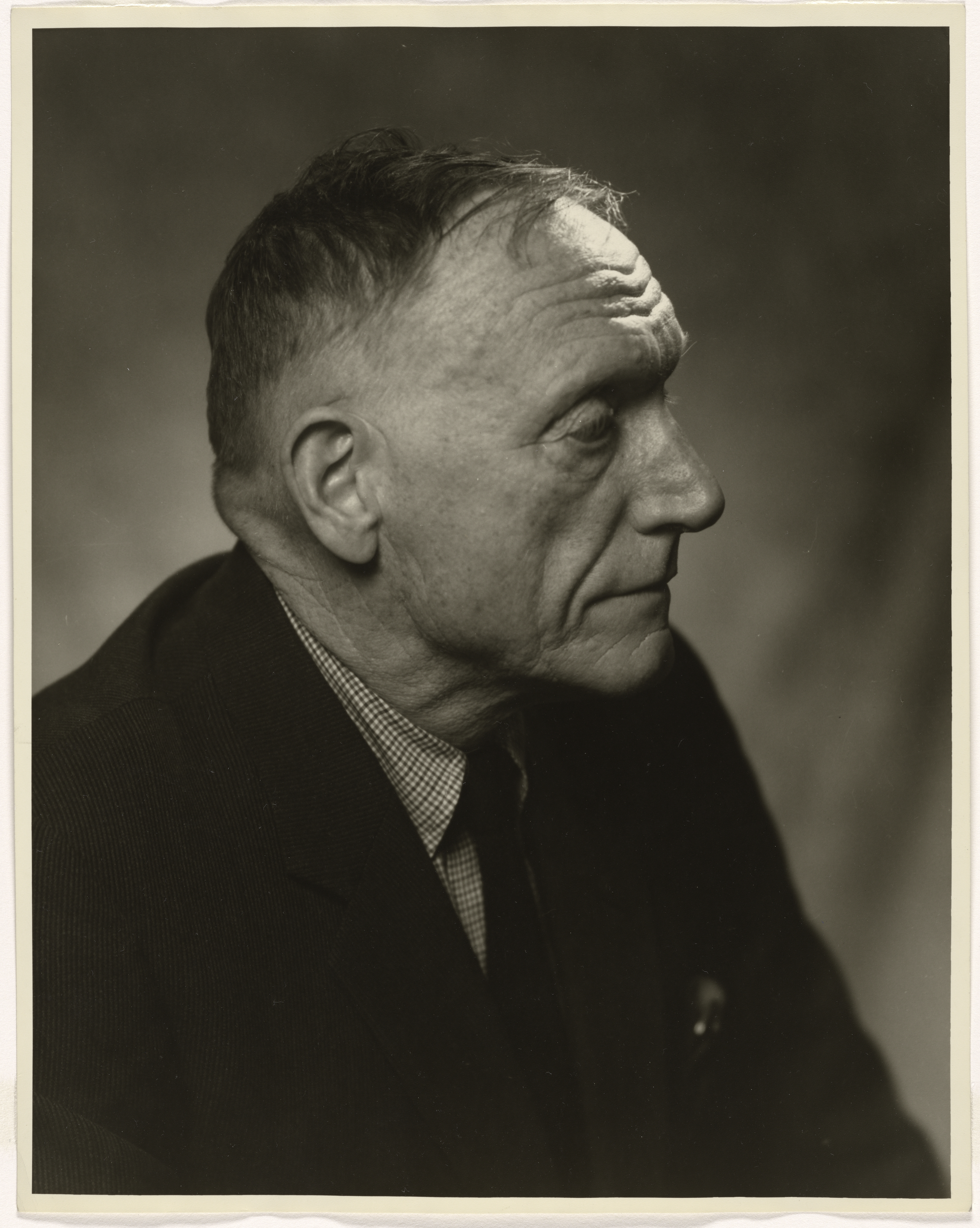
- Warren in 1968
- Born: April 24, 1905; Guthrie, Kentucky, U.S.
- Died: September 15, 1989 (aged 84); Stratton, Vermont, U.S.
- Education: Vanderbilt University (BA); University of California, Berkeley (MA); Yale University; New College, Oxford (BLitt)
- Occupations: Writer; critic
- Spouses: Emma "Cinina" Brescia (1929–1951); Eleanor Clark (1952 – his death)
- Writing career
- Genres: Poetry; novels
- Notable awards: Pulitzer Prize for the Novel (1947); Pulitzer Prize for Poetry (1958, 1979); Bollingen Prize (1967); Robert Frost Medal (1985)

Robert Penn Warren (April 24, 1905 – September 15, 1989) was an American poet, novelist, literary critic and professor at Yale University. He was one of the founders of New Criticism. He was also a charter member of the Fellowship of Southern Writers. He founded the literary journal The Southern Review with Cleanth Brooks in 1935. He received the 1947 Pulitzer Prize for the Novel for All the King's Men (1946) and the Pulitzer Prize for Poetry in 1958 and 1979. He is the only person to have won Pulitzer Prizes for both fiction and poetry. Yale awarded Warren an honorary Doctor of Letters degree in 1973.

== Early years ==
Warren was born in Guthrie, Kentucky, very near the Tennessee-Kentucky border, to Robert Warren and Anna Penn. Warren's mother's family had roots in Virginia, having given their name to the community of Penn's Store in Patrick County, Virginia, and she was a descendant of Revolutionary War soldier Colonel Abram Penn.

After he had graduated from a private high school at age 15, his mother enrolled him in Clarksville High School in Clarksville, Tennessee for a year because she thought he was too young to go to college. In 1921 his left eye was removed after an accident, which canceled his appointment to the U.S. Naval Academy. That summer, he published in "The Messkit" his first poem "Prophecy." In the fall of 1921, at age 16, he entered Vanderbilt University in Nashville, Tennessee, graduating in the summer of 1925 summa cum laude, Phi Beta Kappa, and Founder's Medalist. That fall, he entered the University of California, Berkeley, as a graduate student and teaching assistant, and upon receiving his M.A. in 1927, entered Yale University on a fellowship. In October 1928 he entered New College, Oxford, in England as a Rhodes Scholar and received his B.Litt. in the spring of 1930. He also received a Guggenheim Fellowship to study in Italy during the rule of Benito Mussolini. That same year he began his teaching career at Southwestern College (now Rhodes College) in Memphis, Tennessee.

== Career ==
While still an undergraduate at Vanderbilt University, Warren became associated with the group of poets there known as the Fugitives, and somewhat later, during the early 1930s, Warren and some of the same writers formed a group known as the Southern Agrarians. He contributed "The Briar Patch" to the Agrarian manifesto I'll Take My Stand along with 11 other Southern writers and poets (including fellow Vanderbilt poet/critics John Crowe Ransom, Allen Tate, and Donald Davidson). In "The Briar Patch" the young Warren defends racial segregation, in line with the political leanings of the Agrarian group, although Davidson deemed Warren's stances in the essay so progressive that he argued for excluding it from the collection. However, Warren recanted these views in an article on the civil rights movement, "Divided South Searches Its Soul", which appeared in the July 9, 1956 issue of Life magazine. A month later, Warren published an expanded version of the article as a small book titled Segregation: The Inner Conflict in the South. He subsequently adopted a high profile as a supporter of racial integration. In 1965, he published Who Speaks for the Negro?, a collection of interviews with black civil rights leaders including Malcolm X and Martin Luther King Jr., thus further distinguishing his political leanings from the more conservative philosophies associated with fellow Agrarians such as Tate, Cleanth Brooks, and particularly Davidson. Warren's interviews with civil rights leaders are at the Louie B. Nunn Center for Oral History at the University of Kentucky.

Warren's best-known work is All the King's Men, a novel that won the Pulitzer Prize in 1947. Main character Willie Stark resembles Huey Pierce Long (1893–1935), the radical populist governor of Louisiana whom Warren was able to observe closely while teaching at Louisiana State University in Baton Rouge from 1933 to 1942. The 1949 film by the same name was highly successful, starring Broderick Crawford and winning the Academy Award for Best Picture in 1949. There was another film adaptation in 2006 featuring Sean Penn as Willie Stark. The opera Willie Stark by Carlisle Floyd, to his own libretto based on the novel, was first performed in 1981.

Warren served as the Consultant in Poetry to the Library of Congress, 1944–1945 (later termed Poet Laureate), and won two Pulitzer Prizes in poetry, in 1958 for Promises: Poems 1954–1956 and in 1979 for Now and Then. Promises also won the annual National Book Award for Poetry.

In 1974, the National Endowment for the Humanities selected him for the Jefferson Lecture, the U.S. federal government's highest honor for achievement in the humanities. Warren's lecture was entitled "Poetry and Democracy" (subsequently published under the title Democracy and Poetry). In 1977, Warren was awarded the St. Louis Literary Award from the Saint Louis University Library Associates. In 1980, Warren was presented with the Presidential Medal of Freedom by President Jimmy Carter. In 1981, Warren was selected as a MacArthur Fellow and later was named as the first U.S. Poet Laureate Consultant in Poetry on February 26, 1986. In 1987, he was awarded the National Medal of Arts. Warren was an elected member of the American Academy of Arts and Sciences and the American Philosophical Society.

Warren was co-author, with Cleanth Brooks, of Understanding Poetry, an influential literature textbook. It was followed by other similarly co-authored textbooks, including Understanding Fiction, which was praised by Southern Gothic and Roman Catholic writer Flannery O'Connor, and Modern Rhetoric, which adopted what can be called a New Critical perspective.

== Personal life ==
His first marriage was to Emma Brescia. His second marriage was in 1952 to Eleanor Clark, with whom he had two children, Rosanna Phelps Warren (born 1953) and Gabriel Penn Warren (born 1955). During his tenure at Louisiana State University he resided at Twin Oaks (otherwise known as the Robert Penn Warren House) in Prairieville, Louisiana.

Warren was a lifelong Democrat who cast his first vote for Franklin D. Roosevelt in 1932. Formerly a segregationist, he renounced these views in the 1950s and began to advocate for African American civil rights, condemning Dwight D. Eisenhower for not taking a firmer stance on the subject.

He lived the latter part of his life in Fairfield, Connecticut, and Stratton, Vermont, where he died of complications from prostate cancer. He is buried at Stratton, Vermont, and, at his request, a memorial marker is situated in the Warren family gravesite in Guthrie, Kentucky.

== Legacy ==
In April 2005, the United States Postal Service issued a commemorative stamp to mark the 100th anniversary of Warren's birth. Introduced at the post office in his native Guthrie, it depicts the author as he appeared in a 1948 photograph, with a background scene of a political rally designed to evoke the setting of All the King's Men. His son and daughter, Gabriel and Rosanna Warren, were in attendance.

Robert Penn Warren's papers are held in Yale's Beinecke Rare Book and Manuscript Library. Yale celebrated the centennial of Warren's birth on October 21, 2005, at an event featuring Harold Bloom and Warren's daughter poet Roseanna Warren.

Vanderbilt University created the Robert Penn Warren Center for the Humanities, which is sponsored by the College of Arts and Science. It began its programs in January 1988, and in 1989 received a $480,000 Challenge Grant from the National Endowment for the Humanities. The Center promotes "interdisciplinary research and study in the humanities, social sciences, and natural sciences."

In 2014 Vanderbilt University opened Warren College, one of the first 2 residential colleges at the university, along with Moore College.

He was a charter member of the Fellowship of Southern Writers.

== Works ==
=== Poems ===
- Thirty-Six Poems (Alcestis Press; December 3, 1935 in a limited edition of 165 copies)
- Eleven Poems on the Same Theme (1942)
- Selected Poems, 1923–1943 (1944)
- Brother to Dragons: A Tale in Verse and Voices (1953)
- Promises: Poems: 1954–1956 (1957)
- You, Emperors, and Others: Poems 1957–1960 (1960)
- Selected Poems: New and Old 1923–1966 (1966)
- Incarnations: Poems 1966–1968 (1968)
- Audubon: A Vision (1969). Book-length poem
- Or Else: Poem/Poems 1968–1974 (1974)
- Selected Poems: 1923–1975 (1976)
- Now and Then: Poems 1976–1978 (1978)
- Brother to Dragons: A Tale in Verse and Voices – A New Version (1979)
- Being Here: Poetry 1977–1980 (1980)
- Rumor Verified: Poems 1979–1980 (1981)
- Chief Joseph of the Nez Perce (1983). Book-length poem
- New and Selected Poems: 1923–1985 (1985)
- Portrait of a Father (1988)
- The Collected Poems (1998), edited by John Burt
- The Poets Laureate Anthology (W. W. Norton & Company, 2010)

=== Prose ===
==== Novels ====
- Night Rider (1939)
- At Heaven's Gate (1943)
- All the King's Men (1946)
- Blackberry Winter: A Story Illustrated by Wightman Williams (1946)
- World Enough and Time (1950)
- Band of Angels (1955)
- The Cave (1959)
- Wilderness: A Tale of the Civil War (1961)
- Flood: A Romance of Our Time (1964)
- Meet Me in the Green Glen (1971)
- A Place to Come to (1977)
- All the King's Men: Restored Edition (2002), edited by Noel Polk

==== Short story collections ====
- The Circus in the Attic and Other Stories (1947)

=== Nonfiction ===
- John Brown: The Making of a Martyr (1929)
- An Approach to Literature (1936), with Cleanth Brooks and John Thibaut Purser
- Understanding Poetry (1938), with Cleanth Brooks
- Understanding Fiction (1943), with Cleanth Brooks
- Fundamentals of Good Writing: A Handbook of Modern Rhetoric (1950), with Cleanth Brooks
- Segregation: The Inner Conflict in the South (1956)
- Selected Essays (1958)
- The Legacy of the Civil War (1961)
- Who Speaks for the Negro? (1965)
- Homage to Theodor Dreiser (1971)
- John Greenleaf Whittier's Poetry: An Appraisal and a Selection (1971)
- American Literature: The Makers and the Making (1974), with Cleanth Brooks and R.W.B. Lewis
- Democracy and Poetry (1975)
- Jefferson Davis Gets His Citizenship Back (1980)
- New and Selected Essays (1989)

=== Plays ===
- All the King's Men: A Play (1960)
- All the King's Men: Three Stage Versions (2000), edited by James A. Grimshaw Jr. and James A. Perkins

=== Children's books ===
- Remember the Alamo! (1958)
- The Gods of Mount Olympus (1959)
- How Texas Won Her Freedom (1959)
