= The Geraldine Fibbers =

American alt-country band

- Origin: Los Angeles, California, U.S.
- Genres: Alternative country, alternative rock
- Years active: 1993–1998
- Labels: Sympathy for the Record Industry, Virgin
- Past members: Carla Bozulich; Daniel Keenan; Julie Fowells; William Tutton; Kevin Fitzgerald; Bronwyn Adams; Jessy Greene; Nels Cline; Jessica Moss; Leyna Marika P.

The Geraldine Fibbers were an alt-country band founded in 1993 by Carla Bozulich. Initially, band members included Bozulich, Daniel Keenan, Julie Fowells, William Tutton and Kevin Fitzgerald. While Bozulich had previously been known for noisy industrial music, The Geraldine Fibbers fused American roots music and blues-influenced punk.

Julie Fowells left the band quite early and was replaced with Bronwyn Adams who played violin on most of the pre-Virgin recordings.

Just as the group signed to Virgin, Bronwyn Adams departed and was replaced with Jessy Greene who remained until mid-1997.

The group always incorporated noise and experimentation into their sound, which has been mis-labeled as Alternative Country. In early 1996, Keenan departed, to be replaced by Nels Cline, the band shifting to an even more noisy, guitar-rock sound.

Jessy Greene stayed with the band until both Virgin albums had been recorded. Greene was replaced with Leyna Marika P. who, due to prior commitments, could not join immediately. Jessica Moss was recruited to fill in for Leyna on the Butch tour. However, in 2017 when Lost Somewhere Between the Earth and My Home was reissued with bonus tracks, it is Jessica Moss playing violin on the new track, "Thank You for Giving Me Life".

Spin magazine named Lost Somewhere Between the Earth and My Home and Butch to their top albums of 1995 and 1997 lists, respectively.

Moss joined A Silver Mt. Zion in 2001. The Nels Cline Singers and an enormously diverse biography surround Nels Cline. In 2004 he joined the alternative band, Wilco. Fitzgerald has played with Eleni Mandell, The Circle Jerks and others. William Tutton is now a Los Angeles-based session musician, and has performed live with numerous acts, such as the Grandmothers, Chris Stamey, Glen Meadmore, Los Super Elegantes, El Vez, Badwater Bob, and the Wild Honey Orchestra. Bozulich made her 4th album for her group, Evangelista on Constellation Records.

In April 2017, it was announced that Lost Somewhere Between the Earth and My Home would be reissued on vinyl by Jealous Butcher Records on May 5, 2017. The reissue will be mixed for vinyl by Steve Fisk and include "Bitter Honey" and "234" from the original sessions, a previously unreleased studio version of "You Doo Right" featuring both Keenan and Cline on guitar, and a new song "Thank You for Giving Me Life" featuring Bozulich, Tutton, Fitzgerald, Cline and Moss as the lineup.

== Discography ==
=== Albums and EPs ===
- Get Thee Gone – 10" EP (1994, Sympathy for the Record Industry)
- The Geraldine Fibbers – CD EP (1994, Hut)
- The Geraldine Fibbers – promo CD EP (1995, Virgin) – it doesn't have an actual title, sometimes you can see it listed as G Fibbers or Bitter Honey
- Lost Somewhere Between the Earth and My Home – CD (1995, Virgin)
- Live from the Bottom of the Hill – promo CD (1996, Virgin)
- Butch – CD (1997, Virgin)
- Butch – 2xLP (1997, Sympathy for the Record Industry)
- What Part of Get Thee Gone Don't You Understand? – CD (1997, Sympathy for the Record Industry)
- Lost Somewhere Between the Earth and My Home – Record Store Day LP reissue with bonus tracks (2017, Jealous Butcher)

=== Singles ===
- "Marmalade/Get Thee Gone" (Live) – 7" (1994, Hut/Virgin)
- "Dragon Lady" – CDS (1995, Hut/Virgin)
- "Dragon Lady/Birthday Boy" – 7" (1995, Sympathy for the Record Industry)
- "Fancy/They Suck" – 7" (1995, Big Jesus)
- "Marmalade" – promo CDS (1995, Virgin)
- "House Is Falling (Remix)" – promo CDS (1995, Virgin)
- "California Tuffy" – promo CDS (1997, Virgin) – 2 different versions exist
- "California Tuffy/Folks Like Me" – promo 7" (1997, Virgin)
- "Din Din Goes to Space" (Live) – 7" (1994, Hut/Philippines)

=== Compilation appearances ===
- The Poop Alley Tapes – track "He Stopped Loving Her Today" (1995, WIN Records)
- Definitivt Beat Nr 10-95 – track "Get Thee Gone" (1995, Beat (magazine))
- All Over Me OST – track "Dragon Lady" (1997, TVT)
- Alright, This Time Just the Girls – edited version of "Toybox" (1999, Kill Rock Stars)
- Drinking from Puddles: A Radio History – live version of "Butch" (1999, Kill Rock Stars)
- Jackson's Jukebox – track "Butch" (2000, Kill Rock Stars)
- Root Damage – track "She's a Dog" (2003, Sympathy for the Record Industry)

=== Videos ===
- "Dragon Lady"
- "California Tuffy"
