= Carla Bozulich =

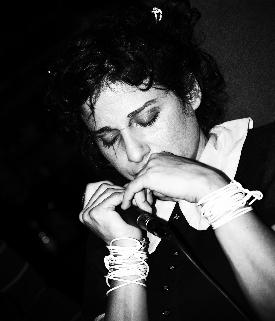
- Bozulich in 2008

Background information
- Born: Carla Ragin Bozulich; December 24, 1965 (age 60); New York City, New York, U.S.
- Origin: Los Angeles, California, U.S.
- Genres: Alternative rock; experimental rock; alternative country; noise
- Instruments: Vocals; guitar; bass; sampler
- Years active: 1982–present
- Labels: Constellation, Folktale
- Website: CarlaBozulich.com

Carla Ragin Bozulich (born December 24, 1965) is an American musician based in Los Angeles, known as the lead singer, lyricist and founder of The Geraldine Fibbers and Evangelista as well as a founding member of Ethyl Meatplow and Scarnella. The Geraldine Fibbers recorded two albums for Virgin Records. Their first album (Lost Somewhere Between The Earth And My Home) was described as "...a Country Feedback Masterpiece" by Vice.

Bozulich's Evangelista project began in 2006. The album was under her own name and titled Evangelista. The album was released by Montreal, Quebec-based Constellation Records and was that label's first release by a non-Canadian artist. In 2007, The Sunday Times called Evangelista "...a vivid inner darkness which shames rock's weeping millionaires." On the albums Hello, Voyager (2008), Prince of Truth (2009) and In Animal Tongue (2011), Bozulich adopted Evangelista as a project name. Some consistent members include bassist Tara Barnes, keyboardist/sampler Dominic Cramp, guitarist Nels Cline, violinist Jessica Moss, organist Nadia Moss, drummer Ches Smith, multi-instrumentalist and co-producer Shahzad Ismaily. Various members of Godspeed! You Black Emperor contributed to arranging, recording and additional collaborative songwriting. The line-up of Evangelista changes each time they play or record. The Hello, Voyager album features 14 musicians over various pieces.

In 2014, Constellation released Boy, under Bozulich's name, as solo artist. Her most recent album with Constellation, Quieter was released in May 2018 and is a compilation of previously unreleased recordings. Bozulich has also been involved in other projects, including collaborations with Francesco Guerri, Noveller/Sarah Lipstate and Devin Sarno.

== Musical career ==
Bozulich was born in New York City, and raised in San Pedro, California. Her musical career began at age 17 in a garage in Lawndale, California, with her first band, The Neon Veins. Under the name Carla Noelle, she also contributed to a recording by artist Gary Kail titled "Zurich 1916", which was released in 1984 as part of the album Creative Nihilism.

Bozulich produced and arranged the 2013 self-titled album by the band Blue Willa. This collaboration was documented in a short film by Pamela Maddaleno entitled Ignore the Noise in the Amp.

She carried the recorded files from this album during 6 months of travel, mixing on her suitcase studio in multiple countries including France, Italy, Germany, Turkey and India. In March 2014, she released the self-produced solo album Boy with Evangelista member John Eichenseer and percussionist Andrea Belfi as her main collaborators.

On May 5, 2017, Jealous Butcher Records reissued Lost Somewhere Between the Earth and My Home by the Geraldine Fibbers on vinyl format in the United States. This reissue included a previously unreleased song "Thank You For Giving Me Life" performed by Bozulich on vocals, William Tutton on bass, Kevin Fitzgerald on drums, Nels Cline on guitar and Jessica Moss on violin.

Bozulich has used the name Bloody Claws for one-off concerts and tours, including 45 International concerts with Francesco Guerri, with whom she toured Europe in 2009. She has also contributed to recordings by Mike Watt, Hadda Brooks and Lydia Lunch. She has performed live with Watt, as well as with Thurston Moore, Christian Marclay; Carla Kihlstedt, Wayne Kramer, Wilco, Agathe Max, and Italian guitarist Simone Massaron.

On August 16–17, 2009 she performed live with Marianne Faithfull and Marc Ribot in Düsseldorf as part of the 2009 Ruhrtriennale. Willie Nelson performed on her 2003 album The Red Headed Stranger, a song-by-song cover of his album of the same name.

Bozulich scored a 2001 production of Jean Genet's play The Maids, as well as the 2003 film By Hook or by Crook, directed by Harry Dodge and Silas Howard and produced by Steak House. The Geraldine Fibbers songs "Lilybelle" and "Seven or in 10," both co written by Bozulich, have been covered by Kiki and Herb. The Geraldine Fibbers track "Dragon Lady" was featured in the 1997 film All Over Me, and "House Is Falling" is featured in the opening scene of the film Kill Me Later, in which Selma Blair’s character contemplates suicide while teetering on the roof of her workplace.

Bozulich performed as a solo artist at two All Tomorrows Parties festivals as well as two Bad Bonn Kilbi festivals. In 2005, she performed Brecht/Weill composition "The Ballad of the Lily of Hell" at the Meltdown Festival in London, curated by musician Patti Smith.

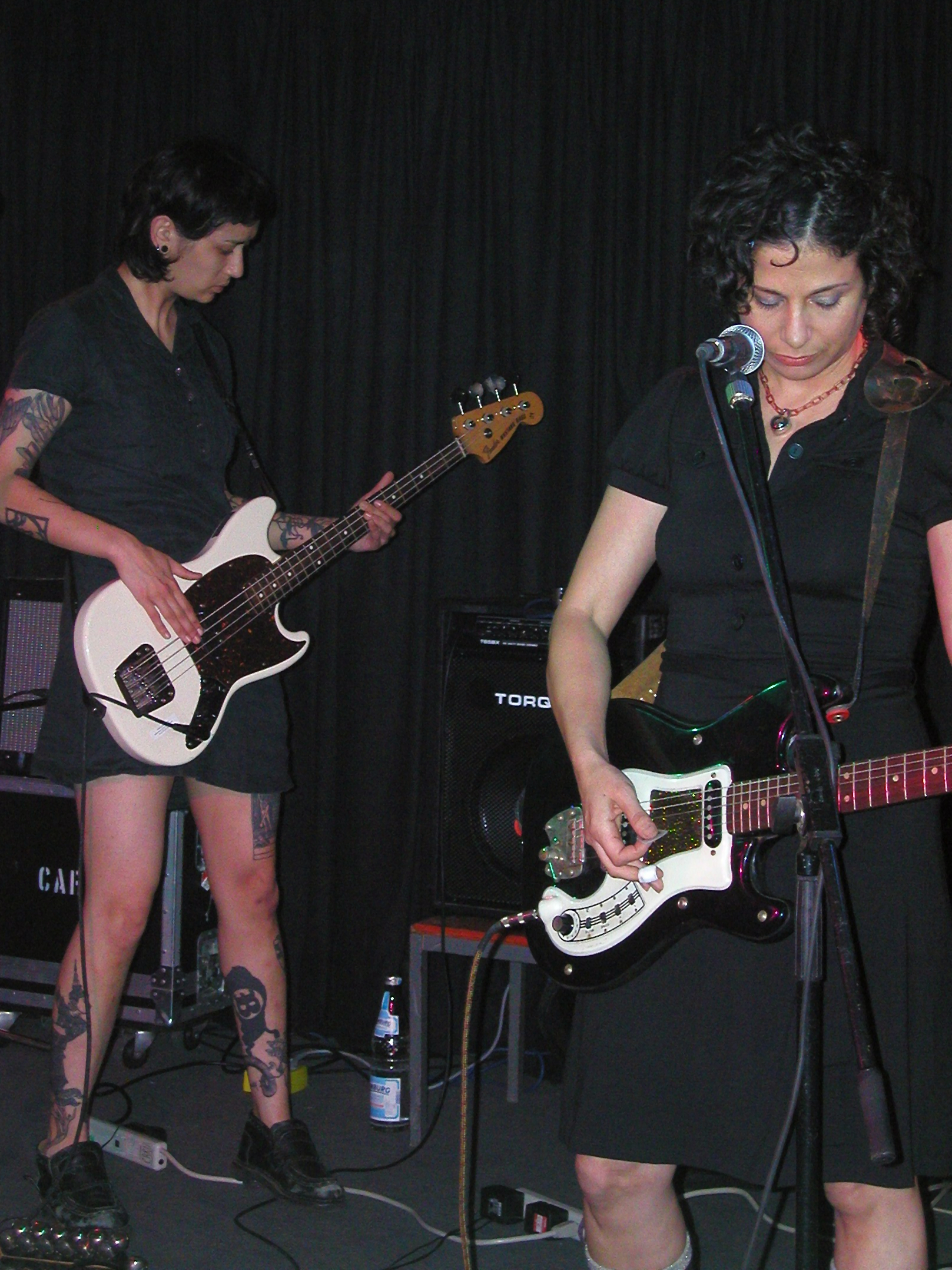
Carla Bozulich and Tara Barnes in Club W71, Weikersheim

== Performance art ==
Between 2000 and 2010, Bozulich created site-specific performance art pieces under the umbrella names Eyes for Ears and VOYAGERS. "Fake Party" (developed for Society for the Activation of Social Space through Art and Sound aka SASSAS) took place at the Schindler House in August 2000. During the piece, the audience were made to feel part of a faux party. Guests were then pulled from the "party" into a private room where they were serenaded by Bozulich lip-synching to old pop songs and eventually led into yet another party setting. A second piece, Performance for Fever Dreams, was performed at the J. Paul Getty Museum in February 2004. The third performance in the series was a "guerilla sing-along" featuring Bozulich and others at Glendale Transportation Center in Glendale, California on Mother's Day 2005. Bozulich had recorded sounds at the train station for a previous project and decided to hold a free participatory musical event at the location. On March 5, 2010, Drowned To The Light, was performed as part of the California Institute of the Arts CEAIT Festival at REDCAT Theater in Los Angeles and featured Bozulich — along with David Rothbaum, Ezra Buchla and Danny Frankel — performing songs and improvised music before the projected films of Brooklyn musician and filmmaker Sarah Lipstate. "Under the Skin" (as part of the VOYAGERS series) was performed on May 7, 2011 in Krems an der Donau, Austria at Donaufestival.

== Other work ==
Bozulich has written articles, short fiction, poetry and criticism for Alternative Press, LA Weekly, Wire Magazine, Ecstatic Peace, Bust Magazine and Ben Is Dead as well as being a featured poet at the 2014 Wire Off-The-Page Festival curated by: Wire Magazine, Qu Junktions and the Bristol Literary Coalition. She has expanded her short story "The Sparkely Jewel" into a full-length novel with some chapters already unveiled in public readings. Bozulich has also run workshop seminars teaching the creative process.

== Discography ==
- Solo albums:
  - Quieter [2018]
  - Boy [2014]
  - Unrock Instore Gig Series Volume 4 (released in Germany and limited to 300 copies) [2008]
  - Evangelista [2006]
  - I'm Gonna Stop Killing [2004]
  - The Red Headed Stranger [2003]
- Featured solo work:
  - New Coat of Paint: Songs of Tom Waits (song "On The Nickel") [2000]
  - Fields And Streams (song "Blue Boys") [2002]
  - For a Decade of Sin: 11 Years of Bloodshot Records (song "Lonesome Roads") [2005]
- As leader of Evangelista:
  - Evangelista (released under the name Carla Bozulich) [2006]
  - Hello, Voyager [2008]
  - Live at Issue Project, NYC June 15, 2008 (self-released CD sold at live shows) [2008]
  - Prince Of Truth [2009]
  - In Animal Tongue [2011]
  - Abisso (album by OvO - Evangelista as a band collaborated on song "Fly Little Demon" [2013]
- As lead vocalist and lyricist of the Geraldine Fibbers:
  - Get Thee Gone (vinyl only) [1995]
  - The Geraldine Fibbers (compact disc EP incorporating elements of Get Thee Gone) [1995]
  - Lost Somewhere Between the Earth and My Home [1995]
  - Live From the Bottom of the Hill [1996]
  - What Part of "Get Thee Gone" Don't You Understand? [1997]
  - Butch [1997]
  - Lost Somewhere Between the Earth and My Home (vinyl reissue with four bonus tracks) [2017]
- Collaboration with Blue Willa:
  - Blue Willa (producer, guest instrumentalist and background vocalist) [2013]
- As member of Scarnella:
  - Scarnella [1998]
  - Super Bad at 65: a Tribute to James Brown (song "Hot Pants") [1998]
- Duet album with Ches Smith:
  - Run (available as MP3 download only) [2012]
- Collaborative album with Simone Massaron:
  - Dandelions on Fire [2008]
- As a featured performer with Gary Kail/Zurich 1916:
  - Creative Nihilism (as Carla Noelle) [1984]
- As member of Invisible Chains:
  - Invisible Chains [1986]
- As member of Ethyl Meatplow:
  - Happy Days, Sweetheart [1993]
- As a featured vocalist with Mike Watt:
  - Ball-Hog or Tugboat? [1994]
- As a featured vocalist and composer with Barry Adamson:
  - Oedipus Schmoedipus (as Carla Bozlavich) (song "It's Business As Usual") [1996]
- As a featured vocalist with Wayne Kramer:
  - Citizen Wayne (song "Back When Dogs Could Talk") [1997]
- As a featured duet vocalist with Hadda Brooks:
  - I've Got News For You (song "Sometimes I'm Happy") [1999]
- As a featured vocalist with Victor Krummenacher:
  - Bittersweet (song "Maybe A True Love") [2000]
- As a featured vocalist with Two Dollar Guitar:
  - Weak Beats And Lame-Ass Rhymes (song "Bozo Shoes" [2000]
- Electric Guitar, Sampling Keyboard with Nels Cline:
  - Destroy All Nels Cline [2001]
- As a featured vocalist and musician with Bonnie Barnett, Carla Bozulich, Rick Potts:
  - Various - SoundCd no. 1 (song "Do You Dig?") [2002]
- As a featured performer:
  - Various - SoundCd no. 1 (song "Carla Bozulich's Fake Party: Audience Cassette Tape Improv") [2002]
- As a featured vocalist of The Scott Amendola Band:
  - Cry (song "Masters of War") [2003]
- As a featured duet vocalist with Lydia Lunch:
  - Smoke In The Shadows (song "I Love How You...") [2004]
  - A Fistful of Desert Blues (with Cypress Grove—song "End of My Rope") [2014]
- As a featured vocalist with Gowns:
  - Dangers Of Intimacy (song "Apple") [2004]
- As a featured vocalist with Nels Cline:
  - Various - Secular Steel (song "Eagle Rockers") [2004)
- As a featured vocalist for The Book of Knots:
  - Traineater (song "View From a Watertower") [2007]
- As a featured vocalist for Bulbul:
  - 6 (song "Shenzhou") [2008]
- As a featured vocalist for Mickey Finn + Cuong Vu:
  - Gagarin (song " I Can´t Feel It Anymore") [2009]
- As a featured additional vocalist for Hawnay Troof:
  - Daggers At The Moon (songs "U Can Just Ask" and "Like Her")
- As a featured vocalist with (r):
  - Drama Queen (song "'See What The Boys In The Backroom Will Have") [2011]
- As a featured additional vocalist for Whitman:
  - Dog Rose Gall (song "Wishes And War Paint")
- As a featured vocalist with Xiu Xiu:
  - Always (song "Smear the Queen") [2012]
- As a featured vocalist with Jherek Bischoff:
  - Composed (song "Counting") [2012]
- As a featured vocalist with Aidan Baker:
  - Already Drowning (song "Lorelei/Common Tongue") [2013]
- As a featured vocalist with TSU!:
  - HMS Angora (songs "Lilac and Stork" and "Day of Skucha") [2014]
