= Red Headed Stranger (film) =

1986 film by William D. Wittliff

- Directed by: William D. Wittliff
- Written by: William D. Wittliff
- Produced by: Willie Nelson; William D. Wittliff
- Starring: Willie Nelson; Morgan Fairchild; R.G. Armstrong; Royal Dano; Katharine Ross
- Cinematography: Neil Roach
- Edited by: Stephen Purvis; Eric A. Williams
- Music by: Willie Nelson
- Production companies: R.H.S. Productions; Panagea; Wrangler Jeans
- Distributed by: Alive Films
- Release date: October 31, 1986 (United States)
- Running time: 105 minutes
- Country: United States
- Language: English
- Budget: $1.8 million

Red Headed Stranger is a 1986 American independent Western drama film written and directed by William D. Wittliff. The film stars Willie Nelson and Morgan Fairchild. It is based on Nelson's album Red Headed Stranger (1975).

== Plot ==
In 1901, Preacher Julian Shay (Nelson) and his new bride Raysha (Fairchild) leave Philadelphia for Driscoll, Montana, to replace a minister who tells Julian, "You'll be fighting the devil on his own ground here, sir."

Julian soon learns the town is under the control of Larn Clavers and his sons, who monopolize the water supply. The preacher convinces Sheriff Scoby, the town's honest but fearful lawman, to stand up to the Clavers. He also gets the townspeople to re-excavate, and then guard, an old water well. A man protecting the well is murdered by Odie Clavers, one of Larn's sons. Odie is hanged for his crime.

Raysha hates living in Driscoll and contacts an old lover, who comes to Montana and takes her away from the town. Julian tracks down his wife and her lover, and he kills them both. The preacher then wanders about the west until meeting Laurie (Ross), a farm widow with a young son named Nathan. Julian helps Laurie and Nathan work their farm and considers settling down with them, but Sheriff Scoby finds him. In Julian's absence, the Clavers had attacked Scoby and disabled the well's windmill pump, then threatened to kill anyone else who stood up to them. Driscoll's residents were cowed into trying to dismiss Scoby to avoid further violence. Scoby convinces Julian to return to Driscoll and help him fight against the Clavers.

Overnight, Julian and Scoby repair Driscoll's windmill, restoring the flow of water. The Clavers notice this in the morning and Larn declares he will destroy the windmill this time, but they are immediately ambushed by Julian and Scoby. Although Scoby is wounded in the battle, Julian manages to outfox and outgun the family. The Clavers' corpses are mounted on boards and displayed outside the sheriff's office. Julian bids Scoby farewell and returns to Laurie and Nathan.

== Cast ==
- Willie Nelson as Julian Shay
- Morgan Fairchild as Raysha Shay
- Royal Dano as Larn Clavers
- R. G. Armstrong as Sheriff Reese Scoby
- Katharine Ross as Laurie
- Sonny Carl Davis as Odie Claver

== Production ==
Wittliff met Willie Nelson in the late 1970s. Wittliff was a writer on Honeysuckle Rose (1980) and Barbarosa (1982), which both starred Nelson. Nelson played his Red Headed Stranger for Wittliff, and Wittliff agreed to write a script based on the musical storyline. Wittliff finished a draft in 1979 and Universal Studios green-lighted the film with a budget of $14 million. The studio wanted Robert Redford to play the "Red Headed Stranger," a role Nelson had envisioned for himself. It took two years, but Redford finally turned the part down. Nelson and Wittliff gave back their advances to buy the script back.

HBO took an interest in the script and budgeted $5 million to produce it. Sam Peckinpah was attached to direct the film, but Peckinpah was unhappy with the low budget and left the project. The project died at HBO and Nelson and Wittliff began to raise the $5 million on their own. The budget ended up at $1.8 million, coming from a diverse group of investors, including Bud Shrake and Darrell Royal.

Red Headed Stranger began production on April 29, 1985. The main set, a western town nicknamed "Willieville," had been built over the previous two years across the road from Nelson's golf course, thirty miles west of Austin, Texas. Most of the filming was done in "Willieville," but nine other locations around Central Texas were also used. Production wrapped on June 14, 1985.

== Release ==
Red Headed Stranger debuted at the Denver International Film Festival in October 1985. Critical response was mediocre and called the movie "dull" (Variety) and "an insipid story" (The Denver Post). The film opened in Nelson and Wittliff's home state of Texas, where it received a warmer welcome. The movie then had a limited national release in larger cities such as Seattle, Washington, and Philadelphia, Pennsylvania.
