= Mississippi Quarterly =

American peer-reviewed scholarly journal

- Discipline: Southern literature
- Language: English
- Edited by: Ted Atkinson

Publication details
- Former name: Social Science Bulletin
- History: 1948-present
- Publisher: Johns Hopkins University Press for Mississippi State University College of Arts & Sciences (United States)
- Frequency: Quarterly

Standard abbreviations
- ISO 4: Miss. Q.

Indexing
- ISSN: 0026-637X
- LCCN: 59040435
- OCLC no.: 01758368

Links
- Journal homepage

The Mississippi Quarterly: The Journal of Southern Cultures is a peer-reviewed scholarly journal that mainly covers Southern history and literature. Originally entitled Social Sciences Bulletin, it was established in 1948 by John K. Bettersworth, who was associated with the journal until his death in 1991. While it began with a very wide focus, initially covering a variety of topics that fell under the umbrella of the social sciences, starting in 1953 the Bulletin gradually narrowed its academic range. Changing its title to its current state in that same year, the newly christened Quarterly soon began to focus almost solely on Southern literature. In 1968 it adopted its current subtitle, further cementing its reputation as a humanities journal. In that year it also began its cooperation with the Society for the Study of Southern Literature through which was produced the "Annual Checklist of Scholarship in Southern Literature". Its editors have included Robert B. Holland, Scott C. Osborn, Peyton W. Williams, Jr., Robert L. Phillipps, Jr., and Noel Polk. Its current editor is Ted Atkinson and its Associate and Managing editors are Robert M. West and Laura West respectively.
