= Edward Nathan Calisch =

American rabbi (1865–1946)

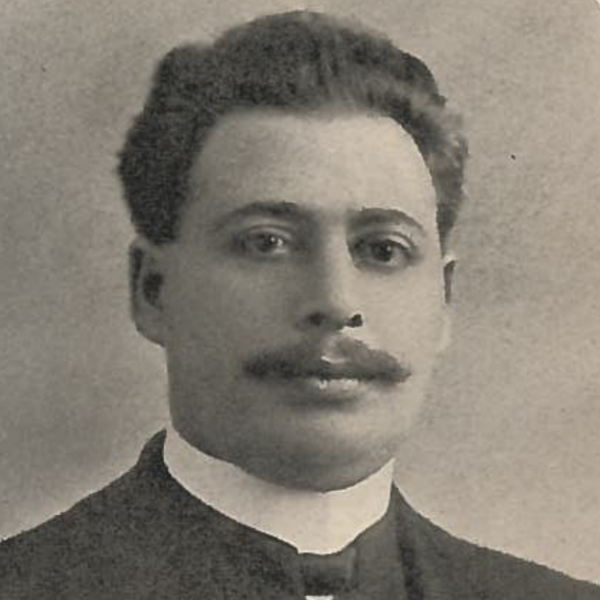

Edward Nathan Calisch (June 23, 1865 in Toledo, Ohio – 1946 in Richmond, Virginia) was an American Reform rabbi. He studied at the University of Cincinnati and was ordained after graduating from Hebrew Union College.

In 1887, Calisch accepted a pulpit in Peoria, Illinois. In 1891, he became rabbi of Congregation Beth Ahabah in Richmond. In 1893, Calisch's congregation felt the need for a more modern prayer ritual. They authorized Calisch to revise a prayer book. It was the first Hebrew book printed in Richmond.

In 1908, Calisch earned a Ph.D. from the University of Virginia.

In 1915 Calisch gave a speech in support of women's suffrage from the steps of the state capitol.

He was an executive member of the American Jewish Committee, the Jewish Welfare Board, the Joint Distribution Committee and the Virginia War History Commission.

In 1945, Calisch retired.
