= The Black Gang =

American musical group

- Also known as: The Black Gang Crew (Baiza/Hodges lineup)
- Origin: San Pedro, California
- Genres: Punk rock
- Years active: 1997–present (currently on hiatus)
- Labels: Columbia, Kill Rock Stars, Clenchedwrench
- Members: Mike Watt; Nels Cline; Bob Lee
- Past members: Stephen Hodges; Joe Baiza; Steve Reed

The Black Gang was a rock music trio formed in 1997 by American musician Mike Watt to record and tour behind his second solo album, Contemplating The Engine Room (Columbia Records, 1997). Of all of the "project" (short-term bands) Watt has formed since the disbanding of Firehose in 1994, The Black Gang (named after Navy slang for sailors who work on a boat's or submarine's engine room) has gone through the most permutations of any of Watt's backing groups.

For the recording of the album in May 1997, Watt tapped guitarist Nels Cline (whom he had recorded and toured with on his previous solo album, Ball-Hog or Tugboat?) and sometime Tom Waits drummer Stephen Hodges. Commitments with the Geraldine Fibbers kept Cline from touring with Watt for most of the tour, and Watt hired Joe Baiza to replace him. Watt's longtime soundman since Firehose, Steve Reed, was officially added to the touring lineup as well. Reed sang backing vocals from behind the mixing board and played sound effects for some of the songs (via a CD-R), in addition to his normal sound engineering duties.

A one-time five-member version of the band with both Cline and Baiza playing guitar along with Watt, Hodges and Reed, played a one-off gig in Long Beach in 1998 that was recorded and later released as bonus download-only tracks on the 20th Anniversary vinyl release of ...Engine Room and as a separate digital-only album, Contemplating the Engine Room: Live at Jillian's, Long Beach '98 - Five-Man Opera.

Hodges left the band for other commitments and was replaced by Bob Lee in 1998, starting with a spring European tour. Baiza then departed The Black Gang after some work-related conflicts with Watt; Cline was by then able to rejoin the band for one last tour leg behind the album. To mark the occasion, Cline composed a new song, "This is a Prayer", which was debuted during his tour stint, and later immortalized on a 7-inch EP released on the Kill Rock Stars label.

After retiring the piece, Watt continued to play some gigs with the Cline/Lee Black Gang lineup. An intention by Watt to record a new album with this lineup was derailed by a near-fatal illness Watt suffered in January 2000, which would inspire his next solo album, The Secondman's Middle Stand.

Watt and Cline frequently play together as members of the improvisational jazz/punk ensemble Banyan, in between Cline's commitments with Wilco and as a solo artist, and Watt's own schedule with Iggy Pop & The Stooges and as a solo act.

Watt reformed the Nels Cline/Bob Lee version of The Black Gang for a new album, recorded in 2009 in a marathon three-day recording session. The album has yet to be released but was originally set for a 2015 release on Watt's own clenchedwrench label.

Watt and Hodges reunited when the latter was tapped to play drums with mssv, replacing Jim Keltner who had recorded with Watt and Mike Baggetta on the album Wall of Flowers but was averse to touring.
