= The Pair of Pliers =

The Pair Of Pliers is Mike Watt's second-longest running project band. It consisted of former Slovenly and current Red Krayola guitarist Tom Watson and drummer/saxophonist/harpist Vince Meghrouni as well as Watt himself. All three members shared vocal duties. Watson would also double on drums when Meghrouni would disembark from his drum kit to play saxophone and sing.

Watt formed the unit for a fall 1999 tour that he had taken without having an album to promote; his only intention for the tour, dubbed "Searchin' The Shed For Pliers", was to get himself out of the house after his pet cat, "The Man", died. The group's set list consisted of a mix of Watt originals from his days with The Minutemen and Firehose, as well as his first solo album Ball-Hog or Tugboat? and hand-picked cover versions.

After recovering from a near-fatal illness in the winter of 2000 - an incident that would inspire his third solo album The Secondman's Middle Stand - Watt reunited The Pair Of Pliers for a second fall tour, this time dubbed the "Enough With The Piss-Bag" tour. The tour was a short one by Watt standards (not even two months) because Watt had another commitment impending - playing as a member of J Mascis and the Fog on the former Dinosaur Jr frontman's first solo tour.

Watt intended to reconvene the Pair Of Pliers for the recording of an album but those sessions have yet to take place. Watson has gotten to work with Watt again since then as a member of another Watt project band, The Jom and Terry Show in 2001 and 2002, and will be rejoining Watt and The Secondmen drummer Raul Morales in a new project band, The Missingmen.
