= Jumpstarted Plowhards =

Alt rock band (e. 2017)

- Years active: 2017–present
- Labels: Recess Records
- Members: Mike Watt; Todd Congelliere

Jumpstarted Plowhards is an alternative rock band featuring Mike Watt (The Minutemen, fIREHOSE) and Todd Congelliere (F.Y.P, Toys That Kill).

Watt and Congelliere did an I-5 tour together and afterwards Watt asked Congelliere to do a project with him.

Their debut album, Round One, was released by Recess Records on October 4, 2019. Watt wrote fifteen tracks on bass to a click track and sent them to Congelliere who added guitars and vocals. Congelliere felt that a fifteen track album would be overly long so it was split into two albums worth of songs.

Round One features a different drummer on each track such as Hole drummer Patty Schemel, Jimmy Felix (Toys That Kill), and Watt's other musical partners George Hurley, Jerry Trebotic, Raul Morales and Nick Aguilar. Four more albums are planned with live gigs after the albums are all released.
