= The Crew of the Flying Saucer =

The Crew Of The Flying Saucer was former The Minutemen/Firehose bassist Mike Watt's second touring band, formed to continue touring behind his first solo album, 1995's Ball-Hog or Tugboat?. The band consisted of, along with Watt on bass and vocals, guitarist Nels Cline and two drummers, Vince Meghrouni and Michael Preussner. Meghrouni also doubled on saxophone. All three had played on various cuts on Ball-Hog....

It is the first and only touring unit in which Watt used two drummers. Watt believed at the time that when devising musical arrangements, he was giving too much for one drummer to do, so he decided to try two drummers. While the experiment worked sonically (as evidenced by a fan-traded live recording of a show from the tour's Charlottesville, VA stop), after two tour legs personal tensions between the two drummers were beginning to mount. Those two tour legs were the last ones he had scheduled at the time, so there was no question of having to cancel any shows due to a personnel change or breakup.

The Crew Of The Flying Saucer appeared on the Rock for Choice album O Come All Ye Faithful: Rock for Choice performing a cover of "The Little Drummer Boy" entitled "The Little Drummer Boys".

Watt did work with both Cline and Meghrouni again after the Crew Of The Flying Saucer had completed its run; Cline was the sole guitarist on Watt's second solo album Contemplating The Engine Room, and has toured and recorded with him as part of both another Watt project band, The Black Gang, and in the jazz/punk group Banyan. Meghrouni would participate in another Watt project band, The Pair Of Pliers, in 1999 and 2000.

== See also ==
- The Black Gang
- Banyan
- The Pair Of Pliers
- Ball-Hog or Tugboat?
