= Mike Watt + The Missingmen =

Punk rock trio

Mike Watt & The Missingmen
- Origin: San Pedro, California
- Years active: 2006–present
- Labels: Parabolica Records, Clenchedwrench, Merge Records
- Members: Mike Watt; Tom Watson; Raul Morales
- Website: Missingmen page on Mike Watt's Hoot Page

The Missingmen are an American punk rock trio fronted by Minutemen/Firehose/Stooges bassist Mike Watt. The band features Watt, guitarist Tom Watson (Slovenly, The Pair Of Pliers, The Jom And Terry Show, Red Krayola), and drummer Raul Morales (FYP, Killer Dreamer, The Leeches, Mike Watt and the Secondmen).

The band's name is a humorous reference to the fact that during a 2005 European tour behind Watt's album The Secondman's Middle Stand, neither of the original Secondmen (Pete Mazich and Jerry Trebotic) participated.

== History ==
Mike Watt had known Tom Watson since the 1980s when Watt's New Alliance Records label put out Slovenly's first records. Watt met Raul Morales through seeing him in the band Vinny Vegas.

The Missingmen began performing in the autumn of 2006, opening for M. Ward. Watt has stated his intention to record an album with the Missingmen since 2007, but no formal plans were made until 2009 when the group laid down the guitar and drum tracks for Hyphenated-man in New York during a planned break in an American tour by Watt. According to Watt's interviews with Guitar World and Bass Player, the album would feature short songs inspired by the paintings of Hieronymous Bosch. The album, first released in Japan in October 2010, is the first release on Watt's new independent record label Clenchedwrench.

On a 2009 tour with Dinosaur Jr, Watson and Morales performed without Watt under the moniker lou barlow + the missingmen. This lineup, fronted by Dinosaur Jr bassist and Sebadoh frontman Lou Barlow, performed material from Barlow's solo recordings. In 2010, The Missingmen performed on Lou Barlow's Sentridoh III album.

Nick Aguilar replaced Raul Morales for a fall 2019 Missingmen tour.
