= The Widow Babies =

American punk rock band

- Origin: Los Angeles, California
- Genres: Punk rock, Noise Rock
- Labels: Olfactory records
- Members: Danny Miller; Elise McCutchen; Neal Marquez; Tabor Allen

The Widow Babies were an American punk rock band from Los Angeles.

The band's debut album was a concept EP about Minutemen bassist Mike Watt fighting a vampire Abe Lincoln entitled The Mike Watt E.P. and featuring songs such as "Mike Watt Created The Universe With A Bass Solo". Mike Watt himself played the entire E.P. on an episode of The Watt from Pedro Show on October 19, 2008.

Their debut LP, entitled Jetpacks, was released on Olfactory records. Both albums were produced by Chris Schlarb.

In 2010 the band's MySpace page announced their demise saying "we are very sad to announce that The Widow Babies have broken up." Guitarist Danny Miller and drummer Tabor Allen reformed as Rare Grooves.

== Discography ==
- The Mike Watt E.P (2008)
- Jetpacks (2009)
