= The Watt from Pedro Show =

Music and interview podcast

The Watt From Pedro Show
- Genre: Music podcast, Interview
- Language: English

Cast and voices
- Hosted by: Mike Watt

Production
- Length: 3 hours

Publication
- Original release: May 19, 2001

Related
- Website: www.twfps.com

The Watt From Pedro Show is a music radio show and podcast hosted by bassist, vocalist and songwriter Mike Watt.

== Background ==
In the late 1990s, Watt began hosting a program on a Pirate radio station in Silver Lake, Los Angeles. After the FCC shut down the station, Watt's friends suggested he take his show online. The program debuted on May 19, 2001. On January 10, 2006, The Watt from Pedro Show became available as a podcast.

As of May 2019, the show has aired more than 500 episodes.

== Format ==
Each episode begins with a John Coltrane song then Watt and "Brother Matt" play "eclectic mix of underground music" (Watt refuses to play "mersh shit") and interview guests about their musical history and other topics.

Watt has interviewed Barrence Whitfield, Flea, Andrea Belfi and Stefano Pilia of Il Sogno del Marinaio, Sam McCandless, and Paul Leary among others.

== Reception ==
Orange County Register called it one of "5 musician-hosted podcasts we've got on heavy rotation" and Rolling Stone included it in "7 Musicians' Podcasts You Need to Hear."

== See also ==
- Music podcast
