= Hellride =

- Origin: 1990s
- Genres: punk rock, jazz, punk jazz
- Years active: 1990s to early 2000s

Hellride is an American music group formed in the 1990s by guitarist Peter DiStefano, bassist Mike Watt, and drummer Stephen Perkins. Hellride is a side project to the musicians' other full-time bands (Watt is active as a solo artist and former member of Minutemen and Firehose; DiStefano and Perkins were members of Porno for Pyros, with whom Watt occasionally played).

Hellride is exclusively a live band in the Los Angeles area, though fan recordings circulate with Watt and Perkins's blessing. Their entire set list is devoted to playing and reinterpreting the music of The Stooges in a jazz style inspired by iconic saxophonist John Coltrane. The band grew out of Watt and Perkins' more frequent collaborations in the jazz-punk improv group Banyan as well as Watt's brief stint as bassist with Porno for Pyros in 1996.

On separate occasions, Watt did a Hellride performance on Halloween 2003 with The Secondmen drummer Jerry Trebotic substituting for Perkins, who was on a Jane's Addiction reunion tour at the time. He also performed in a "Hellride East" line-up in New York City in 2000 and 2012 with Dinosaur Jr.'s J Mascis and Murph on guitar and drums respectively.

Watt went on to replace deceased bassist Dave Alexander in the reformed Stooges with original members Iggy Pop, Ron Asheton, and Scott Asheton.
