= Hyphenated-man =

Studio album by Mike Watt
- Released: October 6, 2010 (Japan); March 1, 2011 (rest of world)
- Recorded: May 2009 and June 2010
- Genre: Alternative rock
- Length: 47:12
- Label: Parabolica (Japan) clenchedwrench (rest of world)
- Producer: Mike Watt

Mike Watt chronology
The Secondman's Middle Stand (2004)	Hyphenated-man (2010)

Alternate cover
- Front cover of 2010 Japanese release

Professional ratings
Review scores
Source	Rating
Pitchfork	7.9/10
Rolling Stone	3.5/5 stars
Spin	6/10 stars

Hyphenated-man (stylized in all lowercase) is the fourth solo album by Mike Watt, and the first full-length recording he made under his own name since parting with Columbia Records in 2005. Initially released in Japan by Parabolica Records in October 2010, the album was released in the rest of the world on clenchedwrench, an independent record label newly founded by Watt. He is accompanied on the album by his Mike Watt + The Missingmen bandmates, guitarist Tom Watson and drummer Raul Morales.

== Writing and recording ==
The album is a loose concept album (Watt refers to it as his third "punk opera") of thirty short songs, all two minutes or under (most average about a minute and a half) inspired by creatures from the paintings of Hieronymous Bosch; each of the thirty song titles is derived from a nickname Watt came up with for each creature, "since I don't know three-hundred-year-old Dutch". According to Watt, the album "is quite different" from his previous punk operas Contemplating the Engine Room and The Secondman's Middle Stand "in that it has no standard narrative... meaning no regular beginning-middle-end." Another inspiration woven into the album's lyrics was taken from "the idea of Dorothy from The Wizard of Oz kind of tripping on what men do to 'be' men."

Musically, Watt was inspired to write short songs again after re-immersing himself in the back catalog of his first band, The Minutemen prior to and in the course of filming the documentary We Jam Econo. Watt had seen a parallel between the album's initial concept and The Minutemen in "how many little trips could roll up into one big one." Inspired by his earlier music Watt still wanted to take into account the changes in his life saying "I would write lyrics dealing with myself as a middle-aged punk rocker, which is something the Minutemen never dealt with really."

The music to all thirty songs was written by Watt on one of Watt's late friend and Minutemen bandmate D. Boon's Fender Telecasters.

I wrote the whole thing on D. Boon’s Telecaster. I’m not that much of a guitar player, but I did it on purpose so the bass would come second. I was doing all these things so it wouldn’t be too much Minutemen, because I was feeling guilty about ripping my old band off, you know? There’s too much of that shit going on already. I don’t have to be another one doing that. So what I did is I tried to use that as like an appropriated thing, to make a new thing.

During their Minutemen days, Mike said he wrote very few songs on a guitar. "I mainly composed on bass. It’s still like that with me,” he said. “Writing for the Missingmen using a guitar makes this project pretty unique for Tom and me. Tom should get much respect for interpreting my stumblebum guitar playing. He’s amazing, truly."

The guitar and drum tracks were recorded in three days in May 2009 during a planned break in a tour Watt undertook with the Missingmen, at Studio G in Brooklyn, New York, the studio of ex-Pere Ubu bassist Tony Maimone. Watson and Morales recorded their parts without the benefit of having heard the bass line or vocals first. Watt overdubbed his vocals and bass parts thirteen months later.

== Track listing ==
1. Arrow-Pierced-Egg-Man
2. Beak-Holding-Letter-Man
3. Hammering-Castle-Bird-Man
4. Bird-In-The-Helmet-Man
5. Belly-Stabbed-Man
6. Stuffed-In-The-Drum-Man
7. Baby-Cradling-Tree-Man
8. Hollowed-Out-Man
9. Finger-Pointing-Man
10. Own-Horn-Blowing-Man
11. Fryingpan-Man
12. Head-And-Feet-Only-Man
13. Shield-Shouldered-Man
14. Cherry-Head-Lover-Man
15. Pinned-To-The-Table-Man
16. Mouse-Headed-Man
17. Antlered-Man
18. Confused-Parts-Man
19. Bell-Rung-Man
20. Boot-Wearing-Fish-Man
21. Thistle-Headed-Man
22. Funnel-Capped-Man
23. Blowing-It-Out-Both-Ends-Man
24. Jug-Footed-Man
25. Lute-And-Dagger-Man
26. Mockery-Robed-Man
27. Hill-Man
28. Hell-Building-Man
29. Man-Shitting-Man
30. Wheel-Bound-Man

== Personnel ==
- Mike Watt – vocals, bass, songwriter, producer
- Tom Watson – guitars
- Raul Morales – drums
- Tony Maimone – engineer, mixer
