= Il Sogno del Marinaio =

Experimental rock trio

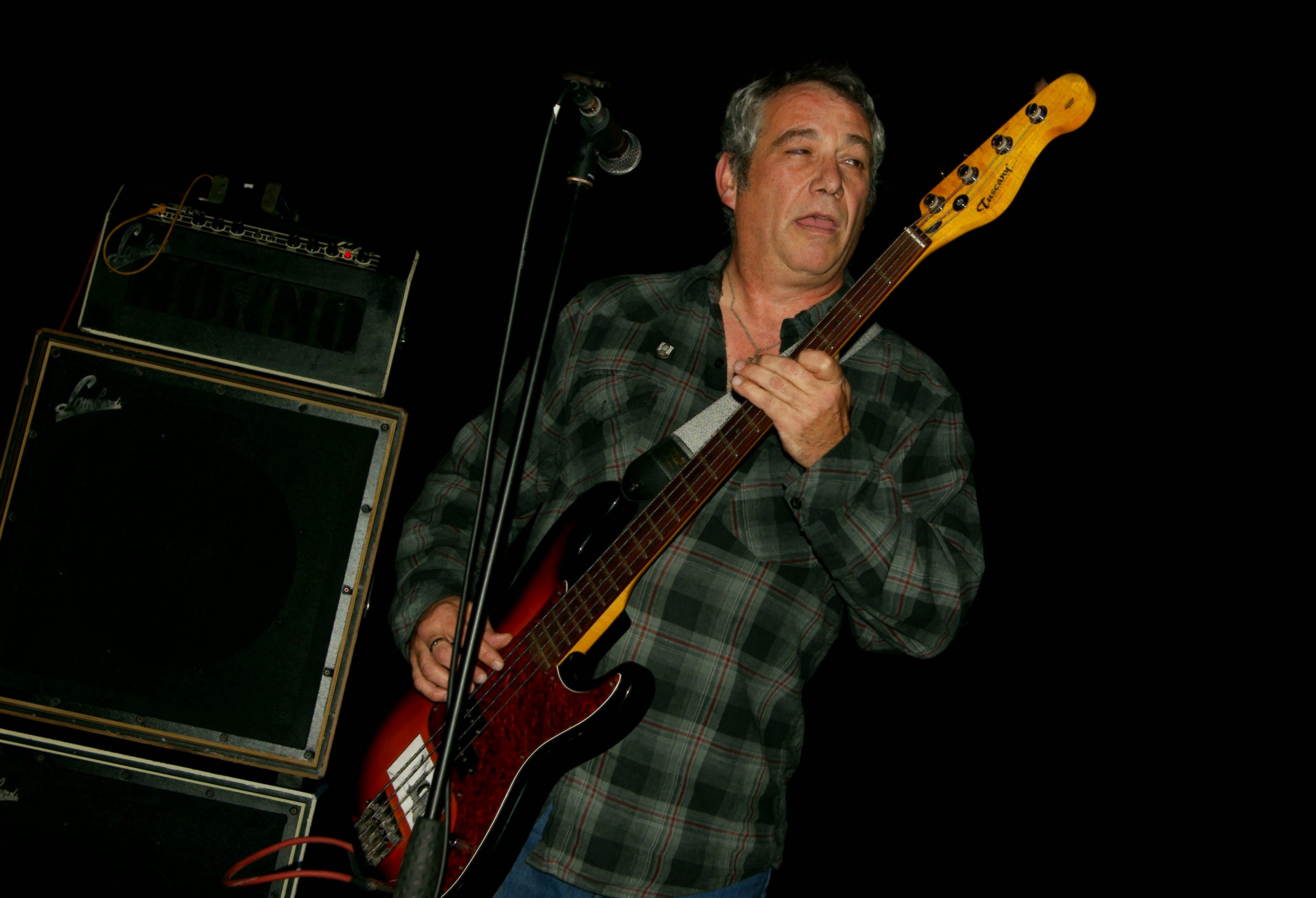
- Mike Watt performing with Il Sogno del Marinaio in 2013

Background information
- Origin: Florence, Italy
- Genres: Experimental rock
- Years active: 2009–present
- Labels: clenchedwrench; Org Music; Improved Sequence
- Members: Mike Watt; Stefano Pilla; Paolo Mongardi
- Past members: Andrea Belfi
- Website: ilsognodelmarinaio.wordpress.com

Il Sogno del Marinaio (Italian for The Sailor's Dream) is an experimental rock trio founded in 2009. The band consists of Mike Watt on bass guitar and vocals, Stefano Pilla on guitar and vocals, and Paolo Mongardi on drums. The band has released two studio albums on clenchedwrench: La busta gialla (2013) and Canto Secondo (2014) and a third, Terzo (2024) on Improved Sequence.

== History ==
=== Formation (2005–2009) ===
Stefano Pilla and Mike Watt first met in 2005 while Watt was on tour in Italy with Raul Morales and Paul Roessler. Pilla was acting as a road manager for the three musicians. Pilla and Watt kept in contact and, later in November 2009, Pilla invited Watt to Florence where Pilla introduced Watt to his friend, drummer Andrea Belfi. Watt decided to name the trio "Il Sogno del Marinaio," which translates to The Sailor's Dream. Watt chose an Italian name in honour of his mother's and band member's Italian heritage as well as his father's maritime service as a sailor. The band began a short tour of Italy almost immediately after its formation, and recorded its debut album La busta gialla between shows only a week after the band's inception.

=== La busta gialla (2009–2013) ===
The band's debut album, La busta gialla, was recorded in Varano Borghi, a small town in northern Italy, during its first tour of the country in 2009. The album was recorded in three days. The album was released on 29 January 2013 via clenchedwrench. Il Sogno del Marinaio took a tour of Europe during the spring of 2013 in support of La busta gialla. On 1 December, the band were chosen to participate in the All Tomorrow's Parties End of an Era Weekend 2 music festival curated by Loop.

=== Canto Secondo (2013–2016) ===
The day after the All Tomorrow's Parties festival, Il Sogno del Marinaio returned to the studio with producer Bruno Germano to record its second studio album. Canto Secondo was recorded at Vacuum Studio in Bologna, Italy between 3 December and 10 December 2013. Before the album's release, Il Sogno del Marinaio released a special limited edition 7 inch single of the songs "Mud Puddle" and "We Come to Learn" on the record label Org Music for Record Store Day in April 2014. The single was limited to 1200 copies worldwide. Canto Secondo was released on 26 August 2014 via clenchedwrench.

On 28 March 2016, Il Sogno del Marinaio announced a fall tour of Europe. The tour, entitled "Canto Secondo Tour 2016," was held between 28 September to 29 October 2016. Il Sogno del Marinaio played a show every night in a different European city during the tour. On 5 September 2016, the band released a music video for the song "Stucazz?!!".

=== Lineup change ===
In 2017, Andrea Belfi left the band to focus on solo material and drummer Paolo Mongardi was brought into the group for their "nuovo spirito tour 2017" which began in Amsterdam, Netherlands on September 20 and ended on October 22 in Nijmegen, Netherlands

=== Terzo (2020–present) ===
In April 2020, Mike Watt stated that Il Sogno del Marinaio was finishing up their third album, entitled Terzo.

== Discography ==
=== Studio albums ===
- La busta gialla (29 January 2013, clenchedwrench / Org Music)
- Canto Secondo (26 August 2014, clenchedwrench / Org Music)
- Terzo (5 May 2024, Improved Sequence)

=== EPs ===
- The Whistling EP (Record Store Day 2016, Org Music)

=== Singles ===
- "Mud Puddle" / "We Come to Learn" (19 April 2014, Org Music)
- "Stucazz?!!" (5 September 2016, clenchedwrench)
- "Song for Anima Mundi" (20 February 2024, Terzo)
- "Max Roach 8 Ball" (16 April 2024, Terzo)
- "Wing and a Prayer" (3 May 2024, Improved Sequence)
