= Mike Watt =

American musician (born 1957)

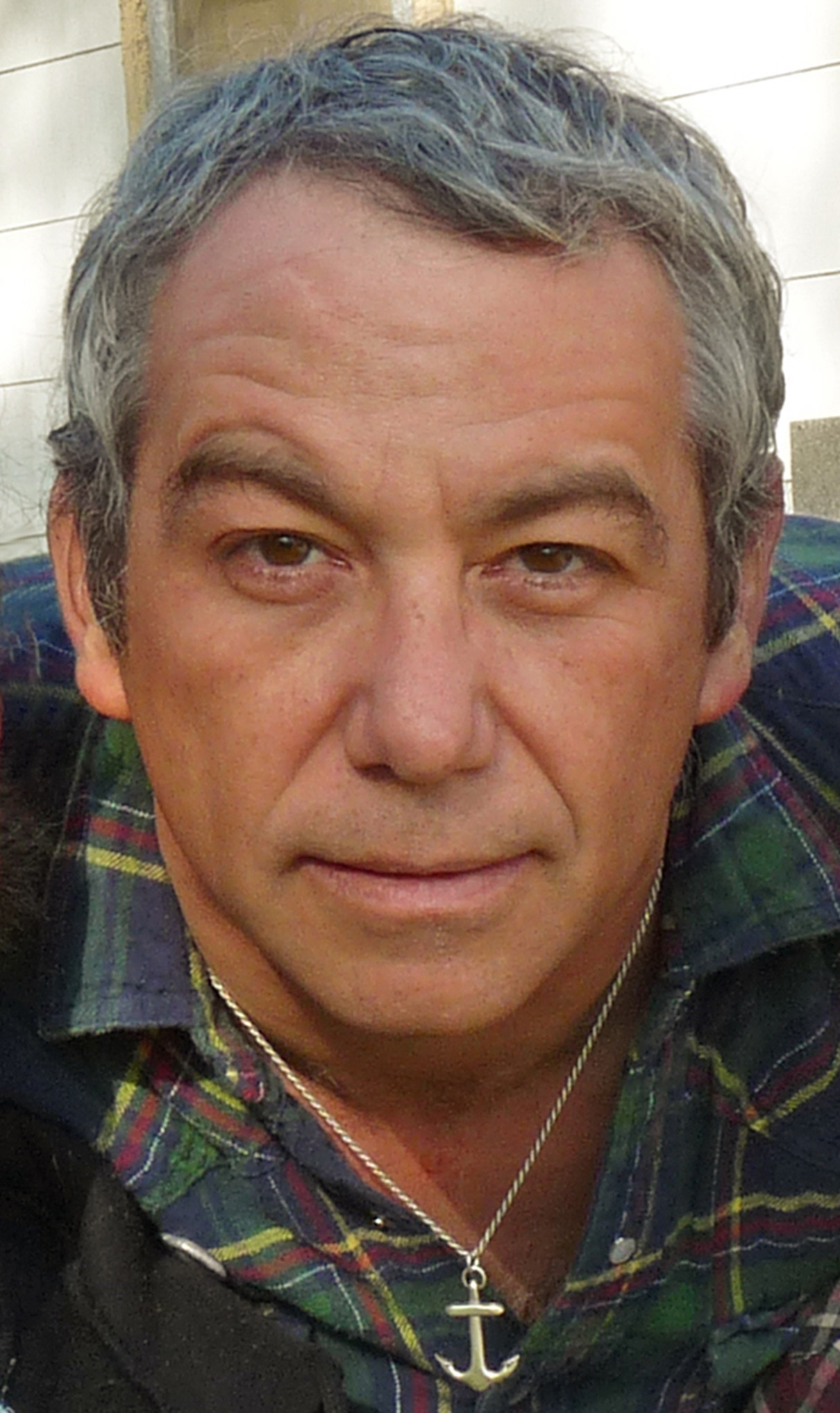
- Watt in 2009

Background information
- Born: Michael David Watt; December 20, 1957 (age 68); Portsmouth, Virginia, U.S.
- Genres: Punk rock; hardcore punk; post-punk; alternative rock; art rock
- Occupation: Musician
- Instruments: Bass; vocals
- Years active: 1978–present
- Labels: Columbia; SST; New Alliance; Kill Rock Stars; Org Music; Clenchedwrench
- Member of: Dos; Banyan; Hellride; Big Walnuts Yonder; Porno for Pyros; The Black Gang; Mike Watt + The Missingmen; The Secondmen; Unknown Instructors; Anywhere; Il Sogno del Marinaio; Funanori; Floored By Four; Flipper; mssv
- Formerly of: Minutemen; Firehose; The Reactionaries; Bootstrappers; J Mascis + The Fog; The Stooges; Tav Falco Panther Burns
- Website: mikewatt.com

Michael David Watt (born December 20, 1957) is an American bassist, vocalist and songwriter. He co-founded and played bass guitar for the rock bands Minutemen (1980–1985), Dos (1985–present), and Firehose (1986–1994). He began a solo career with the 1995 album Ball-Hog or Tugboat? and has since released three additional solo albums, most recently in 2010 with Hyphenated-man. He is also the frontman for the supergroup Big Walnuts Yonder (2008–present), a member of the art rock group Banyan (1997–present) and is involved with several other musical projects. From 2003 until 2013, he was the bass guitarist for The Stooges.

Watt has been called "one of the greatest bassists on the planet". CMJ New Music called Watt a "seminal post-punk bass player". Readers of NME voted Mike Watt one of the "40 Greatest Bassists of All Time" and LA Weekly awarded him the number six spot in "The 20 Best Bassists of All Time". In November 2008, Watt received the Bass Player Magazine lifetime achievement award, presented by Flea. The Red Hot Chili Peppers dedicated their best-selling album, 1991's Blood Sugar Sex Magik, to Watt.

== Biography ==
=== Early career ===
Watt was born in Portsmouth, Virginia. His father was a machinist's mate in the Navy and when he was young, Watt's family moved to San Pedro, California, where he became good friends with D. Boon. Watt and Boon picked up bass and guitar, respectively. Watt was a fan of T. Rex and Blue Öyster Cult, while Boon's exposure to rock music was limited to Creedence Clearwater Revival, another Watt favorite.

=== The Minutemen ===
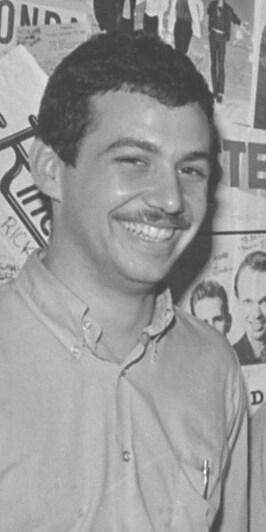
Watt in 1982

In 1978, Watt and Boon formed a band called The Reactionaries with drummer George Hurley and vocalist Martin Tamburovich. The band later became Minutemen with another drummer named Frank Tonche, who only lasted two shows with the group; Hurley, who had been in the short-lived new wave group Hey Taxi! at the time Minutemen first formed, rejoined Watt and Boon. After signing with SST Records in 1980, Minutemen began touring constantly, releasing a number of albums along the way. Their music was based on the speed, brevity, and intensity of punk, but included elements of jazz, folk, and funk.

Born with Osgood–Schlatter disease, Watt had surgeries on both knees in the early 1980s which limited touring in 1981. Watt wrote all of the music for What Makes a Man Start Fires? as he was laid up after one of his knee surgeries, living with his mother at the time and needed to keep himself occupied.

In 1984, Watt met Black Flag bassist Kira Roessler during a Black Flag/Minutemen tour. They soon became romantically involved, and subsequently began collaborating on songs, including material on Minutemen's final album 3-Way Tie (For Last). They also formed a two-bass duo, Dos, and have since recorded and released three records.

Minutemen ended tragically on December 22, 1985, when Boon was killed in an automobile crash at the age of 27 while driving to Arizona with his girlfriend. Their fifth full-length album, 3-Way Tie (For Last), had already been scheduled for release at the time of the accident. In the documentary film We Jam Econo, Watt mentioned that the last time he saw Boon, he had received lyrics for 10 songs from critic and songwriter Richard Meltzer for a planned collaboration with Minutemen. Minutemen were also planning to record a triple album with the working title 3 Dudes, 6 Sides, 3 Studio, 3 Live as way to counteract bootleggers.

=== Firehose ===
After Boon's death, Watt was profoundly depressed; he and Hurley initially intended to quit music altogether. Sonic Youth invited Watt to hang out with them in New York City in 1986; they recorded a cover of Madonna's "Burnin' Up" (with additional guitars by Greg Ginn) on the first Ciccone Youth EP, and Watt played bass for two songs on the Sonic Youth album Evol. Watt cites this period as critical in inspiring his post-Minutemen career saying, "The first thing I did was Thurston asked me to play bass on Evol. That was a big highlight, man. Like, 'What, you want me to play without D. Boon?'"

Subsequently, Ed Crawford, a Minutemen fan who drove to San Pedro from Ohio, persuaded the Watt/Hurley rhythm section to continue playing music. Firehose was formed soon after. Following three releases on SST, Firehose was signed to Columbia Records by A&R man Jim Dunbar. Shortly after the release of 1993's Mr. Machinery Operator, the band decided to call it quits.

Watt and Kira married in 1987, but their marriage ended not long after Firehose's break-up. However, both their friendship and Dos have remained intact; they even recorded their third album, Justamente Tres, not long after their divorce.

=== Solo career ===
After working with Firehose, Watt began a solo career. His first album, Ball-Hog or Tugboat?, featured appearances from dozens of musicians (many were Watt's peers from the 1980s SST era), including Henry Rollins, Eddie Vedder, J Mascis, Carla Bozulich, Evan Dando, members of Sonic Youth, Red Hot Chili Peppers, Frank Black, Nirvana, Soul Asylum, Jane's Addiction, the Beastie Boys and the Screaming Trees. The album and its supporting tour were Watt's first taste of mainstream fame, when Vedder and Dave Grohl of Nirvana were part of his touring group. After Vedder returned to his Pearl Jam commitments and Grohl began working with his new band Foo Fighters, Watt formed his only four-piece touring group to date, The Crew Of The Flying Saucer, featuring guitarist Nels Cline and two drummers.

In 1996, Watt contributed bass guitar on two songs for Porno for Pyros' second album, Good God's Urge, filling in for Martyn LeNoble who quit the band during recording sessions. Watt subsequently ended up being the bassist for the band's tour that followed the release of the album.

He made an appearance in an episode of Cartoon Network's Space Ghost Coast to Coast.

In 1997, Watt released Contemplating the Engine Room, a punk rock song cycle using naval life as an extended metaphor for both Watt's family history (the album has a picture of his father in his Navy uniform on the cover) and the Minutemen. The album, which was critically well received, features the trio of musicians Nels Cline on guitar, Stephen Hodges on drums, and Watt as the only singer.

Watt went on to play in such groups as Banyan (with Stephen Perkins and Nels Cline) and Hellride, a sometime live outfit that plays cover versions of Stooges songs. He also played in Wylde Ratttz with Sonic Youth's Thurston Moore and The Stooges' Ron Asheton, recording a song for the film Velvet Goldmine. Watt also recorded a bass line to send to the Pennsylvania space-folk band The Clubber Lang Gang for their record Now Here This, on the track "For the Broken People". Starting in mid-2011, Watt began playing bass for a psychedelic/progressive rock band called Anywhere with the Mars Volta's Cedric Bixler-Zavala and Christian Eric Beaulieu of Triclops! In 2015 Mike Watt joined the Waywords and Meansigns project, a collaborative project setting James Joyce's Finnegans Wake to music.

=== Illness, recovery and The Stooges ===
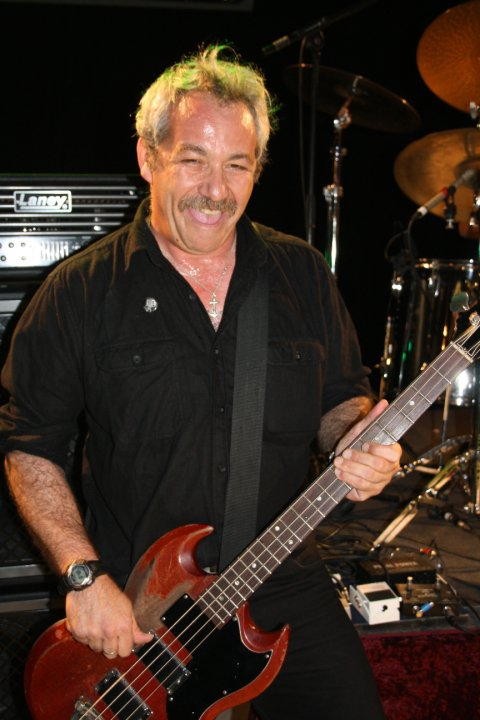
Watt performing with Iggy and the Stooges at an ATP Festival in Minehead in 2010.

In January 2000, Watt fell ill with an infection of his perineum, forcing him into emergency surgery and nine weeks of bedrest in his San Pedro apartment. Initially unable to play his bass, he rebuilt his strength with intense practice as well as live club gigs where he performed sets of Stooges covers with Hellride in California and with J Mascis and Dinosaur Jr. drummer Murph in New York City under the name Hellride East.

In 2000, Mascis asked Watt to participate in a world tour behind Mascis' first post-Dinosaur Jr. release, J Mascis and the Fog's More Light. At several of the shows, Ron Asheton formerly of The Stooges joined Mascis and Watt onstage, wherein the group would play entire sets of Stooges songs. Watt and Mascis later joined Asheton and his brother, Stooges drummer Scott Asheton, for a one-time-only performance at a Belgian festival under the name Asheton, Asheton, Mascis & Watt. In 2001, Watt was one of several bassists invited to participate in the sessions for Gov't Mule's The Deep End, partly on the recommendation of Primus' Les Claypool. Watt and Gov't Mule recorded a cover version of Creedence Clearwater Revival's "Effigy" for the album. The sessions were immortalized in the documentary feature film Rising Low.

In 2002, Watt, along with Pete Yorn and members of The Hives, backed Iggy Pop for a short set of Stooges songs at that year's Shortlist Music Prize ceremony, after which Watt was asked to play bass in the reunited Stooges lineup in 2003. The reunited Stooges played their first show in almost 20 years at the Coachella Valley Music and Arts Festival in May 2003.

=== The Secondman's Middle Stand ===
Watt's third solo album The Secondman's Middle Stand, inspired by both his 2000 illness and one of his favorite books, Dante's The Divine Comedy, was released in 2004; one reviewer writes that the album is a "harrowing, funny, and genuinely moving stuff from a true American original". For the first time since the Minutemen, Watt recorded the album with an "all-Pedro band", Mike Watt and the Secondmen, consisting of organist Pete Mazich and drummer Jerry Trebotic, along with former that dog. vocalist Petra Haden.

While promoting and touring behind The Secondman's Middle Stand, Watt announced plans for future recordings, stating that he intended to record as frequently as he did in the Minutemen days for as long as he could.

Watt would part amicably with Columbia/Sony BMG in 2005, after 14 years as both a solo artist and as one-third of Firehose.

=== Unknown Instructors ===
In 2005, another side project featuring Watt came to light with the announced September 20 release of The Way Things Work, an album of improvised music under the group name, Unknown Instructors with George Hurley, Saccharine Trust's Joe Baiza and Jack Brewer, and poet/saxophonist Dan McGuire. A month after the album's release, the Unknown Instructors recorded a second album, The Master's Voice, with Pere Ubu frontman David Thomas and artist Raymond Pettibon joining the core quartet of Watt, Hurley, McGuire and Baiza. A third album with the same lineup, Funland, was released in 2009 and features a semi-cover version (the original lyrics over new music) of Captain Beefheart's "Frownland" (from the Trout Mask Replica album). Basic tracks have already been laid down for the fourth Unknown Instructors album at Secondmen organist Pete Mazich's Casa Hanzo studio in San Pedro.

Watt would further his interest in improvised music by forming a trio, Los Pumpkinheads, with former Beastie Boys keyboardist Money Mark and Caroline Bermudez.

On December 14, 2005, the McNally-Smith College of Music in Saint Paul, Minnesota announced the formation of the Mike Watt Bass Guitar Scholarship, which is to be awarded annually to a bass major starting in the Fall of 2006.

In March 2006, Watt took part in the performance at Disney Hall, Los Angeles, of Glenn Branca's "Hallucination City" Symphony #13.

=== The Weirdness ===
In October 2006, Watt joined the rest of The Stooges at recording engineer Steve Albini's Electrical Audio Studio in Chicago, Illinois to record The Weirdness, the first Stooges studio album since 1973's Raw Power. The album was released on March 6, 2007, and much of Watt's 2007 was devoted to Stooges duties, including the band's first full-length U.S. tour since the band's reformation.

Watt also worked on two other projects during this time period: Funanori, a musical collaboration with Kaori Tsuchida, guitarist of The Go! Team, on shamisen and other instruments, and Pelicanman (named after the closing track on The Secondman's Middle Stand) with Petra Haden. The first three songs recorded by Watt and Tsuchida as Funanori were released on a split EP with Tokyo band LITE in the summer of 2007 by Transduction Records. Watt also contributed a cover of Blue Öyster Cult's "Burning For You", recorded with Haden, Nels Cline, Money Mark Nishita, and Red Hot Chili Peppers drummer Chad Smith, to the all-star compilation album Guilt by Association, released in August by the independent label Engine Room Recordings.

On June 9, 2007, Watt was the live narrator for the silent movie Brand Upon the Brain! at the Egyptian Theatre in Hollywood, California.

=== Big Walnuts Yonder ===
Big Walnuts Yonder is an American supergroup formed in 2008 consisting of bassist/vocalist Watt, guitarist Nels Cline from Wilco, drummer Greg Saunier from Deerhoof, and guitarist/vocalist Nick Reinhart from Tera Melos. They released their debut album in March 2017 through Sargent House.

=== Clenchedwrench label, Floored by Four, and Firehose reunion ===
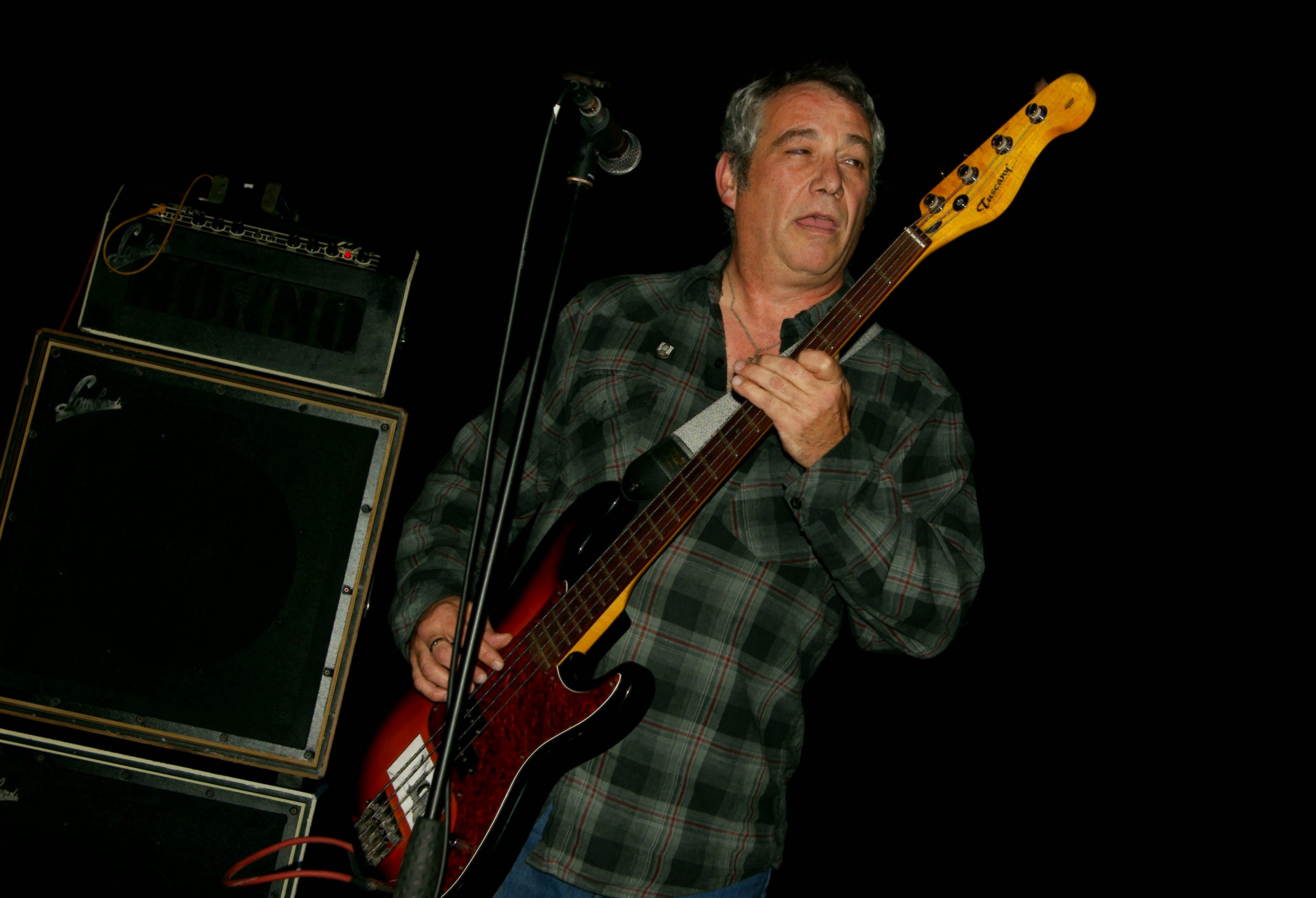
Mike Watt, 2013.

Watt reunited with the final Black Gang lineup of Nels Cline and Bob Lee to record a new album, tentatively titled My Shibun No Hi, in 2008. No release date has yet been set for the album.

Continuing his exploration of both improvised music and the Japanese independent music scene, Watt, along with Nels Cline and producer Kramer, formed Brother's Sister's Daughter with mi-gu members Shimizu "Shimmy" Hirotaka and Yuko Araki to do a two-week tour of the country in late 2008 and record an album afterward. The album was mixed down by Hirotake but has not lined up a label or release date yet. Since then, two more albums by the band have been recorded but have yet

Watt and Cline teamed up in New York to form Floored by Four with ex-Cibo Matto keyboardist Yuka Honda and Lounge Lizards drummer Dougie Bowne. The group debuted at Central Park Summerstage on August 1, and recorded their first self-titled album right afterward. The album was released in late September 2010 on Sean Lennon's Chimera Music label. Honda would later rejoin Watt and Cline for a second Brother's Sister's Daughter tour and album session in Japan (Cline and Honda became romantically involved – and subsequently engaged to be married – during the course of these projects).

Watt is interviewed in the 2009 documentary film Live House, about the underground music scene in Japan.

Watt is using his clenchedwrench label to put out some other long-awaited recording projects from the stockpile he has accumulated over the past few years, starting with the fourth Dos album (Dos y Dos, released July 16, 2011), followed by the Spielgusher project with Richard Meltzer and mi-gu's Shimizu "Shimmy" Hirotaka and Yuko Araki (Spielgusher, released January 17, 2012) and two Il Sogno del Marinaio albums. Watt chose to start clenchedwrench after returning from his Japanese Hyphenated-man tour because "I've got so many proj[ect]s in the pipeline... and I want no hiccups with getting them out, so up goes my own freak flag flying."

Firehose's reunion was formally announced as part of the lineup of the 2012 Coachella Festival. The band underwent a short tour in April centered around both Coachella dates.

=== Il Sogno del Marinaio ===
In late November 2009, Watt traveled to Italy to tour and record at the invitation of Italian guitarist Stefano Pilia. The project band, Il Sogno Del Marinaio,(the name is Italian for The Sailor's Dream) did a short six-date tour, after which recording for an album (later entitled La Busta Gialla) took place.

The band is an experimental music trio consisting of Watt on vocals and bass guitar, Stefano Pilla on guitar and vocals, and Andrea Belfi on drums and vocals. The band has released two studio albums on clenchedwrench: La busta gialla (2013) and Canto Secondo (2014).

=== Hyphenated-Man ===
Watt recorded his first post-Columbia solo album, Hyphenated-man, in two sessions 13 months apart, with The Missingmen at Studio G, the New York studio of former Pere Ubu bassist Tony Maimone. Hypnenated-man consists of 30 short songs inspired by the paintings of Hieronymus Bosch. The first session for the album took place during a planned break in Watt's Spring 2009 tour, during which, in a deliberate move, only the drum and guitar tracks were completed. Watt overdubbed his vocal and bass tracks with Maimone in June 2010. The album was released in Japan by Parabolic Records on October 6, 2010, and Watt undertook his first tour of the country as a solo artist in support of it (before his work with Brother's Sister's Daughter, he previously toured there as a sideman with J Mascis and as one-fifth of The Stooges). A release of the album for the rest of the world took place on Watt's newly established clenchedwrench label on March 1, 2011, with an accompanying 51-date US/Canadian tour occurring between March 10 and April 30.

=== CUZ ===
In 2006, Watt met Sam Dook of The Go! Team at Big Day Out. The two continued emailing and decided to form a band. They recorded some sessions in 2008 while Watt was touring Europe and finished the album over email. The album, entitled Tamatebako, was released in 2014 under the band name CUZ and features guest vocals by Charles Plymell, DJ Scotch Egg, and fellow Go! Team member Kaori Tsuchida. The album title references the mysterious box of Japanese legend. A tour in 2015 followed.

=== The Hand to Man Band ===
In 2010, Thollem McDonas, John Dieterich, Tim Barnes, and Watt formed an experimental improvisational supergroup. Their debut album, You Are Always On Our Minds, was released in 2012.

=== The Island ===
Watt and S. Howe of the band Schooner formed an experimental music project called The Island and released Listening to the Warning in 2011 and Lamia in 2018.

=== Hidden Rifles ===
In 2014, Watt joined with Mark Shippy (U.S. Maple), Jim Sykes (Invisible Things), Matthew Wascovich (Scarcity Of Tanks), and Norman Westberg (Swans) to form the art rock project band Hidden Rifles. Their debut album, Across The Neighborhoods, was released in October 2017.

=== Afternoon Freak ===
Along with keyboardist Matt Mottel and percussionist Danny Frankel, Watt formed the trio Afternoon Freak and released the album The Blind Strut in 2018. The album was recorded in one day on January 14, 2017, at BIG EGO studios.

=== Tone Scientists ===
In 2018, Watt joined with Bucky Pope, John Herndon, Vince Meghrouni, and Pete Mazich to form the project band Tone Scientists. A 7-inch consisting of a Bucky Pope original entitled "Nuts" and a cover of Sun Ra's "Tiny Pyramids" was released on Record Store Day 2018 by Org Music.

=== Jumpstarted Plowhards ===
In 2019, Watt joined Todd Congelliere to form Jumpstarted Plowhards. Their debut album, Round One, was recorded for release on October 4, 2019, with Recess Records. Drums are handled by a rotating roster including former Minutemen and fIREHOSE bandmate George Hurley, Hole drummer Patty Schemel, The Secondmen's Jerry Trebotic and The Missingmen's Raul Morales.

The band plans to record five LPs before playing live.

=== Fitted ===
Initially formed as a one-off group for Wire's Drill festival in Los Angeles, Watt, Graham Lewis (Wire), Matthew Simms (Wire), and Bob Lee (The Black Gang) formed Fitted and decided to stay together and record.

The debut album, First Fits, was released in November 2019.

=== mssv ===
Watt played bass with guitarist Mike Baggetta and drummer Jim Keltner for Baggetta's Wall of Flowers album in March 2019. Watt joined Baggetta for a ten date March tour with Stephen Hodges substituting for Keltner.

The resulting trio named themselves mssv and recorded a live album entitled Live Flowers. A studio album entitled Main Steam Stop Valve followed in 2020.

=== Three-Layer Cake ===
In 2021, Watt with percussionist Mike Pride and guitarist Brandon Seabrook formed Three-Layer Cake and released an album, Stove Top, on RareNoiseRecords.

=== Flipper ===
Mike Watt was recruited by Flipper's Ted Falconi and Stephen DePace to play bass for a 2019 summer European tour with David Yow (The Jesus Lizard, Scratch Acid) substituting for the retired Bruce Loose and the otherwise engaged then-current Flipper bassist, Rachel Theole. The shows were billed as Flipper with Yow and Watt.

In 2022, Flipper announced that they would tour again, with Watt returning on both bass and lead vocals. A European tour was announced, but cancelled due to COVID-19 concerns. The band then quickly booked an autumn US tour with the same lineup.

=== Guest appearances ===
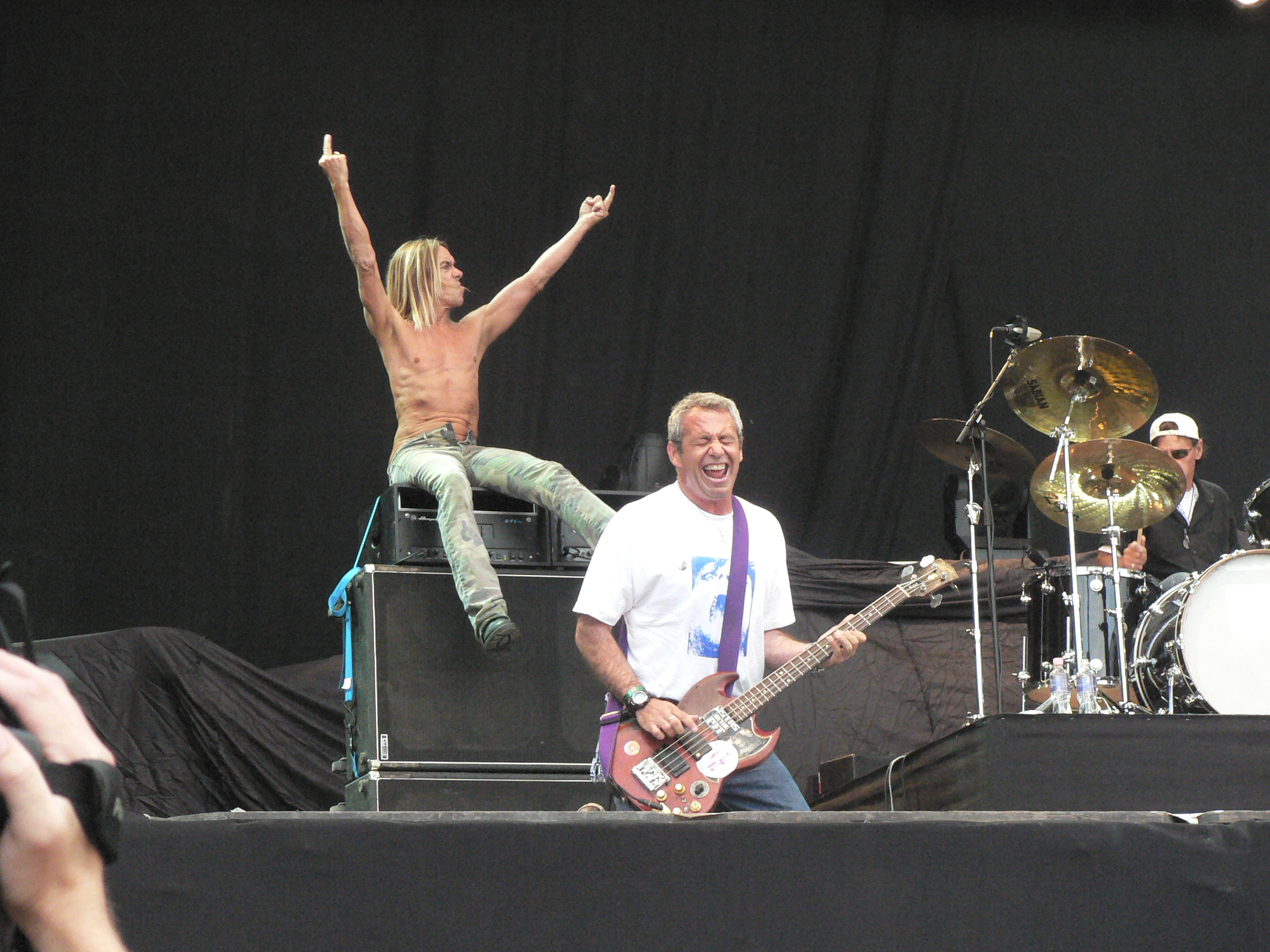
Mike Watt and Iggy Pop at Sziget, 2006

In November 2006, Watt revealed to Pitchfork Media that he recorded for an album by singer Kelly Clarkson, a studio assignment that he took at the invitation of his "old friend", producer/engineer David Kahne. Clarkson's My December album was released in 2007.

Watt and drummer Stephen Hodges joined violinist Chris Murphy for "Blues for Bukowski" on his Murphy's album Luminous. Hodges had previously worked with Watt on Contemplating the Engine Room.

Watt appeared on the track "Moon Burnt Mountain" on Anywhere II by Anywhere.

Watt played bass on two tracks for the Black Flag tribute album Gimmie Gimmie Gimmie: Reinterpreting Black Flag alongside Dez Cadena and Keith Morris.

In 2018, Black Moth Super Rainbow released a 7-inch for Record Store Day with Watt and Flea covering "Drippy Eye". Watt had earlier appeared on the song "Black Yogurt" on Black Moth Super Rainbow's Drippers EP in 2008. The same year Watt appeared on Macedonia's Bernays Propaganda song "Ništo Nema da ne Razdeli" for the Songs From Under the Floorboard, Vol. 1 compilation album put out by DJ Dave Cantrell. The album is a charitable compilation with proceeds going to Planned Parenthood.

Watt also appeared on a split 7-inch with MB Jones playing on the song "Jail for Trees" in April 2018.

In October 2018, Watt joined Abby Travis, Keith Morris, Flea, Jennifer Finch, Chip Kinman and others for a spoken word engagement at the Roxy Theatre entitled War Stories: Tales of 70's & 80's Punk Mayhem Told By The Perpetrators Themselves.

In 2019, Watt appeared with Macedonian jazz guitarist Toni Kitanovski on the track "Nisto nema da ne' razdeli" for Bernays Propaganda's 2019 release, Vtora mladost, treta svetska vojna (2nd Youth, 3rd World War) The track was also donated to Songs From Under the Floorboard, Vol. 1, proceeds of which go to Planned Parenthood.

In 2025, Watt joined post-punk band, Break to Broken for a guest appearance playing bass on the track "No Care". The track was part of a 3-song 7" record called "No Care + 2" released via UK label, Engineer Records on July 15, 2025.

Watt has said he generally charges no fee to play on somebody's album saying "All payment is not in the coin...Anytime you play, you're investing in the next time you play."

=== Literary endeavors ===
In 2003, Watt's first book, Spiels Of A Minuteman, was released by the Quebec book publisher L'Oie De Cravan. The book, printed in both English and French, contains all of Watt's song lyrics from the Minutemen era as well as the tour journal he wrote during the Minutemen's only European tour with Black Flag, essays by former SST co-owner Joe Carducci, Sonic Youth's Thurston Moore, and Blue Öyster Cult lyricist and longtime Watt hero Richard Meltzer, and illustrations by Raymond Pettibon that had been used in all of the Minutemen's album artwork.

Watt published his second book in 2012. Entitled Mike Watt: On and Off Bass, the book is a photo memoir featuring photos taken by Watt coupled with excerpts from Watt's Stooges tour diaries mixed with free verse poems.

In 2016, Watt contributed a chapter to John Doe's memoir Under The Big Black Sun: A Personal History of L.A. Punk.

=== James Joyce ===
Watt has long been a fan of James Joyce having first discovered Ulysses while playing with Minutemen on a European tour with Black Flag. He credits reading Joyce with helping him process the loss of D. Boon and he used it as inspiration when writing Contemplating the Engine Room.

Watt has said that Joyce's stream-of-consciousness style directly influenced Double Nickels on the Dime with songs like "June 16th", which is the date of Bloomsday. Watt attended the 2004 Bloomsday celebration in Dublin and claimed that it was the first time he went to a town without having to perform a gig. Watt attended Bloomsday again in 2008 while touring with The Stooges.

In 2008, Watt was invited to contribute music to an adaptation of Joyce's Chamber Music released by Fire Records

In 2017, Watt participated in an international project setting Joyce's Finnegans Wake to music entitled Waywords and Meansigns It was released on May 4, 2017, to coincide with the 76th anniversary of the book's first publication.

=== The Watt from Pedro Show ===
When he is not on tour, Watt hosts a regular internet radio show, The Watt from Pedro Show, a continuation of a program Watt had first done on a low-power FM station in the late 1990s. The program debuted on May 19, 2001, and became so popular with Watt's fans that the website's host, Sightworks, temporarily forced the show offline on weekdays until a sponsor or other solution could be found. On January 10, 2006, The Watt from Pedro Show became available as a podcast.

=== Porno for Pyros ===
Watt reconnected with Porno for Pyros in 2023 for a tour that was postponed while they finished a new single "Little Me", and is currently on that rescheduled tour; 2024's Horns, Thorns En Halos Farewell Tour, in support of that single and the back catalog.

== Equipment ==
Watt's first bass was a Kay he purchased for $100. He played a Fender Precision Bass formerly owned by Fear bassist Derf Scratch on What Makes A Man Start Fires?

For most of his fIREHOSE tenure, Watt played a 1956 Fender Precision Bass. From 1995 until 1999, Watt predominately played a non-reverse Gibson Thunderbird which he altered with a Bartolini pre-amp and Grover tuning machines.

Following his 2000 illness, Watt switched to short-scale basses for live work. Watt played a 1963 Gibson EB-3 until it was stolen while on tour with The Stooges. After the theft, Watt was gifted with a 1969 Gibson EB-3 and a Gibson EB-0.

More recently, Watt plays a signature "Wattplower" bass he designed with Reverend Musical Instruments. In early 2020, it was announced that a "Mark II" iteration of the bass would be released.

== Bibliography ==
- Spiels of a minuteman by Mike Watt (Montreal: L'Oie de Cravan, 2003) ISBN 978-2-922399-20-2
- Mike Watt: On and Off Bass by Mike Watt (New York: Three Rooms Press, 2012) ISBN 978-0983581307

== Discography ==
Minutemen

- Minutemen discography

fIREHOSE

- fIREHOSE discography

Dos

- 1986 Dos (New Alliance)
- 1989 Numero Dos (12-inch EP) (New Alliance)
- 1989 Uno Con Dos (CD) (New Alliance)
- 1996 Justamente Tres (CD) (Kill Rock Stars)
- 2011 dos y dos (CD, LP) (Clenchedwrench / Org Music)

Crimony

- 1988 The Crimony EP (New Alliance)

The Stooges

- 2004 Live In Detroit (DVD) (Creem / MVD)
- 2005 "You Better Run" on The Songs Of Junior Kimbrough (Fat Possum)
- 2005 Telluric Chaos (Skydog)
- 2007 The Weirdness (Virgin)
- 2011 Raw Power Live: In the Hands of the Fans (Virgin)
- 2013 Ready to Die (Fat Possum)

Unknown Instructors

- 2005 The Way Things Work (Smog Veil Records)
- 2007 The Master's Voice (Smog Veil Records)
- 2009 Funland (Smog Veil Records)
- 2019 Unwilling To Explain (Org Music)

Floored by Four

- 2010 Floored by Four (Chimera Records)

Off With Their Heads

- 2011 Off With Their Heads/Discharge Split 7-inch (Drunken Sailor Records)

Steve Mackay

- 2009 Untitled EP (as Estel)
- 2011 Sometimes Like This I Talk
- 2011 North Beach Jazz

The Hand to Man Band

- 2012 You Are Always on Our Minds (Post-Consumer)

Anywhere

- 2012 Anywhere (ATP Recordings)

Mike Watt + the Missingmen

- 2013 Missing the Minutemen 10-inch
- 2015 Missing More of the Minutemen 10-inch

Il Sogno del Marinaio

- 2013 La busta gialla (Clenchedwrench / Org Music)
- 2014 Canto Secondo (Clenchedwrench / Org Music)
- 2024 Terzo (Improved Sequence)

CUZ

- 2014 Tamatebako (Bleeding Heart Recordings)

Brother's Sister's Daughter

- 2014 BSD

Mike Watt and the Secondmen

- 2015 Shit on Me / Striking Out (Org Music)
  - split 7-inch with E V Kain
- 2016 Back In The Microwave (Org Music)
  - split 7-inch with Chronics
- 2020 L.A. to Pedro EP (Nomad Eel Records)
  - split 7-inch with Zig Zags

Tav Falco Panther Burns

- 2016 "Me and My Chauffeur Blues" b/w "Whistle Blower Blues" (7" single) (Org Music / Frenzi)
- 2016 "Sway" b/w "Where the Rio De Rosa Flows" (7" single) (Org Music / Frenzi)

Big Walnuts Yonder

- 2017 Big Walnuts Yonder (Sargent House)

Hidden Rifles

- 2017 Across The Neighborhoods (Total Life Society)

Afternoon Freak

- 2018 The Blind Strut (Joyful Noise Recordings)

Tone Scientists

- 2018 Nuts b/w Tiny Pyramids 7-inch (Org Music)

Jumpstarted Plowhards

- 2019 Round One (Recess Records)

FITTED

- 2019 First Fits (Org Music)

mssv

- 2019 Live Flowers (Striped Light Records)
- 2020 Main Steam Stop Valve (BIG EGO Records)
- 2020 Media Kittens / When The Hoarding Has Ended (7-inch) (Improved Sequence)

Round Eye

- 2020 Culture Shock Treatment (Sudden Death Records) (Producer)

Three-Layer Cake

- 2021 Stove Top (RareNoiseRecords)

=== Solo albums ===
All solo albums were released on Columbia except where noted:

- 1995 Ball-Hog or Tugboat?
- 1997 Contemplating the Engine Room
- 2004 The Secondman's Middle Stand
- 2010/2011 Hyphenated-man (Parabolica Records [Japan]) / (Clenchedwrench/Org Music [elsewhere])
  - The clenchwrench release uses a different cover artwork than the Japanese issue.
- 2015 Watt: On Bass limited edition 5" vinyl
- 2016 "Ring Spiel" Tour '95
- 2017 Contemplating the Engine Room: Live in Long Beach '98

=== Guest appearances ===
- 1985: Saccharine Trust - Worldbroken
- 1986: Sonic Youth – "In the Kingdom #19," "Bubblegum"
- 1986: Stan Ridgway - "Can't Stop The Show"
- 1989: Ciccone Youth - "Burnin' Up (Mike Watt Original Demo)"
- 1992: Juliana Hatfield - "Get Off Your Knees"
- 1992: Peglegasus - "Burma Rhode"
- 1994: Dinosaur Jr. - "I Misunderstood"
- 1997: Porno for Pyros - "100 Ways," "Good God's://Urge!"
- 2008: Black Moth Super Rainbow - "Black Yogurt"
- 2016: Scarcity of Tanks - Ringleader Lies
- 2017: Scarcity of Tanks - Garford Mute
- 2018: Anywhere - "Moon Burnt Mountain"
- 2017 Tav Falco - A Tav Falco Christmas
- 2018: King Champion Sounds - "Smallest Tribe in the World"
- 2019: Scarcity of Tanks - Dissing The Reduction
- 2019 Bernays Propaganda - Vtora mladost, treta svetska vojna (2nd Youth, 3rd World War)
- 2020 Ivan the Tolerable - Out of Season
- 2021: Tav Falco - Club Car Zodiac
- 2021: Billions of Comrades - Our Hours
- 2023: Ivan the Tolerable - The Toft House Session
- 2024: Sun + Dead - Magic Drum

=== Promotional videos ===
As a solo artist

- 1995 "Big Train" – directed by Spike Jonze
- 1995 "Piss-Bottle Man" – directed by Roman Coppola
- 1997 "Liberty Calls" – directed by Spike Jonze
- 2004 "Tied A Reed 'Round My Waist" – directed by Lance Bangs
- 2004 "Drove up from Pedro" – directed by Mike Muscarella
- 2004 "Beltsandedman" – directed by Mike Muscarella
- 2004 "Burstedman" – directed by Mike Muscarella
- 2004 "Pelicanman" – directed by Mike Muscarella

with Sonic Youth

- 1990 "My Friend Goo" – cameo appearance
- 1991 "100%" – brief cameo appearance

with Sublime

- 1996 "Wrong Way" – Watt portrays a convenience store clerk

with The Jom and Terry Show

- 2001 Mike Watt & The Jom and Terry Show: Eyegifts From Minnesota – documentary directed by Bill Draheim

with Good Charlotte

- 2003 "Lifestyles of the Rich and Famous" – Watt portrays a jury foreman

with Cobra Verde (band)

- 2003 "Riot Industry" – Watt as "The Man In The Flannel Bathrobe".
- 2012 "Thrash Lab" – Watt discusses Punk Rock Video
