= Ljiljana Nikolovska =

Croatian singer (born 1964)

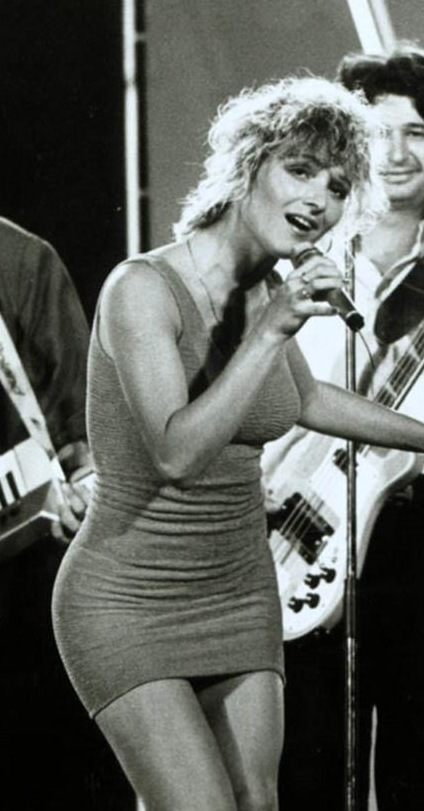
- Nikolovska with Magazin during 80s

Background information
- Born: Ljiljana Nikolovska; 24 August 1964 (age 62); Split, SR Croatia, SFR Yugoslavia
- Genres: Pop
- Occupation: Singer
- Years active: 1983–present
- Labels: Jugoton; Croatia Records
- Formerly of: Magazin
- Political party: Workers' Front

Ljiljana Nikolovska (Croatian pronunciation: [ʎǐʎana nikɔlɔ̌ʋskaː]; Macedonian: Љиљана Николовска, also spelled Nikolovski or Nikoloski; born 24 August 1964) is a Croatian/American singer who rose to prominence as the lead vocalist for the Split-based pop music act Magazin.

Born in Split, Nikolovska is of paternal Macedonian descent. She recorded eight albums, and appeared on numerous compilation albums with Magazin from 1982 to mid-1990 and other bands and projects to this day. She recorded a solo album in 1996 named Let for Croatia Records.

In 1991, Nikolovska flew from Belgrade to Los Angeles.

Since 1993, Nikolovska has been married to musician Pete Mazich. They have a son, named Tony, and live in San Pedro, California, United States, where they own a Recording Studio, record, play and co-produce projects with numerous musicians and bands of other nationalities. Nikolovska does mostly charity work and recordings that contribute to those in need (most noted for "Doctors Without Borders").

== Early life ==
Nikolovska was born to Macedonian father, Bora Nikolovski and mother Vera Nikolovska, who are originally from the village of Bituše. Her father moved to Split in order to serve in the army. In 2008, she shared her deepest concerns that Croatia chased her father away to the street after serving the country and doing so much for it. They were forcefully expelled out of their apartment by a Croatian official.

== 2010-2025: Political work and interviews ==
On 14 October 2015, Nikolovska appeared on the show N1 where she gave an interview to journalist Ivana Yarić. The show showed a brief recap of her music career and early music videos. She opened the interview saying how she travels back to Ex-Yu very rarely and only to see friends and relatives. She described her life in the US as very "normal". She shared she does not often travel back to her hometown of Split. She shared her view how her home is where her family is and her "family" is her son, husband, friends and family. At first, she was reluctant to receive an American citizenship, but later received it. She shared how she was on stage for a long time, both with her singing crew and with her acting crew. She shared how she was very overworked at the height of Magazin. Nikolovska shared how she was working for Bernie Sanders and shared her views and opinions on how Yugoslavia worked as something "the US wanted to imitate". She shared how health insurance, worker rights, sex equality were some of the values present in the country. Nikolovska shared the view how she considers that politics is everywhere around, from the price of everyday food to monthly salary.

In 2021, Nikolovska gave an interview with Portal Novosti, during which she shared that she misses Split that she does not recognize anymore and that she does not consider group Magazin to be a phenomenon.

== Private life ==
Nikolovska shared on her social media that she built a garden house together with her husband Pete Mazich.

Nikolovska has traveled to London, Paris, Moscow, Skopje and the village of Bituše, which her son Tony loves visiting. Nikolovska learnt French in school. She also speaks Croatian and English.

In an interview for Macedonian newspaper Utrinski vesnik, Nikolovska shared how she thinks that the best ajvar recipe comes from Bituše.

== Discography ==
Title	Year	Number of copies sold in first year	Notes
Kokolo	1983	182.000	export & videos not included
O, la, la	1984	23.000	export & videos not included
Piši mi ("Write to Me")	1985	480.000	export & videos not included
Put putujem ("I am Traveling")	1986	680.000	export & videos not included
Magazin ("Magazine")	1987	648.000	export & videos not included
Besane noći ("Sleepless Nights)	1988	487.000	
Dobro jutro ("Good Morning")	1989	721.000	export & videos not included
Najbolje godine ("The Best Years")	1991	492.000	export & videos not included
Najbolje godine ("The Best Years")	1993	unknown	
Let ("Flight")	1996	unknown	
Svi najveći hitovi 1983 – 1990 ("The Biggest Hits")	1998	unknown	
Magazin-Svi najveći hitovi 1983 – 1990 ("Magazin – The Biggest Hits")	2003	unknown	
Balade 1982 – 1990 ("The Best of Ballads")	2008	unknown	
