= Mssv =

American experimental rock band

mssv
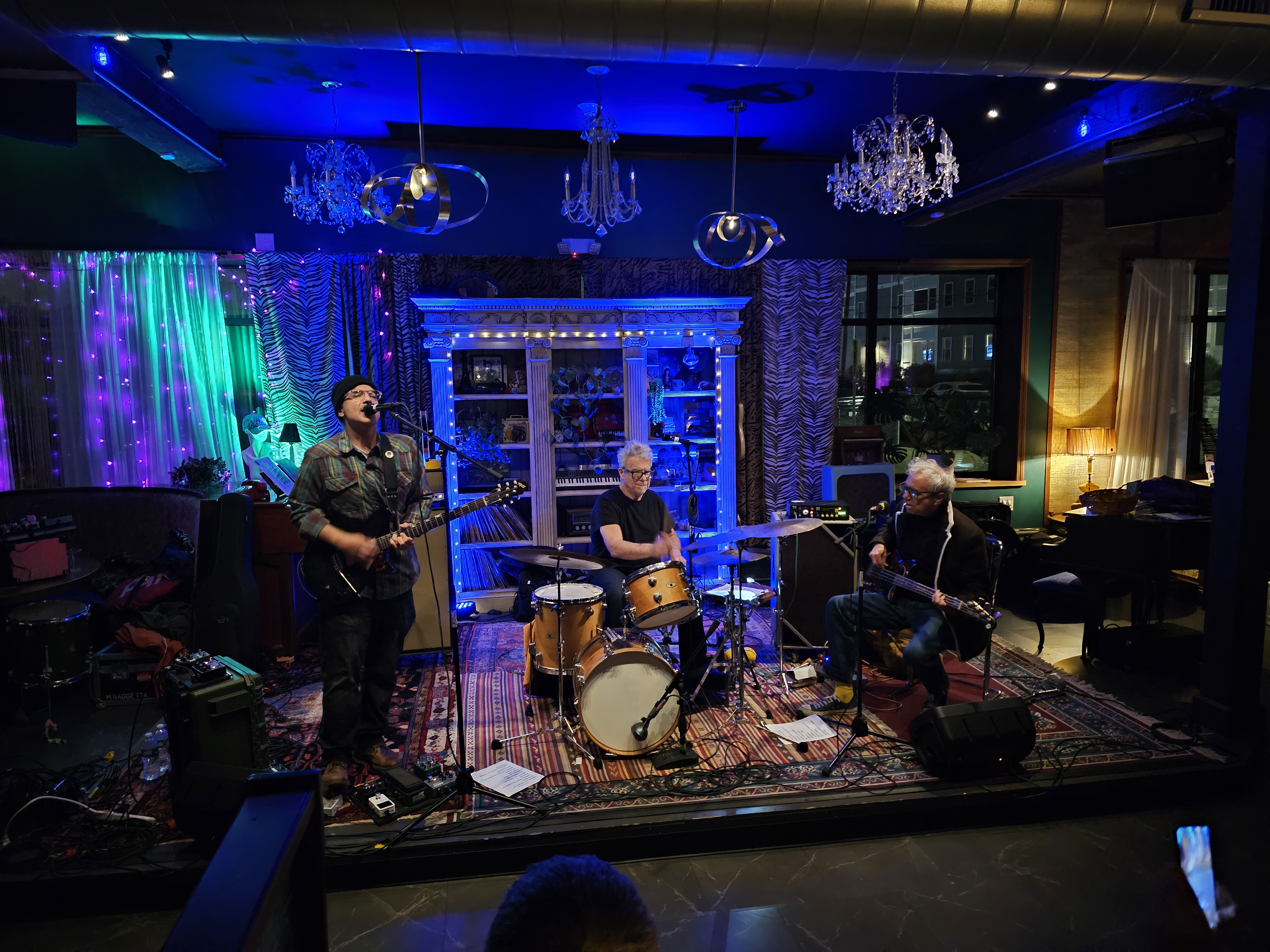
- Playing live in Myrtle, East Providence, RI

Background information
- Origin: United States
- Genres: Experimental Rock
- Years active: 2019-present
- Labels: Stripped Light Records, BIG EGO
- Members: Mike Baggetta; Mike Watt; Stephen Hodges
- Website: https://mainsteamstopvalve.com

mssv (Main Steam Stop Valve) is an American band featuring Mike Baggetta, Mike Watt and Stephen Hodges.

== History ==
Baggetta and Watt recorded Wall of Flowers with drummer Jim Keltner but after releasing it Keltner was averse to travel so Stephen Hodges was brought in to tour the album; Hodges had previously worked with Watt on the latter's second solo album, Contemplating The Engine Room. The resulting trio named themselves mssv and recorded a live album entitled Live Flowers. The album, recorded live at Johnny Brenda's in Philadelphia on March 28, 2019 consists largely of songs from Wall of Flowers with "Pink Room" from Twin Peaks: Fire Walk with Me, "No One Says Old Man (To The Old Man)" and "Liberty Calls!" from Watt's Contemplating the Engine Room and a cover of "Fun House" by The Stooges.

In February 2020, the band announced their intention to play the 2020 Big Ears Festival. The festival was later cancelled due to the COVID-19 pandemic. Soon after, mssv announced the postponement of their entire spring 2020 tour. In the same message the band revealed the September 2020 release of their first studio album on BIG EGO Records. The album would be released with the title Main Steam Stop Valve.

== Discography ==
- Live Flowers (2019)
- Main Steam Stop Valve (2020)
- Media Kittens / When the Hoarding Has Ended (2020)
- The Scott Aicher (2021)
- Human Reaction (2023)
- On and On (2025)
