= "Ring Spiel" Tour '95 =

Live album by Mike Watt
- Released: November 11, 2016
- Recorded: May 6, 1995
- Genre: Alternative rock
- Length: 57:00
- Label: Columbia/Legacy
- Producer: Mike Watt

"Ring Spiel" Tour '95 is a live album by American musician Mike Watt, documenting his first solo tour after being a member of Minutemen and fIREHOSE in the 1980s and early '90s. Ring Spiel was recorded in 1995 and released in 2016. The album material is from the tour to accompany Watt's first solo album, Ball-Hog or Tugboat?.

== Tour ==
The Ball-Hog or Tugboat? album had 48 contributors, with a different musician lineup on each song, so Watt never thought he could tour the album. Dave Grohl called with an idea for how to create a small touring band with Eddie Vedder's band Hovercraft and Dave Grohl's newly formed Foo Fighters opening for Watt.

Watt's touring band consisted of Grohl on guitar and drums, Vedder and Pat Smear on guitars, and William Goldsmith on drums, alongside Watt on bass guitar and vocals. Grohl wanted to play more guitar so he only played drums on eight songs with Goldsmith handling the rest. Wanting to keep the tour low-profile, promoters of the tour were instructed to not use Grohl or Vedder's names to promote the tour but word leaked and MTV showed up at one tour stop.

== Album release ==
When Columbia/Legacy approached Watt about releasing the album he was initially hesitant and suggested the label contact the other musicians to see how they felt about the idea. Watt was afraid some of the others would be embarrassed to have an album from twenty years earlier released. "It turns out they weren't embarrassed. They wanted it out." Pat Smear urged Watt to release the album as well.

== Track listing ==
All tracks composed by Mike Watt; except where indicated

1. Walking the Cow (Daniel Johnston cover)
2. Big Train (Chip + Tony Kinman cover)
3. Formal Introduction
4. Against the '70s
5. Drove Up from Pedro
6. Habit
7. Makin' the Freeway
8. Chinese Firedrill
9. Piss-Bottle Man
10. Forever ... One Reporter's Opinion
11. E-Ticket Ride
12. Political Song for Michael Jackson to Sing
13. Coincidence is Either Hit or Miss
14. The Red and the Black (Blue Öyster Cult cover)
15. Secret Garden (Madonna cover)
16. Powerful Hankerin'

== Reception ==
SLUG magazine praised the album calling it an "astonishing sonic time capsule." Pitchfork said "At their best, live albums capture not just a concert performance, but also document the energy and the context around the music. "ring spiel" tour '95 manages to accomplish all of the above; it's a nice time capsule if you were there, and it's a great document to have if you weren't, commemorating early years of musicians who are now canonic."

== Personnel ==
- Mike Watt: vocals, bass
- Eddie Vedder: guitar, vocals
- Dave Grohl: drums, guitar
- William Goldsmith: drums
- Pat Smear: guitar, vocals
