= Wall of Flowers =

Studio album by Mike Baggetta
- Released: March 2019
- Recorded: May 31 – June 1, 2017
- Studio: BIG EGO, Long Beach, CA
- Genre: Jazz fusion; free jazz
- Length: 40:15
- Label: BIG EGO RECORDS
- Producer: Chris Schlarb

Wall of Flowers is an album by Mike Baggetta featuring Mike Watt and Jim Keltner. The album has been described as "post-genre-improv-jazz-rock".

The album was largely improvised even though the trio of musicians had never played with each other before recording in 2017. A conversation with Chris Schlarb of Big Ego Studios led to a discussion about the David Torn album Cloud About Mercury which Baggetta admired. Baggetta learned that the artists on the album had not worked together previously and were simply "cold-called" by Torn so he jokingly suggested Schlarb call Watt and Keltner to join him for an album. Schlarb made some calls and soon Baggetta was joined by Watt and Keltner to record his Wall of Flowers.

Following the release of the album, Baggetta and Watt embarked on a ten-date March tour with Stephen Hodges substituting for Keltner. The tour resulted in the formation of mssv, a live album (Live Flowers) and a studio album scheduled for 2020 release.

== Personnel ==
- Mike Baggetta - acoustic and electric guitars, live processing
- Jim Keltner - drums and percussion
- Mike Watt - electric bass guitar

Production

- Engineered by Arin Mueller
- Mixed by Chris Schlarb and Devin O'Brien
- Mastered by David Torn
