= Tom Watson (musician) =

American musician (born 1962)

- Born: 1962 (age 63–64); New York City, New York, U.S.
- Genres: Post-punk, alternative rock, art rock
- Occupation: Guitarist
- Instrument: Guitar
- Labels: New Alliance, SST, Clenchedwrench

Tom Watson (born 1962) is an American musician known for playing guitar with Slovenly, Red Krayola, and Mike Watt + The Missingmen

== Career ==
Born in 1962 in New York City, Watson's father was an illustrator and his mother was a theater actor. After first grade, Watson's family moved to Manhattan Beach, California. While attending Mira Costa High School, he met Steve Anderson, Scott Ziegler, and drummer Bruce Losson who were in a band called the Convalescents. When the bass player left, Watson joined and the band name was changed to Toxic Shock.

The band played their first gig as Toxic Shock with Minutemen and Saccharine Trust which led to an invitation from the Urinals to contribute a track to the Keats Rides A Harley compilation album by Happy Squid Records. After they all graduated, they formed Slovenly and continued to gig with Minutemen which led to releasing their first albums on Mike Watt's New Alliance Records label. After Slovenly broke up in 1992, Watson joined Red Krayola.

Since then, Watson has joined Watt as one of The Missingmen and he occasionally performs with Watt as The Jom and Terry Show which consists of Watson from The Missingmen and Jerry Trebotic from Mike Watt and the Secondmen. As a member of The Missingmen, Watson performed on Lou Barlow's Sentridoh III album.

In 2000, Watson performed with Vinny Golia, Mark Trayle, and drummer Vince Meghrouni at Society for the Activation of Social Space through Art and Sound.

With The Chance Band, Watson provided musical accompaniment to Jean Baudrillard's poetry for the album Suicide Moi.

Watson joined Emil Amos and Steve Shelley as "Tom Watson and His Clients" to perform at the Swiss Institute Contemporary Art New York in April 2017.

Watson has played with Scarcity Of Tanks on the albums Ringleader Lies, and Dissing The Reduction.

== Discography ==
with Red Krayola

- Hazel (1996)
- Fingerpainting (1999)
- Japan in Paris in L.A. (2004)
- Introduction (2006)

with Slovenly

- Even So (1984, EP)
- After the Original Style (1984)
- Thinking of Empire (1986)
- Riposte (1987)
- We Shoot for the Moon (1989)
- Highway to Hanno's (1992)

with Mike Watt + The Missingmen

- Hyphenated-man (2010)

Solo

- Country & Watson
