= Floored by Four (album) =

Studio album by Floored by Four
- Released: September 28, 2010
- Recorded: August 2009
- Genre: Experimental music
- Length: 42:54
- Label: Chimera Music

Floored by Four is the debut album by experimental music band Floored by Four. The band consists of Mike Watt (Minutemen, fIREHOSE, The Stooges) on bass and vocals, Nels Cline (Wilco) on guitar, Yuka Honda (Cibo Matto) on keyboard, bass, and glockenspiel, and Dougie Bowne on drums.

The album is divided into four tracks with each titled after a band member. All four were written by Watt.

== Track listing ==
1. Nels (Watt)
2. Miss Yuka (Watt)
3. Watt (Watt)
4. Dougie (Watt)

== Reception ==
Professional ratings
Review scores
Source	Rating
Pitchfork	4.6/10

The Wall Street Journal called the album "New York avant-garde music down to its raw, improvisational core." Catherine Lewis of The Washington Post credited Watt's leadership for saving the album "from being a scatterbrained, last-minute affair" and found the track "Yuka" to be the standout of the album. John Payne of The Los Angeles Times called their work "risk-taking, spontaneous and thought-provoking electric music".

Tal Rosenberg of Pitchfork was less impressed with the album saying "it sounds like directionless and purposeless noodling."
