= Todd Congelliere =

American musician

- Genre: Punk rock
- Occupation: Musician
- Instruments: Guitar, vocals
- Label: Recess Records

Todd Congelliere is an American musician and label owner.

Congelliere's many projects include F.Y.P, Toys That Kill, Underground Railroad to Candyland, and Jumpstarted Plowhards with Mike Watt of Minutemen.

Congelliere started the label Recess Records as a way to promote F.Y.P but soon it became an actual label releasing work by artists such as Screeching Weasel, The Dwarves, and Against Me!. Before devoting himself to music, Congelliere was a vert skateboarder and it was at skateboard competitions that he first started selling cassettes of F.Y.P. With Isaac Thotz, Congelliere owns Recess Ops record distribution company and the two have opened a music venue in San Pedro, California called "Sardine".
