= Floored by Four =

American rock band

- Origin: New York City
- Genre: Rock
- Years active: 2010
- Label: Chimera
- Members: Mike Watt; Nels Cline; Yuka Honda; Dougie Bowne

Floored by Four was an American rock band from New York City. The group consisted of bassist and singer Mike Watt, guitarist Nels Cline, keyboardist Yuka Honda and drummer Dougie Bowne. They were inspired by Sun Ra, Miles Davis, Captain Beefheart and Sonic Youth among others. Their eponymous debut album was released in September 2010 on Chimera Records.

== Discography ==
- Floored by Four (2010)
