= Zig Zags =

American heavy metal/punk rock trio

- Origin: United States
- Genres: Heavy metal, punk rock
- Years active: 2010–present
- Labels: In the Red Records; Famous Class; RidingEasy Records
- Members: Jed Maheu; Jeff Murray; Sean Hoffman
- Past members: Bobby Martin; Patrick McCarthy; Dane Arnold

Zig Zags is a L.A. based heavy metal/punk rock trio. The band consists of singer/guitarist Jed Maheu, drummer Jeff Murray and bassist Sean Hoffman. Clash has described their music as a "Venn diagram connecting Black Sabbath, Black Flag and Motörhead".

== History ==
Singer Jed Maheu and drummer Bobby Martin began writing music together in 2010. The band is not named for the rolling paper company but is instead named for a slang term for cheap canvas shoes which Maheu and Martin were both wearing at the time. Both Maheu and Martin were originally guitarists but Martin quickly moved to drums and the band played a few shows as a duo.

Patrick McCarthy, a local fan, soon joined as bassist. The band's first release was a 7 inch entitled Monster Wizard on Tubesteak Tuesday. Four other singles soon followed and in 2012 the band recorded a cover of Betty Davis' "If I'm in Luck I Might Get Picked Up" with Iggy Pop.

Their first album, simply entitled Zig Zags, was recorded and mixed by Ty Segall with a debut single of "Brainded Warrior" released in June 2014.

By 2016, both Martin and McCarthy were replaced by drummer Dane Arnold and bassist Caleb Miller. When Miller left the band asked their longtime recording engineer, Sean Hoffman, to step in.

In 2019, the band released their fourth album and first release on RidingEasy Records, They’ll Never Take Us Alive. The debut single, "Punk Fucking Metal", was released in February 2019.

In 2024, the band released "Strange Masters," an album of re-recorded songs.

In 2025, the band released their fifth full-length album, "Deadbeat at Dawn."

== Discography ==
- 10 - 12 (compilation of singles and unreleased songs, 2013, Burger Records, later self-released)
- Zig Zags (2014, In the Red Records)
- Slime EP (2015, Famous Class)
- Zig Zags Live on KXLU 88.9 (live album, 2015, Nomad Eel Records)
- Running Out of Red (2016, In the Red Records)
- They’ll Never Take Us Alive (2019, RidingEasy Records)
- 10-12-18 rarities, b-sides, and more... (compilation, 2019, Nomad Eel Records)
- L.A. to Pedro EP split with Mike Watt and the Secondmen (2020, Nomad Eel Records)
- Strange Masters (2024, RidingEasy Records)
- Deadbeat at Dawn (2025, RidingEasy Records)
