= Scarcity of Tanks =

Experimental rock band

Scarcity Of Tanks
- Origin: Cleveland, Ohio
- Genres: art rock; noise rock; experimental rock
- Years active: 2004–present
- Labels: Textile; Total Life Society
- Members: Matthew Wascovich; Tom Watson; Raul Morales; Jonny Bell
- Past members: Weasel Walter; Scott Pickering; Mike Watt; Doug Gillard; Andrew Klimeyk; Jeff Deasy; Theodore Wiggs; Null Flynn The Younger; Brent Gemmill; Tom Herman; Don Godwin
- Website: scarcityoftanks.blogspot.com

Scarcity Of Tanks is an experimental rock band.

Founded in 2004, in Cleveland, Ohio Matthew Wascovich is the only member to be in every iteration of the band which has long had a revolving lineup.

Author Jonathan Lethem penned the liner notes for their 2018 album Hinge.

== Discography ==
- No Endowments (Textile, 2003)
- Bleed Now (Total Life Society, 2010)
- Sensational Grade (Total Life Society, 2011)
- Vulgar Defender (Total Life Society, 2012)
- Fear Is Not Conscience (Total Life Society, 2012)
- Ringleader Lies (Total Life Society, 2016)
- Garford Mute (Total Life Society, 2017)
- Hinge (Total Life Society, 2018)
- Dissing the Reduction (Total Life Society, 2019)
