= Mike Baggetta =

American guitarist and songwriter

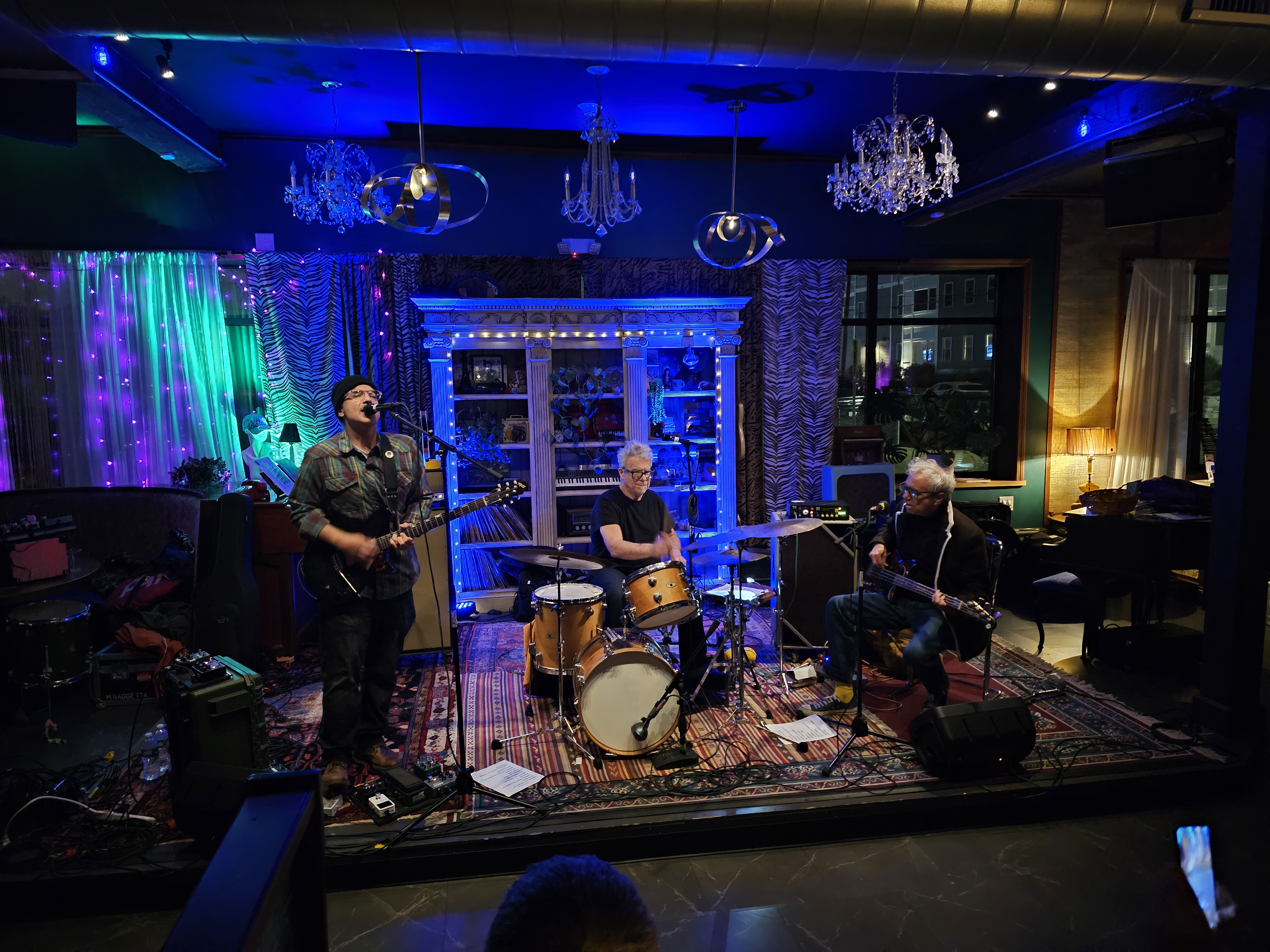
- Bagetta (left) performing in Providence in 2025

Background information
- Born: 1979 (age 46–47)
- Genres: Jazz, free jazz rock, experimental
- Occupation: Musician
- Instrument: Guitar
- Years active: 2003–present
- Labels: Big Ego, Fresh Sound
- Website: mikebaggetta.com

Mike Baggetta (born 1979) is an American guitarist and songwriter.

== Early life ==
Baggetta was raised in Agawam, Massachusetts. He took up guitar at an early age and was inspired to explore Charles Mingus by Jeff Beck's cover of "Goodbye Pork Pie Hat" on his album Wired. This led to albums by Miles Davis and John Coltrane which expanded Baggetta's sense of musical adventure.

Baggetta attended Rutgers University where he received his Bachelor of Music degree and Master of Music degree in Jazz Studies. After graduation, he moved to New York City and embarked on a music career. After fifteen years in NYC, Baggetta relocated to Knoxville, Tennessee.

== Career ==
Baggetta was a finalist in the Fish Middleton Jazz Scholarship competition at the East Coast Jazz Festival and was one of seven international guitarists to compete in the Gibson Jazz Guitar Competition at the Montreux Jazz Festival.

In Knoxville, Baggetta began performing completely instrumental improvisational interpretations of Patsy Cline songs. He also performed the music of Ornette Coleman.

Baggetta has performed with Jerome Harris, David Torn, Darcy James Argue, Satoshi Takeishi, Donny McCaslin, Dominique Eade, and Nels Cline.

As a young guitarist, Baggetta has played along with records by Minutemen bassist Mike Watt as well as records featuring drummer Jim Keltner. A conversation with Chris Schlarb of Big Ego Studios led to a discussion about the David Torn album Cloud About Mercury which Baggetta admired. Baggetta learned that the artists on the album hadn't worked together previously and were simply cold-called by Torn so he jokingly suggested Schlarb call Watt and Keltner to join him for an album. Schlarb made some calls and soon enough Baggetta was joined by Watt and Keltner to record his Wall of Flowers album which was released in March 2019. Following the release of the album, Baggetta and Watt embarked on a ten date March tour with Stephen Hodges substituting for Keltner. Baggetta, Watt and Hodges call themselves mssv and their debut live album, Live Flowers, was released December 1, 2019. The band's their first studio album was released in 2020 with the title Main Steam Stop Valve.

Baggetta and Watt are launching a new tour as MSSV in March of 2025 in support of their latest album.

== Discography ==
=== Solo ===
- There, Just as You Look for It with Kris Tiner (pfMentum, 2005)
- And Begin Again with Kris Tiner (Evander, 2007)
- Small Spaces (Fresh Sound, 2008)
- Canto (Mabnotes Music, 2010)
- Source Material (Fresh Sound, 2010)
- Bridges with Kris Tiner(Mabnotes Music, 2011)
- Thieves and Secrets (Fresh Sound, 2013)
- Spectre (2016)
- Wall of Flowers (Big Ego, 2019)

=== With mssv ===
- Live Flowers (2019)
- Main Steam Stop Valve (2020)
