= Bituše =

- Village
- Битуше
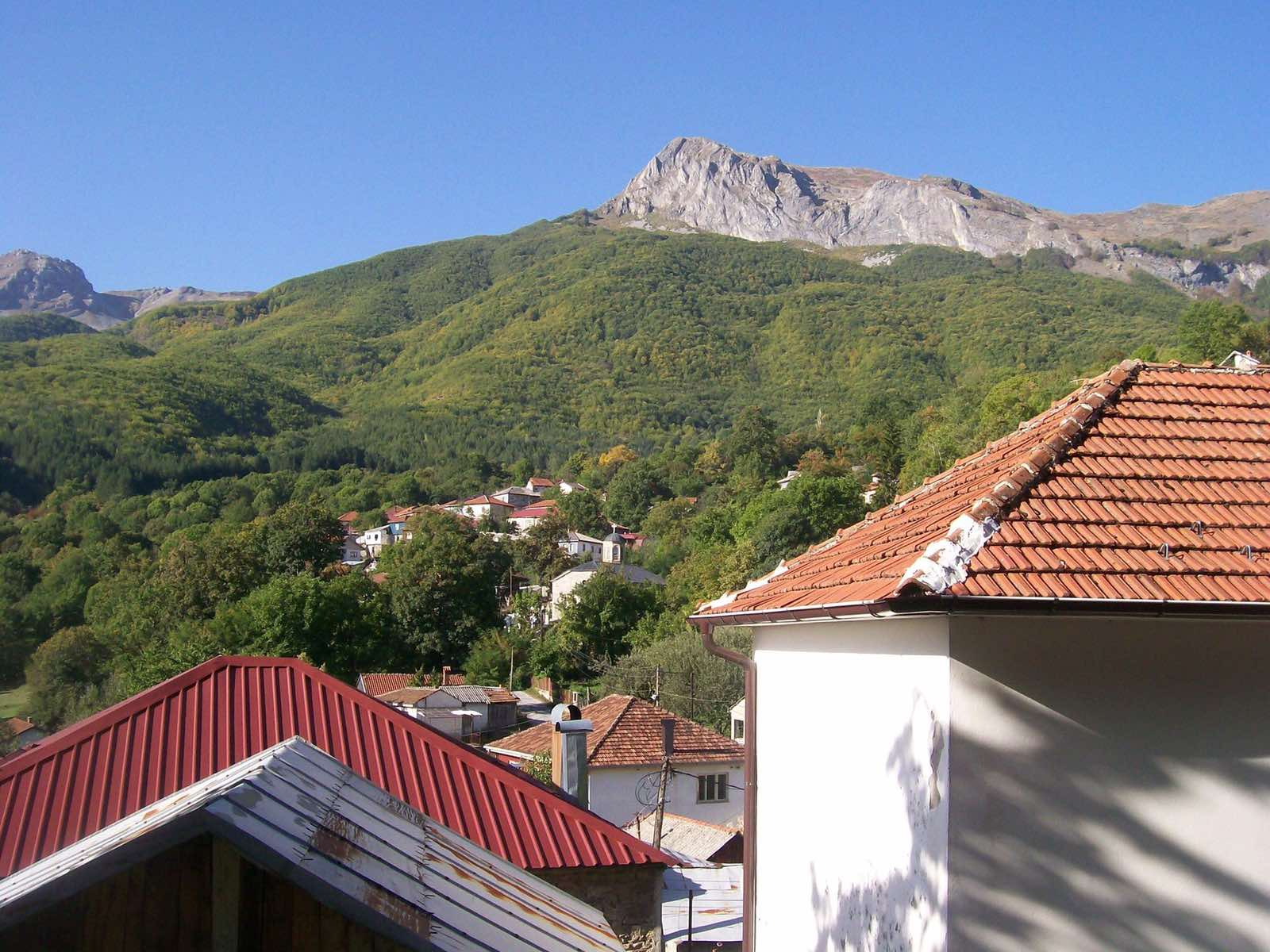
- Panoramic view of the village

- Location within North Macedonia
- Coordinates: 41.6167°N 20.5883°E
- Country: North Macedonia
- Region: Polog
- Municipality: Mavrovo and Rostuša

Population (2021)
  - Total: 161
- Time zone: UTC+1 (CET)
  - Summer (DST): UTC+2 (CEST)
- Car plates: GV
- Website: .

Bituše (Macedonian: Битуше) is a village in the municipality of Mavrovo and Rostuša, North Macedonia.

== Demographics ==
According to the 2002 census, the village had a total of 96 inhabitants. Ethnic groups in the village include:

- Macedonians 95
- Serbs 1

As of the 2021 census, Bituše had 161 residents with the following ethnic composition:

- Macedonians 128
- Others (including Torbeš) 29
- Others 3
- Persons for whom data are taken from administrative sources 1
