= The Secondman's Middle Stand =

Studio album by Mike Watt
- Released: August 24, 2004
- Recorded: January 16—February 16, 2004
- Genre: Alternative rock
- Length: 53:10
- Label: Columbia
- Producer: Mike Watt

Mike Watt chronology
Contemplating the Engine Room (1997)	The Secondman's Middle Stand (2004)	Hyphenated-man (2010/2011)

Professional ratings
Review scores
Source	Rating
AllMusic	4/5 stars
Pitchfork	7.5/10
Rolling Stone	(mixed)

The Secondman's Middle Stand was Mike Watt's third solo album and the first full-length recording that he had made under his own name since the release of Contemplating The Engine Room in 1997.

The storyline for the nine-track album parallel's Watt's real-life January 2000 bout with a near-fatal infection in his perineum with one of his favorite pieces of literature, Dante's The Divine Comedy. The first three tracks of the album represent the Inferno (Watt's illness up until the time the abscess burst); the second three songs represent the Purgatorio (Watt's surgery and subsequent recovery), and the final three represent the Paradiso (Watt's resuming his everyday life and career).

== Writing and recording ==
For the music of ...Middle Stand, Watt chose to do something he had been planning to do before the illness struck - work with a keyboardist instead of a guitarist, as he had done for his entire musical career. To play organ, he enlisted Pete Mazich, who he had played with locally in an infrequent side project, The Madonnabees, which was devoted to reinterpreting the songs of Madonna. For the drum seat, Watt tapped Jerry Trebotic, who had previously toured with Watt in his project band The Jom And Terry Show and played with both Watt and Mazich in The Madonnabes. Both musicians, like Watt, are natives of San Pedro, California, making the group the first all-Pedro band Watt had since the breakup of The Minutemen in 1985. Watt dubbed this new band The Secondmen. The Secondmen did three tours before ever recording a note of the album in the studio. For their first tour in the spring of 2002, the shows opened with the "Inferno" section of the piece. The following tour a year later added the first two songs of the "Purgatorio" section. A third tour later in 2003 mixed opening dates with the Red Hot Chili Peppers in between headlining club dates.

Prior to recording the album and a day before his 46th birthday, Watt had a bicycle accident which injured his left arm (fortunately, without any broken bones or other damage), forcing him to postpone the start of the recording sessions until January 16, 2004. For the first time in his career, Watt recorded in his home town of San Pedro, California at Karma Studio with veteran recording engineer Michael Rich, and recorded for the first time using a full digital audio system (Pro Tools) rather than analog tape.

Watt augmented the basic sound of the Secondmen in the studio with tympani and other percussion borrowed from Stephen Perkins (Jane's Addiction, Porno for Pyros, Banyan), backing vocals by alt-rock chanteuse Petra Haden, and an extensive array of effect pedals that Watt played his bass through in order to help convey some of the emotions and ideas behind the album.

No singles were released from the album, but a video for "Tied A Reed 'Round My Waist" was filmed in San Pedro by veteran video director Lance Bangs. In the winter of 2005, another Pedro native, director Mike Muscarella, filmed a trilogy of videos involving the original Secondmen lineup (Trebotic had to forego touring with the band because of family-related constraints, replaced on the road by Raul Morales) plus Ms. Haden, for the songs "Burstedman", "Beltsandedman", and "Pelicanman". All three of the videos in this trilogy, plus the video for "Tied A Reed 'Round My Waist", can be streamed at Mr. Muscarella's site, http://www.mikestheater.com. A 2005 European release of the CD includes a DVD with the videos for "Tied A Reed..." and "Beltsandedman". The cover is reminiscent of John Coltrane's album Interstellar Space, of which Watt is a fan.

== Track listing ==
All songs written by Mike Watt

1. "Boilin' Blazes" – 5:31
2. "Puked to High Heaven" – 3:15
3. "Burstedman" – 5:55
4. "Tied a Reed 'Round My Waist" – 6:00
5. "Pissbags and Tubing" – 6:17
6. "Beltsandedman" – 6:40
7. "The Angels Gate" – 6:32
8. "Pluckin', Pedalin' and Paddlin'" – 7:02
9. "Pelicanman" – 5:58

== Personnel ==
- Mike Watt - Bass, Vocals
- Pete Mazich - Hammond B3 Organ, Background Vocals
- Jerry Trebotic - Drums, Percussion
- Petra Haden - Background Vocals

== Production ==
- Arranged & Produced By Mike Watt
- Engineered By Michael Rich
- Assistants: David Coleman, Mike Helperman
- Mastered By John Golden
