= La busta gialla =

Studio album by Il Sogno del Marinaio
- Released: January 29, 2013
- Recorded: November 7, 2009 – March 23, 2010
- Genre: Experimental music
- Length: 41:01
- Label: Sargent House

Il Sogno del Marinaio chronology
La busta gialla	Canto Secondo

Professional ratings
Review scores
Source	Rating
Pitchfork	5.7/10 stars

La busta gialla is the debut album by experimental music band Il Sogno del Marinaio. The album title translates to The Yellow Coat.

Mike Watt was invited by Stefano Pilla and Andrea Belfi to perform six gigs in Italy during the late fall of 2009. The invitation inspired the trio to write and record an album which they did between gigs recording it in three days. The album was released four years later in 2013.

== Track list ==
Track list and songwriting credits

1. Zoom (Andrea Belfi)
2. Partisan Song (Stefano Pilia)
3. The Tiger Princess (Pilia / Watt)
4. Funanori Jig (Mike Watt)
5. Il Guardiano del Faro (Dook / Watt)
6. Joyfuzz (Andrea Belfi)
7. Messed-Up Machine (Mike Watt)
8. Punkinhead Ahoy! (Mike Watt)
