= The Jom and Terry Show =

The Jom and Terry Show was the backup band led by American punk legend Mike Watt (formerly of The Minutemen and Firehose) for tours of the US and Canada in 2001 and 2002. The band, in addition to Watt on vocals and bass, included Tom Watson (Slovenly, Red Krayola) on guitar and vocals and Jerry Trebotic on drums.

The group's first tour (dubbed the "Time To Cat And Not Mouse" tour, since Watt had just finished touring, or "sidemousing" as he calls it, as a member of J Mascis and the Fog) in the fall of 2001 was originally scheduled to start on September 11, 2001; Watt was in the process of leaving his apartment to pick up Trebotic and Watson when one of his friends called him and told him to turn on the news; the night's opening date in San Francisco was postponed until the end of the tour, and Watt would perform each night's show on the tour wearing dark sunglasses in memory of the victims of the 9/11 attacks. Director Bill Draheim toured with "The Jom and Terry Show" while they performed their Minnesota leg. Mike Watt and the Jom & Terry Show Eyegifts from Minnesota is the documentary resulting from the footage taken. After 49 tours across the United States Watt performs his first gig in Duluth at the NorShor Theatre then his first show in Saint Paul at the Turf Club. Finally the documentary ends in Minneapolis with his 46th show in as many days at the 7th Street Entry.

At the tour's October 5, 2001 Detroit date, Watt and the Jom and Terry Show were booked in The Shelter Club, which was located in the basement below the much larger St. Andrews Hall, also a music venue, in which the thrash band Megadeth was scheduled to play at the same time. Watt recounted the bizarre juxtaposition between the two acts in his online tour diary: Watt and the Jom and Terry Show had arrived at the Shelter Club in Watt's Ford Econoline van with only their instruments, amplifiers, and Trebotic's drum kit; Megadeth had two semi-tractor trailers full of equipment and a crew of roadies loading in to the St. Andrews Hall. Watt and company's backstage contract rider was minimal (the band often took buyouts from the promoter for chow money rather than have the promoter pay for a ton of food that wouldn't get eaten); Megadeth's was huge. During Watt's set, a Megadeth representative went to the area where Watt was performing and ordered the soundman to turn them down - something which angered Trebotic as he claimed Megadeth's PA system and amplifiers were practically drowning out Watt's performance.

At the end of the tour in San Francisco, Watt finally removed his sunglasses at the start of the show's encores, to the cheers of the audience; a fan recording of the show is also in circulation.

The Jom and Terry Show reconvened in the spring of 2002 to "replace" Watt's punk organ trio The Secondmen (with whom Trebotic also plays drums) when organist Pete Mazich's day job commitments forced an early end to his tour duties; Watson simply flew over to the city where Mazich's shift was scheduled to end and took his place. At the end of the tour in Los Angeles, Watt combined both bands for a one-time performance billed as "The Second Jom and Terry Show".

The Jom and Terry Show reconvened again at the request of promoters of the All Tomorrows Parties festival in England when Watt was asked to being both The Secondmen and the Jom and Terry Show over for a March 2004 show.

Watson has joined Watt and The Secondmen's replacement drummer, Raul Morales, in a new trio, The Missingmen; they have performed select shows in the US and Europe in between Watt's commitments with Iggy Pop & The Stooges and will be the backing musicians on Watt's forthcoming fourth solo album.
