= Andrea Belfi =

Italian composer

Andrea Belfi (born 1979) is an Italian electro-acoustic musician and composer. He began playing drums at the age of 14. From 1995 to 1998 he was involved in numerous punk bands. He studied art in Milan, before becoming involved in experimental music in 2000. He’s been member of electronic outfit Medves (with Giuseppe Ielasi, Stefano Pilia, Riccardo Wanke & Renato Rinaldi), the duo Christa Pfangen with Mattia Coletti, the trio Rosolina Mar.

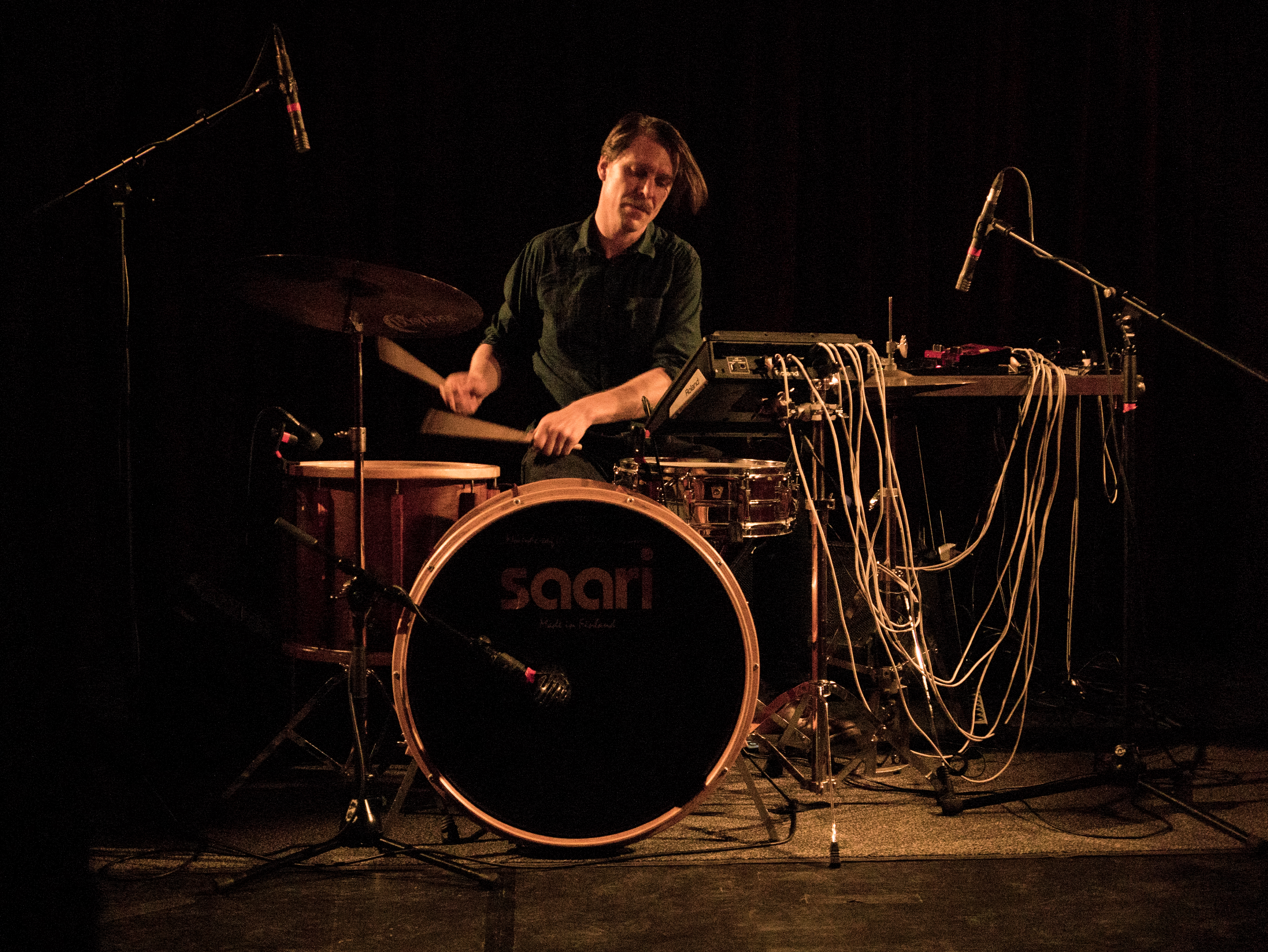

From 2002 he's collaborated with a wide range of artists like: Carla Bozulich, Mike Watt, David Grubbs, Hobocombo, Stefano Pilia, Aidan Baker, Simon James Phillips, BJ Nilsen, Ignaz Schick, Mattia Coletti, Å, Attila Faravelli, Machinefabriek, David Maranha, Giuseppe Ielasi, RCF, Riccardo Wanke, Renato Rinaldi.

In 2017 Andrea signed to London based label FLOAT and announced his new album Ore.

== Selected discography ==
=== Solo albums ===
- Ned n°2 CD (Chocolateguns 2002)
- Between Neck & Stomach CD (Häpna 2006)
- Knots CD (Die Schachtel 2008)
- Wege CD (Room 40 2012)
- Dubbing & Doubling LP ltd. (ROOM40 2012)
- Natura Morta CD (Miasmah Recordings 2014)
- Ore CD, LP (FLOAT 2017)
- Strata LP, EP (FLOAT 2019)

=== Collaborations ===
- Gilda 7" (Halley records 1997) as member of Gilda
- Before and After Dinner CD/LP (Wallace records 2005) as member of Rosolina Mar
- Watch me getting back the end CD (Die Schachtel 2007) with Mattia Coletti as member of Christa Pfangen
- Pulses and Places CD (Korm Plastic 2009) with Machinefabriek
- for tumbling CD (Die Schachtel 2010) with Attila Faravelli as member of Tumble
- Now That It's The Opposite, It's Twice Upon A Time CD (Trovarobato 2011) with Hobocombo
- Onrushing Cloud CD/LP (Blue Chopsticks 2010) with David Grubbs and Stefano Pilia
- The Myth of Persistence of Vision Revisited CD (Zarek CD 2011) with Ignaz Schick
- The Swifter LP/FLAC (Wormhole 2012) with Simon James Phillips and BJ Nilsen with The Swifter
- La Busta Gialla CD (Clenchedwrench 2013) with Mike Watt with Il Sogno del Marinaio
- Brick Mask LP+CD (Miasmah 2013) with Aidan Baker with B/B/S/
- Moondog Mask CD/LP (Trovarobato/Lineria 2013) with Hobocombo
- Mud Puddle/We come to Learn 7" (ORG Music 2014) with Mike Watt with Il Sogno del Marinaio
- Canto Secondo CD/LP (Clenchedwrench 2014) with Mike Watt with Il Sogno del Marinaio
- The Passion Of Joan Of Arc CD (Substrata 2018) with Lori Goldston and Aidan Baker

As a featured drummer for:

- David Grubbs The Plain Where the Palace Stood LP/CD/DL (Drag City 2013)
- Carla Bozulich Boy LP/CD/DL (Constellation 2014)

== Current projects ==
- Belfi/Grubbs/Pilia trio, with David Grubbs and Stefano Pilia
- B/B/S/, with Aidan Baker and Erik Skodvin
- Hobocombo, with Rocco Marchi and Francesca Baccolini
- The Swifter, with Simon James Phillips and BJ Nilsen

== Artist-in-residence program ==
- ZKM, Karlsruhe 2013
- BISAR, Künstlerhaus Bethanien, Berlin 2011
- Q-O2 werkplaats, Bruxelles 2010
- Harlem Studio, New York 2009
