= Ball-Hog or Tugboat? =

Studio album by Mike Watt
- Released: February 28, 1995
- Recorded: May 29 – September 11, 1994
- Studio: Cherokee Studios, Robert Lang Studios, Baby Monster Studios, Alpha Studios, The Clubhouse, Aire L.A. Studios
- Genre: Alternative rock
- Length: 68:35
- Label: Columbia
- Producer: Mike Watt

Mike Watt chronology
Ball-Hog or Tugboat? (1995)	Contemplating the Engine Room (1997)

Ball-Hog or Tugboat? is the 1995 debut solo album by American musician Mike Watt, previously known for his work as the bass guitarist and songwriter for the punk rock groups Minutemen and Firehose.

The title references the difference between being a team player or being a glory hog. Watt explained it as "Are you going to be the tugboat which helps boats dock in rough surf safely? Or are you going to be like some glory hound who shoots the fucking ball every time you get it?" Watt recorded the album with a rotating cast of alternative rock all-stars.

== Background ==
It was recorded in 1994, and came at a personal and professional career crossroads for Watt. Earlier in 1994, fIREHOSE had broken up after eight years and six releases, and his marriage to Kira Roessler (former Black Flag bassist) had ended in divorce, though they remained on good terms and worked as a duo in Dos; Kira also contributed some computer graphics to the album's artwork.

Without a full-time band, Watt recruited a wide variety of friends and fellow travelers to participate in the recording of the album. These included fellow SST Records alumni like former Black Flag vocalist Henry Rollins, members of Sonic Youth, Curt and Cris Kirkwood of the Meat Puppets, former Saccharine Trust guitarist Joe Baiza, Dinosaur Jr's J Mascis, and former SST house producer Spot. Other contributors included members of bands who had either toured with and/or been influenced by the Minutemen and Firehose, including Pearl Jam's Eddie Vedder, Nirvana's Krist Novoselic and Dave Grohl (making their first recorded appearance on a record since Kurt Cobain's death), Jane's Addiction and Porno for Pyros drummer Stephen Perkins, Red Hot Chili Peppers's Flea, Bikini Kill's Kathleen Hanna, Soul Asylum's Dave Pirner, former Germs and Nirvana guitarist Pat Smear, former Pixies singer Frank Black, former The Screamers and Twisted Roots keyboardist Paul Roessler (who was Watt's brother-in-law), The Lemonheads frontman Evan Dando, The Circle Jerks' Zander Schloss, former Screaming Trees vocalist Mark Lanegan and guitarist Gary Lee Conner, jazz/punk guitarist Nels Cline and his drummer Michael Preussner, that dog's Petra and Rachel Haden and Anna Waronker, and Mike D and Ad-Rock of the Beastie Boys. Also participating on the album were Parliament/Funkadelic organist Bernie Worrell, Carla Bozulich of the Geraldine Fibbers, Vince Meghrouni and Tony Atherton from the jazz band Bazooka and Bruce Hornsby drummer John Molo.

In interviews and on his online tour journals, Watt has nicknamed Ball-Hog... "The Wrestling Album", as he considered the various lineups we worked with on the album as "people getting into the ring" with him. Watt has also mentioned in interviews that professional wrestling is one of the few things he regularly watches on television (He once named The Magnificent Muraco as a favorite wrestler.) Watt's longtime friend, artist Raymond Pettibon (another wrestling fan), added to the wrestling theme by contributing to the artwork a panel cartoon with the caption "Sex with you is like watching scientific wrestling".

== Singles ==
"Big Train" was the first single from the album and one of only two songs Watt sang lead vocal on (the other being the closing track, "Coincidence Is Either Hit Or Miss".) The album's other singles, "Against The 70's" and "Piss-Bottle Man", featured Eddie Vedder and Evan Dando on lead vocals respectively. The initial plan was for Vedder to sing on a cover of Captain Beefheart's "Dirty Blue Gene" but at the last minute they decided to record "Against the 70s" instead. All three of the singles were airplay hits on both modern rock and college radio, with "Against The 70's" peaking at #21 on the Billboard Modern Rock Tracks chart. Videos were also shot for "Big Train" and "Piss-Bottle Man"; the former video was directed by Spike Jonze, and it originally featured models of Union Pacific locomotives. After the Union Pacific Railroad successfully sued the video's producers for the use of one of the models, details of the model were blurred out in a subsequent version of the "Big Train" video.

As part of the label's push behind the album, Columbia released the album as a limited-run double-vinyl LP, pressed on deep blue vinyl, and in a limited edition cardboard 12-inch by 6-inch sleeve that included both the standard CD insert as well as a second CD booklet that contained a "glossary of Pedro slang".

== Critical reception ==
Professional ratings
Review scores
Source	Rating
AllMusic	4/5 stars
NME	3/10
Q	1/5 stars
Rolling Stone	4/5 stars

The Indianapolis Star noted the "message-laden anthems, schizophrenic jazz-rock and an unbearable 12-minute version of George Clinton's 'Maggot Brain'."

== Tour ==
Watt assembled an all-star grouping for his initial tour for the album in early 1995, attracting a great deal of attention from the alternative music press. Watt was backed by Vedder on guitar and vocals, Smear on guitar, William Goldsmith on drums, and Dave Grohl alternating on guitar and drums. The tour also featured Vedder's band Hovercraft and the Foo Fighters on their first national tour. Watt's ensemble performed on The Jon Stewart Show during this tour. Special guests such as Carla Bozulich and Perry Farrell appeared at select shows.

A May 1995 tour date in Chicago was recorded and later released as "Ring Spiel" Tour ’95.

Later in the year Watt toured with a four-piece nicknamed The Crew Of The Flying Saucer with guitarist Nels Cline and two drummers, Michael Preussner and Vince Meghrouni, who served as an opening act for Primus on their 1995 US tour.

== Track listing ==
All tracks composed by Mike Watt; except where indicated

1. "Big Train" (Tony Kinman, Chip Kinman) – 3:21
2. "Against the 70's" – 3:28
3. "Drove Up from Pedro" – 4:32
4. "Piss-Bottle Man" – 3:16
5. "Chinese Firedrill" (Watt, Joe Carducci) – 3:25
6. "Intense Song for Madonna to Sing" – 3:05
7. "Tuff Gnarl" (Sonic Youth) – 3:10
8. "Sexual Military Dynamics" (Watt, Henry Rollins) – 2:39
9. "Max and Wells" – 3:11
10. "E-Ticket Ride" – 4:27
11. "Forever... One Reporter's Opinion" – 3:41
12. "Song for Igor" – 2:46
13. "Tell 'em Boy!" – 3:29
14. "Sidemouse Advice" – 3:31
15. "Heartbeat" – 5:34
16. "Maggot Brain" (George Clinton, Eddie Hazel) – 12:05
17. "Coincidence Is Either Hit or Miss" – 2:20

=== Track credits ===
The album liner notes list the following performers by track:

#	Track name	Personnel	Instrument
1	Big Train	Mike Watt	Bass, Singer
1	Big Train	Dave Grohl	Drums
1	Big Train	Nels Cline	Slide Guitar
1	Big Train	Eddie Vedder	Singer, guitar
1	Big Train	J Mascis	Lead Guitar
1	Big Train	Cris Kirkwood	Banjo
1	Big Train	Curt Kirkwood	Lead guitar
2	Against the 70s	Mike Watt	Bass
2	Against the 70s	Eddie Vedder	Singer, guitar
2	Against the 70s	Dave Grohl	Drums
2	Against the 70s	Gary Lee Conner	Lead Guitar
2	Against the 70s	Krist Novoselic	Farfisa Organ
2	Against the 70s	Carla Bozulich	Backing Singer
3	Drove Up from Pedro	Mike Watt	Bass
3	Drove Up from Pedro	Carla Bozulich	Singer
3	Drove Up from Pedro	Michael Preussner	Drums
3	Drove Up from Pedro	Nels Cline	Guitar
3	Drove Up from Pedro	Joe Baiza	Guitar
3	Drove Up from Pedro	Paul Roessler	Piano
3	Drove Up from Pedro	Petra Haden	Backing Singer
3	Drove Up from Pedro	Rachel Haden	Backing Singer
4	Piss-Bottle Man	Mike Watt	Bass
4	Piss-Bottle Man	Evan Dando	Singer
4	Piss-Bottle Man	Bob Lee	Drums
4	Piss-Bottle Man	Zander Schloss	Guitar
4	Piss-Bottle Man	John Strohm	Guitar
4	Piss-Bottle Man	Anna Waronker	Backing Singer
4	Piss-Bottle Man	Petra Haden	Backing Singer
4	Piss-Bottle Man	Rachel Haden	Backing Singer
5	Chinese Firedrill	Mike Watt	Bass
5	Chinese Firedrill	Frank Black	Singer
5	Chinese Firedrill	Michael Preussner	Drums
5	Chinese Firedrill	Nels Cline	Electric and nylon guitars
5	Chinese Firedrill	Keith McCaw	Acoustic Guitar
5	Chinese Firedrill	Stephen Perkins	Percussion
5	Chinese Firedrill	Joe Carducci	Lyrics
6	Intense Song for Madonna to Sing	Mike Watt	Bass
6	Intense Song for Madonna to Sing	Michael Preussner	Drums
6	Intense Song for Madonna to Sing	Nels Cline	Lead Guitar
6	Intense Song for Madonna to Sing	Joe Baiza	Guitar
6	Intense Song for Madonna to Sing	Paul Roessler	Piano
6	Intense Song for Madonna to Sing	Danny Frankel	Percussion
7	Tuff Gnarl	Mike Watt	Bass
7	Tuff Gnarl	Carla Bozulich	Singer
7	Tuff Gnarl	J. Mascis	Drums (first part)
7	Tuff Gnarl	Thurston Moore	Guitar, Lyrics
7	Tuff Gnarl	Lee Ranaldo	Guitar
7	Tuff Gnarl	Nels Cline	Guitar
7	Tuff Gnarl	Steve Shelley	Drums (second part)
7	Tuff Gnarl	Epic Soundtracks	Tambourine
7	Tuff Gnarl	Petra Haden	Backing Singer
8	Sexual Military Dynamics	Mike Watt	Bass
8	Sexual Military Dynamics	Henry Rollins	Singer, lyrics
8	Sexual Military Dynamics	Wayne Griffin	Drums
8	Sexual Military Dynamics	Butler	Guitar
9	Max and Wells	Mike Watt	Bass
9	Max and Wells	Mark Lanegan	Singer
9	Max and Wells	Brock Avery	Drums
9	Max and Wells	J. Mascis	Guitar
9	Max and Wells	Todd Rigione	Guitar
10	E-Ticket Ride	Mike Watt	Bass
10	E-Ticket Ride	Mike D	Drums, singer
10	E-Ticket Ride	Stephen Perkins	Percussion (first part)
10	E-Ticket Ride	Tony Atherton	Alto Sax
10	E-Ticket Ride	Coco Hayley Gordon Moore	Wail
10	E-Ticket Ride	Flea	Lead Bass
10	E-Ticket Ride	Vince Meghrouni	Percussion (2nd part) and backup singer
11	Forever - One Reporter's Opinion	Mike Watt	Bass
11	Forever - One Reporter's Opinion	Pat Smear	Singer
11	Forever - One Reporter's Opinion	Michael Preussner	Drums
11	Forever - One Reporter's Opinion	Nels Cline	Guitar
12	Song for Igor	Mike Watt	Bass
12	Song for Igor	Vince Meghrouni	Singer, drums, tenor sax
12	Song for Igor	Tony Atherton	Alto Sax
13	Tell 'em, Boy!	Mike Watt	Bass
13	Tell 'em, Boy!	Dave Pirner	Singer
13	Tell 'em, Boy!	John Molo	Drums
13	Tell 'em, Boy!	Todd Rigione	Guitar
14	Sidemouse Advice	Mike Watt	Bass
14	Sidemouse Advice	Carla Bozulich	Singer
14	Sidemouse Advice	Stephen Perkins	Drums
14	Sidemouse Advice	Paul Roessler	Piano
14	Sidemouse Advice	Flea	Trumpet
15	Heartbeat	Mike Watt	Bass
15	Heartbeat	Tiffany Anders	Singer
15	Heartbeat	Richie West	Drums
15	Heartbeat	Kathleen Hanna	Spiel
15	Heartbeat	Spot	Viola
16	Maggot Brain	Mike Watt	Bass
16	Maggot Brain	J Mascis	Guitar
16	Maggot Brain	Bernie Worrell	B3 Organ
17	Coincidence Is Either Hit or Miss	Mike Watt	Bass and Singer
17	Coincidence Is Either Hit or Miss	Adam Horovitz	Drums, Guitar, Hollering
17	Coincidence Is Either Hit or Miss	Ronda Rindone	Bass Clarinet
17	Coincidence Is Either Hit or Miss	Mario Caldato Jr.	Hollering
17	Coincidence Is Either Hit or Miss	Tony Maxwell	Cello
17	Coincidence Is Either Hit or Miss	Spot	Viola
