= Canto Secondo =

Studio album by Il Sogno del Marinaio
- Released: August 26, 2014
- Recorded: December 3–10, 2013
- Genre: Experimental music
- Length: 38:57
- Label: Sargent House

Il Sogno del Marinaio chronology
La busta gialla	Canto Secondo

Professional ratings
Review scores
Source	Rating
Consequence of Sound	C+
Pitchfork	6.5/10 stars

Canto Secondo is an experimental music album by the band Il Sogno del Marinaio. It is the band's second album. The album has been described as "Captain Beefheart meets The Grateful Dead meets freeform jazz" and an "effortless balance between Watt’s formidable past and his still potent future."

The album was recorded over eight days.

== Track listing ==
Track list and songwriting credits

1. "Animal from Tango" (Andrea Belfi)
2. "Alain" (Andrea Belfi)
3. "Nanos' Waltz" (Mike Watt)
4. "Skinny Cat" (Stefano Pilia)
5. "Mountain Top" (Stefano Pilia)
6. "Il Sogno del Fienile" (Mike Watt)
7. "Auslander" (Andrea Belfi)
8. "Stucazz?!!" (Mike Watt)
9. "Sailor Blues" (Stefano Pilia)
10. "Us in Their Land" (Pilia / Watt)
