= Mike Watt and the Secondmen =

American punk rock trio

Mike Watt & The Secondmen
- Also known as: Mike Watt & Masina (with Lijl Mazich); The Second-string Men (with Morales and Roessler); The Sort-Of-Secondmen (with Roessler and Trebotic)
- Origin: San Pedro, California
- Genres: Punk rock
- Years active: 2002–present
- Labels: Columbia Records
- Members: Mike Watt; Pete Mazich; Jerry Trebotic
- Past members: Raul Morales (2004-2005); Paul Roessler (alternate in 2003 & 2005); Petra Haden (studio only)

Mike Watt and the Secondmen is the punk rock trio formed by former Minutemen and Firehose bassist Mike Watt to perform and record his third solo album, The Secondman's Middle Stand. Formed in 2002 in Watt's hometown of San Pedro, California, the band first consisted of organist Pete Mazich and drummer Jerry Trebotic, both of whom had played with Watt in a side project, The Madonnabes, that was devoted to reinterpreting the works of Madonna; the three musicians had also previously recorded a song for a Doctors Without Borders benefit album under the name Mike Watt & Masina in 1998, with Mazich's wife Ljil on vocals.

The Secondmen did three tours of the United States and Canada wherein they played early versions of some of the songs that were to be on the album, along with songs from Watt's back catalog and hand-picked cover versions rearranged for organ. Mazich's day job commitments forced him to tour as much as his earned vacation time (five weeks for the spring 2002 tour; seven weeks for the spring 2003 tour) would allow. For the remainder of the 2002 tour, guitarist Tom Watson took Mazich's place, and the Secondmen finished the tour as The Jom and Terry Show; the spring 2003 tour saw former Screamers and Twisted Roots keyboardist Paul Roessler (who is also Watt's former brother-in-law) sub for Mazich during the last three weeks of the tour. By October 2003 Mazich decided to quit the day job in order to be able to concentrate on music while working as a freelance, "casual", longshoreman in between Watt tours.

In January 2004, the band recorded The Secondman's Middle Stand along with former that dog. vocalist Petra Haden in a San Pedro recording studio. The group initially intended to start promoting the album during the 2004 Lollapalooza festival, but the cancellation of the festival led to the band not touring behind the album until September of that year.

At one point, neither Trebotic nor Mazich could join Watt so they were temporarily replaced by Raul Morales and Tom Watson with the new combination named The Missingmen.

In 2005, personal commitments similar to Trebotic's forced Mazich to sit out a European tour behind Middle Stand; Paul Roessler played in his stead a second time. (Maintaining a sense of humor, Watt nicknamed the Roessler/Morales lineup "The Second-string Men".) The original lineup, however, did regroup to film a trilogy of three videos from The Secondman's Middle Stand with director Mike Muscarella.

A regrouping of the original Secondmen lineup of Watt, Mazich and Trebotic played the Festival Periferias in Huesca, Spain on October 29, 2005, and a benefit concert for the San Pedro Skateboard Association on November 5, 2005. After the success of those gigs, the Secondmen were scheduled to play two more Los Angeles-area shows, including a December 3 opening slot with reunited punk legends and longtime heroes of Watt's, the Germs. The original lineup continues to play on occasion in the Los Angeles area, and has also played as a five-piece with Watson and Morales as The Secondmissingmen; this hybrid lineup debuted on Watt's 57th birthday.
