= Pete Mazich =

American punk rock organist (born 1964)

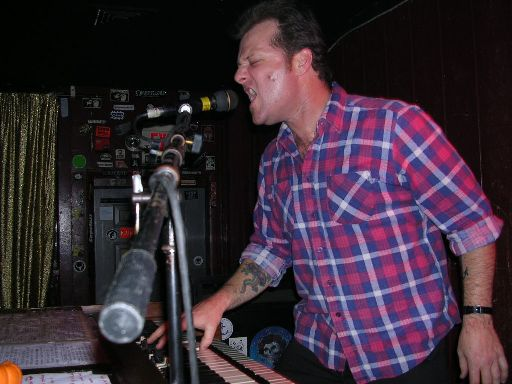
- Mazich in 2004

Background information
- Born: October 25, 1964 (age 61)
- Origin: San Pedro, California
- Genres: Punk/Alternative
- Occupation: Longshoreman (when not performing)
- Instrument: Hammond organ
- Years active: 1984–present
- Labels: Columbia Records

Peter Mazich (born October 25, 1964) is an American punk rock organist best known for his work with Mike Watt And The Secondmen. A classically trained pianist, Mazich became interested in playing the organ after hearing the classic Deep Purple album Machine Head; he also counts jazz organ pioneer Jimmy Smith as an influence.

A veteran of several San Pedro, California cover bands, Mazich first met and worked with Watt in a project band Watt was involved with, The Madonnabes, which devoted itself to reinterpreting the songs of Madonna. From there, Watt asked Mazich and another Madonnabes member, drummer Jerry Trebotic, to help record a song for a 1998 compilation album benefiting Doctors Without Borders, under the group name Mike Watt & Masina.

In 2002, Mazich was asked to join Watt as organist in a new band that would record and tour behind Watt's third solo album, The Secondman's Middle Stand. His initial tours with Watt in 2002 and 2003 would end several weeks early for him because of time constraints related to his day job at a pet food lab; by the fall of 2003 he was able to resign from the job and be able to work as a longshoreman in between Watt tours. For the first tour, Mazich used, almost unsuccessfully, a digital keyboard with a module that simulated an organ and rotating speaker. By the following tour, however, Mazich had self-customized for travel a Hammond B3 Organ which he used for subsequent touring and recording.

Mazich joined Watt in recording The Secondman's Middle Stand in January and February 2004; the album was released in October of that year. Mazich proceeded to fulfill a lifelong dream of his when he became an endorsee of Hammond Organs during the tour.

Mazich's work ethic and love for music led Mike Watt to point out almost frequently that Mazich was his "rock", adding that the name Peter happens to come from the Greek word for "rock", pietros.

Mazich continues to play with Watt & The Secondmen's original lineup for special Los Angeles-area gigs. He is also leading his own band, Johnny Angry. The group had started under the name Pipe, only to discover that another band was using that name. They then went with AMF (Angry Mother Fuckers) but changed to their present collective moniker to avoid legal conflicts with the AMF known for its bowling equipment and centers. Johnny Angry released a self-titled EP in 2006. Johnny Angry later became The Angry upon release of their first self-titled Album in October 2009 on Shab Records. The band later disbanded it May 2010 after the death of bass player Scott Cieszki in February of that same year.

Mazich has been married twice; he lives in San Pedro with his second wife, Ljiljana Nikolovska, a former pop star in her native Croatia and former Yugoslavia. He has two teenage daughters from his first marriage and a son in his present union.
