= Stephen Hodges =

American composer and percussionist

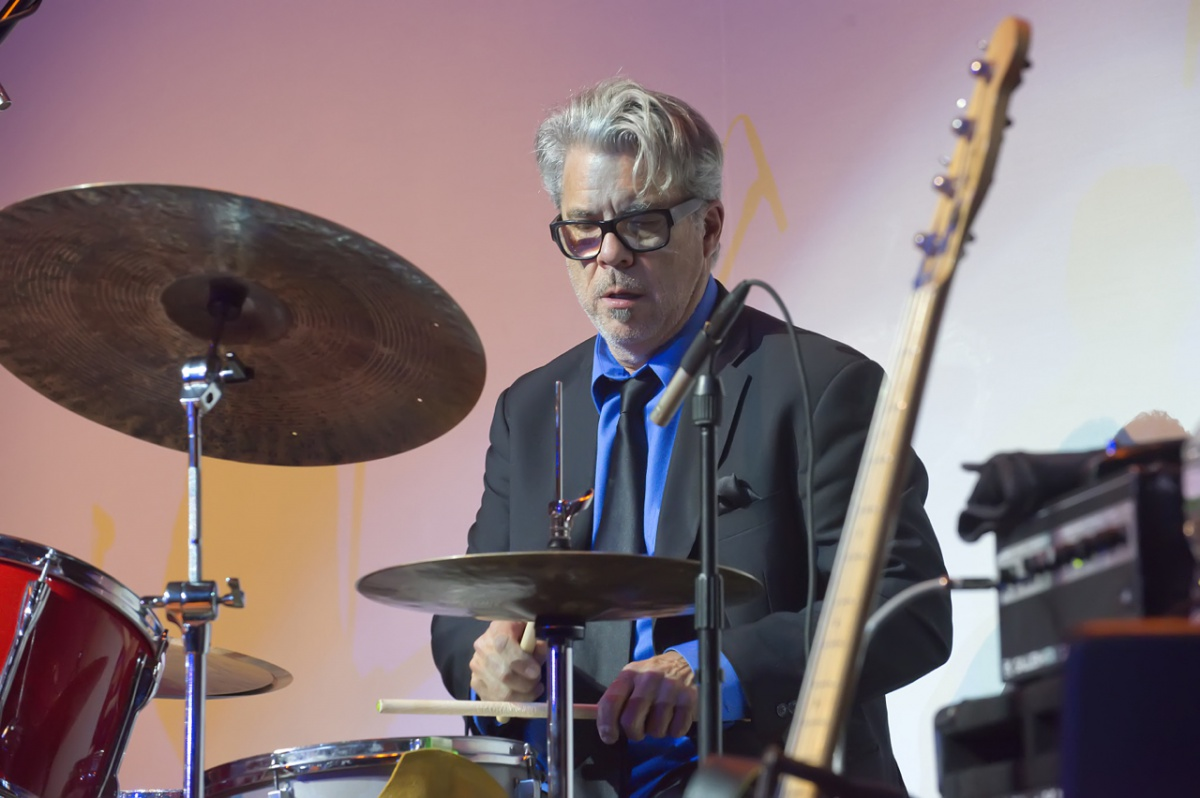
- Hodges live in 2018

Background information
- Born: Stephen Hodges; February 12, 1952 (age 74); United States
- Genres: Rock, experimental music, blues
- Occupations: Musician, actor, composer
- Instruments: Drums, percussion, vocals
- Years active: 1970s–present
- Labels: Asylum, ANTI-, Island

Stephen Hodges (born February 12, 1952) is an American percussionist and composer. He is best known for his work with Mavis Staples, Tom Waits, Mike Watt, T Bone Burnett, Rick Holmstrom, and film director David Lynch.

== Discography ==
- Tom Waits – Swordfishtrombones
- Tom Waits – Rain Dogs
- Tom Waits – Mule Variations
- Tom Waits – Beautiful Maladies: The Island Years
- Mike Watt – Contemplating the Engine Room
- Mavis Staples - Livin' on a High Note
- Jonathan Richman – Her Mystery Not of High Heels and Eye Shadow
- Until the end of the World (Soundtrack) w/ David Lynch & Angelo Badalamenti
- Twin Peaks: Fire Walk With Me (Soundtrack) w/ David Lynch
- Divine Secrets of the Ya-Ya Sisterhood (Soundtrack)
- Wanda Jackson – Heart Trouble
- John Hammond – Wicked Grin
- John Hammond – Ready for Love
- John Hammond – In Your Arms Again
- Dave Alvin – Museum of Heart
- Charlie Musselwhite – In My Time
- Charlie Musselwhite – Rough News
- Sam Phillips – Martinis and Bikinis
- Sam Phillips – Zero Zero Zero
- Lester Butler – 13
- Robert Deeble – Days Like These
- Robert Deeble – Earthside Down
- Robert Deeble – Heart Like Feathers
- Bruce Cockburn – You've Never Seen Everything
- The Fabulous Thunderbirds – Live
- Marc Ford – Marc Ford and the Neptune Blues Club
- James Harman – This Band Just Won't Behave
- James Harman – Thank You Baby
- James Harman – Those Dangerous Gentlemen
- James Harman – Live in '85 vol. 1
- James Harman – Takin' Chances
- James Harman – Extra Napkins vol. 1
- James Harman – Mo Na'Kins, Please vol. 2
- James Harman – Lonesome Moon Trance
- mssv - Live Flowers

== Film ==
Fire Walk With Me (film) actor – Directed by David Lynch – 1991

== Theater ==
Hodges was Musical Director-Composer for Patrick Murphy's 1999 production of Eugène Ionesco's Exit the King starring John C. Reilly.

== Touring musician ==
Stephen Hodges was the touring percussionist on Smashing Pumpkins 1998 tour in support of the album Adore.
