= Contemplating the Engine Room =

Studio album by Mike Watt
- Released: October 6, 1997
- Genre: Punk
- Length: 50:08
- Label: Columbia
- Producer: Mike Watt

Mike Watt chronology
Ball-Hog or Tugboat? (1995)	Contemplating the Engine Room (1997)	The Secondman's Middle Stand (2004)

Contemplating the Engine Room is a punk rock opera by Minutemen veteran Mike Watt. Released in 1997, the album is a punk rock song cycle that uses navy life as an extended metaphor for both Watt's family history and his first band, the Minutemen. The album was greeted with a positive response. The cover art features a picture of Watt's father in his Navy uniform.

== Background ==
In July 1997, Watt posted on his personal website, "I'm gonna call the band mike watt and the black gang crew in honor of engine room folk - the black gang is boat talk for engine room crew." The album features Watt as the singer, Nels Cline on guitar and drummer Stephen Hodges. It was produced by Watt and engineered by Bobby Seifert.

Watt's father joined the navy when he was 17 and retired when he was 37. He served aboard nuclear vessels, and died from cancer when he was 51. Watt was originally from Virginia, but his parents divorced during the Viet Nam War, and Watt and his mother remained in California.

Watt formed the Minutemen with his best friend, guitarist D. Boon, and drummer George Hurley, and they toured until Boon's death in a car wreck in Arizona in 1985.

== Album ==
Considered a "punk rock opera", Contemplating the Engine Room is structured in several musical groups of threes to reflect the story's trio of protagonists. Each of the 15 tracks represents part of a day in the lives of the three men in the engine room of a large naval vessel. According to Watt, the boilerman is D. Boon. The fireman is George Hurley and Watt is the machinist.

Watt was a bit intimidated to make such an overtly personal album but he felt that he had to.

I just had to get it out. I owed it to D. Boon, the Minutemen, Georgie, all the SST cats. Because it's sad what happened to the Minutemen. Fucking fucked up. But the work we did is why I get to make these records. I wanted to make a big valentine to that, to say, 'Thank you.'

The opening track, "In the Engine Room," starts just before dawn and it ends 24 hours later with "Shore Duty". It is essentially the story of a guy who has run away from a farm town, joined the Navy, and found a crew that has built a routine together. When their ship pulls into a port for shore leave, they get drunk, and the boilerman sleepwalks, falls in the water, and drowns.

The collection is a bass-driven opera which begins and ends with the same bass figure. The lyrics and music contain countless nautical references, and elements of Richard McKenna's naval novel, The Sand Pebbles as well as stories that Watt's dad would tell when he came back from being at sea. “The Bluejacket’s Manual” compares punk rock to boot camp. Watt has compared his father's experience of leaving a farm town to the Minutemen bursting open and getting away from arena rock.

Watt experimented with sounds that could not normally be achieved with a live three-piece band, at one point "rollin' marbles around on a bass drumhead and beatin' on it with our hands to get the sound of thunder." The songs are separated with nautical noises such as crashing waves, foghorns, and ship's bells. Watt also played the whole album with the top bass string detuned from E to D to push himself out of his comfort zone.

== Reception ==
Professional ratings
Review scores
Source	Rating
Entertainment Weekly	B+
Rolling Stone	4/5 stars
The Village Voice	C+

John Krewson of The A.V. Club said of Watt's punk rock opera "Against all logic, it succeeds, more or less brilliantly" Matt Diehl of Rolling Stone called it Watt's "most personal, affecting work yet." People praised it as "a meditation on the meaning of work, friendship and the quest for adventure" while admitting that it can be a challenging work, "tough sailing" at times. Mark Athitakis of Salon called it "jaw-dropping" and a "post-punk Ulysses."

Robert Christgau was less complimentary saying that what Watt isn't "is a compelling artist. He can't sing at all, can't write much, and still pretends the bass solo is a viable musical form."

== Track listing ==
All tracks composed by Mike Watt

1. "In the Engine Room"
2. "Red Bluff"
3. "The Bluejackets' Manual"
4. "Pedro Bound!"
5. "The Boilerman"
6. "Black Gang Coffee"
7. "Topsiders"
8. "No One Says Old Man"
9. "Fireman Hurley"
10. "Liberty Calls!"
11. "In the Bunk Room/Navy Wife"
12. "Crossing the Equator"
13. "Breaking the Choke Hold"
14. "Wrapped Around the Screw"
15. "Shore Duty"

== Personnel ==
- Mike Watt – vocals, bass
- Nels Cline – guitar
- Stephen Hodges – drums

== Live album ==
For the November 2017 Record Store Day, Contemplating the Engine Room was re-released on vinyl with a companion album Contemplating the Engine Room: Live in Long Beach ‘98 – Five Man Opera.
