= Jerry Trebotic =

American drummer

- Origin: United States
- Genre: Punk rock
- Occupation: Drummer
- Instrument: Drums
- Member of: The Secondmen

Jerry Trebotic is an American drummer, best known for his longtime association with veteran punk bassist/songwriter Mike Watt, with whom he has toured in the project bands The Jom and Terry Show and The Secondmen. As part of the Secondmen, he played on Watt's third solo album, 2004's The Secondman's Middle Stand.

Trebotic has been known to spend free time playing blackjack at various casinos during tours. Familial responsibilities forced Trebotic to stop touring with the Secondmen in the summer of 2004. However, he does appear in all four of the videos that were shot for the album, and he will be rejoining the band for a performance at the Festival Periferias in Huesca, Spain on October 29, 2005 and will continue to play with the band for local shows in the greater Los Angeles area.
