= Raul Morales =

American musician

Raul Morales, sometimes known as just "Rawl", has been one of San Pedro's most prolific drummers from the 1990s to present. He is currently the drummer for Killer Dreamer as well as Mike Watt of the Minutemen fame's current projects.

== Bands and Line ups ==
- The Secondmen: Mike Watt, Pete Mazich (or Paul Roessler), Raul Morales
- The Missingmen: Mike Watt, Tom Watson, Raul Morales
- Killer Dreamer: Kid Kevin, Tony, Jacob, Rawl
- F.Y.P: Todd C., Sean, Rawl
- Jag Offs: Jacob, Tony, Monica, Rawl
- The Leeches: Brian, Tony, Rawl
- Bunk: Dan, Pete, Rawl
- Drinkers Purgatory Troy, Sean, Mike, Rawl
- Able Cross Adrian, Lalo, Raul

Record labels who have released material featuring Raul Morales:

- Recess Records
- Geykido Comet Records
- Kapow Records
