= Introducing the Minutemen =

Compilation album by Minutemen
- Released: July 28, 1998
- Recorded: 1980–1985
- Genre: Alternative rock, hardcore punk, post-punk
- Length: 57:07
- Label: SST (363)
- Producer: Spot

Minutemen chronology
Post-Mersh Vol. 3 (1989)	Introducing the Minutemen (1998)	D. Boon and Friends (2003)

Professional ratings
Review scores
Source	Rating
Allmusic	link

Introducing the Minutemen is a retrospective and relatively comprehensive compilation of songs by influential punk/alternative trio the Minutemen, compiled by bassist and notable solo artist Mike Watt twelve years after the end of the band. The album is made up of tracks spanning the band's entire career, sampling tracks from all of their studio releases with the exception of the Tour-Spiel EP and the Black Flag-Minutemen collaboration Minuteflag.

The band's landmark breakthrough Double Nickels on the Dime donates the most tracks, with seven. The three-song Joy EP and the rarities collection The Politics of Time both contribute a mere two tracks.

== Track listing ==
All tracks are written by Mike Watt, except where noted.

No.	Title	Writer(s)	Original Release	Length
1.	"Definitions"		1980 ~ Paranoid Time	1:12
2.	"Joe McCarthy's Ghost"		1980 ~ Paranoid Time	0:59
3.	"Paranoid Chant"		1980 ~ Paranoid Time	1:17
4.	"Search"	George Hurley; Watt	1981 ~ The Punch Line	0:51
5.	"The Punch Line"		1981 ~ The Punch Line	0:40
6.	"Fanatics"		1981 ~ The Punch Line	0:30
7.	"Straight Jacket"	Hurley; Watt	1981 ~ The Punch Line	0:58
8.	"Bob Dylan Wrote Propaganda Songs"		1983 ~ What Makes A Man Start Fires?	1:28
9.	"Fake Contest"		1983 ~ What Makes A Man Start Fires?	1:43
10.	"The Anchor"	Hurley; Watt	1983 ~ What Makes A Man Start Fires?	2:32
11.	"Split Red"	D. Boon; Watt	1982 ~ Bean-Spill	0:53
12.	"Life as a Rehearsal"		1983 ~ What Makes A Man Start Fires?	1:35
13.	"Cut"		1983 ~ Buzz or Howl Under the Influence of Heat	2:02
14.	"Dream Told by Moto"		1983 ~ Buzz or Howl Under the Influence of Heat	1:47
15.	"I Felt Like a Gringo"		1983 ~ Buzz or Howl Under the Influence of Heat	1:57
16.	"Political Song for Michael Jackson to Sing"		1984 ~ Double Nickels on the Dime	1:30
17.	"Maybe Partying Will Help"	Boon; Watt	1984 ~ Double Nickels on the Dime	1:56
18.	"Toadies"		1984 ~ Double Nickels on the Dime	1:38
19.	"Corona"	Boon	1984 ~ Double Nickels on the Dime	2:25
20.	"History Lesson – Part II"		1984 ~ Double Nickels on the Dime	2:11
21.	"This Ain't No Picnic"	Boon	1984 ~ Double Nickels on the Dime	1:57
22.	"King of the Hill"	Boon	1985 ~ Project Mersh	3:22
23.	"Tour-Spiel"		1985 ~ Project Mersh	2:47
24.	"The Price of Paradise"	Boon	1985 ~ 3-Way Tie (For Last)	3:35
25.	"The Big Stick"	Boon	1985 ~ 3-Way Tie (For Last)	2:31
26.	"Courage"	Boon	1985 ~ 3-Way Tie (For Last)	2:32
27.	"Spoken Word Piece"		1985 ~ 3-Way Tie (For Last)	1:07
28.	"Just Another Soldier"	Boon	1985 ~ 3-Way Tie (For Last)	1:57
29.	"If Reagan Played Disco"	Boon	1982 ~ Bean-Spill	1:17
30.	"Case Closed"	Boon	1982 ~ Bean-Spill	1:28
31.	"Futurism Restated"	Boon; Watt	1982 ~ Bean-Spill	0:56
32.	"Joy"	Hurley; Watt	1981 ~ Joy	0:54
33.	"Black Sheep"	Hurley; Watt	1981 ~ Joy	1:09
34.	"Badges"		1984 ~ The Politics of Time	0:34
35.	"Party With Me Punker"		1984 ~ The Politics of Time	0:55

== Personnel ==
Minutemen

- D. Boon – guitar, vocals, production
- Mike Watt – bass, vocals, production
- George Hurley – drums

Technical

- Spot – production, engineering
- Ethan James – production, engineering
- Joe Carducci – production, engineering
