= Minutemen discography =

Rock band discography

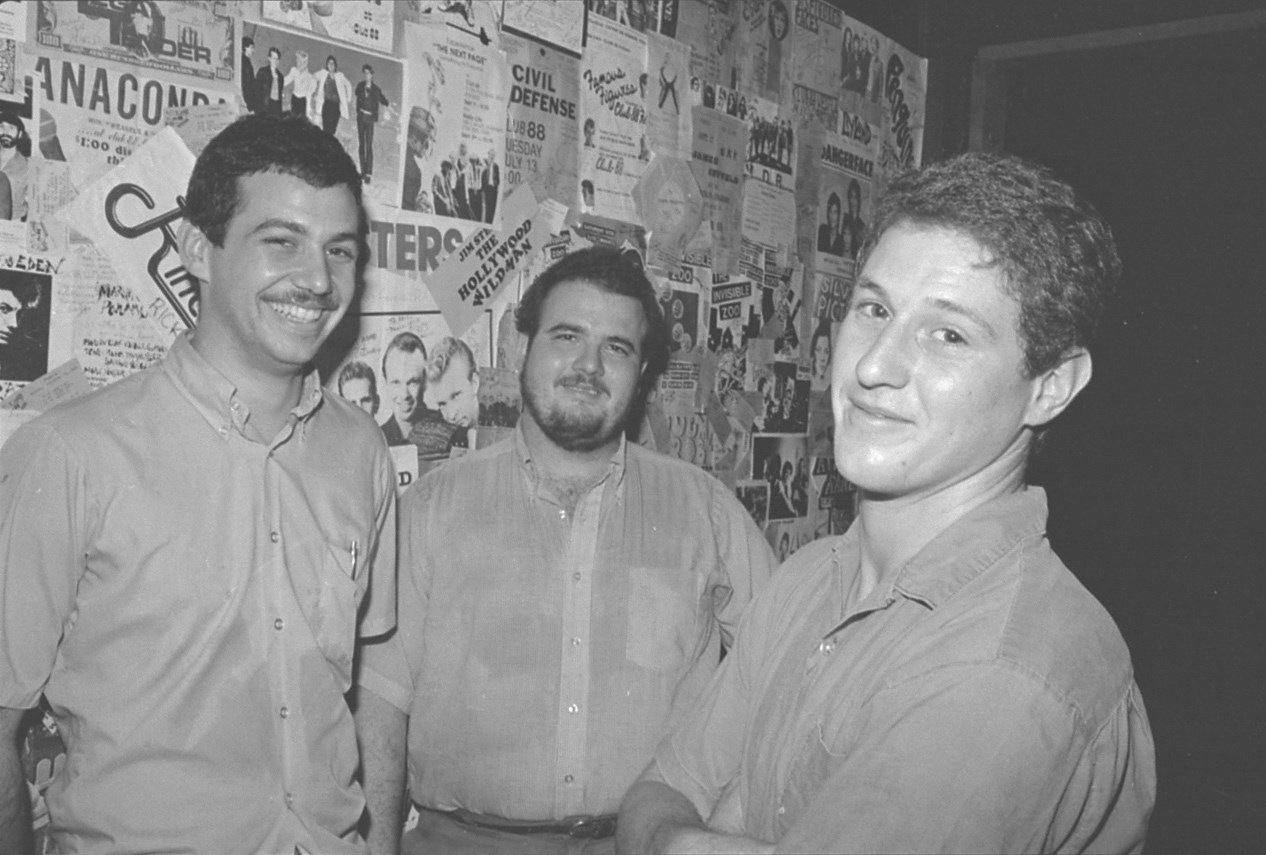
- Minutemen posing in 1982
- Studio albums: 4
- Extended plays: 8
- Live albums: 1
- Compilation albums: 7
- Music videos: 4

The discography for the Minutemen, an American punk rock band, includes four studio albums, one live album, seven compilation albums, four music videos, and eight extended plays.

Formed in 1980 by guitarist D. Boon and bassist Mike Watt, the Minutemen signed to the Californian independent record label SST Records at their second concert. Their first extended play, Paranoid Time, appeared later that year, followed by the Joy EP (on their own label, New Alliance Records) and their first studio album, The Punch Line. The Minutemen continued to release new material throughout 1982 and 1983 to a mostly local audience. In 1984, the band released Double Nickels on the Dime, their only double album and best-selling release. They continued to release more material, including the commercially oriented Project: Mersh and 3-Way Tie (For Last), until Boon's untimely death in December 1985.

Following the band's breakup, SST Records purchased New Alliance and reissued a number of recordings on compact disc and vinyl. SST also released a live album, Ballot Result, and Minuteflag, the result of an earlier collaboration with Black Flag. A three volume compilation, Post-Mersh, which combined several of the Minutemen's EPs and albums, was released between 1987 and 1989. The band's songs continued to appear in compilations, videos and soundtracks; "Corona" was the theme music of MTV's Jackass. A compilation album featuring a selection of songs from the band's career, the Watt-compiled Introducing the Minutemen, was released in 1998. We Jam Econo, a feature-length Minutemen film, appeared in theaters in February 2005.

== Studio albums ==
Year	Title
1981	The Punch Line: Debut album; Record label: SST Records (#SST 004/SST C004); Released: November 1981; Format: 12-inch vinyl, cassette
1983	What Makes a Man Start Fires?: Record label: SST Records (#SST 014); Released: January 1983; Format: 12-inch vinyl
1984	Double Nickels on the Dime: Record label: SST Records (#SST 028); Released: July 1984; Format: 12-inch vinyl (×2), cassette; Reissued on CD by SST in 1987 (#CD 028) and 1990 (#CDEX 028)
1985	3-Way Tie (For Last): Record label: SST Records (#SST 058/SST C058); Released: December 1985; Format: 12-inch vinyl, cassette

== Live albums ==
Year	Title	Recorded	Comments
1986	Ballot Result: Record label: SST Records (#SST 068); Released: 1987; Format: 12-inch vinyl (×2); Reissued by SST in 1987 on CD (#SST CD 068)	September 1980—30 November 1985	Live recordings from throughout the Minutemen's career selected from the result of a fan ballot.

== Extended plays ==
Year	Title	Comments
1980	Paranoid Time: Record label: SST Records (#SST 002); Released: December 1980; Format: 7-inch vinyl; Format: Mini CD; Reissued by SST in 1985 on 10-inch vinyl (#SST 917)	Debut release.
1981	Joy: Record label: New Alliance Records (#NAR 003); Released: August 1981; Format: 7-inch vinyl; Format: Mini CD; Reissued by SST in 1988 on compact disc (#SST CD 214)	
1982	Bean-Spill: Record label: Thermidor Records (#T 08); Released: 1982; Format: 7-inch vinyl	
1983	Buzz or Howl Under the Influence of Heat: Record label: SST Records (#SST 016); Released: November 1983; Format: 12-inch vinyl, cassette; Reissued by SST in 1991 on CD (#SST CD 016)	
1984	Tour-Spiel: Record label: Reflex Records (#Reflex L); Released: 1985; Format: 7-inch vinyl	Comprises four cover songs.
1985	Project: Mersh: Record label: SST Records (#SST 034); Released: June 1985; Format: 12-inch vinyl; Reissued by SST in March 1992 on CD (#SST CD 034)	
1986	Minuteflag: Record label: SST Records (#SST 050); Released: Early 1986; Format: 12-inch vinyl	Collaboration with the members of Black Flag.
1993	Georgeless: Record label: Forced Exposure (#FE 30); Released: 1993; Format: 7-inch vinyl	Live EP of a concert in March 1980 with Frank Tonche as drummer.
2011	Minutemen/Saccharine Trust split 7-inch: Record Label: Water Under The Bridge; Released: March 2011; Format: 7-inch vinyl	3 songs each band recorded in 80/81 that were only available on Comp Records.

== Compilations ==
Year	Title	Comments
1984	The Politics of Time: Record label: New Alliance Records (#NAR 017); Released: Early 1984; Format: 12-inch vinyl, cassette; Reissued on CD by SST Records in 1991 (#SST 227)	Features seven songs meant for a non-SST album, a number of live tracks, and a Reactionaries song.
1985	My First Bells: Record label: SST Records (#SST 032); Released: 1985; Format: cassette	
1987	Post-Mersh Vol. 1: Record label: SST Records (#SST CD 138); Released: December 1987; Format: CD	Combines The Punch Line and What Makes a Man Start Fires? on one CD.
1988	Post-Mersh Vol. 2: Record label: SST Records (#SST CD 139); Released: September 1988; Format: CD	Combines the EPs Buzz or Howl Under the Influence of Heat and Project: Mersh on one CD.
1989	Post-Mersh Vol. 3: Record label: SST Records (#SST CD 165); Released: December 1989; Format: CD	Combines four EPs (Paranoid Time, Joy, Bean-Spill, and Tour-Spiel) and The Politics of Time on one CD.
1998	Introducing the Minutemen: Record label: SST Records (#SST CD 363); Released: 28 July 1998; Format: CD	

== Compilation appearances ==
Year	Compilation	Songs	Comments
1980	Cracks in the Sidewalk	"9:30 May 2"	Later released on My First Bells. The compilation was New Alliance Records' first release.
1981	Chunks	"Clocks"	Later released on My First Bells.
1981	Rodney on the Roq: Volume 2	"Search"	From The Punch Line.
1981	Life Is Beautiful So Why Not Eat Health Foods?	"Prelude"	T. Rex cover, later released on My First Bells.
1981	American Youth Report	"Working Men are Pissed"	Later released on The Politics of Time.
1981	The Future Looks Bright Ahead	"Punch Line", "Warfare", "Straight Jacket", "Tension"	Later released on The Punch Line.
1982	Life Is Ugly So Why Not Kill Yourself?	"Shit You Hear at Parties", "Maternal Rite"	Later released on The Politics of Time.
1983	Hell Comes to Your House Part II	"Corona"	Later released on Double Nickels on the Dime.
1983	The Blasting Concept	"Paranoid Chant", "The Maze", "Boiling", "Games"	"Paranoid Chant" and "The Maze" from Paranoid Time, and "Boiling" and "Games" from The Punch Line.
1983	We Got Power	"Party with Me Punker"	Later released on The Politics of Time.
1983	The Radio Tokyo Tapes	"I Felt Like A Gringo"	From Buzz or Howl Under The Influence of Heat.
1984	Rat Music for Rat People Vol. 2 (CD Presents)	"Fake Contest (live - KCRW 11/27/82)"	Studio version from What Makes a Man Start Fires?.
1984	Mystic Sampler #1	"Party with Me Punker"	Later released on The Politics of Time.
1984	Meathouse 1	"Split Red", "Base King", "Prelude"	"Split Red" from Bean Spill, "Base King" from The Politics of Time. "Prelude" is a T. Rex cover, later released on My First Bells.
1985	The Radio Tokyo Tapes, Vol. 3	"Time"	Richard Hell cover
1986	The Blasting Concept Vol. 2	"Ain't Talkin' 'Bout Love"	Van Halen cover from Double Nickels on the Dime. Chorusless version of the song.
1986	The 7 Inch Wonders of the World	"Validation", "The Maze", "Definitions", "Sickles and Hammers", "Fascist", "Joe McCarthy's Ghost", "Paranoid Chant"	All the songs of Paranoid Time.
1987	The Best Of The Radio Tokyo Tapes	"I Felt Like A Gringo"	From Buzz or Howl Under the Influence of Heat.
1988	SST Acoustic	"Stories"	From 3-Way Tie (For Last).
1990	CMJ 10	"Political Song For Michael Jackson To Sing"	From Double Nickels on the Dime.
1990	Duck and Cover	"Ain't Talkin' 'Bout Love"	From Double Nickels on the Dime.
1994	Our Band Could Be Your Life	"Badges (live)"	A Minutemen tribute album, featuring covers of Minutemen songs by various artists. "Badges" is a live version recorded with Richard Derrick on drums.
1997	Live at WREK	"Political Nightmare"	From 3-Way Tie (For Last)
2000	Gimmie Indie Rock V.1	"Political Song For Michael Jackson To Sing"	From Double Nickels on the Dime.
2000	Under the Influence	"History Lesson - Part II", "Storm In My House"	From Double Nickels on the Dime.
2002	Modern Rock	"Courage"	From 3-Way Tie (For Last).
2003	D. Boon and Friends	"I Felt Like A Gringo", "Self-Referenced", God Bows to Math", "Themselves", "#1 Hit Song", "History Lesson - Part II"	"I Felt Like A Gringo" and "Self-Referenced" from Buzz or Howl Under The Influence of Heat, others from Double Nickels on the Dime.
2004	Party or Go Home	"Party with Me Punker"	From The Politics of Time.
2004	Left of the Dial	"Political Song For Michael Jackson To Sing"	From Double Nickels on the Dime.

== Soundtrack appearances ==
Year	Video	Songs	Comments
1989	Streets on Fire	"Paranoid Chant", "I Felt Like A Gringo"	Skateboarding video soundtracks.
1989	Savannah Slamma III	"Dream Told By Moto", "Cut", "I Felt Like A Gringo"	Skateboarding video soundtracks.
1995	5 Prime	"Little Man With A Gun In His Hand"	Skateboarding video soundtracks.
1998	Strip Mall Heroes	"Little Man With A Gun In His Hand"	Skateboarding video soundtracks.
1999	Magic	"Anxious Mofo"	Skateboarding video soundtracks.
2003	Jackass: The Movie	"Corona"	Film soundtrack. "Corona" was also the theme music in the TV series.
2004	Levelland	"Little Man With A Gun In His Hand", "Shit From An Old Notebook", "This Ain't No Picnic", "History Lesson - Part II"	Film soundtrack.
2004	Word Wars	"Do You Want New Wave (Or Do You Want the Truth)", "The Glory of Man"	

== Promotional releases ==
Year	Title	Comments
1984	Wheels of Fortune: Record label: SST Records (#PSST E28); Released: Mid 1984; Format: 12-inch vinyl	Sampler of nine songs from Double Nickels on the Dime.
1985	"Courage": Record label: SST Records (#PSST E58); Released: Early 1985; Format: 7-inch vinyl	From their then-forthcoming album 3 Way-Tie (For Last), the single features three songs, "Courage", "What Is It?" and "Stories".

== Music videos ==
Year	Title	Director	Album
1984	"Ain't Talkin' 'Bout Love"	Randall Jahnson	Double Nickels on the Dime
1984	"This Ain't No Picnic"	Randall Jahnson	Double Nickels on the Dime
1985	"King of the Hill"	Randall Jahnson	Project: Mersh
1985	"Ack Ack Ack"	John Talley-Jones	3-Way Tie (For Last)

== Videography ==
Year	VHS/DVD	Comments
1986	The Tour: Distributor: SST (United States); Released: 1986; Format: VHS (#SSTV 002)	Includes live performance by the Minutemen, Hüsker Dü, Meat Puppets, SWA, and Saccharine Trust as recorded in March 1985.
2006	We Jam Econo - The Story of the Minutemen: Distributor: Plexifilm (United States); Released: June 2006 (We Jam Econo released to theaters in February 2005); Format: DVD x2 (#PLEXI028-1)	Two disc set. Includes the feature-length film We Jam Econo, the Minutemen's music videos and previously unseen interviews and scenes on the first disc, and several live shows on the second.
2011	A History Lesson Part 1 Punk Rock in Los Angeles in 1984: Record label: Historical Records; Distributor: Music Video Distributors; Released: March 2011 (released to clubs and theaters in August 2010); Format: DVD	Live performances of 6 Minutemen songs in 1984 from the Olympic Auditorium in Los Angeles and the Cathay De Grande in Hollywood and an interview of Mike Watt. Also featured are performances and interviews of the Meat Puppets, Redd Kross, and Twisted Roots.
