= Ballot Result =

Live album by Minutemen
- Released: 1987
- Recorded: September 1980 – November 30, 1985
- Genre: Alternative rock, post-punk, hardcore punk
- Length: 69:06
- Label: SST (068)
- Producer: Mike Watt

Minutemen chronology
Minuteflag (1986)	"Ballot Result" (1987)	Post-Mersh Vol. 1 (1987)

Professional ratings
Review scores
Source	Rating
AllMusic	4/5 stars
Alternative Rock	7/10
Christgau's Record Guide: The '80s	A−
The Great Rock Discography	8/10
MusicHound Rock	3/5 stars
The Rolling Stone Album Guide	4/5 stars

"Ballot Result" is a posthumous live album by Minutemen, released in 1987 by SST Records.

== Production ==
Following 3-Way Tie (For Last), Minutemen decided to do a live album entitled, Three Dudes, Six Sides, Half Studio, Half Live. The group printed ballots which they passed out to fans during their summer and fall 1985 performances as well as inserted into the first pressing of 3-Way Tie (For Last); the ballots would determine which songs the band would record for the live portion of the album.

The death of guitarist and lead singer D. Boon on December 22, 1985, scuttled Minutemen, putting an end to both the band and the planned live album. Surviving members Mike Watt and George Hurley, a few months from reuniting to form Firehose with singer/guitarist Ed Crawford, decided to use the ballots and existing live recordings (many sent in by fans and friends) to compile the album.

The final album contains all live recordings plus a few rarities and a couple of previously released studio tracks to compensate for the fact that Minutemen had not performed the songs live yet (as in the case of "The Price of Paradise" from 3-Way Tie...) or that no live recording of the song was available ("Song for El Salvador" from The Punch Line and "Dreams are Free, Motherfucker!" from Buzz or Howl Under the Influence of Heat, to give two examples).

The CD version deletes most of the previously released studio recordings (except for "Shit You Hear at Parties" from The Politics of Time, which SST didn't have the rights to at the time) but also, curiously, deletes the live version of "Hey Lawdy Mama". The cassette version adds a cover of "Fortunate Son" that was an outtake from the Joy sessions and a "Closing Jam" (from 1983) to the double vinyl track listing – these two tracks appear at the end of side one, after "Song For El Salvador".

== Track listing ==
=== Original double album ===
Side one

1. "Little Man with a Gun in His Hand" (Chuck Dukowski, Boon) – 3:03
2. "Political Song for Michael Jackson to Sing" (Watt) – 1:25
3. "I Felt Like a Gringo" (Watt) – 1:39
4. "Jesus and Tequila" (Carducci, Boon) – 2:52
5. "Courage" (Boon) – 2:55
6. "King of the Hill" (Boon) – 3:00
7. "Bermuda" (Roky Erickson) – 3:07
  - All tracks on Side one from a live broadcast on WREK radio, Atlanta, GA, on November 30, 1985.

Side two

1. "No One" (remix) (Kira Roessler, Watt) – 6:30
  - Remix by Ethan James, Radio Tokyo Studio, November 1985.
2. "Mr. Robot's Holy Orders" (Hurley, Watt) – 7:45
  - From a live broadcast on WREK radio, Atlanta, GA, on November 30, 1985.
3. "The Price of Paradise" (Boon) – 3:31
  - Previously issued track from 3-Way Tie (For Last) (1985).
4. "Song for El Salvador" (Boon) – 0:31
  - Previously issued track from The Punch Line (1981).

Side three

1. "Ack Ack Ack" (Talley-Jones, Johansen) – 0:32
2. "History Lesson Part II" (Watt) – 2:30
3. "Hey Lawdy Mama" (Kay, Byrom, Edmonton)
4. "This Ain't No Picnic" (Boon) – 1:46
5. "The Cheerleaders" (Boon) – 3:28
6. "Time" (Richard Hell) – 2:36
  - First six tracks from a Spin Radio taping done at KPFK's studio in Los Angeles, CA in October 1985.
7. "Cut" (Watt) – 2:01
8. "Split Red" (Boon, Watt) – 1:05
  - Both tracks from a live broadcast on KPFK, January 2, 1983.
9. "Dreams Are Free, Motherfucker!" (Crane, Boon, Hurley, Watt) – 1:09
  - Previously issued track from Buzz or Howl Under the Influence of Heat (1983).

Side four

1. "Shit You Hear at Parties" (Boon, Watt) – 1:06
  - From a November 28, 1981 recording session that wasn't released until 1984 as part of the album The Politics Of Time.
2. "Hell" (Second Take) (Boon, Watt, Hurley) – 7:05
  - Recorded February 2, 1984 in the garage of Saccharine Trust's Jack Brewer with a handheld tape recorder.
3. "Tour-Spiel" (Watt) – 3:22
4. "Take Our Test" (Watt) – 2:03
  - From a soundboard cassette of a performance at Casa Armijo in Albuquerque, NM on May 25, 1985, during Black Flag's Loose Nut tour.
5. "The Punch Line" (Watt) – 0:46
6. "Search" (Hurley, Watt) – 0:48
7. "Bob Dylan Wrote Propaganda Songs" – 1:16 (Watt)
  - From an audience cassette of a performance at Love Hall in Philadelphia, Pennsylvania, on December 15, 1983, during a mini-tour of the East Coast with Hüsker Dü.
8. "Badges" (Watt) – 0:38
9. "Tension" (Tamburovich, Watt) – 1:33
  - From a cassette recording of a Minutemen band practice in the shed behind George Hurley's house sometime in September 1980.
10. "If Reagan Played Disco" (Watt) – 1:15
  - From an audience cassette of an outdoor gig at Wilson Park in Torrance, CA on May 22, 1982 (Pictures of the gig can be seen on the inside of the Double Nickels On The Dime album jacket and CD insert.)
11. "No! No! No! To Draft And War/Joe McCarthy's Ghost" (Sambia)/(Watt) – 3:00
  - From an audience cassette of the encore of a performance in Madison, WI on May 2, 1985.

=== CD version ===
1. "Little Man With A Gun In His Hand" (Chuck Dukowski, Boon) – 3:03
2. "Political Song for Michael Jackson to Sing" (Watt) – 1:25
3. "I Felt Like a Gringo" (Watt) – 1:39
4. "Jesus and Tequila" (Carducci, Boon) – 2:52
5. "Courage" (Boon) – 2:55
6. "King of the Hill" (Boon) – 3:00
7. "Bermuda" (Roky Erickson) – 3:07
8. "No One (remix)" (Kira Roessler, Watt) – 6:30
9. "Mr. Robot's Holy Orders" (Hurley, Watt) – 7:45
10. "Ack Ack Ack" (Talley-Jones, Johansen) – 0:32
11. "History Lesson Part II" (Watt) – 2:30
12. "This Ain't No Picnic" (Boon) – 1:46
13. "The Cheerleaders" (Boon) – 3:28
14. "Time" (Watt) – 2:36
15. "Cut" (Watt) – 2:01
16. "Split Red" (Boon, Watt) – 1:05
17. "Shit You Hear at Parties" (Boon, Watt) – 1:06
18. "Hell" (Second Take) (Boon, Watt, Hurley) – 7:05
19. "Tour-Spiel" (Watt) – 3:22
20. "Take Our Test" (Watt) – 2:03
21. "The Punch Line" (Watt) – 0:46
22. "Search" (Hurley, Watt) – 0:48
23. "Bob Dylan Wrote Propaganda Songs" (Watt) – 1:16
24. "Badges" (Watt) – 0:38
25. "Tension" (Tamburovich, Watt) – 1:33
26. "If Reagan Played Disco" (Watt) – 1:15
27. "No! No! No! To Draft And War/Joe McCarthy's Ghost" (Sambia)/(Watt) – 3:00

== Personnel ==
Minutemen

- D. Boon - guitar, vocals
- Mike Watt - bass, vocals
- George Hurley - drums

with:

- Crane - trumpet and backing vocals on "The Cheerleaders" and "Take Our Test"
- Kira - bass on "Tour-Spiel"

== The actual "Ballot Results" ==
According to the back cover of Ballot Result, these are the results of the ballots received by SST Records between January and April 1986:

1. "This Ain't No Picnic"
2. "If Reagan Played Disco"
3. "Jesus and Tequila"
4. "Bob Dylan Wrote Propaganda Songs"
5. "King of the Hill"
6. "Little Man With a Gun in His Hand"
7. "The Punch Line"
8. "No One"
9. "Courage"
10. "The Cheerleaders"
11. "History Lesson, Part II"
12. "Political Song for Michael Jackson to Sing"
13. "Joe McCarthy's Ghost"
14. "Shit You Hear at Parties"
15. "Paranoid Chant" (*)
16. "I Felt Like a Gringo"
17. "Search"
18. "Badges"
19. "Ack Ack Ack"
20. "Joy"
21. "Song for El Salvador"
22. "Dreams Are Free, Motherfucker!"
23. "The Price of Paradise"
24. "Cut"
25. "Take Our Test"
26. "Tour-Spiel"
27. "Party With Me, Punker" (*)
28. "Tension"
29. "Hey Lawdy Mama"
30. "Split Red"

An asterisk (*) denotes that the song was not able to be represented on the album.
