= What Makes a Man Start Fires? =

Studio album by Minutemen
- Released: January 1983
- Recorded: July 3, 1982, August 1982
- Genres: Hardcore punk; punk-funk
- Length: 26:39
- Label: SST
- Producer: Spot

Minutemen chronology
Bean-Spill (1982)	What Makes a Man Start Fires? (1983)	Buzz or Howl Under the Influence of Heat (1983)

What Makes a Man Start Fires? is the second studio album (and fifth overall release) by American punk rock band Minutemen, released in January 1983 by SST.

== Background ==
At almost twice the length of their previous album, The Punch Line, the Minutemen's songs began surpassing the two-minute mark. Breaking another Minutemen record, the band took the longest time they took to date to record What Makes a Man Start Fires?. The basic tracks were recorded in one late-night session, but then the band held two separate late-night sessions for guitar and vocal overdubs. Watt has said that he considers this to be Minutemen's "first real album."

While the songwriting credits are shared among all three Minutemen, all of the music for the album was composed exclusively by bassist Mike Watt; the bass-centered origins of the songs is especially apparent on such tracks as "Bob Dylan Wrote Propaganda Songs", "Sell or Be Sold", and "The Anchor". All three members contributed lyrics.

Also for the first time on a Minutemen record, the band had a guest musician, Saccharine Trust guitarist Joe Baiza, who added improvised guitar leads to "Beacon Sighted Through Fog" and "East Wind/Faith". Drummer George Hurley introduces his first non-drum percussion work on a Minutemen album, playing a collection of empty oil drums on "East Wind/Faith".

For what would be the only time on a Minutemen release, all of the lead vocals were sung exclusively by D. Boon, although Watt does contribute backing vocals.

== Content ==
The opening track, "Bob Dylan Wrote Propaganda Songs", is meant as a tribute to Dylan (a hero of Watt's since his childhood) as well as a tongue-in-cheek parody of Dylan's classic early lyrical style. Further showing off their sense of humor, Watt introduces "Mutiny in Jonestown" by slating the take during the basic track recording as "Pavarotti, take one".

"Split Red" is remade from the band's previous release, the 1982 EP Bean-Spill, with some different lyrics.

== Release ==
What Makes a Man Start Fires? also appears on the My First Bells cassette and the Post-Mersh Vol. 1 CD. It would be released as its own separate CD by SST in 1991.

== Reception ==
Professional ratings
Review scores
Source	Rating
AllMusic	4.5/5 stars
Alternative Rock	7/10
The Boston Phoenix	3.5/4 stars
The Encyclopedia of Popular Music	2/5 stars
The Great Rock Discography	7/10
MusicHound Rock	5/5 stars
The Rolling Stone Album Guide	5/5 stars
Spin Alternative Record Guide	9/10
The Village Voice	A−

In a 1983 Trouser Press review of the album, Charles McCardell said "the approach is fast and furious, the results dazzling." Noting, "[p]ervasive beat poetry influences," McCardell called the band "the rockin' beat poets of the 80's...[who] slash through the pretense of their bohemian antecedents." Noting that "[i]nstrumentally, the Minutemen are far superior to many of their hardcore competitors," McCardell concluded, "[t]he Minutemen's music is seldom pretty, but always challenging." Writing for The Village Voice, Robert Christgau similarly praised the band's lyricism but wrote that he "prefer[s] their music." "The more you listen", he continues, "the less fragmentary these eighteen tense little guess-you-have-to-call-them tunes sound--each transforms its own riff into an identity that meshes with the album's guess-you-have-to-call-it gestalt."

Years later, Mark Deming would also review the album positively for AllMusic, writing that "on their second (relatively) long-player [...] the three dudes from Pedro opted to slow down their tempos a bit, and something remarkable happened -- the Minutemen revealed that they were writing really great songs, with a remarkable degree of stylistic diversity." "It says a lot about the Minutemen's growth that The Punch Line sounded like a great punk album," he concludes, "but a year later What Makes a Man Start Fires? sounded like a great album -- period." In a 2022 review of the album, Huw Baines describes the album as "just a killer record by a charismatic band who know what they’re about".

In a 2015 retrospective piece on the album written for The A.V. Club, Noel Murray wrote:

What’s particularly radical about What Makes A Man Start Fires? though is the way that it documents Boon and Watt’s dawning understanding that maybe music for and about “the workers” should be something that blue-collar types might actually enjoy. It’s not that Paranoid Time and The Punch Line aren’t entertaining, but there’s very little in the Minutemen’s first two years of songs as hooky as “’99” or “Life As A Rehearsal,” or that feels as fully fleshed-out as “Sell Or Be Sold” or “Fake Contest.” The simple addition of the occasional overdub, extended break, or guitar solo was all it took to make even a minute-long Minutemen song seem “finished.”

== Track listing ==
All tracks are written by Mike Watt except where noted.

Side one
No.	Title	Writer(s)	Length
1.	"Bob Dylan Wrote Propaganda Songs"		1:27
2.	"One Chapter in the Book"		1:00
3.	"Fake Contest"		1:44
4.	"Beacon Sighted Through Fog"		1:00
5.	"Mutiny in Jonestown"	Boon, Watt	1:06
6.	"East Wind/Faith"	Hurley, Watt	2:10
7.	"Pure Joy"	Hurley, Watt	1:30
8.	"'99"	Hurley, Watt	1:00
9.	"The Anchor"	Hurley, Watt	2:30

Side two
No.	Title	Writer(s)	Length
1.	"Sell or Be Sold"	Boon, Watt	1:45
2.	"The Only Minority"	Boon, Watt	1:00
3.	"Split Red"	Boon, Watt	0:52
4.	"Colors"	Boon, Watt	2:05
5.	"Plight"	Boon, Watt	1:37
6.	"The Tin Roof"		1:08
7.	"Life as a Rehearsal"		1:35
8.	"This Road"		1:26
9.	"Polarity"		1:44
Total length:			26:39

== Personnel ==
Minutemen

- D. Boon – guitar, lead vocals
- Mike Watt – bass, backing vocals and lead vocals
- George Hurley – drums, oil drums

with:

- Joe Baiza – additional guitar on "Beacon Sighted Through Fog" and "East Wind/Faith"
