= D. Boon and Friends =

Compilation album by D. Boon
- Released: August 5, 2003
- Recorded: April 1984 – May 1985
- Genre: Alternative rock
- Length: 61:25
- Label: Box-O-Plenty
- Producers: Richard Derrick, Crane

D. Boon and Friends is a compilation album of home recordings featuring American musician D Boon, of the band Minutemen. The album is the inaugural release of the Hermosa Beach, California-based label Box-O-Plenty Records, started by Boon's one-time roommate Richard Derrick. Most of the tracks are living-room jam sessions (on guitars, bass and cheap keyboards) done by Boon, Derrick, and Crane, who had previously contributed backing vocals and trumpet parts to Minutemen's Buzz or Howl Under the Influence of Heat and Project: Mersh EP's.

Also heard on the album are live recordings of a one-time project band featuring Boon and three percussionists under the band name Hammerdown, a rare D. Boon acoustic solo show, a tape of a Minutemen gig with Derrick substituting for drummer George Hurley (who couldn't get time off work to participate in the show), and an experimental demo recording featuring D. Boon overdubbing three different lead guitar parts over a rhythm guitar track.

The cover art of D. Boon and Friends is derived from a Christmas card Boon had given Derrick in 1984.

Mike Watt, as curator of the Minutemen legacy, gave the project his blessing, as did D. Boon's father. Watt, Meat Puppets drummer Derrick Bostrom, Crane, and Richard Derrick all contributed liner notes.

In keeping with a Minutemen crediting tradition, Boon and many of the other participants are credited with "singing" instead of "vocals."

The first pressing of the CD had a purple cover. Current pressings have the front cover printed with an off-yellow background. Customers who order the CD directly from the label also receive a bonus 23-minute CD-R of other Boon/Crane/Derrick jam sessions and solo live tracks that didn't fit into the original track sequence.

== Recording details ==
- Tracks 1–16, 20–21 recorded at various living room and party jams between November 1984 and June 1985.
- Tracks 17–19 recorded live at The Music Machine, Los Angeles, California, April 5, 1984
- Tracks 22–25 recorded live at the Lhasa Club, West Hollywood, California, June 27, 1984
- Tracks 26–32 recorded live at University of California, Los Angeles, California, January 30, 1985
- Track 33 recorded at D. Boon and Richard Derrick's home, May 1985, edited and mixed October 2002.

All of the songs were recorded on compact audio cassette using a boombox's condensor microphones, except for tracks 3, 8, and 15 which were recorded on stereo open reel and track 33 which was recorded on four-track open reel.

== Track listing ==
1. "Everyone Was There" (Boon, Crane, Derrick)
2. "Fifth Gear" (Boon, Crane, Derrick)
3. "Deadline" (Boon, Crane, Derrick)
4. "The Waiting Stage" (Derrick)
5. "Indecision" (Boon, Derrick)
6. "Theme From Empty Box" (Brian Wells)
7. "The Long Road Home" (Boon, Derrick)
8. "Take You There" (Boon, Crane, Derrick)
9. "Freedom Forever" (Boon)
10. "Jam #6" (Boon, Crane, Derrick)
11. "Binky's Round"-Up (Boon, Crane, Derrick)
12. "Too Much Fun" (Boon, Crane, Derrick)
13. "All Over the Place" (Boon, Crane, Derrick)
14. "The Viking Song" (Boon, Crane, Derrick)
15. "Just Around the Corner" (Boon, Crane, Derrick)
16. "As Long As" (Parts 1 & 2) (Boon, Crane, Derrick)
17. "Hammerdown I" (Boon, Holzman, Tambourvich, Vandenberg)
18. "This Land Is Your Land" (Woody Guthrie)
19. "Hammerdown II" (Boon, Holzman, Tambourvich, Vandenberg)
20. "Our New Industrial Direction" (Boon, Crane, Derrick)
21. "That's All There Is" (Boon, Crane, Derrick)
22. "My Part" (Boon)
23. "Don't Look Now" (John Fogerty)
24. "Plight" (Boon, Watt)
25. "Corona" (Boon)
26. "But First..." (Boon, Watt, Derrick)
27. "I Felt Like a Gringo" (Watt)
28. "God Bows to Math" (Watt)
29. "Themselves" (Watt)
30. "Self-Referenced" (Watt)
31. "#1 Hit Song" (Boon, Hurley)
32. "History Lesson" – Part II (Watt)
33. "Many as One" (Boon)

== Personnel ==
- On Tracks 1–3, 8, 10–16, 20–21:
  - D. Boon – guitar, keyboard, vocals
  - Crane – bass, vocals, keyboard
  - Richard Derrick – drums, keyboard, bass, acoustic guitar
- On Tracks 4–7:
  - D. Boon – bass
  - Richard Derrick – acoustic guitar
- On Track 9:
  - D. Boon – solo guitar
- On Tracks 17–19:
  - D. Boon – guitar, vocals
  - Rob Holzman – percussion
  - Martin Tamburovich – percussion
  - Dirk Vandenberg – percussion
- On Tracks 22–25:
  - D. Boon – acoustic guitar, vocals
- On Tracks 26–32:
  - Minutemen with guest substitute drummer Richard Derrick
- On Track 33:
  - D. Boon: four multi-tracked guitar parts

=== Production ===
- Richard Derrick – editing and mixing
- Mike Watt – invaluable assistance, liner notes
- Crane – invaluable assistance, liner notes
- Derrick Bostrom – liner notes
- David Guererro – additional post-production
- Kevin Keller – additional post-production
- Paul Sanolan – additional post-production
- Joe Steiner – mastering
- D. Boon – artwork (from a 1984 Christmas card given to Richard Derrick)
- Nanette Roeland – design and layout
- Dirk Vandenberg – photography
- Special thanks: Dennes & Patricia Boon, the Derrick and Sanchez family, Mike Watt, George Hurley, Harvey Kubernik, Derrick Bostrom, Leland Jessop, Chris Benson, Tom Pachal, Stew, Juliana Roeland, Bruce Siart, Tod Van Valkenburgh, Jim Mills, and Cleo.
