= Bean-Spill =

EP by Minutemen
- Released: 1982
- Recorded: February and April 1981 (Media Art Studios); November 1981 (Casbah Studios)
- Studios: Media Art Studios (Hermosa Beach, California); Casbah Studios (Fullerton, California)
- Genre: Hardcore punk
- Length: 6:12
- Label: Thermidor
- Producers: Spot, Minutemen, Mike Patton

Minutemen chronology
The Punch Line (1981)	Bean-Spill (1982)	What Makes a Man Start Fires? (1983)

Professional ratings
Review scores
Source	Rating
AllMusic	link

Bean-Spill is the third EP and fourth release overall by American hardcore punk band Minutemen, released in 1982 by Thermidor Records.

== Background ==
The Minutemen's second LP, What Makes a Man Start Fires?, was recorded in the summer of 1982 but the release was delayed due to SST's lawsuit with Unicorn Records. To fill the lengthy gap between releases, SST Records partner Joe Carducci volunteered to release an EP on his Berkeley-based label, Thermidor Records.

Recorded in two sessions with side A recorded at Media Art in Hermosa Beach with Spot and side B recorded in November 1981 at Casbah Studio in Fullerton, CA with Mike Patton of the Orange County, California punk band Middle Class (not to be confused with the lead singer of Faith No More). The latter session also saw the recording of what became the first seven tracks of The Politics of Time.

== Release ==
The EP includes two of the band's most enduring early numbers, "Split Red" and "If Reagan Played Disco." Bean-Spill is notable for being the only Minutemen record to feature bassist Mike Watt, rather than guitarist D. Boon as the lead vocalist on most of the songs. Boon only sings on "Split Red" and "Futurism Restated".

The original pressing featured on its B-side label a red-and-orange reproduction of a Raymond Pettibon drawing of a man's naked lower torso, with the spindle-hole located on the rectal area, and the caption, "We Need The Money".

While the original EP went out of print after Carducci folded Thermidor and joined SST as a partner, the tracks can be found in their original running order the Post-Mersh Vol. 3 CD, and with the side two tracks preceding the side one tracks on the My First Bells cassette.

== Track listing ==
Side A
No.	Title	Writer(s)	Length
1.	"Afternoons"	Tamburovich, Watt	1:34
2.	"Futurism Restated"	Joe Boon, Watt	0:56

Side B
No.	Title	Writer(s)	Length
1.	"Split Red"	Boon, Watt	0:53
2.	"If Reagan Played Disco"	Watt	1:15
3.	"Case Closed"	Watt	1:28

== Personnel ==
Minutemen

- D. Boon - lead vocals, guitar
- Mike Watt - bass
- George Hurley - drums

Production

- Mike Patton - producer (Side B)
- Spot - producer (Side A)
- Raymond Pettibon - artwork on Side B
