= Our Band Could Be Your Life: A Tribute to D Boon and the Minutemen =

Compilation album by Various Artists
- Released: February 23, 1996
- Recorded: April 15, 1985 – August 1994
- Length: 73:34
- Label: Little Brother Records

Our Band Could Be Your Life: A Tribute to D Boon and the Minutemen was a tribute album for the band The Minutemen released in 1996. It contains 35 tracks of alternative bands covering songs by The Minutemen.

== Track listing ==
(All songs written by D. Boon unless otherwise noted)

1. Sparkalepsy – "King of the Hill" – 3:37
2. Seam – "This Aint No Picnic" – 2:40
3. Overpass – "Fake Contest" (Mike Watt) – 1:49
4. Hazel – "Storm In My House" (D. Boon/Henry Rollins) – 2:04
5. Nuzzle – "Futurism Restated" (Joe Boon/Mike Watt) – 0:58
6. Oswald Five-O – "Tony Gets Wasted in Pedro" (Rick Lazaroff/Mike Watt) – 1:48
7. Joe Boon & Tony Platon – "Sickles and Hammers" (D. Boon/Mike Watt) – 0:49
8. The Brain Surgeons – "Tour-Spiel" (Mike Watt) – 2:53
9. The 3M Company – "Search" (George Hurley/Mike Watt) – 0:57
10. Treepeople – "Shit From an Old Notebook" (D. Boon/Mike Watt) – 1:54
11. Vida – "'99" – 1:06
12. Ethan James & Cindy Albon – "Themselves" – 2:41
13. Tsunami – "Courage" – 2:27
14. Cellophane – "More Joy" (D. Boon/Dez Cadena/Mike Watt) – 1:15
15. Strawman – "Untitled Song for Latin America" – 2:14
16. Meat Puppets – "The Price of Paradise" – 3:19
17. Crackerbash – "The World According to Nouns" (Mike Watt) – 2:50
18. Nels Cline Trio – "Self-Referenced/West Germany" (D. Boon/Mike Watt) – 3:37
19. Dos – "Do You Want New Wave or Do You Want the Truth" (Mike Watt) – 2:01
20. Experimental Polen #68 – "Games" (D. Boon/Mike Watt) – 1:04
21. Overwhelming Colorfast – "Corona" – 3:08
22. Free Kitten – "Party With Me Punker" (Mike Watt) – 0:56
23. Jawbox – "Its Expected I'm Gone" (Mike Watt) – 2:28
24. Locos Borachos – "The Product" – 2:41
25. Thurston Moore – "Shit You Hear At Parties" (D. Boon/Mike Watt) – 1:32
26. Joe Baiza – "9:30 May 2" (Mike Watt) – 0:58
27. 67 Riot – "Case Closed" (D. Boon/Mike Watt) – 1:33
28. Kaia – "Stories" (Kira Roessler/Mike Watt) – 1:29
29. Unwound – "Plight" (D. Boon/Mike Watt) – 1:55
30. The Meices – "Political Song For Michael Jackson to Sing" (Mike Watt) – 1:32
31. Blowout – "Times" (Mike Watt) – 0:49
32. Corduroy – "Cut" (Mike Watt) – 2:06
33. Lou Barlow – "Black Sheep" (George Hurley/Mike Watt) – 1:23
34. D. Boon – "Interview" – 8:13
35. The Minutemen – "Badges" (Mike Watt) – 0:46
