= Frank Tonche =

American drummer

- Instrument: Drums

Frank Tonche was the original drummer for The Minutemen.

When the band was formed by D. Boon and Mike Watt after their first serious attempt at a band, The Reactionaries, fell apart, they had originally wanted their friend and fellow ex-Reactionaries drummer George Hurley to hold the drum seat, but he had joined a new wave band named Hey Taxi! after the Reactionaries split, so he was unavailable. Tonche, a welder by day (and according to some reports, had been in a polka band named The Polish Eagle Polka Band at one point), was recruited instead.

Tonche's tenure lasted about six months, long enough to help arrange some early Minutemen songs and play a few early performances, but Tonche quickly tired of the aggressiveness of punk audiences and quit in June 1980. By that time, Hurley was free to join the Minutemen.

In 1987, Forced Exposure released a 7-inch EP featuring rehearsal recordings of the Minutemen with Tonche on drums.

== Discography ==
=== With The Minutemen ===
- Georgeless EP (1987)
