= We Jam Econo =

- Promo poster
- Directed by: Tim Irwin
- Produced by: Rocket Fuel Films Productions; Keith Schieron
- Starring: D. Boon; George Hurley; Mike Watt
- Release date: February 25, 2005
- Running time: 91 minutes
- Language: English

We Jam Econo: The Story of the Minutemen, is a full-length documentary about the influential 1980s punk rock band Minutemen, created by director Tim Irwin and producer Keith Schieron in association with Rocket Fuel Films. The film premiered on February 25, 2005 at the historic Warner Grand Theatre in San Pedro, California, after two years in production.

== Synopsis ==
Poignant recent interviews with the band's two surviving members Mike Watt and George Hurley, as well as first-person anecdotes from notable musicians including Ian MacKaye, Flea, Henry Rollins and Thurston Moore, complement the archival concert and interview footage of the band.

== Development ==
As fans of the band, director Tim Irwin and producer Keith Schieron had discussed making a documentary about Minutemen since they were in high school, around 1989. The two approached Mike Watt who gave the project a thumbs up and that inspired them to start calling and emailing potential interviewees.

The title is a lyric from their song "The Politics of Time." It's also referred to in a comment made near the end of the film by Mike Watt, in a 1985 interview, when the band is asked if they have anything else to say. He answers for them: "We jam econo." Econo was local slang for economic and described the band's dedication to low-cost record production and touring. It also describes the band's (and burgeoning underground independent music scene's) do-it-yourself attitude and philosophy.

== Interviews ==
Film includes interviews with the following individuals (in alphabetical order):

- Milo Aukerman
- Joe Baiza
- Kevin Barrett
- Scott Becker
- Jello Biafra
- Richard Bonney
- Jack Brewer
- Dez Cadena
- Joe Carducci
- Nels Cline
- Byron Coley
- Ed Crawford
- Brother Dale
- Richard Derrick
- John Doe
- Chuck Dukowski
- Ray Farrell
- Flea
- Michael C. Ford
- Carlos Guitarlos
- Grant Hart
- Richard Hell
- Pat Hoed
- Rob Holzman
- Randall Jahnson
- Kjehl Johansen
- Curt Kirkwood
- Martin Lyon
- Ian MacKaye
- David Markey
- Mike Martt
- J Mascis
- Brother Matt
- Stephen McCllellan
- Vince Meghrouni
- Richard Meltzer
- Mike Mills
- Thurston Moore
- W.T. Morgan
- Chris Morris
- Keith Morris
- Brendan Mullen
- Colin Newman
- Greg Norton
- Raymond Pettibon
- Tony Platon
- Lee Ranaldo
- David Rees
- Lisa Roeland
- Nanette Roeland
- Kira Roessler
- Henry Rollins
- Kurt Schellenbach
- Spot
- John Talley-Jones
- Tom Watson
- Jean Watt

== DVD ==
The 2-disc DVD (with 16-page booklet) was released on June 27, 2006 on Plexifilm.

DISC 1: Feature "We Jam Econo - The Story of the Minutemen"

- Original music videos filmed by Louis 'Video Louis' Elovitz [1984] "This Ain't No Picnic", "Ack Ack Ack Ack", "King of the Hill" & "Ain't Talkin' 'Bout Love" [not used] for:
  - "This Ain't No Picnic" (directed by Randall Jahnson)
  - "Ack Ack Ack Ack" (directed by John Talley-Jones)
  - "King of the Hill" (directed by Randall Jahnson)
- 19 Deleted Scenes and Interviews
- Uncut Bard College Interview (56min)

DISC 2: Three live performances:

- The Starwood, West Hollywood, CA - November 18, 1980, songs include:
1. Swing To The Right
2. Fascist
3. Joe McCarthy's Ghost
4. Paranoid Chant
5. Tension
6. Contained
7. Fanatics
8. Art Analysis
9. Issued
10. Validation
11. Definitions
12. Warfare
13. Sickles & Hammers
14. Hollering
15. On Trial
- 9:30 Club, Washington, D.C. - 1984, songs include:
1. Big Foist
2. Retreat
3. Toadies
4. Anxious Mo-fo
5. Love Dance
6. Static
7. Search
8. Cut
9. Plight
10. Working Men Are Pissed
11. Ack Ack Ack
12. Life As A Rehearsal
13. Beacon Sighted Through Fog
14. The Only Minority
15. Mutiny In Jonestown
16. Maybe Partying Will Help
17. Political Song For Michael Jackson To Sing
18. The Roar Of The Masses Could Be Farts
19. Mr. Robot's Holy Orders
20. One Reporter's Opinion
21. God Bows To Math
22. Please Don't Be Gentle With Me
23. Joe McCarthy's Ghost
24. The Punch Line
25. Definitions
26. The Anchor
27. Bob Dylan Wrote Propaganda Songs
28. This Ain't No Picnic
29. There Ain't Shit On TV Tonight
30. No Exchange
31. Self-Referenced
32. Dream Told By Moto
33. Corona
34. I Felt Like A Gringo
35. Do You Want New Wave Or Do You Want The Truth?
36. Little Man With A Gun In His Hand
- Acoustic Blowout (Public-access television Show) - Hollywood, CA - 1985, songs include:
1. Corona
2. Themselves
3. The Red And The Black
4. Badges
5. I Felt Like A Gringo
6. Time
7. Green River
8. Lost
9. Ack Ack Ack
10. History Lesson Pt. II
11. Tour Spiel
12. Little Man With A Gun In His Hand

== Reception ==
The A.V. Club declared "We Jam Econo catches a lot of what made the Minutemen great" and said "The cold comfort that We Jam Econo offers is the notion that genius is fleeting, and the best anyone can hope for is that someone will record it before it fades." Variety called it "a suitably unfussy tribute to a band that disdained even the slightest rock-star flash" and predicted the DVD release would be "a must-have for music aficionados." PopMatters said We Jam Econo was " an endearing, heartfelt documentary that's made by the devout, for the devout, but which is sure to win over anyone except the occasional racist who mistakenly intended to watch a movie about border vigilantes."
