= Minuteflag =

EP by Black Flag and Minutemen
- Released: 1986
- Recorded: March 3, 1985
- Genre: Funk rock; experimental rock
- Length: 14:32
- Language: English
- Label: SST (050)
- Producer: Greg Ginn

Black Flag chronology
In My Head (1985)	Minuteflag (1986)	Who's Got the 10½? (1986)

Minutemen chronology
3-Way Tie (For Last) (1985)	Minuteflag (1986)	Ballot Result (1987)

Minuteflag was an experimental jam band collaboration between members of the American punk bands Minutemen and Black Flag. Their only release, an EP, consists entirely of instrumentals with the exception of "Fetch the Water" which features D. Boon on lead vocals.

Recording took place in March 1985, while Black Flag was in the process of writing and recording Loose Nut at Total Access Studio in Redondo Beach, CA; Minutemen had just completed their Project: Mersh 12" EP at the same studio the month before. The members involved initially agreed that the material recorded during the Minuteflag sessions would not be released until at least one of the bands had disbanded. A 12" EP on SST Records as SST 050 came out over a year afterward, by which time Minutemen had disbanded after the car crash death of guitarist/vocalist D. Boon; Black Flag themselves split up later in 1986.

Professional ratings
Review scores
Source	Rating
Robert Christgau	D
Punknews.org	3.5/5 stars

== Track listing ==
1. "Fetch the Water" – 3:49
2. "Power Failure" – 3:43
3. "Friends" – 5:12
4. "Candy Rush" – 1:49

== Personnel ==
- D. Boon – lead and backing vocals, lyrics (track 1), guitar
- Greg Ginn – guitar
- George Hurley – bongo drum (tracks 1 and 2), bean can (tracks 3 and 4)
- Kira Roessler – backing vocals (track 1), bass
- Henry Rollins – lead and backing vocals (track 1)
- Bill Stevenson – drums
- Mike Watt – bass
