= The Nig-Heist =

Hardcore punk band

- Origin: Los Angeles, California, USA
- Genres: Punk rock, comedy rock, shock rock
- Years active: 1981-1984
- Labels: Thermidor Records, Drag City
- Past members: Steve "Mugger" Corbin; David "Davo" Classen; Bill Stevenson; Tom Trocolli; Dez Cadena; Ian MacKaye; Merrill Ward; D. Boon; Chuck Biscuits; SPOT; Greg Ginn

The Nig-Heist was a punk-comedy-shock rock band led by Steve "Mugger" Corbin, a roadie and live sound engineer for Black Flag and employee of SST Records. The Nig-Heist featured a revolving-door roster of members of the bands who were on tour with Black Flag at the moment. The band used to open for Black Flag on tour and recorded a 7", an LP and had tracks on compilations. They were notorious for their risqué stage antics, including band members playing naked, Mugger wearing a long-haired wig and insulting the crowd. Their songs were overtly vulgar and explicit in a funny way. Their motto was: "The band that cums in your mouth, not in your hands".

== History ==
The Nig-Heist was founded in 1981 in Los Angeles by Steve "Mugger" Corbin, who was a dropout who ran away from an abusive home in his early teens. He and other runaways eventually began to congregate at the Church, a former church that was converted into a band practice space, where they became immersed in the fledgling suburban hardcore punk scene. It was there that Mugger became acquainted with Greg Ginn and Black Flag. Ginn gave Mugger a job at his SST Electronics company. After becoming Black Flag's roadie, Mugger wanted to start his own band to bring some humor as well as antagonize the scene which he felt was overly-serious and crowded with lackluster bands. He recruited members of the bands who were on tour with Black Flag for his band and usually had them play a different instrument than they normally played.

On stage, Mugger played naked or in his underwear and would always wear a long-haired wig with a trucker cap and taunt punks and skinheads in the audience who didn't want to see any "long-haired faggot" on stage. Mugger often baited the crowd with statements like "I know your kind, you want to overthrow the government" and "if you think I'm a faggot, why don't you come up here and let me buttfuck you" while also asking female concert-goers for sexual favors.

The rest of the band usually played in disguise and under fake names or behind their amps. Band members generally included Black Flag's Greg Ginn, Kira Roessler, Chuck Dukowski, Dez Cadena or Chuck Biscuits; Bill Stevenson from the Descendents and Black Flag; D. Boon from the Minutemen; recording engineer SPOT; Dave "Davo" Classen (Black Flag's soundman); SST hangers-on Merrill Ward from Overkill and Tom Troccoli from Tom Trocolli's Dog; as well as Ian MacKaye from east-coast band Minor Threat. Because their songs were so sexist, the Nig-Heist didn't want to have a woman in the band. When Kira Roessler played bass in the band, she was hidden behind a curtain and a man pretended to play on stage.

The Nig-Heist's songs always revolved around sex, as evidenced by song titles like "Put My Love in Your Mouth", and "Balls of Fire", and dealt with their topic in purposely explicit and immature ways. Mugger later said the songs were inspired by an exaggerated version of his own youthful preoccupation with sex: "When you’re that age, what else do you think about?" Predictably, this approach angered most not in on the joke and the biggest cheers for the Nig-Heist typically came when they announced they were playing their last song, if they got a chance to do so. The band often had the plug pulled on them by club managers or were attacked by outraged audience members. If they weren't attacked, Mugger often got the last laugh by leaving stage, taking off his wig and moving through the audience, unnoticed. They made headlines in Denver in April 1984 when Mugger and Trocolli were arrested for lewd behavior onstage at The Rainbow Music Hall after the club owner was scandalized by their obscenity. They were jailed for indecent exposure and simulating anal intercourse and Greg Ginn bailed them out later. One of Mugger's lines he always said when angry people in the crowd started spitting on him was "Hey if you fags are going to spit on me, aim for my butthole so I have some lubrication for after the show"

In 1983, Joe Carducci's Thermidor Records released a one-song Nig-Heist 7" called Walking Down the Street with Raymond Pettibon artwork and, a year later, released the group's self-titled LP. Also in 1984, the Nig-Heist did their most extensive tour, opening for Black Flag and the Meat Puppets. By then, Mugger had also taken on an important role in running SST Records, splitting control of the label with Ginn, Dukowski, and co-owner Joe Carducci. Despite Mugger's position at the label, no Nig-Heist material was ever released on SST.

After 1984, Mugger left the road crew to concentrate on responsibilities at SST, marking the end of The Nig-Heist. Mugger remained with the label until the late 1980s when, after disagreements over the type of artists the label should sign, he was bought out by Ginn and Dukowski. Mugger, who had studied economics at UCLA while working for SST, used the money to invest in technology and became a computer industry mogul and a millionaire.

In 1998 Drag City Records released the Nig-Heist's discography on CD. The record included both of the Nig-Heist records as well as some demos and a disc of live shows.

== Members ==
- Steve "Mugger" Corbin - Lead Vocals
- Bill Stevenson - Guitar
- David "Davo" Classen - Drums
- Tom Trocolli - Bass
- SPOT - Drums
- Chuck Biscuits - Guitar
- Merrill Ward - Guitar
- Dez Cadena - Drums
- Ian MacKaye - Bass
- Kira Roessler - Bass
- Greg Ginn - Guitar
- Jack Brewer - Vocals
- d. Boon - Roadie

== Discography ==
=== Albums ===
- 1984: The Nig-Heist LP (Thermidor Records)
- 1997: Nig-Heist CD (Drag City Records)

Compilations

- 1981: Chunks LP (New Alliance Records) - features the track The Nig-Heist (The Last Generation)

=== Singles ===
- 1982: "Walking Down the Street" 7" (Thermidor Records)
