= Paranoid Time =

EP by Minutemen
- Released: 1980
- Recorded: July 20, 1980
- Studio: Media Art in Hermosa Beach, California
- Genre: Hardcore punk
- Length: 6:31
- Label: SST (002)
- Producer: Greg Ginn

Minutemen chronology
Paranoid Time (1980)	Joy (1981)

Paranoid Time is the debut EP by American hardcore punk band Minutemen. It is also the second ever release by the SST record label, founded by Black Flag's Greg Ginn and Chuck Dukowski. The album cover is a drawing by the American artist Raymond Pettibon.

== Background ==
Minutemen's first record occurred almost immediately after they opened for Black Flag in Minutemen's hometown of San Pedro, California. Black Flag guitarist Greg Ginn offered the group a chance to record and release a record, and a late night session at Media Art Studio in Hermosa Beach, California was booked.

== Recording ==
The group recorded all seven songs in the order in which they appear on the record, with no overdubbing except for backing vocals by the group and drummer George Hurley's brother Greg. At the beginning of "Joe McCarthy's Ghost", bassist Mike Watt can be heard telling guitarist D. Boon and the Hurley brothers, "You just sing 'Joe McCarthy', want to do that?". A discussion between the four participants can be heard underneath George Hurley's previously recorded drum introduction.

Ginn later told Minutemen how to put out a record, which spurred Watt and Boon to form New Alliance Records later that year.

The EP also appears as part of the My First Bells cassette (1985) and the Post-Mersh Vol. 3 CD. Two tracks from the EP, "Paranoid Chant" and "The Maze" appeared on the SST compilation The Blasting Concept.

A sample of the intro to "Joe McCarthy's Ghost" can be heard on one of the radio ads compiled on the "Crass Commercialism" track on Black Flag's Everything Went Black album.

== Packaging ==
Early released copies of the EP were printed with black artwork. All other editions are green. In 1982, in Trouser Press, Robert Payes said the record is "a must for the savage Ray Pettibone [sic] artwork alone." The following year, however, Byron Coley - writing for The Boston Phoenix - would note that the artwork didn't fit the music.

== Reception ==
Professional ratings
Review scores
Source	Rating
AllMusic	3/5 stars
The Great Rock Discography	5/10
The Rolling Stone Album Guide	3.5/5 stars
Spin Alternative Record Guide	8/10

John Leland and Ira Robbins wrote in Trouser Press that the EP "offers dogmatic politics redeemed by idiosyncratic Wire-type songs. Kicked along by drummer George Hurley, each abbreviated blurt of rhythm serves as a backdrop for the rants of bassist Mike Watt and guitarist D. Boon. The best is the apocalyptic “Paranoid Chant,” in which Boon screams, “I don’t even worry about crime anymore.”" According to Robert Christgau - who commented on it in his review of the band's first full-length album - the EP "could pass for speed-rock". Coley was more mixed: he found that the band's early music "didn't give much leeway to the imagination", going on to criticize the band's seriousness and the "naive wordplay" in their lyrics.

A retrospective review by Stephen Thomas Erlewine for AllMusic found the EP to be "a startlingly coherent set of primal minimalism -- a cross between Californian hardcore punk and the succinct experimentalism of Wire. It speeds by too quickly for any particular song to stand out, but the band's terse, frenetic energy is invigorating, as are their imaginative ideas." In a 2022 review of their second LP, Huw Baines says of Paranoid Time, "all the pieces are in the right places, from Watt’s wandering bass to Boon’s history-lesson-with-footnotes rants and lacerating leads".

== Track listing ==
Side A
No.	Title	Writer(s)	Length
1.	"Validation"	Tamburovich, Watt	0:38
2.	"The Maze"	Boon	0:39
3.	"Definitions"	Watt	1:13
4.	"Sickles and Hammers"	Boon, Watt	0:47

Side B
No.	Title	Writer(s)	Length
1.	"Fascist"	Boon	0:56
2.	"Joe McCarthy's Ghost"	Watt	0:59
3.	"Paranoid Chant"	Watt	1:19
Total length:			6:31

== Personnel ==
Minutemen

- D. Boon - guitar, vocals
- Mike Watt - bass, vocals
- George Hurley - drums, backing vocals

with:

- Greg Hurley - backing vocals on "Joe McCarthy's Ghost" and "Paranoid Chant"

== Production ==
- Greg Ginn - record producer
- Spot - engineer
