= The Politics of Time =

Compilation album by Minutemen
- Released: 1984
- Recorded: January 1979 to September 24, 1983
- Genre: Hardcore punk
- Length: 33:47
- Label: New Alliance
- Producer: various producers

Minutemen chronology
Buzz or Howl Under the Influence of Heat (1983)	The Politics of Time (1984)	Double Nickels on the Dime (1984)

Professional ratings
Review scores
Source	Rating
AllMusic	3/5 stars
The Boston Phoenix	3/4 stars
Christgau's Record Guide: The '80s	B−
MusicHound Rock	2/5 stars
The Rolling Stone Album Guide	3/5 stars

The Politics of Time is the first compilation album by American hardcore punk band Minutemen, released in 1984 through New Alliance Records.

Released in between their Buzz or Howl Under the Influence of Heat 12-inch EP and Double Nickels on the Dime double album on their own New Alliance Records label, the album compiles seven tracks meant for a non-SST Minutemen studio album that never materialized, a variety of live tracks of varying recording quality (most done with ordinary cassette machines), and a recording by their predecessor group The Reactionaries.

Part of the sleeve note on the back cover facetiously asks listeners to "note the quality of the recording" on the live version of "Fanatics" (from The Punch Line). While the recording is an almost undiscernible mess, the cut is apparently included for its historical importance as according to Henry Rollins in his book Get In The Van, on this night at the end of the song, D. Boon had jumped into the audience with his guitar on, hollering the title word of the song while "knock[ing] those skinheads [in the audience] over like bowling pins".

Also of note is a live recording of "Futurism Restated", which had earlier appeared on the 7-inch EP Bean-Spill. The version that appears on this album contains a full extra verse of lyrics not found in the other version (although the lyrics are almost completely undiscernable and the album lacks a lyric sheet).

The Politics of Time would later end up as a song title on Double Nickels on the Dime.

SST Records, after buying New Alliance from Mike Watt and Martin Tamburovich in 1987, reissued The Politics of Time on SST in 1987 on vinyl and cassette, as part of the Post-Mersh Vol. 3 CD in 1989, and as its own CD in 1991.

== Track listing ==
Side one

1. "Base King" (Boon, Watt) - 1:12
2. "Working Men are Pissed" (Watt) - 1:17
3. "I Shook Hands" (Watt) - 0:58
4. "Below the Belt" (Hurley, Watt) - 0:56
5. "Shit You Hear at Parties" (Boon, Watt) - 1:06
6. "The Big Lounge Scene" (Watt) - 1:23
7. "Maternal Rite" (Boon) - 1:13
  - These seven tracks recorded November 1981 at Casbah Studio, Fullerton, California. Remixed July 1983 by Ethan James
8. "Tune for Wind God" (Baiza, Boon, Hurley, Watt) - 3:05
  - Recorded April 24, 1983, at a dried riverbed in the Mojave Desert near Victorville, California, by Bruce Licher.
9. "Party With Me Punker" (Watt) - 0:54
  - Recorded July 12, 1983, at Minutemen's practice place in Long Beach, California, by Richard Derrick and James Ellis
10. "The Process" (Boon, Watt) - 1:17
11. "Joy Jam" (Spot, Boon, Hurley, Watt) - 4:46
  - These two tracks recorded live November 27, 1982, at KPFK in Studio City, California by Andrea 'Enthal.

Side two

1. "Tony Gets Wasted in Pedro" (Lazaroff, Watt) - 2:10
  - Recorded January 1979 in the shed behind George Hurley's house as The Reactionaries.
2. "Swing to the Right" (Watt) - 0:41
3. "¡Raza Si!" (Watt) - 0:58
  - Recorded September 1980 in George Hurley's shed.
4. "Times" (Watt) - 0:45
5. "Badges" (Watt) - 0:35
  - Demo recordings done by Mike Watt in his living room without D. Boon or George Hurley.
6. "Fodder" (Boon, Watt) - 0:42
7. "Futurism Restated" (Joe Boon, Watt) - 1:30
8. "Hollering" (Watt) - 0:58
9. "Suburban Dialectic" (Watt) - 0:42
10. "Contained" (Hurley, Watt) - 0:57
11. "On Trial" – 0:39 (Watt)
12. "Spraycan Wars" (Watt) - 0:55
  - These seven songs recorded live December 26, 1980, at the Bla Bla Cafe in Studio City, California, by Joe Baiza.
13. "My Part" (Boon) - 1:35
  - Recorded live February 28, 1983, in Copenhagen, Denmark by Black Flag roadie Mugger.
14. "Fanatics" (Watt) - 0:32
  - Recorded live March 4, 1983, in Brixton, England
15. "Ack Ack Ack" (Talley-Jones, Johansen) - 0:41
  - Recorded live March 1, 1983, in Arhus, Denmark by Johnny Concrete. A cover of The Urinals song.
16. "The Big Blast for Youth" (Tamburovich, Vandenberg, Boon, Hurley, Watt) - 1:20
  - Recorded live September 24, 1983, at the Longshoremen's Ball in Wilmington, California.

== Personnel ==
Minutemen

- D. Boon – vocals, guitar
- Mike Watt – vocals, bass
- George Hurley – drums

with:

- Joe Baiza – second guitar on "Tune for Wind God"
- Spot – clarinet on "Joy Jam"
- Martin Tamburovich – lead vocals on "Tony Gets Wasted in Pedro", saxophone on "The Big Blast for Youth"
- Dirk Vandenberg – trumpet on "The Big Blast for Youth"
