= My First Bells =

Compilation album by The Minutemen
- Released: 1985
- Recorded: 1980–1983
- Genre: Alternative rock, hardcore punk, post-punk
- Label: SST (032)

Professional ratings
Review scores
Source	Rating
AllMusic	4.5/5 stars

My First Bells is a compilation album by the American punk rock band Minutemen, released on SST Records in 1985.

The collection was released as a cassette and included the Minutemen's first five EPs and LPs, recorded and released between 1980 and 1983. It also included three songs released on other compilations: "9:30 May 2", "Clocks" and "Prelude".

The release totaled 62 songs. It included:

- Paranoid Time EP, 1980, 7 songs
- "9:30 May 2" (released on compilation Cracks in the Sidewalk in 1980)
- "Clocks" (released on compilation Chunks in 1981)
- Joy EP, 1981, 3 songs
- The Punch Line LP, 1981, 18 songs
- Bean-Spill EP, 1982, 5 songs
- "Prelude" (written by Marc Bolan, released on compilation Life is Good, So Why Not Eat Health Foods in 1983)
- What Makes a Man Start Fires? LP, 1983, 18 songs
- Buzz or Howl Under the Influence of Heat EP, 1983, 8 songs

== Reception ==
John Dougan called the album "A superb collection." Critic Ira Robbins called it "essential." Jon Pareles of The New York Times said "Minutemen crammed telegraphic lyrics and allusions to blues, rock, Captain Beefheart and jazz into songs that generally lasted less than two minutes each" while saying the songs have "bite" and "virtuosity."
