= Rob Roberge =

American writer and musician

Rob Roberge (born June 22, 1966) is an American writer, guitarist, singer, writing and narrative theory professor, researcher, and developer.

== Life ==
Rob Roberge was born in Bridgeport, Connecticut. He studied writing at Emerson College and Vermont College where he received an MFA in the early 1990s, since 1995, he has lived in Southern California.

In 2013, Roberge released his fourth book of fiction, the novel The Cost of Living (Other Voices Books). Previous books include the story collection Working Backwards from the Worst Moment of My Life (Red Hen, 2010), the novels More Than They Could Chew (Dark Alley/Harper Collins, 2005) and Drive (re-print, Hollyridge Press, 2006/2010). His stories have been featured in ZYZZYVA, Chelsea, Black Clock, Other Voices, Alaska Quarterly Review, and the "Ten Writers Worth Knowing" issue of The Literary Review. His fiction and non-fiction have also been published in Penthouse, The Rumpus, The Nervous Breakdown and anthologized in Another City (City Lights, 2001), It's All Good (Manic D Press, 2004), SANTI: Lives of the Modern Saints (Black Arrow Press, 2007), OC Noir (Akashic,) 2008 The Devil's Punchbowl (Red Hen, 2010), and New California Writing (Heyday, 2012). A number of his plays have been staged in Southern California and Honest Pete, a short film he wrote, directed and edited has shown at several festivals He's a core faculty member at UCR/Palm Desert's MFA and has taught at several colleges and universities including University of California, Riverside; Antioch Los Angeles; and the UCLA Extension Writers’ Program, where he received the Outstanding Instructor Award in Creative Writing in 2003. He's a frequent guest writer, lecturer, and has judged, among others, the Red Hen Story Prize and the University of Ohio/Athens PhD writing award. Currently, he serves as the advisor for the PEN Mark program. Roberge has volunteered for a number of organizations, including 826 LA, various after-school arts programs in Long Beach, CA, and Jail Guitar Doors. He plays guitar and sings with the LA bands The Danbury Shakes, The Violet Rays, and the Urinals.

== Works ==
=== Novels ===
- More Than They Could Chew. HarperCollins. February 2005. ISBN 978-0-06-074280-5. Drive
- Working Backwards from the Worst Moment of My Life. Black Arrow Press. 2008. ISBN 978-0-9798908-1-9.
- Drive. Hollyridge Press. 2006. ISBN 978-0-9772298-4-0. (reprint)

=== Short stories ===
- "Swiss Engineering", ZYZZYVA
- "Money and the Getting of Money," Sensitive Skin magazine

=== Anthologies ===
- Another City (City Lights, 2001)
- It's All Good (Manic D Press, 2004)
- SANTI: Lives of the Modern Saints (Black Arrow Press, 2007).
