= Tour-Spiel =

EP by Minutemen
- Released: 1985
- Genre: Alternative rock, hardcore punk, post-punk
- Label: Reflex Records

Tour-Spiel is an EP by Minutemen, released in 1985. It contains four songs, all covers. A studio version of track 1 appears on Double Nickels on the Dime. Studio versions of "Lost" and "The Red and The Black", with different musical arrangements, appear on 3-Way Tie (For Last).

The songs were recorded in the studio of a Tucson radio station.

Tour-Spiel is included on 1989's Post-Mersh Vol. 3.

== Track listing ==
1. "Ain't Talkin' 'Bout Love" (Van Halen)
2. "The Red and the Black" (Blue Öyster Cult)
3. "Green River" (Creedence Clearwater Revival)
4. "Lost" (Meat Puppets)
