= Easy Reader =

Newspaper in Hermosa Beach, California

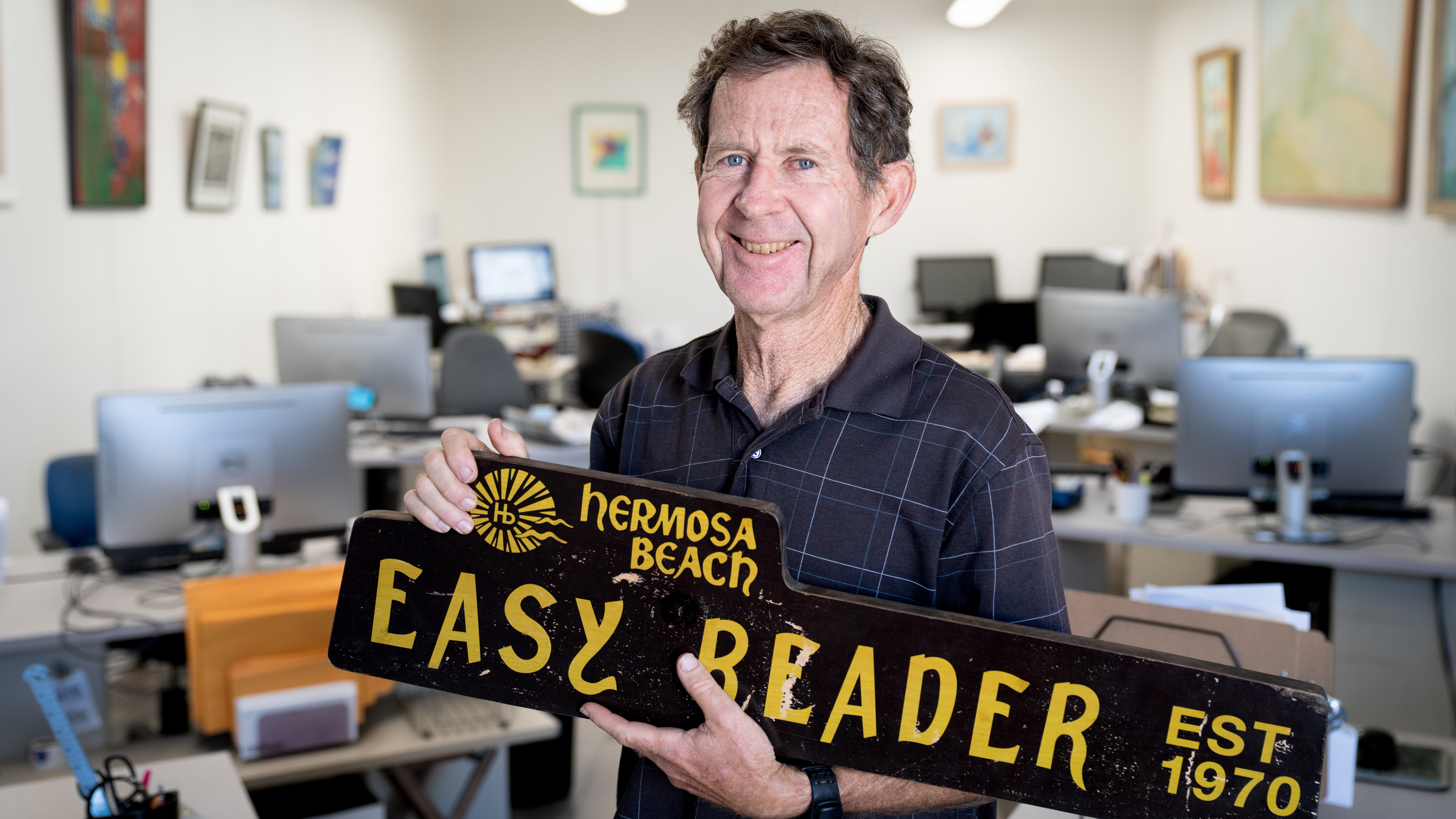
- Publisher Kevin Cody at the newspaper offices, 2021
- Type: Weekly newspaper
- Format: Tabloid
- Owner: Kevin Cody
- Founded: 1970
- Headquarters: 2200 PCH, #101. Hermosa Beach, CA 90254; United States
- Circulation: 45,000 weekly
- Website: easyreadernews.com

The Easy Reader is a weekly newspaper founded in 1970 and published every Thursday, being delivered to homes in Hermosa Beach, Manhattan Beach, and Redondo Beach (Beach Cities/South Bay, California), with a circulation it claims of approximately 45,000 weekly, offering local news and extensive entertainment listings. It is the legally adjudicated newspaper for the cities of Hermosa Beach and Redondo Beach.
