= The Reactionaries =

American punk rock band

- Origin: San Pedro, Los Angeles, California, U.S.
- Genres: Punk
- Years active: 1978–1979
- Labels: New Alliance Records, Water Under the Bridge Records (both posthumously)
- Members: Martin Tamburovich; D. Boon; Mike Watt; George Hurley

The Reactionaries were an American punk rock band formed in San Pedro, Los Angeles, California, in 1978. The band's continual members were lead vocalist Martin Tamburovich, guitarist D. Boon, bassist Mike Watt, and drummer George Hurley. The Reactionaries existed for most of 1978 and 1979, practicing regularly but rarely if ever performing live. After their breakup in late 1979, Watt and Boon formed Minutemen with drummer Frank Tonche and Hurley joined Hey Taxi!; Hurley joined Minutemen soon afterwards, replacing Tonche.

== History ==
At the time, San Pedro was more receptive to classic rock cover bands than to original acts, and the nearby Los Angeles' punk scene was not yet prepared to take a band from San Pedro seriously. One band that did take the group seriously was another struggling L.A. punk band, Black Flag.

Tamburovich's influence and input remained with his friends and former bandmates for the whole of Minutemen's existence; Watt, Boon, and Tamburovich co-founded New Alliance Records in 1980; Tamburovich would contribute lyrics to several Minutemen songs and sometimes travel with the band as a roadie.

No formal studio recordings of The Reactionaries exist, but a demo recording (possibly from a rehearsal tape) made in January 1979 of the song "Tony Gets Wasted In Pedro" appears on Minutemen's odds-and-sods compilation album The Politics of Time, first released in 1984 on New Alliance. When Tamburovich died of a bacterial infection in 2003, Watt played "Tony Gets Wasted In Pedro" in tribute to his friend on his internet radio show The Watt from Pedro Show.

In 2009, a San Pedro-based independent label, Water Under the Bridge Records, released The Reactionaries' first record. The first side of the LP contains ten songs that The Reactionaries recorded in George Hurley's Shed in 1979, fully re-mastered from the original tape. The second side contains the same ten songs re-recorded by four decades of different San Pedro musicians (including George Hurley and Mike Watt). The record, titled 1979, was released on February 20, 2010.
