= The Punch Line =

Studio album by Minutemen
- Released: November 1, 1981
- Recorded: July 1981
- Studios: Media Art, Hermosa Beach, California
- Genre: Hardcore punk
- Length: 15:00
- Label: SST (004)
- Producer: Spot

Minutemen chronology
Joy (1981)	The Punch Line (1981)	Bean-Spill (1982)

The Punch Line is the debut studio album and third overall release by American punk rock band Minutemen, and the fourth release from SST Records. After their previous release, Paranoid Time, sold out its 300-copy pressing, Greg Ginn invited the band to record again. Less than half the length of most LPs, the total playing time for all 18 songs is a mere 15 minutes. The album was an early milestone release for the band and SST. The Punch Line hit record store shelves three months after the release of Joy, although Joy was recorded after The Punch Line.

The Punch Line also appears on the My First Bells cassette and the Post-Mersh Vol. 1 CD. The opening track, "Search", represented Minutemen on the second Rodney on the ROQ compilation album on Posh Boy Records, while four other songs, including the title track, were featured on the compilation cassette The Future Looks Bright Ahead, jointly issued by Posh Boy and SST in 1981. "Boiling" and "Games" were featured on the seminal SST compilation The Blasting Concept.

== Recording ==
Minutemen, seeking to be as economical as possible in recording their first album, recorded The Punch Line during a late-night session (when studio time was the cheapest), recorded on previously used tape, and recorded the songs exactly in the order in which they appeared on the record, essentially live. Overdubs were minimal if anything; Hurley's vocal on "Ruins" was actually cut during the basic track stages and picked up by the overhead drum mics.

Spot revealed during his interview for the Minutemen documentary We Jam Econo (preserved in the DVD's deleted scenes section) that the first pressing of the record was done with what he considered to be an inferior mastering job and set of stampers; he took possession of the stampers in order to prevent further pressings from being done, forcing a remaster that was used on all vinyl pressings since then. The remastered vocals sound significantly different from the original pressing in which the voices are deeper and slightly muffled.

== Content ==
The Punch Line is also notable for being the only album to feature lead vocals from all three Minutemen. Bassist and primary songwriter Mike Watt sings lead vocals on several tracks, including the opening track "Search", "Ruins", and the last 3 of the album, "Gravity", "Warfare" and "Static", while drummer George Hurley does a lead vocal (referred to on the album's back cover as "giv(ing) a speech") in the middle of "Ruins".

The title track makes fun of General George A. Custer's death at the hands of Sitting Bull during the Battle of the Little Bighorn.

Another track on the album, the instrumental "Song For El Salvador", reflects D. Boon's support of the Farabundo Martí National Liberation Front in El Salvador. (He was a member of the NGO Committee in Solidarity with the People of El Salvador, or CISPES).

Even though the group's name was a reference to their personal and political ideology and not a reflection of the average length of their songs, only two songs on The Punch Line pass the one-minute mark. Most average between 45 and 60 seconds.

== Reception ==
Professional ratings
Review scores
Source	Rating
AllMusic	3/5 stars
The Boston Phoenix	3/4 stars
The Encyclopedia of Popular Music	2/5 stars
The Great Rock Discography	4/10
MusicHound Rock	4/5 stars
The Village Voice	B

In a 1982 Trouser Press review, Robert Payes describes the album as containing "[c]hoppy guitar syncopations and abstract, thought-provoking lyrics [that] front songs that combine snatches of Wiry art/punk/jazz." Payes concludes that the record is "worthy of your time." Robert Christgau was more mixed, calling the band "politniks who love punk, with a name that mocks hardcore's rightwing rep and their own aesthetic--these eighteen "songs" average under fifty seconds apiece. The lyrics don't rhyme or even scan, less poems than the jottings of young men given to cultural bullshit. [...] not Fredric Jameson, but better-informed than the skinheads they play for." He notes that "where last year's seven-inch Paranoid Time could pass for speed-rock, the funky dissonance here has no parallel in the genre or anywhere else: not Ornette Coleman, but better-informed than the Circle Jerks they play with." Milo Miles of The Boston Phoenix was equally put off by the album's format: "The EP’s 18 cuts average less than 60 seconds each, rudely biting off any grooves or hooks that threaten to settle in; and just to make sure, the Minutemen rotate rhythm leads and switch the center of attention with, uh, harmelodic equality."

In its retrospective AllMusic entry, Mark Deming notes that the album "works better as a unified sonic assault than as a collection of tunes, but moments do stand out, especially "Tension," "Fanatics," and the title cut, which certainly lends a new perspective to Native American history." He concludes by calling the album "as wildly inventive as anything spawned by American punk, and the band would only get better on subsequent releases."

== Track listing ==
"this side"
No.	Title	Writer(s)	Length
1.	"Search"	George Hurley, Mike Watt	0:53
2.	"Tension"	Martin Tamburovich, Watt	1:20
3.	"Games"	D. Boon, Watt	1:04
4.	"Boiling"	Hurley, Watt	0:57
5.	"Disguises"	Boon	0:48
6.	"The Struggle"	Boon	0:41
7.	"Monuments"	Hurley, Watt	0:51
8.	"Ruins"	Hurley, Watt	0:49
9.	"Issued"	Hurley, Watt	0:41

"other side"
No.	Title	Writer(s)	Length
10.	"The Punch Line"	Watt	0:41
11.	"Song for El Salvador"	Boon	0:32
12.	"History Lesson"	Boon	0:38
13.	"Fanatics"	Watt	0:31
14.	"No Parade"	Boon	0:51
15.	"Straight Jacket"	Watt	0:59
16.	"Gravity"	Hurley, Watt	0:57
17.	"Warfare"	Hurley, Watt	0:55
18.	"Static"	Boon, Watt	0:52
Total length:			15:00

== Personnel ==
Minutemen

- D. Boon - guitar and vocals
- Mike Watt - bass and vocals
- George Hurley - drums, lead vocal in the middle of "Ruins"

Production

- Spot - record producer, recording engineer

Artwork

- D. Boon - front cover
- George Hurley - back cover
