= Corona (song) =

Song by Minutemen

from the album Double Nickels on the Dime
- Released: July 3, 1984
- Recorded: November 1983/April 1984
- Genre: Cowpunk; psychobilly; norteño
- Length: 2:25
- Label: SST
- Songwriter: D. Boon
- Producer: Ethan James

"Corona" is a protest song by American punk rock band Minutemen. It was included as the seventh song on the second side of their third studio album Double Nickels on the Dime (1984). The song was composed by lead singer and guitarist D. Boon and produced by Ethan James. Its minimalist composition harbors elements of neo-norteño and polka. The song derives its title from a brand of Mexican beer of the same name. Lyrically, "Corona" is a Latino-inspired protest song with politically-charged lines. The song later became famous as the main theme song for the MTV reality stunt show Jackass.

== Background ==
Named after the brand of Mexican beer, "Corona" is a protest song.

The song was inspired by short vacation the band members (Boon, bassist Mike Watt, and drummer George Hurley) had taken to Mexico on the Fourth of July, 1982. The same trip also inspired Watt's composition "I Felt Like a Gringo" on Buzz or Howl Under the Influence of Heat.

Boon was moved by the sight of a woman who was collecting beer bottles to collect the cash deposit for returning the bottles to the store. He subsequently wrote a song in sympathy with the Mexican people.

== Recording ==
Towards the end of their career, Minutemen started to branch out musically with their songs. In contrast to typical rapid tempos found in hardcore punk, the band experimented with neo-norteña sounds built on polka rhythms for "Corona." Drawing from post-punk alongside more eclectic musical influences, their music is an interaction between Hurley's virtuosic drumming, Boon's trebly electric guitar, and Watt's busy bassline. Regarding their songwriting, Watt claimed, "We don't write songs, we write rivers."

== Composition ==
"Corona" is an uptempo hardcore punk and neo-norteña song that runs for a duration of two minutes and twenty-five seconds. The song is in the key of G major and is built mainly around the chords of G, B minor, and D, with an A minor chord appearing during the final line of each stanza. It features driving guitar riffs, a burly yet funky bassline, and frantic drumbeats. The song opens with an introduction, where a twanging guitar riff is played. Its minimalist arrangement contains no choruses, and is instead composed of fifty-three words structured into three stanzas.

Lyrically, "Corona" is a Latino protest song and an elegiac complaint regarding the injustice and destructive greed of the United States. Lead singer-guitarist D Boon closes by singing about a bottle of Corona beer. The bottle is intended for a poor woman on a beach in Mexico, due to its five-cent deposit.

== Critical reception ==
In his review of their album, Juan Gutierrez from LA Weekly wrote, "Minutemen's song 'Corona' finally broke big due to Jackass, but it was D. Boon's political lyrics, driving guitar riffs, and George Hurley's frantic drumming that make Double Nickels on the Dime hardcore perfection. Billboard's Michael Azerrad's described the song as an "ocean of scrabbling avant-funk, Norteño two-step."

== Commercial performance ==
In March 2020, "Corona" was among countless previously released songs with titles and lyrical themes about the world ending or human survival, prompting an increase in sales and streaming. This increase occurred as populations adjusted to life in self-quarantine during the worldwide coronavirus (COVID-19) pandemic. The gains "Corona" experienced included a 70% rise in digital song sales and a 26% increase in total on-demand U.S. streams to 63,000. The following week, "Corona" rose 95% in U.S. streams to 122,000 for the tracking week ending March 19.

== Legacy ==
In the 2000s, "Corona" became world-famous as the theme song of the MTV reality television series Jackass. The song was immortalized on the stunt show, which used its trademark opening guitar riff. In the series, stuntmen subject themselves to life-threatening tests of courage and self-harm. Watt said royalty money the band received from the song's use in Jackass was given to Boon's father, who was ill with emphysema. Watt felt it was poignant and “trippy” that Boon could posthumously support his father with a heartfelt song that was initially inspired by a woman trying to support her children but ultimately became associated with a TV show about “people getting tasered in the balls.”

Canadian singer-songwriter Ford Pier claimed the songwriting approach for "Great Western" from his debut studio album Meconium was inspired by "Corona". He stated, "I had a desire to try to write a song in that style favoured by your journeyman singer-songwriters of pseudo-literary inclination where an ancillary detail or object within the narrative is selected to be the symbolic fulcrum of the whole thing. ... 'Corona' by the Minutemen would have been a touchstone in this approach."

== Cover versions ==
Arizona indie rock band Calexico performed a cover of "Corona" during a concert at the 2013 Newport Folk Festival in Newport, Rhode Island; their cover version was included on the playlist "COVID Quarantine Dance Party" by musician Lo Bradley. "Corona" was among many popular songs found in most quarantine-themed playlists.
