= Project Mersh =

Project: Mersh

EP by Minutemen
- Released: April 8, 1985
- Recorded: February 1985
- Genre: Punk rock
- Length: 22:14
- Language: English
- Label: SST (034)
- Producer: Joe Carducci

Minutemen chronology
Double Nickels on the Dime (1984)	Project: Mersh (1985)	3-Way Tie (For Last) (1985)

Project: Mersh is the final extended play by American punk rock trio Minutemen, released on April 8, 1985, through SST Records. It is the band's penultimate release before the death of frontman and composer D. Boon later that year due to injuries sustained in an auto accident.

== Background ==
The cover art is a painting by D. Boon depicting a meeting of three exhausted record label executives in which one of them says "I got it! We'll have them write hit songs!" Project: Mersh was a sarcastic and ironic attempt at a commercial (or "mersh") recording rather than their "econo" method. Though, as bassist Mike Watt pointed out in a 1985 Bard College interview, "It's only mersh because we said it was mersh, it only sold about half as much as our art record Double Nickels on the Dime." All six songs surpass the two-minute mark ("More Spiel" is nearly six minutes long) and incorporate verses, choruses, hooks, and fade outs, in contrast to nearly all the band's previous recordings. Crane, who provided backing vocals and played the trumpet on Buzz or Howl Under the Influence of Heat, returned to lend his voice and instrumentals to the album. The album even utilizes a synthesizer, which was played by Ethan James who produced their previous album Double Nickels on the Dime. The album also features a cover of Steppenwolf's "Hey Lawdy Mama."

== Reception ==
Professional ratings
Review scores
Source	Rating
AllMusic	4.5/5 stars
Christgau's Record Guide: The '80s	B+
The Great Rock Discography	6/10
The Rolling Stone Album Guide	3/5 stars

Byron Coley at Spin said "it seemed a forward-moving continuation of the form annihilation the band had undertaken with Double Nickels on the Dime. The band seem like San Pedro, California's branch of the Sun Ra Arkestra at one moment and the '85 version of Cream the next."

== Track listing ==
Side one

1. "The Cheerleaders" (D. Boon) – 3:52
2. "King of the Hill" (Boon) – 3:24
3. "Hey Lawdy Mama" – 3:37 (Larry Byrom, Jerry Edmonton & John Kay of Steppenwolf)

Side two

1. "Take Our Test" (Mike Watt) – 2:44
2. "Tour-Spiel" (Watt) – 2:45
3. "More Spiel" (Watt) – 5:52

== Personnel ==
Minutemen

- D. Boon – guitar, singing
- George Hurley – drums, sound effects, wood block
- Mike Watt – bass guitar, backing vocals, acoustic guitar, speech

Additional musicians

- Crane – trumpet, backing vocals
- Ethan James – synthesizer, backing vocals

== Charts ==
Chart (1985)	Peak position
UK Indie Chart	21
