= Buzz or Howl Under the Influence of Heat =

EP by Minutemen
- Released: November 1983
- Recorded: January 3, 30 and May 23, 1983
- Genre: Hardcore punk; avant-garde; jazz rock
- Length: 15:30
- Label: SST (016)
- Producer: Ethan James, Spot

Minutemen chronology
What Makes a Man Start Fires? (1983)	Buzz or Howl Under the Influence of Heat (1983)	The Politics of Time (1984)

Buzz or Howl Under the Influence of Heat is the fourth EP (and sixth overall release) by American hardcore punk band Minutemen, released by SST Records in November 1983.

The EP is noted for featuring tracks with greater depth and more conventional song structure than on the band's previous releases.

== Background ==
Buzz or Howl Under the Influence of Heat is Minutemen's first 12-inch EP.

The EP was recorded rather cheaply even by Minutemen standards; the cost was $50. Most of the songs were cut live to two-track tape at Total Access Studio in Redondo Beach, CA, as opposed to using a multi-track tape recorder, with longtime SST Records staff producer Spot behind the mixing board. Spot had suggested the live-to-two-track approach after Minutemen queried about the possibility of recording a new EP on four-channel multi-track tape, rather than the 16-track recordings the band had done in the past. This meant that most of the songs on Buzz or Howl... were recorded without any overdubs. The exceptions were the first three tracks on the EP, which were the first recordings Minutemen had done with producer/engineer Ethan James, who would go on to work with them on their seminal double album Double Nickels on the Dime later in 1984.

The sessions cost a total of $50, which covered the live-to-two-track sessions with Spot at Total Access. The Radio Tokyo sessions with Ethan James were done for free, in return for allowing a Minutemen track to appear on the compilation The Radio Tokyo Tapes.

== Song history ==
Members of Black Flag were direct inspiration for three of the songs on Buzz or Howl...'. "Cut" was written by Mike Watt in admiration of Black Flag guitarist Greg Ginn's playing style; Henry Rollins provided the title for the improvised instrumental "Dreams Are Free, Motherfucker!" (which was actually a segment of a warm-up jam done with trumpet player Crane at the beginning of the January 30th session); and original Black Flag bassist Chuck Dukowski wrote some of the lyrics to "Little Man with a Gun in His Hand" and gave them to D. Boon at the end of both bands' 1982 European tour.

"I Felt Like a Gringo" is an autobiographical song written by Watt about a day trip Minutemen took in Mexico on July 4, 1982. There was an election that day for President of Mexico, which was referenced in the lyric "Who won," I said, "the election?" (the winner in question was Miguel de la Madrid).The same trip would also inspire the D. Boon composition "Corona" on Double Nickels....

"The Toe Jam" is another improvised cut, recorded the same day as "Dreams Are Free, Motherfucker", only with another band friend, Dirk Vandenburg (who would also do photography on several Minutemen covers, including Double Nickels...) playing drums, while drummer George Hurley attempted to play Crane's trumpet, Crane did some scat-singing, and another friend ad-libbed a poem about wanting to wear a wedding ring on her second toe (hence the name of the song).

According to the liner notes of the live compilation album Ballot Result, Mike Watt believed "Little Man with a Gun in His Hand" may be about, or have been inspired by, Black Flag's longtime roadie and lead singer and founder of the Nig-Heist, Steve "Mugger" Corbin. However, Dukowski stated in an interview for the 33⅓ book series' volume on Double Nickels... (written by Michael T. Fournier) that the song actually stems from existentialist ideas he had at the time.

== Packaging ==
The front cover of the album was initially intended to incorporate a color photograph from National Geographic that SST had permission to use; unfortunately, doing the color separation for the front cover proved to be cost-prohibitive for SST at the time. Instead, a black-and-white ink drawing of D. Boon and Mike Watt having an argument while various items fly around in the background, drawn by Saccharine Trust guitarist Joe Baiza, was used.

The back cover of the album features a Raymond Pettibon drawing of a sleepwalking man with the caption, "A Happy Person"; a reproduction of a letter to Watt from Richard Meltzer apologizing for missing a Minutemen concert that he was invited to; and, amongst the pictures of the band, a headshot of D. Boon that, years later, would become a popular sticker with the caption, "Punk is whatever we make it to be."

The title of the album came from an article in Scientific American entitled "The Amateur Scientist, February 1983."

== Critical reception ==
Professional ratings
Review scores
Source	Rating
AllMusic	4.5/5 stars
The Boston Phoenix	3.5/4 stars
The Encyclopedia of Popular Music	3/5 stars
The Rolling Stone Album Guide	4/5 stars
Spin Alternative Record Guide	9/10
The Village Voice	A−

In a 1984 Trouser Press review, John Leland said, "D. Boon howls stripped poetic shorthand at full blast over the band's churning Beefheartian funk, as the Minutemen test the extent to which they can fracture their groove and still retain cohesiveness...This EP's eight songs all sound entirely different from each other. The Minutemen flirt with noise, blues, even jazz. And they keep getting better." Robert Christgau was also quite positive in reviewing the album for The Village Voice, writing: "These guys define the future of atavism if anybody does. Subtle structures and sharp musicianship--rhythm-slasher D. Boon is as much a guitar antihero as labelmates Bob Mould and Greg Ginn--serves music that continues to seem primitive, even crudely offhand; lyrics articulate, elaborate, and, that's right, criticize the fucked-up despair of the world where they make their living and preach their uncoercive gospel--the fucked-up despair that in true hardcore makes such a great excuse for not thinking."

=== Legacy ===
Jeff Tweedy named the EP as a major formative influence on him during his early twenties: "They liked Steely Dan, Blue Öyster Cult, even Van Halen. That was liberating for kids like me at punk rock shows who were being ostracized for liking anything other than what you’re supposed to like." Steve Albini picked the album for NME's "101 Albums to Hear Before You Die" list (on which it ranked at No. 19), writing: "I could have named any of their records, which are all nearly perfect. To say that Minutemen influenced me, and an entire population of others, is such a gross understatement, it’s like saying the Civil War had ‘some effect’ on the slave trade."

== Track listing ==
Side one

1. "Self-Referenced" (Watt) - 1:23
2. "Cut" (Watt) - 2:02
3. "Dream Told by Moto" (Watt) - 1:45
4. "Dreams Are Free, Motherfucker!" (Boon, Watt, Hurley, Crane) - 1:09
5. "The Toe Jam" (Cooper, Vandenberg, Crane, Hurley, Boon, Watt) - 0:40

Side two

1. "I Felt Like a Gringo" (Watt) - 1:57
2. "The Product" (Boon) - 2:44
3. "Little Man With a Gun in His Hand" (Dukowski, Boon) - 3:10

== Personnel ==
Minutemen

- D. Boon – guitar, vocals
- Mike Watt – bass, vocals (lead vocals on "Cut")
- George Hurley – drums, backing vocals ("The Toe Jam"), trumpet ("The Toe Jam"), recorder ("The Product")

with:

- Crane – trumpet ("The Product"), recorder ("Dreams Are Free, Motherfucker!"), backing vocals ("Toe Jam" and "The Product")
- Dirk Vandenberg – drums ("The Toe Jam")
- Mary Cooper – vocals ("The Toe Jam")
