= Joy (Minutemen EP) =

EP by The Minutemen
- Released: August 1981
- Recorded: August 1, 1981
- Genre: Hardcore punk
- Length: 3:18
- Label: New Alliance(original); SST (214) (reissue)
- Producer: Mike Patton

The Minutemen chronology
Paranoid Time (1980)	Joy (1981)	The Punch Line (1981)

Professional ratings
Review scores
Source	Rating
Allmusic	link

Joy is the second EP by American hardcore punk band Minutemen. Recorded not long after the release of their first EP Paranoid Time, it is also the first release on Minutemen's own label New Alliance Records. Their first studio album The Punch Line was released three months after Joy, but Joy was recorded after The Punch Line.

The EP also appears as part of the My First Bells cassette and the Post-Mersh Vol. 3 CD, both on SST Records. SST reissued the EP in 1987 not long after buying New Alliance Records from Mike Watt. When SST took over the New Alliance label and back catalogue, the label redated the copyright on the EP to be 1987, causing some fans to believe that the EP contained previously unreleased material. The EP was also reissued as a 10" colored vinyl EP and in 1988 as a three-inch CD. Joy was recorded and mixed in five hours.

== Track listing ==
Side A
No.	Title	Writer(s)	Length
1.	"Joy"	Hurley, Watt	0:52
2.	"Black Sheep"	Hurley, Watt	1:06

Side B
No.	Title	Writer(s)	Length
1.	"More Joy"	Boon, Cadena, Watt	1:06

== Personnel ==
Minutemen

- D. Boon – guitar, vocals
- Mike Watt – bass
- George Hurley – drums

== Production ==
- Mike Patton – record producer
- Jon St. James – recording engineer
- Tom Trapp – recording engineer
