= 3-Way Tie (For Last) =

Studio album by Minutemen
- Released: December 1985
- Recorded: August–September 1985
- Genre: Punk rock
- Length: 36:11
- Label: SST (058)
- Producer: Mike Watt, D. Boon, Ethan James

Minutemen chronology
Project: Mersh (1985)	3-Way Tie (For Last) (1985)	Minuteflag (1986)

3-Way Tie (For Last) is the fourth and final studio album by American punk band Minutemen, released in 1985 by SST Records. It features covers of songs by the Urinals, Meat Puppets, Blue Öyster Cult, Creedence Clearwater Revival, and Roky Erickson. The last song, a cover of Erickson's "Bermuda", was sung over the phone by Mike Watt.

The album was released very shortly before the death of D. Boon, who also painted the cover. Watt collaborated with Black Flag bassist Kira Roessler on four tracks ("Political Nightmare", "No One", "Stories", and "What Is It?"). At around the time that the album was recorded, Watt and Roessler formed Dos.

The album included ballots for listeners to vote on the track list for what would become Ballot Result.

== Reception ==
Professional ratings
Review scores
Source	Rating
AllMusic	4.5/5 stars
Alternative Rock	6/10
The Boston Phoenix	4/4 stars
Creem	A
The Great Rock Discography	6/10
The Rolling Stone Album Guide	3.5/5 stars

Byron Coley at Spin said, "The four lyrics here that were written by Boon (most of the others are by former Black Flag bassist Kira Roessler) deal in express terms with topics such as Vietnam, Nicaragua, and 'the men who die for glory'. As purist anti-military-industrialist rant they are as forthright in intent as Phil Ochs's songs ever were. And if they aren't quite as archly funny, well, hell, they still rock like a fuckin’ schooner."

== Track listing ==
Side D.

1. "Price of Paradise" (D. Boon) – 3:38
2. "Lost" (Curt Kirkwood) – 2:33
3. "The Big Stick" (Boon) – 2:34
4. "Political Nightmare" (Kira Roessler, Mike Watt) – 3:56
5. "Courage" (Boon) – 2:35
6. "Have You Ever Seen the Rain?" (John Fogerty) – 2:30

Side Mike

1. "The Red and the Black" (Eric Bloom, Albert Bouchard, Sandy Pearlman) – 4:09
2. "Spoken Word Piece" (Watt) – 1:07
3. "No One" (Roessler, Watt) – 3:29
4. "Stories" (Roessler, Watt) – 1:36
5. "What Is It?" (Roessler, Watt) – 1:51
6. "Ack Ack Ack" (Johansen, Jones, Talley) – 0:27
7. "Just Another Soldier" (Boon) – 1:58
8. "Situations at Hand" (Watt) – 1:23
9. "Hittin' the Bong" (Watt) – 0:41
10. "Bermuda" (Roky Erickson) – 1:41

== Personnel ==
Minutemen

- D. Boon – electric guitar, acoustic guitar, vocals, piano
- Mike Watt – bass, vocals, acoustic guitar, electric guitar
- George Hurley – drums

with:

- Joe Baiza – guitar ("Situations at Hand")
- Ethan James – Linn drum ("What Is It?"), Vietnam War battlefield tape ("Spoken Word Piece")

== Charts ==
Chart (1986)	Peak position
UK Indie Chart	7
