= Urinals (band) =

American punk-rock band

- Also known as: 100 Flowers; Chairs of Perception
- Origin: Los Angeles, California
- Genres: Punk rock
- Years active: 1978–1983, 1996–present
- Labels: Happy Squid Records, Amphetamine Reptile
- Members: Kevin Barrett; Rob Roberge; John Talley-Jones
- Past members: Rod Barker; Delia Frankel; Kjehl Johansen; Steve Willard
- Website: https://theurinals.com/

The Urinals are an American punk rock band from Southern California, United States. Known for their minimalist approach to songwriting and recording — their lyrics have been called "punk haiku" — the band influenced other punk rockers of the 1970s and 1980s including Minutemen. They have also been known as 100 Flowers and Chairs of Perception.

== History ==
Founded in 1978 by John Talley-Jones, Kjehl Johansen, and Kevin Barrett, the band's first performance was a parody of punk rock performed for a talent show at their UCLA dorm. Though none of the group's members could play their instruments well, they continued to perform in on-campus venues. Their songs were usually short, seldom utilizing more than two chords.

The band’s first off-campus show was at Raul’s in Austin, Texas. Returning to L.A., they appeared with such groups as The Go-Go's and Black Flag. A roughly-recorded, four-song EP produced by Vitus Matare (of L.A.'s The Last and later Trotsky Icepick) followed. After developing a somewhat more sophisticated sound, the band changed its name to 100 Flowers (inspired by Chairman Mao Zedong's famous quote), but disbanded in 1983.

In 1996, the band reformed as the Urinals, releasing a CD of new material in 2003. They later took the name Chairs of Perception (a reference to Aldous Huxley's The Doors of Perception) before again becoming the Urinals in 2008.

== Discography ==
- The Urinals (7-inch EP, 1978, Happy Squid Records)
- Another EP (7-inch EP, 1979, Happy Squid Records)
- "Sex"/"Go Away Girl" (7-inch EP, 1980, Happy Squid Records)
- Negative Capability...Check It Out! (CD, 1996, Amphetamine Reptile Records, 2004, Warning Label Records, LP, 2013, In The Red)
- What Is Real and What Is Not (CD, 2003, Warning Label)
- Next Year At Marienbad (CD/LP, 2015, Happy Squid Records)

As 100 Flowers:

- Presence of Mind (7-inch EP, 1982, Happy Squid)
- 100 Flowers (LP, 1983, Happy Squid)
- Drawing Fire (EP, 1984, Happy Squid)
- 100 Years of Pulchritude (CD, 1990, Rhino Records)

=== Compilation appearances ===
- The Happy Squid Sampler (1980, Happy Squid)
  - Includes "U"
- Life is Ugly So Why Not Kill Yourself (1982, New Underground Records)
  - Includes "She's a Drone"
- Human Music (1988, Homestead)
  - Includes "I'm Like You"
- Warfrat Tales (Unabridged) (2005, Avebury Records)
  - Includes "I'm Like You" and "Scholastic Aptitude"

As 100 Flowers:

- Keats Rides A Harley (1981, Happy Squid, 2005, Warning Label Records)
  - Includes "Salmonella"
- Hell Comes To Your House (1981, Bemisbrain)
  - Includes "Reject Yourself"
- Life is Ugly So Why Not Kill Yourself (1982, New Underground Records)
  - Includes "Sensible Virgins"
- Warfrat Tales (1983, Warfrat Grammophon; 2005, Avebury Records)
  - Includes "100 Flowers" and "From the Fire"
- The Radio Tokyo Tapes (1983, Ear Movie)
  - Includes "The Long Arm of the Social Sciences"

=== Cover versions ===
Minutemen covered "Ack Ack Ack Ack" (calling it "Ack Ack Ack") on the albums The Politics of Time and 3-Way Tie (For Last). A video of the song, directed by Talley-Jones, would be Minutemen's last video due to the death of D. Boon.

No Age covered "Male Masturbation" on their EP Eraser.

Mika Miko covered "Sex" on their LP We Be Xuxa.

Yo La Tengo has covered "Black Hole" (on their Little Honda EP) and "Surfin' with the Shah". "Black Hole" was also covered by the Leaving Trains, Angry Angles, Women, Gun Club, and Grass Widow.

"I'm a Bug" was covered by Halo of Flies, Lili Z. (on her Let's Go 7-inch), The Meatmen (on their LP Cover the Earth), Ceremony (on their "Hysteria" 7-inch single), Sex Cult (on their Plain Jane 7-inch) and Metz.

"Hologram" was covered by Digital Leather (on their LP Sorcerer) and Human Eye (on their Dinosaur Bones 7-inch).

Other bands to cover Urinals songs include Butthole Surfers, The Dishes, The Reds, Kings of Leon, Mike Watt, and Eleventh Dream Day.
