= Spot (producer) =

American record producer (1951–2023)

- Spot on roller skates with Easy Reader in 1979

Background information
- Born: Glenn Michael Lockett; July 1, 1951; Los Angeles, California, U.S.
- Died: March 4, 2023 (aged 71) Sheboygan, Wisconsin, U.S.
- Genres: Hardcore punk; punk rock; post-hardcore
- Occupation: Record producer
- Years active: 1977–2022
- Labels: SST
- Formerly of: Panic
- Website: spotinator.com (archived copy)

Glenn Michael Lockett (July 1, 1951 – March 4, 2023), better known as Spot, was an American record producer best known for being the house producer and engineer for the influential independent punk record label SST Records. He styled his name SPʘT, using all capital letters and adding a dot inside the O.

== Early life ==
Glenn Michael Lockett was born in the Los Angeles area to a Jewish mother (maiden name Katz) and an African-American father on July 1, 1951. With his older sister Cynthia, he was raised in upper-middle-class Hollywood. Lockett's father Claybourne, known as Buddy to his soldier friends, had been a fighter pilot with the 100th Fighter Squadron in World War II, an all-Black formation that was part of the Tuskegee Airmen. Lockett moved from Hollywood to Hermosa Beach in the mid-1970s, where he met Greg Ginn while working at a vegetarian restaurant called Garden of Eden. Lockett also freelanced for Easy Reader, authoring record reviews under the name Spot.

Befriending Ginn, Spot was briefly bassist for Panic, the band which would soon become Black Flag.

== Career ==
Spot recorded, mixed, produced or co-produced most of SST's pivotal acts between 1979 and 1986. He is credited on albums by such notable bands as Black Flag, Minutemen, Meat Puppets, Hüsker Dü, Saint Vitus, Misfits, and Descendents. After leaving SST in 1986, Spot moved to Austin, Texas.

Spot was an accomplished photographer and published a book of his work titled Sounds of Two Eyes Opening. In 2018, a gallery showing of his photographs was mounted at Pacific Coast Gallery in Hermosa Beach.

== Production and engineering discography ==
- Black Flag - Jealous Again EP (August 1980)
- Descendents - Fat EP (1981)
- Black Flag - Six Pack EP (June 1981)
- Minutemen - The Punch Line EP (November 1981)
- Black Flag - Damaged (December 1981)
- Saccharine Trust - Paganicons (December 1981)
- Big Boys - Fun, Fun, Fun (July 1982)
- Descendents - Milo Goes to College (September 1982)
- Minutemen - Bean-Spill EP (1982)
- Meat Puppets - Meat Puppets (1982)
- Hüsker Dü - Everything Falls Apart (January 1983)
- Minutemen - What Makes a Man Start Fires? (January 1983)
- Big Boys - Lullabies Help The Brain Grow (July 1983)
- Hüsker Dü - Metal Circus (October 1983)
- Minutemen - Buzz or Howl Under the Influence of Heat EP (November 1983)
- Misfits - Earth A.D./Wolfs Blood (December 1983)
- Saint Vitus - Saint Vitus (1984)
- Black Flag - My War (March 1984)
- Meat Puppets - Meat Puppets II (April 1984)
- Hüsker Dü - Zen Arcade (July 1984)
- Black Flag - Family Man (September 1984)
- Black Flag - Slip It In (December 1984)
- Saccharine Trust - Surviving You, Always (1984)
- Hüsker Dü - New Day Rising (January 1985)
- Meat Puppets - Up on the Sun (March 1985)
- Saint Vitus - Hallow's Victim (August 1985)
- Saint Vitus - The Walking Dead EP (October 1985)
- The Crucifucks - The Crucifucks (1985)

== Death ==
Spot died on March 4, 2023, at Morningside Healthcare in Sheboygan, Wisconsin, where he was recovering from a stroke he had suffered three months earlier. He had been suffering from fibrosis since late 2021 and was awaiting a lung transplant prior to his stroke.
