= Martin Tamburovich =

- Born: June 6, 1958
- Died: December 2, 2003 (aged 45)
- Instrument(s): Vocals, saxophone

Martin Tamburovich (June 6, 1958 – December 2, 2003) was the co-founder of New Alliance Records and vocalist for the short-lived punk/new wave band The Reactionaries. Tamburovich, along with his San Pedro High School classmates D. Boon, Mike Watt, and George Hurley, formed the band in 1978; they disbanded a year later. Boon and Watt then formed Minutemen, and Hurley joined them soon after, but Tamburovich would continue to collaborate with his former band members. Since then, he played with such bands as The Slivers and later The Plebs. He resided near San Francisco and still kept in touch with the surviving members of The Reactionaries.

On December 2, 2003, Tamburovich died of a bacterial infection.

== Discography ==
=== With The Reactionaries ===
- Live recording from George Hurley's shed, January 1979
