= Minutemen (band) =

American punk rock band

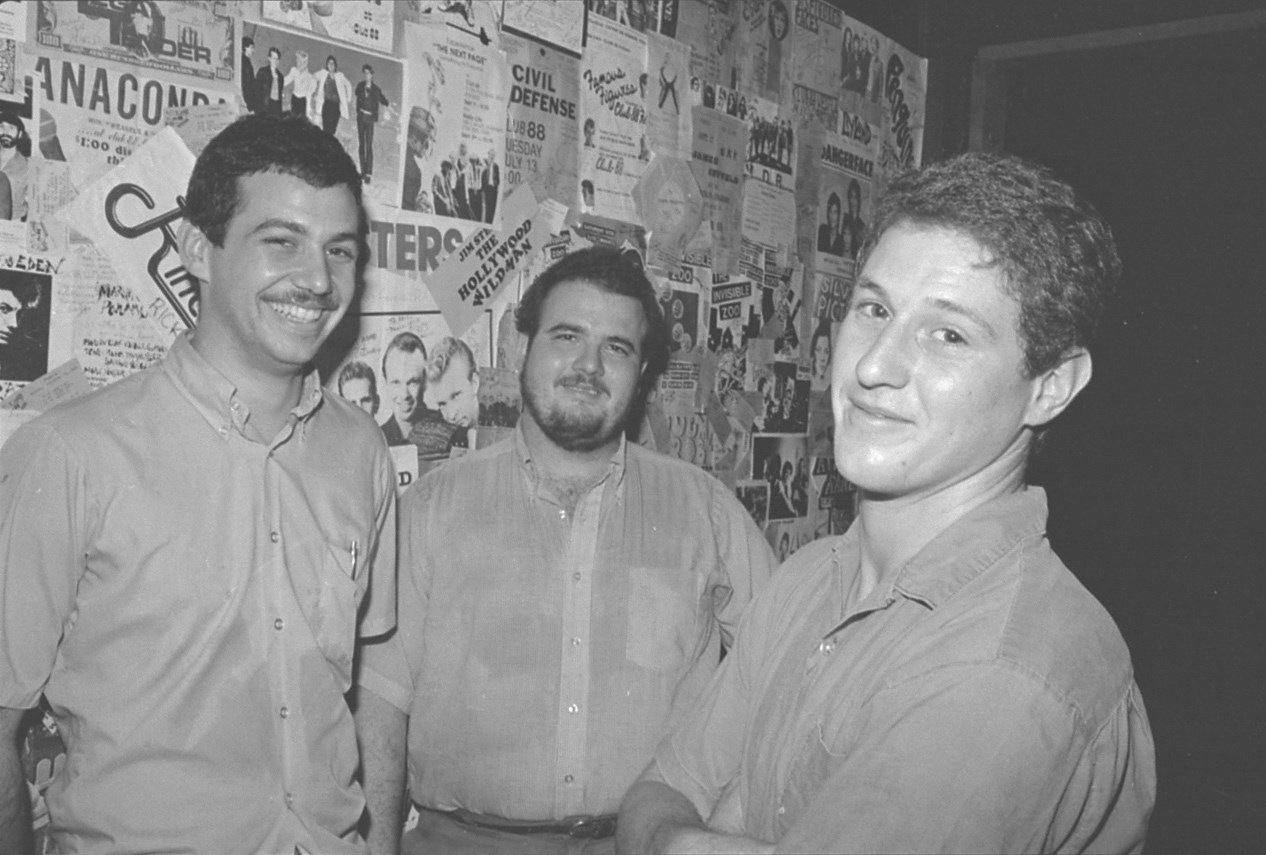
- Minutemen in 1982; from left to right: Mike Watt, D. Boon and George Hurley

Background information
- Origin: San Pedro, California, U.S.
- Genres: Hardcore punk; art punk; punk rock; alternative rock; avant-garde
- Works: Discography
- Years active: 1980–1985
- Labels: SST; New Alliance; Enigma
- Spinoffs: Dos; Firehose; Mike Watt and the Secondmen; Unknown Instructors
- Spinoff of: The Reactionaries
- Past members: D. Boon; Mike Watt; George Hurley; Frank Tonche

Minutemen were an American punk rock band formed in San Pedro, California, in 1980. Composed of guitarist/vocalist D. Boon, bassist/vocalist Mike Watt, and drummer George Hurley, Minutemen recorded four albums and eight EPs before Boon's death in an automobile accident in 1985; the band broke up shortly thereafter. They were noted in the California punk community for a philosophy of "jamming econo"—a sense of thriftiness reflected in their touring and short, tight songs, and for their eclectic style, drawing on hardcore punk, funk, jazz, and other sources.

The group's early recordings (up until their 1985 12" EP Project: Mersh) were recorded as "econo" (Pedro slang for inexpensive, short for "economical") as possible—the group would book studio time after midnight at cut rates, tech their own shows, practice the songs before going into the studio, record on less-expensive used tape, and record the songs in the order they intended to have them on the record rather than waste time editing the master tape during the sequencing phase. In fact, contrary to standard practice even in indie rock, Minutemen sometimes saw records as a way to promote their tours, not the other way around. Minutemen toured frequently, but usually for only a few weeks at a time—they all held down day jobs. Their "econo" practices helped ensure that their tours were generally profitable.

== History ==
=== Formation ===
Minutemen began when D. Boon and Mike Watt met at age 13. Watt was walking through a park in their hometown of San Pedro, California, when Boon, playing a game of "army" with other boys, fell out of a tree right next to him and found that his friends, one named Eskimo, must have ditched him. Both boys shared a passion for music; Boon's mother taught D. to play the guitar and suggested Watt learn to play bass. At first, Watt did not know the difference between bass and standard guitars. The pair eventually started playing music together, mostly covering songs from artists they admired. In the summer of 1973 Watt and Boon formed the Bright Orange Band, with Boon's brother Joe on drums. In 1976 they discovered punk, Boon's mother died, and the Bright Orange Band disbanded shortly thereafter. The next year, the two joined a short-lived band called Starstruck. Following Starstruck's disbandment, Boon and Watt met drummer George Hurley and formed The Reactionaries with vocalist Martin Tamburovich.

After the Reactionaries disbanded, Boon and Watt formed Minutemen in January 1980. Watt has said their name had nothing at all to do with the brevity of their songs; rather, it was derived partly from the fabled minutemen militia of colonial times and partly to lampoon a right-wing reactionary group of the 1960s that went by that name. In the documentary We Jam Econo, Watt also states that the name was a play on "minute" (/maɪˈnjuːt/ my-NEWT), meaning very small. After a month with no drummer, during which Boon and Watt wrote their first songs, the band rehearsed and played a couple of early gigs with local welder Frank Tonche on drums. The group had originally wanted George Hurley to join, but he had joined a hardcore punk band called Hey Taxi! with Michael Ely and Spider Taylor after the Reactionaries disbanded. Tonche quit the group, citing a dislike of the audience the band initially drew, and Hurley took over as drummer in June 1980. (Early rehearsal recordings with Tonche on drums later became the georgeless EP.) Their first live gig was as an opening band for Black Flag.

=== Early days ===
Greg Ginn of Black Flag and SST Records produced Minutemen's first 7" EP, Paranoid Time (1980), which solidified their eclectic style. As with many punk rock bands of the time, the band distributed the EP at their shows and at a few local record stores. Through word of mouth, the EP became a modest hit within the hardcore scene.

They settled on their music style on their first LP, The Punch Line (1981), and toured constantly around America promoting the album. Their third EP and fourth overall release was Bean-Spill (1982). Their second LP, What Makes a Man Start Fires? (1983), gained attention from the alternative and underground press. They continued touring extensively, which included a double bill with Black Flag in Europe. This tour strengthened their place as one of the most well-known acts in the hardcore scene. In November 1983, they released their third LP, Buzz or Howl Under the Influence of Heat.

Minutemen's anti-rockist eclecticism was perhaps best exemplified on the 1984 double album, Double Nickels on the Dime. Though still somewhat obscure to mainstream audiences, Double Nickels has been cited as one of the more innovative and enduring albums of the 1980s American rock underground. On Double Nickels, they co-wrote some songs with other musicians, notably Henry Rollins, Chuck Dukowski, and Joe Baiza. In 1985, they released their most commercial-sounding recording, Project: Mersh. Though the album sounded more mainstream, it sold poorly compared to Double Nickels due largely to the negative reaction to such a commercial album from within the underground community. They continued touring, and by the time of their final album, 3-Way Tie (For Last), they decided to take a small break. They played their last tour with R.E.M. Their final concert was in Charlotte, North Carolina on December 13, 1985.

=== Death of D. Boon ===
On December 22, 1985, Boon was killed in a van accident, putting an end to Minutemen. Watt fell into a deep depression after his friend's death, but was convinced to continue performing by Sonic Youth. In fact, the Ciccone Youth project was conceived in an effort to get Watt making music again.

Boon's death put an end to the band's plans to record a half studio/half live triple album with the working title 3 Dudes, 6 Sides, Half Studio, Half Live. The live tracks were to be based on the ballots that they handed out and as a way to counteract bootlegging. A year later, however, Watt and Hurley compiled various live recordings, based on the ballots, which were released as Ballot Result in 1985.

In addition, Richard Meltzer had sent Watt lyrics for ten songs for an album on which he was going to collaborate. This project, eventually titled Spielgusher, was completed (by Watt, Meltzer, Yuko Araki, and Hirotaka Shimizu) and released in January 2012 on clenchedwrench.

=== Post-breakup activities ===
Following Boon's death, Watt and Hurley originally intended to quit music altogether, but encouraged by Minutemen fan Ed Crawford, they formed Firehose in 1986 and have both started solo projects since Minutemen disbanded.

Watt has created four acclaimed solo albums, recorded four with now-former-wife Kira Roessler as the duo dos, recorded three others as part of the punk jazz jam band Banyan with Stephen Perkins (Jane's Addiction), Nels Cline (Wilco), and Money Mark Nishita (Beastie Boys), contributed on "Providence" off Sonic Youth's album Daydream Nation and "In the Kingdom No. 19" and "Bubblegum" off EVOL, toured briefly as a member of Porno for Pyros in 1996 and J Mascis and the Fog in 2000 and 2001, and became the bassist for The Stooges in 2003. He founded his own label, Clenchedwrench, in 2011, to release many of his own projects, including his fourth solo album Hyphenated-man. George Hurley has produced work with Vida, Mayo Thompson, and Red Crayola, further indulging the free-form and off-the-wall leanings showcased on Double Nickels. Hurley and Watt have also continued to make music together both live and in the studio since Firehose's splitting in 1994, starting with a track, along with Petra Haden and Stephen Perkins, for the NORML benefit album Hempilation II in 1998.

On rare occasions since 2001, and usually in the Los Angeles area (two December 2004 performances in England being a notable exception), George Hurley and Mike Watt, who have remained friends since Firehose's disbanding in 1994, reunite to play a set list of all Minutemen songs as a duet.

They refuse to have a substitute guitarist play late Minutemen guitarist D. Boon's parts; instead the songs are arranged for bass and drums. They insist that they not be billed as Minutemen for these shows or referred to as a Minutemen reunion, as they do not want to cheapen or "vampire" the Minutemen name. Instead, they insist on being billed under their real names and that the advertisements state that they will be "playing Minutemen songs as a duet." They were chosen by Jeff Mangum of Neutral Milk Hotel to perform one of these shows at the All Tomorrow's Parties festival that he curated in March 2012 in Minehead, England.

== Artistry ==
=== Musical style ===
Billboard described the group as "provocative art-punk minimalists". Tyler Golsen of Far Out Magazine called them "a punk band who did everything except play straight-forward punk" and said that they "almost single-handedly broadened the scope of what could be considered 'punk'. That included playing jazz, soft rock, funk, bossa nova, R&B, blues, and especially bare-bones experimental music that couldn’t fit into any specific genre tag."

Nearly all of their early songs had unusual structures and were less than a minute long—even later, when Minutemen's music became slightly more conventional, their songs rarely passed the three-minute mark. Though Minutemen were members of the hardcore punk community and were somewhat influenced by the speed, brevity, and intensity of hardcore punk, they were known for hybridizing punk rock and hardcore with various forms of music (like jazz, funk, acid rock, and R&B), separating them from most hardcore bands of that era. Critic Simon Reynolds compared their "nimble punk-funk" to Gang of Four. In a 1984 Trouser Press article, John Leland wrote, "[t]he Minutemen make anti-fusion music. They use particles of jazz, noise and especially funk to split apart the sluggish nucleus of rock. The songs are necessarily fragmented, but quality musicianship creates an overall unity. The band rearranges fragments so adroitly and thoughtfully that even 30-second songs are fully satisfying compositions."

Through most of their career they ignored standard verse-chorus-verse song structures in favor of experimenting with musical dynamics, rhythm, and noise. Later in their career they blended in more traditional song elements they had initially avoided. They also played cover versions of classic rock songs by bands such as Creedence Clearwater Revival, Steely Dan, and Blue Öyster Cult.

=== Lyrical themes ===
Boon and Watt split songwriting fairly evenly (and Hurley made many contributions as well), though Watt rarely sang and Hurley even less so. Boon's songs were typically more direct and progressively political in nature, while Watt's were often abstract, self-referential "spiels". Lyrics and themes would thus often veer from surreal humor, as in "Bob Dylan Wrote Propaganda Songs" and "One Reporter's Opinion", to the frustrations of blue collar life in California, as in the enduring "This Ain't No Picnic". While many contemporaries rarely displayed a sense of humor, Minutemen were generally more light-hearted and whimsical. One example of this can be found in the title of their album Double Nickels on the Dime, which poked fun at Sammy Hagar's "I Can't Drive 55" by implying that the Minutemen preferred to take risks with their music rather than behind the wheel of a car.

=== Influences ===
Minutemen were influenced heavily by bands such as the Pop Group, Wire, Creedence Clearwater Revival, Pere Ubu, and Richard Hell & The Voidoids. The band's minimalist compositions have their roots in Los Angeles punks the Urinals, who impressed Watt with their one-chord songs. They were also fans of Captain Beefheart, and echoes of his distinctive, disjointed, avant-blues music can be heard in their songs, especially their early output. "Boon's kind of noise was all treble, and punishingly loud. He played very few chords, sticking to scratchy, aggressive picking and a constant weirdo barrage of notes, and essentially skipped distortion entirely. Watt's answer was complex, mashing together skronky funk with thunderous chords and countermelodies. Hurley attacked his toms and lurched from rhythm to rhythm. They were always separate, but always together." "[T]he Minutemen...[compress] the music into brief bonsai songs packed with complex sound and lyrics. Any given Minutemen song is bursting at the seams with riffs and words all arranged in tight, precise patterns. There is a rigid, implosive order, as though the Minutemen are trying to develop a microchip music in which each song is freighted with more and more information in an ever diminishing space."

=== Album artwork ===
Several Minutemen album sleeves and covers, such as the Paranoid Time EP and What Makes a Man Start Fires? LP and the inner gatefold jacket for Double Nickels on the Dime, feature drawings by noted artist Raymond Pettibon, who was at the time associated with the SST label. Other album covers, like on The Punch Line, Project: Mersh, and 3-Way Tie (For Last), featured paintings by Boon.

== Legacy ==
Music journalist Michael Azerrad wrote in the book Our Band Could Be Your Life, "[Minutemen] were paragons of the subversive idea that you didn't have to be a star to be a success. Their hard work and Relentless, uncompromising pursuit of their unique artistic vision have inspired countless bands. [...] In the process, [they] proved that regular Joes could make great art, a concept that reverberated throughout indie rock ever after." He also credited the band for "[helping] to originate the idea that a punk rock band could be worthy of respect."

Many of the band's peers credit Minutemen. Dave Alvin of The Blasters called Minutemen "one of the finest combos to ever step on to a beer soaked stage". Joe Strummer of The Clash listed Minutemen as one of the ultimate punk bands along with Ramones, Television Personalities, and Buzzcocks.

According to Huw Baines of Guitar.com:

Minutemen's legacy is ethical as much as it is musical, for a couple of reasons. On one hand, the idea behind jamming econo remains a foundational tenet of DIY. On the other, no band could hope to sound like Minutemen. You just have to accept that they were a one-off: a bassist who couldn't sit still, a drummer who wouldn't sit still, and a guitarist with a tone designed to slice clean through the front two rows. J. Mascis once said they were the most punishing live band he ever saw.

In the early 2000s, the instrumental portions of the Minutemen song "Corona" was the main theme song of the MTV reality stunt show Jackass.

In 2000, Watt (as administrator of the band's publishing) allowed the automaker Volvo to use the Boon instrumental "Love Dance" in a car ad. Boon's royalties were paid to his father, who was suffering from emphysema. Watt simply refers to the decision as a way for Boon to help his father from beyond the grave.

Watt and Hurley have done occasional gigs since 2001 (mainly in the L.A. area except for two December 2004 shows in England) playing Minutemen songs as a duo with no guitarist. At some of these gigs, Watt would set up one of Boon's old guitars and amps on the side of the stage where Boon used to stand. These performances, at Watt's insistence, are to be billed strictly as "George Hurley and Mike Watt". They are also now involved in an improvisational music group, Unknown Instructors, with members of Saccharine Trust and Pere Ubu.

The group's career is chronicled in the book Our Band Could Be Your Life, a study of 13 important American underground rock groups by veteran music journalist Michael Azerrad. The title is taken from the lyrics to the Double Nickels track "History Lesson – Part II."

The documentary film We Jam Econo charts the band's history through interviews with Watt, Hurley, Henry Rollins, Flea of Red Hot Chili Peppers, and other California punk rock contemporaries. The film premiered at the Warner Grand Theatre in the Minutemen's hometown of San Pedro in February 2005. The film was released on DVD in June 2006. In the spring of 2007 the documentary went into a heavy rotation cycle on various Sundance cable television channels.

In 2003 Watt released his own book on Minutemen, Spiels of a Minuteman, which contains all of Watt's song lyrics from the Minutemen era as well as the tour journal he wrote during Minutemen's only European tour with Black Flag, essays by former SST co-owner Joe Carducci, Sonic Youth's Thurston Moore, Blue Öyster Cult lyricist and longtime Watt hero Richard Meltzer, and illustrations by Raymond Pettibon that had been used in all of Minutemen's album artwork. The book, released by Quebec-based publisher L'Oie de Cravan, is published in English and French. In June 2015, Watt went on WTF with Marc Maron to discuss the legacy of the Minutemen.

=== Covers and tributes ===
Watt has dedicated all of Firehose's releases and his solo albums to the memory of Boon. "Disciples of the 3-Way" on Firehose's final studio album Mr. Machinery Operator is about Minutemen, and "The Boilerman" from Watt's second solo album Contemplating The Engine Room (which parallels the stories of Minutemen, Watt's father, and the novel The Sand Pebbles) is about Boon; Watt had guitarist Nels Cline play one of Boon's old Fender Telecaster guitars on the track.

Sublime (whose lead singer Bradley Nowell also died prematurely) sampled Boon saying "Punk rock changed our lives" on "History Lesson Part II" from Double Nickels as part of their song "Waiting For My Ruca" from 1992's 40 Oz. to Freedom. On the final track from the same album titled "Thanx", all three Minutemen are mentioned. Watt repaid this salute by appearing in Sublime's video for "Wrong Way" in 1996. Sublime also sampled George Hurley's drum intro from "It's Expected I'm Gone" for their "Get Out! (remix)" on their posthumous release Second Hand Smoke, as did San Diego–based indie rockers Pinback on their eponymous debut LP. The Unknown Instructors track "Punk Is Whatever We Make It To Be" from their first album The Way Things Work contains interpolations by vocalist Dan McGuire of several lyrics from Double Nickels on the Dime.

In 1994, Little Brother Records released the Minutemen tribute CD and LP Our Band Could Be Your Life. The CD version included 33 tracks by artists covering Minutemen songs, plus a track with a Boon interview and a live version of the Minutemen song "Badges". The LP version had 23 tracks, including the interview and Minutemen items. Tribute songs have been written by several acts, including The Ergs!, The Fad, and Uncle Tupelo. Bargain Music, Hot Club de Paris, Karate, Brutal Truth, Jeff Mangum, Yonder Mountain String Band and Red Hot Chili Peppers have all covered Minutemen songs.

In 2015, the band EL VY, an American indie rock collaboration between Matt Berninger (lead vocalist of the National) and Brent Knopf (founding member of Ramona Falls and Menomena), inspired by both Grease and We Jam Econo, imagined "as a sort of punk rock musical following the adventures of Didi and Michael—named after the Minutemen's D. Boon and Mike Watt. Their song, "It's a Game", is about the band.

== Discography ==
=== Studio albums ===
- The Punch Line (1981)
- What Makes a Man Start Fires? (1983)
- Double Nickels on the Dime (1984)
- 3-Way Tie (For Last) (1985)

=== Extended plays ===
- Paranoid Time (1980)
- Joy (1981)
- Bean-Spill (1982)
- Buzz or Howl Under the Influence of Heat (1983)
- Tour-Spiel (1984)
- Project: Mersh (1985)
- Minuteflag (1986)
- Georgeless (1993)
- Minutemen/Saccharine Trust Split (2011)

=== Compilations ===
- The Politics of Time (1984)
- My First Bells (1985)
- Ballot Result (1987)
- Post-Mersh, Vol. 1 (1987)
- Post-Mersh, Vol. 2 (1987)
- Post-Mersh, Vol. 3 (1989)
- Introducing the Minutemen (1998)

== See also ==
- We Jam Econo – full-length Minutemen documentary from 2005
