= D. Boon =

American guitarist and singer (1958–1985)

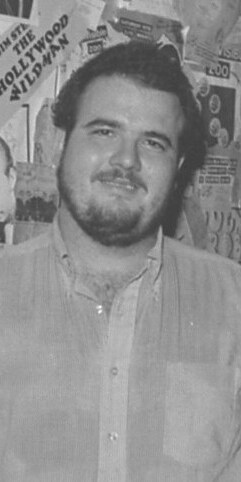
- Boon in 1982

Background information
- Born: Dennes Dale Boon; April 1, 1958; San Pedro, California, U.S.
- Died: December 22, 1985 (aged 27) Centennial, Arizona, U.S.
- Genres: Punk rock, alternative rock
- Occupations: Musician
- Instruments: Guitar, vocals
- Years active: 1978–1985
- Labels: SST, New Alliance
- Formerly of: Minutemen, The Reactionaries, The Nig-Heist

Dennes Dale Boon (April 1, 1958 – December 22, 1985), commonly known as D. Boon, was an American musician, best known as the guitarist, singer and songwriter of the punk rock trio Minutemen (formed by previous members of the Reactionaries).

He formed Minutemen in 1980 with bassist Mike Watt and drummer George Hurley. Minutemen were known for their politically-charged lyrics and energetic, fast-paced music, and they released several influential records during their career.

Despite his early death in an auto accident, Boon's contributions to punk rock and independent music have been widely recognized. He is remembered as an important figure in the history of these genres and as one of the most technically accomplished American punk guitarists of his era.

== Biography ==
=== Early years ===
Dennes Dale Boon was born in San Pedro, California, on April 1, 1958. His father, a navy veteran, worked installing radios in Buick cars, and the Boons lived in former World War II barracks that had been converted into public housing.

According to childhood friend and future bandmate Mike Watt, Boon grew up listening to Buck Owens and Creedence Clearwater Revival, the only rock band he knew. Watt introduced Boon to Blue Öyster Cult and the Who. Urged by Boon's mother, Boon and Watt began to learn to play instruments.

"Our first guitars were pawnshop", Watt says. "I think D. Boon had a Melody Plus. His cost $15 and mine was $13. Mine was a Teisco."

Boon's mother taught D. to play the guitar and suggested Watt learn to play bass. They learned to play by copying songs from their favorite bands' records. Boon took a few lessons from local teacher Roy Mendez Lopez who taught him rock as well as flamenco and classical.

As a teenager, Boon began painting and signed his works "D. Boon", partly because "D" was his slang for cannabis, partly after Daniel Boone, but mostly because it was similar to E. Bloom, Blue Öyster Cult's vocalist and guitarist.

=== The Reactionaries ===
Boon formed his first band, the Reactionaries, with Watt in 1978. The band's members were lead vocalist Martin Tamburovich, Boon on guitar, bassist Watt, and drummer George Hurley. The Reactionaries existed for most of 1978 and 1979, practicing regularly but rarely if ever performing live.

Boon and Watt broke the band up feeling that the traditional frontman-style band was "bourgeois".

=== Minutemen ===
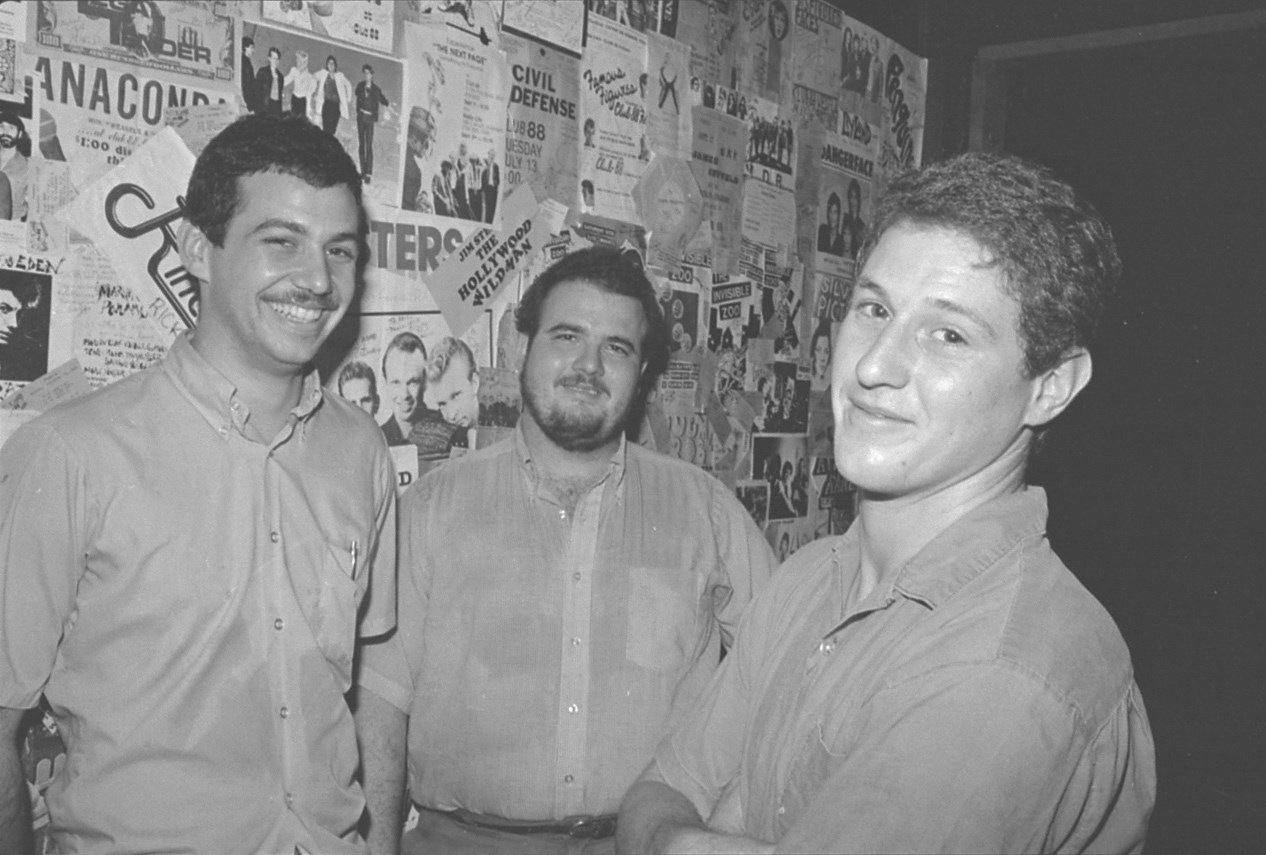
Minutemen in 1982 (D. Boon in the middle)

Boon formed Minutemen in January 1980 with former Reactionaries Mike Watt on bass and Frank Tonche on drums. Tonche was soon replaced by former Reactionaries drummer George Hurley. Their best-known album is Double Nickels on the Dime, an album that in 2012 was listed at number 77 by Slant Magazine on their list of "Best Albums of the 1980s". Their first live gig was as an opening band for Black Flag, and released records for labels such as SST Records, New Alliance Records, and Enigma Records.

The band would come to an abrupt end with Boon's death, but have left a lasting impact on the punk scene. They were described by Billboard magazine as "provocative art-punk minimalists", having been inspired by punk and rock bands such as Wire, Gang of Four, the Pop Group, Richard Hell and the Voidoids, and Urinals.

=== Death ===
Minutemen continued until Boon was killed in a single-vehicle accident on December 22, 1985, at approximately 4:40 a.m. in the Arizona desert on a desolate stretch of Interstate 10, just west of the small town of Centennial. (Note: The location of the accident is also described as being east of Quartzsite, Arizona.) Because he had been sick with fever, Boon was lying down in the rear of the vehicle, a 1979 Dodge van, without a seatbelt, while his longtime girlfriend Linda Kite drove. The van's rear axle broke and the van ran off the road. Boon was thrown out the back door of the van and died instantly from a broken neck. He was 27 years old.

Boon's death caused the band to immediately dissolve, though Watt and Hurley would form the band Firehose soon after. The live album Ballot Result was released in 1987, two years after Boon's death.

== Musical style ==
Boon's guitar sound is very distinctive: he rarely used distortion and frequently set the equalization on his amplifier so that only the treble frequencies were heard – the bass and midrange frequencies would be turned off completely. His favorite electric guitar was the Fender Telecaster (he owned at least three), though he also used a Stratocaster or Gibson ES-125 or Gibson Melody Maker at various points, and his preferred amplifier was a Fender Twin Reverb.

Boon's style had a heavy influence from funk and blues, which was very different from other hardcore punk bands in the 1980s. Boon's solos were often idiosyncratic and used odd rhythms or scales that were influenced by jazz or his early study of classical guitar.

== Artwork ==
Boon is responsible for the writing and composition of Minutemen's most anthemic songs, in contrast to Watt's more abstract or stream of consciousness lyrics. Songs composed by Boon include "This Ain't No Picnic", "Corona", "The Price of Paradise", and "Courage". A lifelong visual artist, Boon also created drawings or paintings for the Minutemen releases Joy, The Punch Line, The Politics of Time, Project: Mersh and 3-Way Tie (For Last).

== Legacy ==
Since the first Firehose album, Mike Watt has dedicated every record he has worked on – be it Firehose, solo, or otherwise – to D. Boon's memory. A song on Watt's semi-autobiographical 1997 album Contemplating the Engine Room, "The Boilerman", is about D. Boon; on the recording itself, guitarist Nels Cline plays one of Boon's last Telecaster guitars, which Watt is in possession of. Watt also mentions his fallen friend in Firehose's "Disciples of the 3-Way" (Mr. Machinery Operator) and his own "Burstedman" (The Secondman's Middle Stand).

Boon has been paid tribute by American alternative band Stigmata-A-Go-Go with the song "D. Boon", from its 1994 album It's All True, Uncle Tupelo with a different song "D. Boon" from its 1991 album Still Feel Gone, and Centro-matic's song "D.Boon-Free (A Ninth Grade Crime)" off The Static vs. The Strings Vol. 1. His story is also told in the documentary We Jam Econo.

In 2003, former D. Boon roommate Richard Derrick released the CD D. Boon and Friends, a collection of jam session tapes he recorded with D. Boon, and rare Boon solo performances, as the first release on his Box-O-Plenty Records label. Mike Watt authorized the release and provided technical assistance and liner notes.

Boon is #89 on Rolling Stone's list of the 100 greatest guitarists of all time: David Fricke's Picks.

In his review of the band's last album, music critic Robert Christgau described the death of Boon as "a rock death that for wasted potential has Lennon and Hendrix for company", adding that "after seven fairly amazing years he was just getting started. Shit, shit, shit."

== Discography ==
- D. Boon and Friends
