= George Hurley =

American drummer

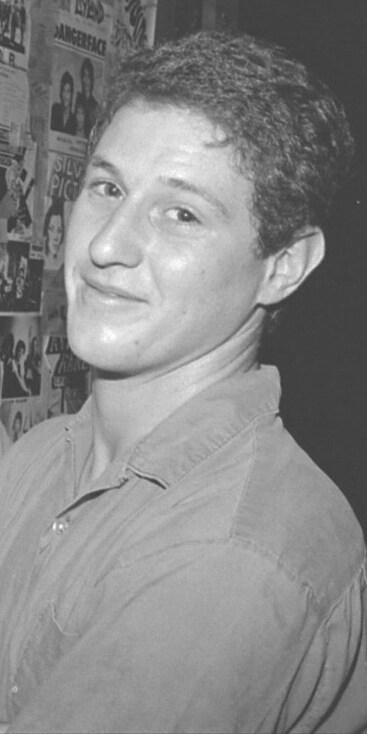
- Hurley in 1982

Background information
- Born: George Michael Hurley; September 4, 1958 (age 68); Brockton, Massachusetts, U.S.
- Genres: Punk rock, alternative rock, hardcore punk, post-punk, noise rock, experimental rock, improvised music
- Occupation: Drummer
- Years active: 1979–present

George Hurley (born September 4, 1958) is an American drummer best known as a member of the rock bands Minutemen and fIREHOSE.

== Career ==
=== Early years ===
Originally from the East Coast, Hurley and his family moved to San Pedro, California, when he was six years old. Hurley was a surfer before devoting himself to music.

A self-taught musician, Hurley created his own drumsticks out of Plexiglas and wood at the Boys Club in his youth. He got his first drumkit when he was nineteen after trading a motorcycle for it.

Although he is known as a punk drummer, Hurley's musical influences are primarily jazz-based.

"I’d go see Max Roach,” he recalls, “or some other great jazz drummer, and they’d have these kits that they pulled out of the trunk of their cars, three-piece or four-pieces, and they were doing things that I couldn’t imagine. They were like magicians!"

Even though he went to the same high school as D. Boon and Mike Watt he did not meet them until around 1978. That same year, Hurley formed the Reactionaries with Boon, Watt, and Martin Tamburovich. Watt asked Hurley to join repeatedly but Hurley was reticent because they traveled in different circles and Watt was deemed "a geek". Eventually, Hurley threw caution to the wind and joined up with Watt. After the Reactionaries split, George joined a Hollywood new wave band called Hey Taxi!. In 1980, Hey Taxi! disbanded at the same time the Minutemen's then drummer Frank Tonche left the band. Hurley reunited with his two former Reactionaries bandmates in Minutemen.

=== Minutemen ===
The Minutemen played their first gig with Los Angeles band Black Flag and after their set were asked by Black Flag guitarist and SST Records founder Greg Ginn to record an album for his label. The Paranoid Time EP was followed by full-length albums The Punch Line and What Makes a Man Start Fires? and two more EPs, Joy and Bean-Spill, before recording their magnum opus, Double Nickels on the Dime, an album which appears on many music critics' lists of the all-time best rock albums, including Rolling Stone's 500 Greatest Albums of All Time. Slant Magazine listed the album at No. 77 on its list of "Best Albums of the 1980s".

In 1985, D. Boon died in a van accident following the release of their final full-length album, 3-Way Tie (For Last), at which point Minutemen disbanded.

=== fIREHOSE ===
Watt and Hurley formed fIREHOSE in 1986, alongside newcomer Ed Crawford on guitar and lead vocals. They recorded three albums with SST Records, then joined Columbia Records for two albums and an EP. The band dissolved in 1994 citing creative stagnation, and reformed in 2012 for an appearance at the Coachella Valley Music and Arts Festival and a short tour.

=== Later work ===
Hurley has played with the Red Krayola and Tom Watson from Slovenly. He also plays with his surviving Minutemen cohort Mike Watt on occasion, usually performing a set of Minutemen songs without a third person substituting for the late Minutemen leader D. Boon under the name George Hurley and Mike Watt. In addition, he occasionally performs with improvisational group Unknown Instructors with Watt and members of Saccharine Trust and Pere Ubu. Their first album, The Way Things Work, was released in late September 2005 by Smog Veil Records. In October 2005, they returned to the studio to record their second album, this time with Pere Ubu's David Thomas as an added participant.

Hurley has formed a drum/bass duo with Constant Llama member Joe Dean called the Wrinkling Brothers.

== Personal life ==
Hurley has been married since 1997 and has a son, Garrett, who was born in July 2002.

=== Hairstyle ===
Hurley is known for his distinctive hairstyle that he sported in his later Minutemen and Firehose days, a protruding clump of hair that he nicknamed "The Unit". Hurley explained in the 2005 Minutemen documentary We Jam Econo that since his limbs were all busy when he played drums, he grew "The Unit" so that his head movements were more noticeable on stage.

== See also ==
- We Jam Econo – full-length Minutemen documentary (2005)
