= The Way Things Work (album) =

Studio album by Unknown Instructors
- Released: September 13, 2005 (mail order), September 20, 2005 (street)
- Recorded: August 23, 2003
- Genre: Experimental rock, improvised music
- Length: 54:09
- Label: Smog Veil
- Producer: Joe Baiza, Dan McGuire

Unknown Instructors chronology
The Way Things Work (2005)	The Master's Voice (2006)

The Way Things Work is the debut album by American improvisational band Unknown Instructors, featuring Mike Watt (Minutemen, fIREHOSE, The Stooges, Dos, Banyan), George Hurley (Minutemen, Firehose, Red Krayola), Joe Baiza (Saccharine Trust, Universal Congress Of), Jack Brewer (Saccharine Trust), and poet Dan McGuire.

The album was created and recorded on the spot in one day in 2003 at Karma Studio in San Pedro, California. Watt would record his third solo album The Secondman's Middle Stand in the same studio five months later. McGuire credited the Saccharine Trust album Worldbroken as an influence saying he wanted to use it "as a template for that first album." The album has been compared to Captain Beefheart's classic Trout Mask Replica.

One notable track, "Punk (is Whatever We Made It to Be)" features interpolated lyrics from several songs from Minutemen's album Double Nickels on the Dime.

== Track listing ==
1. "I'll Show You Everything"
2. "Where You Find It"
3. "Punk (is Whatever We Made It to Be)"
4. "Something Eternal"
5. "Starving Artists"
6. "The New Bluesman"
7. "Punch Out *The Layoff* Gratuity"
8. "Walk with Me"
9. "Creature Comforts"
10. "An Evening In Hell"
11. "Scansion"
12. "Adam's Apple"
13. "Turf Songs"
14. "I Think"
15. "Lost and Found"

All songs written and composed by Joe Baiza, George Hurley, Dan McGuire and Mike Watt, ©2005 Prestidigitation Music (BMI), except "Punk (is Whatever We Made It to Be)", composed by Joe Baiza, D. Boon, Jack Brewer, Chuck Dukowski, George Hurley and Mike Watt, © 1984 tHUNDERsPIELS (BMI).

== Personnel ==
- Mike Watt – bass
- George Hurley – drums
- Joe Baiza – guitar; vocals on tr. 6
- Dan McGuire – vocals (except where noted); saxophone on 6
- Jack Brewer – vocals on tr. 2, 6, 11, 14; maracas and tarine on 6
