= Devin Sarno =

American experimental musician

Background information
- Born: Devin Christopher Sarno; Glendale, California, U.S.
- Genres: Experimental music Ambient music
- Instrument: Bass guitar
- Years active: 1985–present
- Website: Official Website

Devin Sarno (born in Glendale, California in 1966) began CRIB in early 1990 as a solo bass sound project focusing on improvised subsonics. Over the course of a decade (and over a dozen recordings) his music evolved from high volume feedback experimentation to a sonic examination of the meditative properties of low-end drone music. In 2003, the CRIB moniker was retired & Sarno now performs & records under his own name.

Sarno was a founding member of the Los Angeles, CA art-rock band Waldo The Dog Faced Boy and in 1989, along with partner/producer Tom Grimley, he also co-founded the experimental label WIN Records, which was home to artists such as: Petra Haden, Alicia J. Rose, The Centimeters, Upsilon Acrux & many more. As a bassist, Sarno has collaborated/recorded with a range of diverse acts including: Nels Cline, Thurston Moore, Vincent Gallo, Joe Baiza, Mike Watt, Jack Brewer, Z'EV, Petra Haden, that dog., Abby Travis, Danny Frankel, G.E. Stinson, Jeff Gauthier, Tom Surgal, Upsilon Acrux, Carla Bozulich, Brandon LaBelle, Jason Kahn, The Watson Twins, Jessica Catron, Celer, Tim Biskup, Randy Randall (of No Age), Angela Frances Wilson and others.

Sarno's lyrics were used by the band Saccharine Trust for the song "Devin's Poem" which appeared on their 1989 SST Records album Past Lives. In addition, his lyrics were featured on the track "Tight Heat" by Universal Congress Of from their 1991 Enemy Records release The Sad and Tragic Demise of Big Fine Hot Salty Black Wind. Sarno was a featured "noise" bassist on the track "To Keep Me" from band That Dog on their 1995 DGC Records album Totally Crushed Out!. He has also contributed guest bass work on releases from Slug and Upsilon Acrux.

Sarno's music was featured on the CBS network program The Courier (micro-series) which aired nationally in January 2006 and found itself broadcast over New York City's Times Square JumboTron. Film composing works have included the score for "Postmortem Bliss" by noted director Floria Sigismondi as well as "Eve" and "DadaDum" for Canadian-based director/fine artist Britt Randle. "DadaDum" screened at the 2007 Toronto International Film Festival as a Best Short Film nominee.

From January 2011 - December 2014, Sarno curated the independent netlabel Absence of Wax.

Since 1989, Sarno has also worked as a record label Music Video commissioner and Executive Producer at: Virgin Records, Sony Music, and Warner Records. He executive produced the music video for Green Day "Boulevard of Broken Dreams" which won 2005's top MTV Video Music Award for Video of the Year. In 2007, Sarno received the Kratz Award for Creative Excellence from The Music Video Producer's Association, an award which recognizes superb talent and exceptional accomplishments in music video production. In 2008, he executive produced the long form documentary project 10 Days Out: Blues from the Backroads which was nominated for Grammy Award for Best Music Film at the 50th Annual Grammy Awards. Sarno came away with a Bronze at the 2016 Clio Awards and Platinum at the 2017 Hermès Creative Awards for his work on the documentary project "iRise" for The Coca-Cola Company and artist Andra Day. In 2019, he was nominated as Producer at the 62nd Annual Grammy Awards for the Gary Clark Jr. music video "This Land."

Recently, Devin Sarno has photographed the band My Chemical Romance for their current 2022 tour, with one of his photos being displayed as a promotional photo at a few of the venues.

== Selected discography ==
- 2023 Devin Sarno "Misshapen Heart" (Perceived Sound)
- 2021 Devin Sarno "Evocation" (Self Released)
- 2020 Devin Sarno "The Liquid Real" (Self Released)
- 2019 Devin Sarno "Archive" (Self Released)
- 2018 Devin Sarno "Visitor" (Self Released)
- 2016 Devin Sarno "Fall" (Self Released)
- 2015 Lone Echo "Noize" (Self Released)
- 2011 Devin Sarno "First-impression" for 1.1.11 (Absence of Wax)
- 2010 Devin Sarno "Three Twenty Eight Twenty Ten" (Banned Production)
- 2007 Devin Sarno "Full dynamics-frequency Spectrum" (Banned Production)
- 2007 Devin Sarno & G.E. Stinson "Heart Cell Memory" (Squirrelgirl)
- 2005 Devin Sarno "Variations" (Banned Production)
- 2004 Nels Cline + Devin Sarno "Buried on Bunker Hill" (Groundfault)
- 2002 CRIB "Remnant" (True Classical CDs)
- 2000 CRIB "Forward Back" (WIN Records)
- 1998 CRIB "She Is Church" (WIN Records)
- 1998 Nels Cline + Devin Sarno "Rise Pumpkin Rise" (Volvolo)
- 1998 Nels Cline + Devin Sarno "Edible Flowers" (WIN Records)
- 1992 Waldo The Dog Faced Boy "Tingle" (WIN Records)
- 1989 Waldo The Dog Faced Boy "Gifts of Finest Wheat" (WIN Records)
- 1987 Waldo The Dog Faced Boy "Wood" (Flux Records)

== Musical Influences ==
- Deep Listening Band
- Arvo Pärt
- William Basinski
- Stars of the Lid
