= The Master's Voice =

Studio album by Unknown Instructors
- Released: March 6, 2007 (mail order); March 20, 2007 (street)
- Recorded: October 13, 2005
- Genre: Experimental rock, improvised music
- Length: 41:18
- Label: Smog Veil
- Producer: Joe Baiza, Dan McGuire, Joe Carducci

Unknown Instructors chronology
The Way Things Work (2005)	The Master's Voice (2007)	Funland (2009)

The Master's Voice is the second album by American improvisational band Unknown Instructors. The core quartet of Mike Watt (The Minutemen, fIREHOSE, The Stooges, Dos, Banyan), George Hurley (The Minutemen, Firehose, Red Krayola), Joe Baiza (Saccharine Trust, Universal Congress Of), and poet/saxophonist Dan McGuire reconvene on the album, with guest vocals on three tracks by David Thomas (Pere Ubu) and on another track by artist Raymond Pettibon. In addition, Watt also contributes a vocal of his own. The album was recorded at Total Access Studio in Redondo Beach, California, the same studio where Black Flag recorded many of their classic mid-'80s album releases and where Watt and Hurley's The Minutemen had recorded Project: Mersh in 1985.

== Recording ==
According to Dan McGuire, the previous album The Ways Things Work was recorded in one day and came off jazzier because of it. With the rhythm section more familiar now, McGuire wanted a harder edged album this time.

== Track listing ==
1. "Swarm"
2. "In Your Town Without You"
3. "At The Center"
4. "This Black Hat Is Rage"
5. "Twing"-Twang
6. "End Of The World"
7. "Tar Baby Sees The Rising Sun"
8. "Machine Language"
9. "Doghouse Riley"
10. "Maggot Sludge"

== Personnel ==
- Mike Watt - bass; vocals on track 2
- George Hurley - drums
- Joe Baiza - guitar
- Dan McGuire - vocals (except where noted); saxophone
- David Thomas - vocals on tracks 4, 7 and 9
- Raymond Pettibon - vocals on track 5
