= The Great One Is Dead =

Studio album by Saccharine Trust
- Released: 2001
- Studio: Hazelwood Studios in Frankfurt, Germany
- Genre: Post-hardcore, jazz fusion
- Label: Hazelwood Records
- Producer: Gordon Friedrich

Saccharine Trust chronology
Past Lives (1989)	The Great One Is Dead (2001)

The Great One Is Dead is Saccharine Trust's third LP, released in 2001 through Hazelwood Records. It was their first studio effort since We Became Snakes fifteen years earlier.

Initially recorded at Hazelwood Studios in Frankfurt, Germany and released by Hazelwood Records, it was re-released as a split release by Recess Records and Water Under the Bridge Records in 2017.

== Track listing ==
1. The Sinister Rain
2. Grotian Phraseology
3. The Sadness Of Apollo
4. Legends Die Behind The Wheel, At Least
5. Neruda's Wave
6. Birthing The Ancestors
7. Antecedent Satisfaction
8. This Is Wilmington
9. Nocturnal Ballets
10. Reggie's Plateau
11. Untitled No.2 (I Gave Another Dimension The Slip)
12. Ordinary Calvinistic
13. Untitled No.1 (The Creative Fluctuation)
14. The Great One Is Dead
15. Water on the Dancefloor
16. Against Faustus
17. Resuscitate The Worm
18. Now That You're Dead

== Personnel ==
Saccharine Trust

- Joe Baiza – guitar, vocals
- Jack Brewer – vocals
- Brian Christopherson – drums
- Chris Stein – bass guitar
