= Funland (Unknown Instructors album) =

Studio album by Unknown Instructors
- Released: May 12, 2009
- Recorded: 2006
- Genre: Experimental rock, improvised music
- Label: Smog Veil
- Producer: Joe Baiza, Joe Carducci, Dan McGuire

Unknown Instructors chronology
| The Master's Voice (2006) | Funland (2009) | Unwilling to Explain (2019) |

Professional ratings
Review scores
| Source | Rating |
|---|---|
| Rolling Stone | 3/5 stars |
| Punknews.org | 3.5/5 stars |
| Spectrum Culture | 1/5 stars |

Funland is the third album by American improvisational band Unknown Instructors, featuring Mike Watt (The Minutemen, fIREHOSE, The Stooges, Dos, Banyan), George Hurley (The Minutemen, fIREHOSE, Red Krayola), Joe Baiza (Saccharine Trust, Universal Congress Of), poet/saxophonist Dan McGuire. The album features guest vocals by David Thomas (Pere Ubu) and artist Raymond Pettibon.

The album was recorded at the same time as the previous album, The Master's Voice.

== Reception ==
Mark Kemp of Rolling Stone gave the album three out of five stars. Mike Villano of Metro Times praised the "experimental and eclectic sounds" as well as the vocals and said "If you didn't know better, in fact, you might think this is a lost Captain Beefheart album." Punknews.org gave it three and a half stars calling it "a fantastic musical trip." James Yates of Staten Island Advance said "the groove-heavy sinew and heady humor heard on "Funland" provides a singular trip that touches the deep recesses of mind and body, opening all kinds of guarded emotions and new possibilities" but found the 10-minute-long "No Chirping" indulgent.

Brian Loeper of Spectrum Culture was less enamored with the album saying "Under no circumstances should anyone ever listen to this album" and giving it a single star. Graham Sanford of Gapers Block also criticized the album sarcastically calling the band "the '80s punk/alt-rock set...equivalent of the Traveling Wilburys" and compared them to "The Magic Band as fronted by four Ken Nordines in search of a roadmap."

== Track listing ==
1. "Maji Yabai"
2. "Those Were the Days"
3. "Later That Night"
4. "Frownland" (Captain Beefheart cover)
5. "Door Of No Return"
6. "Afternoon Spent At The Bar, Sunny"
7. "C'mon"
8. "Chicago, Illinois"
9. "Lead!"
10. "No Words"
11. "No Chirping"
12. "Last Waltz"

== Personnel ==
- Mike Watt - bass, vocals on track 1,8
- George Hurley - drums
- Joe Baiza - guitar
- Dan McGuire - vocals
- David Thomas - vocals on track 6
- Raymond Pettibon- vocals on track 9
