= Past Lives (Saccharine Trust album) =

Live album by Saccharine Trust
- Released: 1989
- Recorded: 1981 – 1986
- Genre: Post-hardcore
- Length: 73:45
- Label: SST (149)
- Producers: Joe Baiza and Jack Brewer

Saccharine Trust chronology
The Sacramental Element (1986)	Past Lives (1989)	The Great One Is Dead (2001)

Professional ratings
Review scores
Source	Rating
Allmusic	4/5 stars

Past Lives is a compilation of live performances of post-hardcore band Saccharine Trust, released in 1989 through SST.

== Track listing ==
No.	Title	Writer(s)	Recorded	Length
1.	"Devin's Poem"	Sarno	9/27/86, Ventura, California	2:01
2.	"A Human Certainty"	Baiza and Brewer	3/1/85, The Stone, San Francisco, California	6:29
3.	"Our Discovery"	Baiza, Brewer and Cicero	8/26/84, The Stone, San Francisco, California	3:24
4.	"Young Lamb"	Baiza, Brewer and Cicero	6/9/85, McCabe's Guitar Shop, Santa Monica, California	0:57
5.	"Six Pack"	Ginn	Rat Soundboard	2:43
6.	"The Cat.Cracker"	Baiza, Brewer and Cicero	3/1/85, The Stone, San Francisco, California	4:33
7.	"11 Samuel CH 4"	Traditional arr.	8/26/84, The Stone, San Francisco, California	3:11
8.	"I Have..."	Baiza and Brewer	8/26/84, The Stone, San Francisco, California	1:47
9.	"The Giver Takes"	Baiza and Brewer	8/26/84, The Stone, San Francisco, California	2:02
10.	"Express Yourself"	Wright	CBGB's, Manhattan, New York	3:30
11.	"Take Us Now"	Baiza, Brewer, Cicero and Fitzer	CBGB's, Manhattan, New York	4:18
12.	"For Her While"	Baiza, Brewer, Cicero and Fitzer	8/17/85, KPFK FM Studios, North Hollywood, California	4:32
13.	"Speak"	Baiza, Brewer and Cicero	3/1/85, The Stone, San Francisco, California	3:17
14.	"Effort to Waste"	Baiza and Brewer	11/81, The Milestone, Charlotte, North Carolina	3:03
15.	"Effort to Waste II"	Baiza and Brewer	CBGB's, Manhattan, New York	3:26
16.	"A Lasting Thought for a Dying Cell"	Baiza and Brewer	82', Radio Tokyo, Los Angeles, California	1:48
17.	"The Need"	Baiza and Brewer	9/11/86, The Anti Club, Hollywood, California	2:29
18.	"Hearts and Barbarians"	Baiza and Brewer	11/81, The Milestone, Charlotte, North Carolina	1:25
19.	"No Lunch"	Baiza, Brewer, Cicero and Fitzer		2:13
20.	"Peace Frog"	Krieger and Morrison	3/1/85, The Stone, San Francisco, California	3:37
21.	"We Became Snakes"	Baiza, Brewer, Cicero and Fitzer	9/27/86, Ventura, California	7:01
22.	"Frankie on a Pony"	Baiza	CBGB's, Manhattan, New York	5:59
