= Worldbroken =

Live album by Saccharine Trust
- Released: 1985
- Recorded: June 9, 1985 at McCabe's Guitar Shop in Santa Monica, California
- Genre: Post-hardcore
- Length: 41:45
- Label: SST (046)
- Producer: Joe Carducci, Saccharine Trust

Saccharine Trust chronology
Surviving You, Always (1984)	Worldbroken (1985)	We Became Snakes (1986)

Professional ratings
Review scores
Source	Rating
Allmusic	4/5 stars

Worldbroken is a live album by post-hardcore band Saccharine Trust, released in 1985 through SST. The album was recorded live and completely improvised. Mike Watt of Minutemen stepped in to play bass for the 1985 show.

Worldbroken received critical praise and was an influence on Unknown Instructors' first album The Way Things Work Double bassist Damon Smith, who appeared on the Grizzly Man soundtrack, has credited the album with altering his views on punk rock, jazz, and free-form jamming.

== Reception ==
Byron Coley said, "this LP takes the show's three or four long, twisting pieces and breaks them up into a piker's dozen of shorter but no less twisting 'songs'. The basic sound is of four tuxedoed gents bravely fighting the incessant urge-to-riff that rattles around in the subconscious of most electro-musicians." Andrea Enthal at Spin said "guitars screech in sinewy saws like an 80s answer to the saxophone while Jack Brewer recites latter-day beatnikisms in a voice that sounds, at times, like the cartoon character Top Cat's sidekick, Choo Choo."

== Track listing ==
Side one
No.	Title	Length
1.	"The Worm's Quest"	3:35
2.	"Just Think"	1:35
3.	"Merciful Mother"	2:17
4.	"Estuary"	2:47
5.	"Hail Our Web"	0:43
6.	"In This Sandbox"	5:20
7.	"II Samuel Chapter 4"	4:56

Side two
No.	Title	Length
1.	"The Testimony"	3:47
2.	"Words Left Unspoken"	5:14
3.	"Fred Presented Himself to Joseph"	4:08
4.	"On the Verge of Finding"	3:03
5.	"No Compromise Here"	4:45

== Personnel ==
Saccharine Trust

- Joe Baiza – guitar
- Jack Brewer – vocals
- Tony Cicero – drums
- Mike Watt – bass guitar

Additional musicians and production

- Glenn Aulepp – mixing
- Joe Carducci – production
- Saccharine Trust – production
- Sam Winans – engineering
