= The Sacramental Element =

Compilation album by Saccharine Trust
- Released: 1986
- Recorded: 1981 – 1983
- Genre: Post-hardcore
- Label: SST (084)
- Producer: Saccharine Trust, Spot

Saccharine Trust chronology
We Became Snakes (1986)	The Sacramental Element (1986)	Past Lives (1989)

Professional ratings
Review scores
Source	Rating
Allmusic	2.5/5 stars

The Sacramental Element is a compilation by the post-hardcore band Saccharine Trust, released in 1986 through SST. It is a cassette-only release compiling the band's first two releases, Paganicons and Surviving You, Always, accompanied by three other tracks ("Hearts & Barbarians", "Disillusioned Fool" and "A Christmas Cry") from that era.

== Track listing ==
Side one
No.	Title	Length
1.	"I Have..."	1:56
2.	"Community Lie"	1:25
3.	"Effort to Waste"	2:26
4.	"Mad at the Co."	0:36
5.	"I Am Right"	2:21
6.	"We Don't Need Freedom"	1:26
7.	"Success and Failure"	1:28
8.	"A Human Certainty"	5:10
9.	"Hearts & Barbarians"	1:58
10.	"Disillusioned Fool"	1:35
11.	"A Christmas Cry"	2:04
12.	"The Giver Takes"	1:59
13.	"Lot's Seed"	1:52
14.	"Sunk"	1:35
15.	"Speak"	3:27
16.	"The House, The System, The Concrete"	2:15

Side two
No.	Title	Length
1.	"Remnants"	3:42
2.	"The Cat.Cracker"	4:55
3.	"Our Discovery"	6:00
4.	"A Good Night's Bleeding"	1:46
5.	"Craving the Center"	1:04
6.	"Yhwh on Acid"	6:04
7.	"Peace Frog"	5:03
