= New Underground Records =

Former American record label

- Founded: 1980
- Founder: Danny Phillips; Gary Kail
- Genre: Punk rock
- Country of origin: United States
- Location: San Pedro, Los Angeles

New Underground Records was an American independent record label founded by Danny Phillips (a.k.a. Danny Dean) and Gary Kail. Phillips and Kail were influenced by D. Boon and Mike Watt's New Alliance Records label and decided to create their own to promote bands they knew. Alongside New Alliance, New Underground was one of the first DIY labels in the South Bay punk scene of the 1980s.

== Albums ==
Their compilation album, Life Is Ugly So Why Not Kill Yourself, featured songs by Red Cross ("Rich Brat" from Red Cross), Descendents ("I Wanna Be a Bear" from Milo Goes to College), Minutemen ("Shit You Hear At Parties" from The Politics of Time), Saccharine Trust (Disillusion Fool), Mood of Defiance ("Empty Me" from Now), and Ill Will ("Paranoid Midnight Deposit".) Kail came up with the title for the compilation.

Other compilations were entitled Life Is Beautiful So Why Not Eat Health Food? and Life Is Boring So Why Not Steal This Record?, with the latter featuring artwork by Raymond Pettibon. Phillips named these albums. A fourth was planned but never completed.

=== Discography ===
Mood of Defiance

- Now (1982)

Anti

- I Don't Want To Die In Your War (1982)
- Defy The System (1983)
- God Can't Bounce (1984)

Zurich 1916

- Creative Nihilism (1984)

Compilations

- Life Is Beautiful So Why Not Eat Health Food? (1981)
- Life Is Ugly So Why Not Kill Yourself (1982)
- Life Is Boring So Why Not Steal This Record? (1983)

== Legacy ==
Life Is Ugly So Why Not Kill Yourself was re-released by Delerium Records in 2001.
