= Unwilling to Explain =

Studio album by Unknown Instructors
- Released: February 22, 2019
- Recorded: December, 2011
- Venue: Bisquiteen, Amherst, MA; Casa Hanzo, San Pedro, CA; Cleanest Dirty Shirt, Toledo, OH; tHUNDERpANTS, San Pedro, CA
- Genre: Experimental rock, improvised music
- Length: 43:35
- Label: ORG Music
- Producer: Mike Watt, Dan McGuire

Unknown Instructors chronology
Funland (2009)	Unwilling to Explain (2019)

Unwilling to Explain is the fourth album by American improvisational band Unknown Instructors, featuring Mike Watt (The Minutemen, fIREHOSE), George Hurley (Minutemen, fIREHOSE), J Mascis (Dinosaur Jr.), and Dan McGuire.

It was the first Unknown Instructors album that wasn't improvised and the first to feature Mascis on guitar instead of Baiza. The recording took quite some time with Watt recording bass tracks in 2011 and Hurley laying down the drums the following year. Mascis' guitar work was recorded three years after that with Dan McGuire's vocals following.

== Reception ==
David Arnson of Music Connection called it "truly interesting" but warned "Your mileage may vary on the Tom Waits- and Bukowski-influenced bop narration. The real take- away is Mascis’ fluid and expressive guitar work." Razorcake's Michael T. Fournier praised it saying it "hangs together better than any of the group’s other records I’ve heard." Mark Hughson of Jersey Beat said "If you’re into on-the-fly jazz rock you’ll be hard pressed to find better indie star power."

== Personnel ==
- Mike Watt - bass
- George Hurley - drums
- J Mascis - guitar
- Dan McGuire - vocals
- Joe Baiza - vocals
- Stephen Haluska - harp
- Leah Jenssen - cello
- Dan Wenninger - saxophone

Production

- Dave Gardner - Mastering
- Mike Watt - Producer
- Dan McGuire - Producer
