= Damon Smith =

American bassist (born 1972)

- Born: Damon Jesse Smith; October 17, 1972 (age 53); Spokane, Washington
- Genres: free jazz, free improvisation
- Occupation: Musician
- Instrument: double bass
- Years active: 1990s–present
- Label: Balance Point Acoustics
- Website: balancepointacoustics.com

Damon Smith (born October 17, 1972) is an American free improvising bassist. He has worked with Cecil Taylor, Peter Brötzmann, Marshall Allen, John Tchicai, Elliott Sharp, Chris Cutler, Fred Frith, Jim O'Rourke etc.

== Biography ==
Smith spent his childhood in eastern Washington but moved to Oakland in the mid-1980s. He took up bass in his late teens, inspired by the Minutemen's Mike Watt. His love of Minutemen got him to explore other bands on the SST Records label which led to his discovery of Henry Kaiser, Elliott Sharp and Saccharine Trust. Smith credited Saccharine Trust's improvised live album Worldbroken with altering his views on punk rock, jazz, and free-form jamming. Eventually Damon was fortunate enough to meet Kaiser and the two have collaborated for over twenty years including more than ten recordings together.

Initially an electric bass player due to his love of Minutemen and Watt's followup band fIREHOSE, Smith switched to double bass and began focusing on improvisation inspired by Peter Kowald and his album Duos:Europa

Smith studied with Bill Douglas, Lisle Ellis, Kristin Zerneg, Bertram Turetsky etc.

In 2001, Smith launched his own record label called Balance Point Acoustics.

More recently, Smith has played with Weasel Walter in his Weasel Walter Quartet and in Plane Crash which also includes Henry Kaiser. The latter expanded to become Astral Plane Crash with the inclusion of Vinny Golia and Bob Moses. In 2023 he toured the northeastern US playing in a trio with guitarist Joe Baiza and drummer Matt Crane.

Smith has also collaborated with Werner Herzog on soundtracks to his documentary films Grizzly Man and Encounters at the End of the World.

== Discography ==
- Color Architecture (Limited Sedition, 1999)
- A Tribute to John Stevens and the SME with Sextessense (Balance Point Acoustics, 2006)
- Winter Solos (Balance Point Acoustics, 2019)
- Contradictory Consequences 1999 (Balance Point Acoustics, 2020)
- Variations for Double Bass 1961 Benjamin Patterson (Balance Point Acoustics, 2020)
- Whatever Is Not Stone Is Light (Balance Point Acoustics, 2020)

With Emergency String Quartet

- Hill Music (Spring Garden Music, 2001)
- Motions Last (Visible Dog, 2002)
- On the Corner (Public Eyesore, 2002)

With Alvin Fielder

- From-to-From (Balance Point Acoustics, 2013)
- Song for Chico (Balance Point Acoustics, 2016)
- The Shape Finds Its Own Space (FMR, 2016)

With Vinny Golia

- Healing Force (Cuneiform, 2007)
- Grosses Messer (ugEXPLODE, 2009)
- Astral Plane Crash (Balance Point Acoustics, 2018)

With William Hooker

- Earth's Orbit (NoBusiness, 2010)
- Triangles of Force (Balance Point Acoustics 2014)
- Remembering (Astral Spirits, 2018)

With Henry Kaiser

- Domo Arigato Derek-Sensei! (Balance Point Acoustics, 2006)
- Plane Crash (ugEXPLODE, 2009)
- Encounters at the End of the World (Fractal Music, 2013)
- Plane Crash Two (New Atlantis, 2015)
- Relations (Balance Point Acoustics, 2015)
- The Celestial Squid (Cuneiform, 2015)
- Indestrucible Fantasy (Fractal Music, 2016)
- Nearly Extinct (Balance Point Acoustics, 2016)
- More Requia (Metalanguage, 2019)

With Weasel Walter

- Revolt Music (ugEXPLODE, 2006)
- Firestorm (ugEXPLODE, 2007)
- Large Group Performances 2007–2009 (ugEXPLODE, 2009)
- Invasion (ugEXPLODE, 2010)

With others

- Jaap Blonk, Hugo Ball: Sechs Laut-Und Klanggedichte, 1916 (Balance Point Acoustics, 2014)
- Jaap Blonk, North of Blanco (Balance Point Acoustics, 2014)
- John Butcher, The Catastrophe of Minimalism (Balance Point Acoustics, 2017)
- Carlo Actis Dato, USA Tour & April 2001 & Live (Splasc(h) 2001)
- Marco Eneidi, Ghetto Calypso (Not Two, 2006)
- Marco Eneidi, Marco Eneidi & the American Jungle Orchestra (Botticelli, 1996)
- Peter Evans, Oculus Ex Abyssus (ugEXPLODE, 2008)
- Peter Evans, Untitled (ugEXPLODE, 2008)
- Burton Greene, Life's Intense Mystery (Astral Spirits, 2019)
- Pandelis Karayorgis, Cliff (Driff, 2018)
- Pandelis Karayorgis, CliffPools (Driff, 2020)
- Peter Kowald, Mirrors Broken But No Dust (Balance Point Acoustics, 2001)
- Joe McPhee, Six Situations (Not Two, 2017)
- Kenny Millions, Fuck Music... Tell Jokes You'll Make More Money (Unhinged, 2018)
- Gino Robair, I, Norton: An Opera in Real Time (Rastascan, 2009)
- Richard Thompson, Music from Grizzly Man (Proper, 2018)
- Dave Tucker, Tenderloin (Pax, 2004)
- Bertram Turetzky, Thoughtbeetle (Balance Point Acoustics)
- Fred Van Hove, Burns Longer (Balance Point Acoustics, 2013)
