= Estuary (disambiguation) =

An estuary is a semi-enclosed body of water flowing into the sea.

Estuary may also refer to:

- Estuary English, a variety of English spoken in the south east of England
- Estuary, Saskatchewan, a community of Saskatchewan, Canada
- "Estuary", a song by Saccharine Trust from the album Worldbroken
