= This Is Mecolodics =

EP by Universal Congress Of
- Released: 1988
- Genre: Free jazz, noise rock
- Length: 29:35
- Label: SST (204)
- Producer: Vitus Mataré, Universal Congress Of

Universal Congress Of chronology
Prosperous and Qualified (1988)	This Is Mecolodics (1988)	The Sad and Tragic Demise of Big Fine Hot Salty Black Wind (1991)

Professional ratings
Review scores
Source	Rating
Allmusic	3/5 stars

This Is Mecolodics is an EP by the free jazz ensemble Universal Congress Of, released in 1988 by SST Records. The cover art is modeled after the 1961 album This Is Our Music by saxophonist Ornette Coleman, a key influence on bandleader Joe Baiza.

== Accolades ==
Publication	Country	Accolade	Year	Rank
Spex	Germany	Albums of the Year	1988	2

== Track listing ==
No.	Title	Writer(s)	Length
1.	"Niños de la Tierra"	Joe Baiza	12:26
2.	"All Your Love"	Otis Rush	3:14
3.	"Happy Birthday"	public domain	3:20
4.	"Law Years"	Ornette Coleman	5:11
5.	"Joey"	Joe Baiza	5:24

== Personnel ==
Adapted from the This Is Mecolodics liner notes.

Universal Congress Of

- Joe Baiza – guitar
- Ralph Gorodetsky – bass guitar
- Jason Kahn – drums
- Steve Moss – tenor saxophone

Additional musicians

- Guy Bennett – trombone (3)
- Lynn Johnston – tenor saxophone (3)

Production and additional personnel

- Martin Lyon – photography
- Vitus Mataré – production
- Universal Congress Of – production

== Release history ==
Region	Date	Label	Format	Catalog
United States	1988	SST	CD, LP	SST 204
