= Sparkling Fresh =

Live album by Universal Congress Of
- Released: April 21, 1998
- Recorded: 1996 in Germany
- Genre: Free jazz, noise rock
- Length: 56:32
- Label: Hazelwood
- Producer: Joe Baiza, Christian Bornitz and Gordon Friedrich

Universal Congress Of chronology
The Eleventh-Hour Shine-On (1992)	Sparkling Fresh (1998)

Professional ratings
Review scores
Source	Rating
Allmusic	4/5 stars

Sparkling Fresh is a live performances album by free jazz ensemble Universal Congress Of, released on April 21, 1998 through Hazelwood Records.

== Track listing ==
No.	Title	Writer(s)	Length
1.	"Barbecue"		0:22
2.	"Small World"	Jackson	3:27
3.	"Almost Positive"	Lines	5:11
4.	"3 and 4"	Baiza and Gaeta	5:15
5.	"Full-Bodied Naked Hug"	Baiza and Moss	4:57
6.	"Kyle's Theme"	Pope	4:28
7.	"Uh Huh"	Baiza and Gorodetsky	4:24
8.	"Freight Train"	Baiza and Gorodetsky	4:01
9.	"Bermuda Blues"	Threadgill	10:53
10.	"Cleo's Mood"	Junior Walker	2:43
11.	"Marginal"	Baiza and Gorodetsky	3:18
12.	"Mousetrap"	Gaeta	4:40
13.	"Mud Man Blues"	Baiza and Moss	2:53

== Personnel ==
Universal Congress Of

- Joe Baiza – guitar, vocals, production
- Steve Gaeta – bass guitar
- Paul Lines – drums
- Steve Moss – tenor saxophone, vocals and harp on "Mud Man Blues"

Additional musicians and production

- Christian Bornitz – production
- Gordon Friedrich – production, engineering
- Unkle Jan – engineering
- Jan Schmelcher – illustrations
