= Prosperous and Qualified =

Studio album by Universal Congress Of
- Released: May 16, 1988
- Recorded: November 1987
- Studio: Lyceum Sound Recorders (Santa Monica, CA)
- Genre: Free jazz, noise rock
- Length: 39:58
- Label: SST (180)
- Producer: Vitus Mataré, Universal Congress Of

Universal Congress Of chronology
Joe Baiza & The Universal Congress Of (1987)	Prosperous and Qualified (1988)	This Is Mecolodics (1988)

Professional ratings
Review scores
Source	Rating
AllMusic	4/5 stars

Prosperous and Qualified is the second studio album by free jazz ensemble Universal Congress Of. The album was released in May 16, 1988 through SST.

== Track listing ==
All tracks are written by Universal Congress Of, except "Hightime" by James Blood Ulmer and "Mellow Down Easy" by Willie Dixon.

No.	Title	Length
1.	"Dancing on Plato's Tomb"	4:28
2.	"Spreadin' the Malice"	3:27
3.	"Hightime"	5:45
4.	"Stovetop"	3:39
5.	"Mellow Down Easy"	3:35
6.	"Igor's Blues"	4:58
7.	"Love Camp"	4:18
8.	"Stepback"	4:05
9.	"L.L. Kook"	5:42

== Personnel ==
Adapted from the Prosperous and Qualified liner notes.

Universal Congress Of

- Joe Baiza – guitar, vocals
- Jacob Cohn – alto saxophone
- Ralph Gorodetsky – bass guitar
- Jason Kahn – drums
- Lynn Johnston – tenor saxophone, clarinet, bass guitar, baritone saxophone
- Steve Moss – tenor saxophone, vocals

Production and additional personnel

- Martin Lyon – photography
- Vitus Mataré – production, engineering
- Universal Congress Of – production

== Release history ==
Region	Date	Label	Format	Catalog
United States	May 16, 1988	SST	CD, CS, LP	SST 180
