= Buzz Clic =

American musician and songwriter

Buzz Clic (born Elmer Charles Brandt Jr.; May 25, 1949 in Cleveland, Ohio) is an American musician and songwriter best known as the lead guitarist for the punk rock band, the Rubber City Rebels.

== Early years ==
After a late ’60s period that saw him residing in Northern California and even attending the Altamont Speedway Free Festival in December 1969, Clic returned to his hometown of Hudson, Ohio and began playing guitar—eventually settling in with a local outfit called Bold Chicken (whose recordings were later documented on a Smog Veil Records release) in 1971. Upon the demise of Bold Chicken in 1973 and an aborted stint in a cover band, Clic hooked up with Hudson friend Rod Firestone and Donny Damage to form King Cobra. While King Cobra’s repertoire was mostly heavy metal and glam covers such as UFO, Alice Cooper and Silverhead, the band’s set list also featured Stooges and New York Dolls numbers—virtually unheard of in the pre-punk mid-’70s.

== Rubber City Rebels ==
Eventually the band’s punk inclinations won out. After witnessing Johnny Thunders and the Heartbreakers at the Piccadilly Inn in Cleveland in early 1976, Clic, Firestone and Damage scrapped the cover-band format in favor of originals. They soon took over a local Akron club called the Crypt, booking like-minded locals such as Devo (who also opened for King Cobra), Pere Ubu, the Bizarros and the Dead Boys. On the suggestion of Dead Boys singer Stiv Bators, King Cobra renamed themselves the Rubber City Rebels.

The Crypt closed in early 1977, but the Rebels soldiered on, recording a critically acclaimed split-LP with the Bizarros called From Akron and building a live reputation. After sampling the New York scene with shows at CBGB, the Rebels moved to Hollywood, California near the end of the year and started gigging at venues such as the Masque, the Whisky and the Starwood. This led to a contract with Sire Records in 1978, which soon became embroiled in controversy as the band was dropped within months.

After lineup changes and another year of building their club following, the Rebels landed a deal with Capitol thanks to band friend Doug Fieger of the Knack, who went on to produce their self-titled debut album, released in 1980. After Capitol rejected demos for a second album in early 1981, the Rubber City Rebels moved on to Elektra. But their association with the latter was even shorter, as the group was dropped after recording four songs for an album that never materialized. By 1982, the band was essentially finished, though sporadic reunion shows were undertaken later in the decade.

== Solo and reunion years ==
Clic struck up a friendship with Phil Seymour (who had hits both with the Dwight Twilley Band and as a solo artist) in the ensuing years, which bore fruit on a self-released 1991 cassette-only album, Buzz Clic with Phil Seymour. However, the duo couldn’t find any takers among record labels, and Seymour died of cancer in 1993. Ultimately, the record would earn release when Smog Veil reissued it as a download and limited-edition CD titled California.

Meanwhile, the 1990s saw a resurgence of interest in the Rubber City Rebels, whose songs were covered by underground punk acts like the Bobbyteens, the Candy Snatchers and the Raydios. By 2001, the Rebels were up and running again, playing select gigs in the United States, touring Europe three times and Japan once, and releasing the critically acclaimed 2003 album Pierce My Brain.

The latter was released on Smog Veil Records thanks to label owner Frank Mauceri, who the Rebels met at a reunion gig. Smog Veil has also reissued the aforementioned Bold Chicken and Phil Seymour recordings, as well as two CDs by the Buzz Clic Adventure, Yadang (1998) and Escape from Bolivian (2011). While showing hints of the Rebels, Clic’s solo material is more hard rock than punk.

The Rubber City Rebels continue to gig and released a new Smog Veil single (“Annoyed, Destroyed, Unemployed” b/w “The Ballad of the Rubber City Rebels”) in 2011, while Clic also plans to performs live with his latest project. A Bold Chicken 45 EP of 1972 studio recordings was released on Lysergic Sound Distributors in the fall of 2011, and in 2015, Clic released another solo album, Return from Nowhere.

== Gear ==
Clic started his music career playing a Gibson SG through a 100-watt Marshall stack. Marshall remains his preferred amplification, though around 1974 he bought his first Gibson Flying V and has used the model almost exclusively since. For recording Clic uses various Gibson, Fender, Martin and Gretsch guitars and assorted vintage and boutique amps. His effects include various distortion pedals—with the sound of an Ibanez Tubescreamer or modified Boss Blues Driver preferred.
