= A Wailing of a Town =

Book on the San Pedro punk scene

A Wailing Of A Town: An Oral History of Early San Pedro Punk And More 1977-1985
- First edition
- Author: Craig Ibarra
- Language: English
- Subject: Punk rock
- Genre: Music
- Publisher: END FWY Press
- Publication date: April 1, 2015
- Publication place: United States
- Pages: 344
- ISBN: 978-0986097102

A Wailing Of A Town: An Oral History of Early San Pedro Punk And More 1977-1985 is a non-fiction oral history of the San Pedro punk scene of the late 70s to the mid-1980s. Authored by Craig Ibarra, the book consists of 70+ interviews with band members (including members of Minutemen, Saccharine Trust, and Black Flag), photographers, and punk fans.

While the book expends about a quarter of its length on the well-known Minutemen, the book has been seen as a sort of rebuttal to the Hollywood-centric We Got the Neutron Bomb the book focuses on lesser known bands such as Saccharine Trust, Hari-Kari, Peer Group, Mood of Defiance and The Plebs. Ibarra spent seven years working on the book. Ibarra first got the idea for the book in January 2007 after reading Please Kill Me and We Got the Neutron Bomb.

The book was released on April 1, 2015, D. Boon's birthday.

== Reception ==
A Wailing Of A Town has received quite positive reviews. SLUG magazine praised the "excellent and essential, detailed oral history" and called the book "a must have." Rich Cocksedge of PunkNews.org gave the book four and a half stars out of five. Layla of Maximumrocknroll said "This book is one of the best accounts of punk I have read." Kelley O'Death of Razorcake described the book as "painstakingly thorough, richly detailed, and impeccably researched" and ultimately declared it "required reading for anyone who believes that, as Jacobelly puts it in the book’s prologue, 'Punk Rock is what you make it.'"
