= History Lesson – Part II =

Minutemen song

Song by Minutemen

from the album Double Nickels on the Dime
- Released: July 1984
- Recorded: November 1983, April 1984
- Studio: Radio Tokyo Studios, Venice, California
- Genre: Indie rock; post-punk
- Length: 2:10
- Label: SST
- Songwriter: Mike Watt
- Producer: Ethan James

"History Lesson – Part II" is a song by the American punk rock band Minutemen from the 1984 album Double Nickels on the Dime. The song, written by Mike Watt, is about the relationship between Watt and singer D. Boon as they first played music together.

The song is subtitled "Part II" as an earlier Minutemen composition titled "History Lesson" was included on their 1981 release, The Punch Line. Watt claims he wrote the song to humanize themselves.

People thought we were spacemen, but we were just Pedro corndogs – our band could be your life! You could be us, this could be you.

== Lyrics ==
The song was penned by Watt and, as such, makes specific reference to Boon in the third person ("me and D. Boon, we played for years"). However, when the song was recorded, Boon performed lead vocals and changed the third person references to Watt ("me and Mike Watt, we played for years"). The lyrics, as printed on the cover of Double Nickels on the Dime, contain the original references to Boon despite the difference in the actual recording.

Additional references are made to E. Bloom of Blue Öyster Cult, Richard Hell of the Voidoids, Joe Strummer of The Clash, and John Doe of X, as well as to Bob Dylan.

== Legacy ==
The song's iconic first line was used as the title of the book Our Band Could Be Your Life: Scenes from the American Indie Underground, 1981–1991, by Michael Azerrad.

The first stanza of the song also includes the line "Punk rock changed our lives." The band Sublime sampled this line for their song "Waiting for My Ruca" on their debut album 40oz. to Freedom.

Mat Honan of Gizmodo has claimed the DIY ethos of the band as epitomized in this song "is a hacker mindset. It is geek-forward."

In 2022, the band Horsegirl released a cover of the song.
