= Unknown Instructors =

Musical group

Unknown Instructors are an all-star improvisational rock outfit that features the former rhythm section of Minutemen and fIREHOSE, bassist Mike Watt and drummer George Hurley; Saccharine Trust members, guitarist Joe Baiza and vocalist Jack Brewer; and vocalist/saxophonist Dan McGuire. They have been described as "an all-star reunion of alumni from the SST stable of yore" and Henry Rollins called it a dream lineup.

Their first album, The Way Things Work, was released in late September 2005 by Smog Veil Records. In October 2005, they returned to the studio to record a second album, this time with Pere Ubu's David Thomas and artist Raymond Pettibon as added participants. The finished product, The Master's Voice, was released in March, 2007. A third album, Funland, followed in 2009. In 2019, the fourth album entitled Unwilling to Explain was released with J Mascis on guitar. It was the first Unknown Instructors album that wasn't improvised.

== Discography ==
- The Way Things Work (2005, Smog Veil Records)
- The Master's Voice (2007, Smog Veil Records)
- Funland (2009, Smog Veil Records)
- Unwilling to Explain (2019, Org Music)
