= The Sad and Tragic Demise of Big Fine Hot Salty Black Wind =

Studio album by Universal Congress Of
- Released: October 17, 1991
- Recorded: August 1990
- Studio: Baby Monster Studios (New York City, NY)
- Genre: Free jazz, noise rock, jazzcore
- Length: 46:26
- Label: Enemy
- Producer: Michael Knuth, Universal Congress Of

Universal Congress Of chronology
This Is Mecolodics (1988)	The Sad and Tragic Demise of Big Fine Hot Salty Black Wind (1991)	The Eleventh-Hour Shine-On (1992)

Professional ratings
Review scores
Source	Rating
Allmusic	3/5 stars

The Sad and Tragic Demise of Big Fine Hot Salty Black Wind is the third album by free jazz ensemble Universal Congress Of, released on October 17, 1991 by Enemy Records.

== Track listing ==
No.	Title	Writer(s)	Length
1.	"Freight Train"	Joe Baiza, Ralph Gorodetsky	3:38
2.	"Small World"	Ronald Shannon Jackson	3:12
3.	"Tight Heat"	Baiza, Gorodetsky, Devin Sarno	3:37
4.	"Bermuda Blues"	Henry Threadgill	7:20
5.	"Marginal"	Baiza, Gorodetsky	3:25
6.	"Almost Positive"	Paul Lines	5:07
7.	"Uh-Huh"	Baiza, Gorodetsky	4:05
8.	"Kyle's Theme"	Odean Pope	2:15
9.	"Ell's Choir Robe"	Baiza, Steve Moss	3:32
10.	"Pickled Bullhorn"	Baiza, Gorodetsky, Moss	5:02
11.	"Man With the Woman"	Baiza, Bob Fitzer	5:13

== Personnel ==
Adapted from The Sad and Tragic Demise of Big Fine Hot Salty Black Wind liner notes.

Universal Congress Of

- Joe Baiza – guitar, vocals, design
- Bob Fitzer – bass guitar
- Paul Lines – drums
- Steve Moss – tenor saxophone

Additional musicians

- Elliott Sharp – guitar (10, 11)

Production and additional personnel

- Bryce Goggin – engineering
- Michael Knuth – production
- A.T. Michael MacDonald – mastering
- Devin Sarno – design
- Universal Congress Of – production

== Release history ==
Region	Date	Label	Format	Catalog
United States	1991	Enemy	CD, LP	EMY 117
