= Mood of Defiance =

American punk rock band

- Origin: San Pedro, California, U.S.
- Genres: Punk rock; hardcore punk
- Years active: 1981–1984

Mood of Defiance was an American punk rock band from San Pedro, California. Dave Markey described their music as "very atypical for Southern California hardcore—almost psychedelic, but still really aggressive."

== History ==
The band grew from a previous synthesizer-based band called Kindled Imagination featuring Rachel "Hatha" Mason on synth and Greg Hurley (brother of Minutemen drummer George) on vocals and drums.

Hatha decided she wanted to sing so she put an ad in The Recycler and guitarist T.A. Black (Tom Ybarra) and bassist Kevin Ball replied. Soon drummer Ritchie Wilder left Saccharine Trust and joined the group. The band name was taken from a headline in an issue of Time which read "MIDDLE EAST: A Mood of Defiance".

A seven track demo was made in 1981 at Media Art with SST house engineer Spot producing. The band began playing shows around town and Hatha became known for her outrageous stage antics such as burning a flag onstage, performing while wearing a wedding dress or covered in fake vomit.

About a year after forming, Black and Ball left the band to be replaced by Danny Phillips (a.k.a. Danny Dean) who was previously of the South Bay band Easter, and Gary Kail of the band Anti. Wilder eventually left as well to be replaced by a drummer named Thaddeus. This lineup recorded the album Now.

By 1984, the band ended.

== Legacy ==
The band's "Divided States Of America" was chosen as one of "10 Essential Southern California Hardcore Songs" by Dave Markey and Jordan Schwartz, authors of We Got Power: Hardcore Punk Scenes From 1980's Southern California. Their track "Empty Me" was featured on Life Is Ugly – LA Punk Compilation originally released by New Underground Records in 1983 and re-released by Delerium Records in 2001.

== Discography ==
- Now (New Underground Records, 1982)
- In A Box – release of the 1981 demos (Water Under the Bridge Records 2015)
