= Our Band Could Be Your Life =

Book by Michael Azerrad

- Author: Michael Azerrad
- Language: English
- Subject: Underground music
- Genre: Music
- Publisher: Little Brown
- Publication date: 2001
- Publication place: United States
- ISBN: 0-316-78753-1
- OCLC: 50483014

Our Band Could Be Your Life: Scenes from the American Indie Underground, 1981–1991 is a book by Michael Azerrad. It chronicles the careers of several underground rock bands who, while finding little or no mainstream success, were hugely influential in establishing American alternative and indie rock, mostly through nearly constant touring and records released on small, regional independent record labels. Azerrad conducted many interviews with band members, and also conducted extensive research of old fanzines, as well as more mainstream newspapers and books.

== Content ==
The inspiration for the book occurred when Azerrad was watching a miniseries about rock music history. According to Azerrad, after exploring the punk era "it skipped and went straight from Talking Heads to Nirvana. "I thought, This is insane. Did I black out for 10 minutes? I thought that someone should do something about this. And I had, appropriately enough, a DIY moment and I thought, Maybe I should do it."

The title comes from the opening line of "History Lesson – Part II", an autobiographical song written by Mike Watt of Minutemen, one of the bands featured in the book. The song, which is on the album Double Nickels on the Dime, details the band's working class origins and populist sentiments: "Punk rock changed our lives." The book is dedicated to the lives of D. Boon (Minutemen) and Bob Stinson (The Replacements).

The book focuses on 13 bands:

- Black Flag (from Hermosa Beach/Los Angeles, California)
- Minutemen (from San Pedro/Los Angeles, California)
- Mission of Burma (from Boston, Massachusetts)
- Minor Threat (from Washington, D.C.)
- Hüsker Dü (from Minneapolis–Saint Paul, Minnesota)
- The Replacements (from Minneapolis–Saint Paul, Minnesota)
- Sonic Youth (from New York City, New York)
- Butthole Surfers (from San Antonio, Texas)
- Big Black (from Evanston/Chicago, Illinois)
- Dinosaur Jr. (from Amherst, Massachusetts)
- Fugazi (from Washington, D.C.)
- Mudhoney (from Seattle, Washington)
- Beat Happening (from Olympia, Washington)

In honor of this book's tenth anniversary, Azerrad put together a special concert at Bowery Ballroom with contemporary bands and artists to perform the music of bands covered in the text. For example, Ted Leo played Minor Threat and Titus Andronicus played The Replacements.

== Reviews ==
In 2006, The Observer rated Our Band Could Be Your Life as one of the 50 best music books ever written. In 2009, Paste magazine named the book one of the 12 best music books of the decade. The Los Angeles Times listed it as one of "46 Essential Rock Reads." In a review of the book in the Village Voice, critic Robert Christgau wrote, "...Let me give Michael Azerrad's Our Band Could Be Your Life its well-earned thumbs-up. Here's my rave: While reading this 500-page history of '80s indie-rock, I only resorted to something lighter to avoid putting my back out. All 13 profiles are page-turners."

In the New York Times Book Review, critic Eric Weisbard wrote, "In the decade Azerrad covers, indie America proved that world-class rock could be created outside corporate structures....Our Band Could Be Your Life passionately resurrects thirteen indie groups...Azerrad is adept at drawing out musicians' war stories—and this bare-bones movement was full of them." Time's Benjamin Nugent said it was "A timely reminder that Cobain and company were merely a key regiment in the motley alt-rock army...Our Band Could Be Your Life narrates, down to the homemade posters and tour van repairs, how these bands gradually built up an audience large enough to make record labels and critics take notice."

The book review website Baby Got Books said "If you graduated high school (or were at least supposed to graduate) any time between the early 1980s and the mid-1990s and have any interest whatsoever in music, you absolutely must read this book. While it tells the story of bands that truly lived the indie/punk lifestyle, it also sheds a brand new light (not always favorable) on the people in those bands. Fascinating stuff." Another writer states that "As music history, this book is important. None of these bands got much coverage in mainstream rock magazines while they were doing their most innovative and vital work, and Azerrad has done a great job of gathering ex-bandmembers up for revealing interviews...However, the book collapses under the weight of its own in-crowd cool."

Former Hüsker Dü bassist, Greg Norton, was critical of the book, stating in a 2024 interview, "When Azerrad wrote Our Band Could Be Your Life, I believe he was just looking to sensationalize a lot of stories. Yeah, there are probably some things in there that are accurate, but I think a lot of things got blown out of proportion, just to...like, 'Hey, look how crazy these guys are!' I mean, you read through his book, I think the only band that he didn't really sensationalize was the Minutemen, and I think that was just from, you know, respect and reverence for D. Boon passing."

== Audiobook ==
On May 21, 2019, the Our Band Could Be Your Life audiobook was released. The narrator for each chapter is an artist who has cited their corresponding chapter's musical act as a major influence on their own art, with Azerrad himself reading the chapter on Fugazi. Narrators and their chapters include:

- Black Flag - Dave Longstreth (singer, Dirty Projectors)
- The Minutemen - Jeff Tweedy (singer, Wilco)
- Mission of Burma - Jonathan Franzen (author, The Corrections)
- Minor Threat - Laura Jane Grace (Against Me!)
- Hüsker Dü - Colin Meloy (singer, The Decemberists)
- The Replacements - Jon Wurster (drummer; Superchunk, The Mountain Goats)
- Sonic Youth - Merrill Garbus (singer, Tune-Yards)
- Butthole Surfers - Fred Armisen (drummer, comedian)
- Big Black - Corey Taylor (singer, Slipknot)
- Dinosaur Jr. - Sharon Van Etten (singer-songwriter)
- Fugazi - Michael Azerrad
- Mudhoney - Phil Elverum (singer, Mount Eerie)
- Beat Happening - Stephin Merritt (singer, The Magnetic Fields)

== See also ==
- Gimme Indie Rock
