= Joe Baiza & The Universal Congress Of =

Studio album by Joe Baiza & The Universal Congress Of
- Released: January 12, 1987
- Recorded: May 30, 1986
- Studio: Control Center Studios (Hollywood, CA)
- Genre: Free jazz, noise rock
- Length: 33:05
- Label: SST (109)

Universal Congress Of chronology
Joe Baiza & The Universal Congress Of (1987)	Prosperous and Qualified (1988)

Professional ratings
Review scores
Source	Rating
AllMusic	2.5/5 stars

Joe Baiza & The Universal Congress Of is the debut studio album of free jazz ensemble Universal Congress Of. The album was released in January 12, 1987 through SST.

== Track listing ==
Side one
No.	Title	Length
1.	"Certain Way"	18:46

Side two
No.	Title	Length
1.	"Certain Way" (Continued)	9:56
2.	"Chasing"	4:22

== Personnel ==
Adapted from the Joe Baiza & The Universal Congress Of liner notes.

Universal Congress Of

- Joe Baiza – guitar
- Mike Demers – bass guitar
- Jason Kahn – drums
- Paul Uriaz – guitar

Production and additional personnel

- David Amico – cover art, illustrations

== Release history ==
Region	Date	Label	Format	Catalog
United States	January 12, 1987	SST	LP	SST 109
