= Surviving You, Always =

Studio album by Saccharine Trust
- Released: 1984
- Recorded: September 1983 at Total Access Recording Studios, Redondo Beach, CA
- Genre: Post-hardcore
- Length: 38:59
- Label: SST (024)
- Producer: Saccharine Trust, Spot

Saccharine Trust chronology
Paganicons (1981)	Surviving You, Always (1984)	Worldbroken (1985)

Professional ratings
Review scores
Source	Rating
Allmusic	3/5 stars

Surviving You, Always is the second release and first LP by post-hardcore band Saccharine Trust, released in 1984 through SST. Guitarist Joe Baiza was exploring Jazz at the time at the influence was reflected on the album. Much of the lyrical content contains biblical imagery. The album features a cover of "Peace Frog" by The Doors a song repeated on Saccharine Trust's live compilation Past Lives.

The cover is based on the photo by photography student Robert Wiles of Evelyn McHale, who committed suicide by jumping from the 86th floor Observation Deck of the Empire State Building on May 1, 1947.

== Track listing ==
Side one
No.	Title	Writer(s)	Length
1.	"The Giver Takes"	Baiza, Brewer and Cicero	1:59
2.	"Lot's Seed"	Baiza, Brewer, Cicero and Hodson	1:52
3.	"Sunk"	Baiza and Brewer	1:35
4.	"Speak"	Baiza, Brewer and Cicero	3:27
5.	"The House, The System, The Concrete"	Baiza, Brewer, Cicero and Hodson	2:15
6.	"Remnants"	Baiza and Brewer	3:42
7.	"The Cat.Cracker"	Baiza, Brewer and Cicero	4:55

Side two
No.	Title	Writer(s)	Length
1.	"Our Discovery"		6:00
2.	"A Good Night's Bleeding"		1:46
3.	"Craving the Center"		1:04
4.	"Yhwh on Acid"		6:04
5.	"Peace Frog"	Krieger and Morrison	5:03

== Personnel ==
Saccharine Trust

- Joe Baiza – guitar, vocals on "The Cat.Cracker"
- Jack Brewer – vocals
- Tony Cicero – drums
- Mark Hodson – bass guitar

Additional musicians and production

- Russell Conlin – cornet on "Yhwh on Acid"
- Rick Cox – alto saxophone on "The Cat.Cracker"
- Saccharine Trust – production
- Spot – production, engineering
- R.C. Wills – illustrations
