= Steve Moss (musician) =

- Genres: free jazz
- Occupation: Musician
- Instrument(s): Tenor saxophone, clarinet, harmonica, accordion, drums
- Years active: 1987–present
- Labels: SST, Enemy

Steve Moss is an American multi-instrumentalist best recognized for his work with guitarist Joe Baiza and his involvement in the band Universal Congress Of. He has also collaborated frequently with jazz saxophonist Gary Thomas and has appeared on albums by Firehose and Public Enemy.

== Discography ==
Saccharine Trust

Year	Name	Ref
1986	We Became Snakes	

Universal Congress Of

Year	Name	Ref
1988	Prosperous and Qualified	
1991	The Sad and Tragic Demise of Big Fine Hot Salty Black Wind	
1992	The Eleventh-Hour Shine-On	

Other appearances

Year	Name	Artist	Ref
1991	The Kold Kage	Gary Thomas	
1991	Apocalypse 91... The Enemy Strikes Black	Public Enemy	
