= The Eleventh-Hour Shine-On =

Studio album by Universal Congress Of
- Released: 1992
- Recorded: July & August 1992
- Studios: Music Box, Hollywood, CA
- Genres: Free jazz, noise rock
- Length: 51:08
- Label: Enemy
- Producers: Joe Baiza, Michael Knuth and Vitus Mataré

Universal Congress Of chronology
The Sad and Tragic Demise of Big Fine Hot Salty Black Wind (1991)	The Eleventh-Hour Shine-On (1992)	Sparkling Fresh (1998)

The Eleventh-Hour Shine-On is an album by the free jazz ensemble Universal Congress Of. It was released in 1992 through Enemy Records. "Broad Way Blues" is a cover of the Ornette Coleman song.

== Critical reception ==
Professional ratings
Review scores
Source	Rating
AllMusic	4/5 stars
Chicago Tribune	2/4 stars
Los Angeles Times	3/4 stars

The Los Angeles Times wrote: "Their rough, occasionally ragged style is tempered by an awareness of their limitations, the tart blend of Joe Baiza's guitar and Steve Moss' tenor, and a particular flair for slow grooves such as 'Gaetasaurus'."

== Track listing ==
No.	Title	Writer(s)	Length
1.	"Mad with Pride"	Baiza, Gonzalez, Gaeta and Moss	4:28
2.	"Baby X"	Baiza, Gonzalez, Gaeta and Moss	4:10
3.	"Gaetasaurus"	Baiza and Gaeta	3:49
4.	"Ambition Blues"	Brewer and Baiza	4:56
5.	"Blues Minor"	Coltrane	3:12
6.	"Full-Bodied Naked Hug"	Baiza and Moss	6:32
7.	"Broad Way Blues"	Coleman	4:22
8.	"Mud Man Blues"	Baiza and Moss	2:47
9.	"Instigators"	Baiza	3:13
10.	"3 and 4"	Baiza and Gaeta	4:59
11.	"Gold Tooth Girl"	Baiza, Gaeta and Gonzalez	3:21
12.	"11th Hour Shine-On"	Baiza, Cox and Gaeta	5:19

== Personnel ==
Universal Congress Of

- Joe Baiza – guitar, vocals, production, illustrations
- Steve Gaeta – bass guitar
- A.P. Gonzalez – drums
- Steve Moss – tenor saxophone, vocals and harp on "Mud Man Blues"

Additional musicians and production

- Thomas Brick – mastering
- Rick Cox – tenor saxophone
- Danny Frankel – percussion
- David Gaeta – congas on "Gaetasaurus" and "Full-Bodied Naked Hug"
- Konan Kelley – engineering
- Michael Knuth – production
- Martin Lyon – photography
- Vitus Mataré – production, mixing
- Paul S. Uriaz Jr. – illustrations
