= The Bizarros =

American band

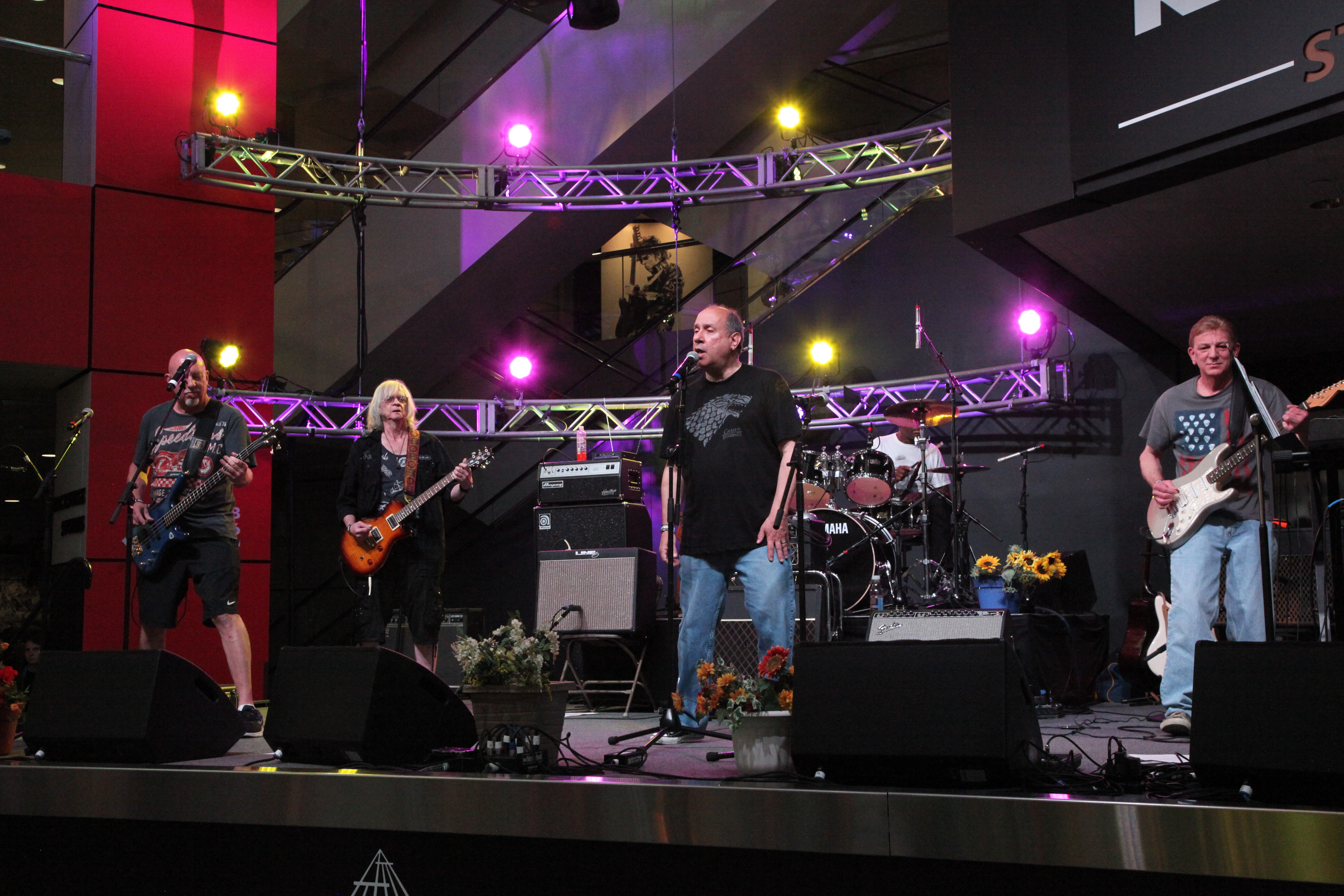
- The Bizarros performing at the Rock and Roll Hall of Fame

Background information
- Origin: Akron, Ohio, United States
- Genres: Punk rock, new wave
- Years active: 1976-1981, 1996, 2002–present
- Labels: Clone Records, Mercury Records, Stiff Records, Windian Records, Soul Jazz Records, Trikont
- Members: Nick Nicholis; Don Parkins; Jerry Parkins; Martyn Flunoy
- Past members: Terry Walker (deceased); Rick Garberson (deceased); Dave Ashley; Kal Mullens; Marty Zelei; Jim Geig (deceased)

The Bizarros are an American rock band from Akron, Ohio, formed in 1976. The nucleus of the band was formed early, when Don and Jerry Parkins met Terry Walker while Terry and Don were in the second grade. Nick Nicholis joined the group of friends a few years later during junior high school. Eventually they formed a band that became the Bizarros in their 20s. After trying out a couple of one shot drummers, Rick Garberson joined as the last member of the original lineup.

== Music ==
Nicholis embraced the DIY concept of marketing music decades before it was trendy. He started his own label, Clone Records, to release the band's music not long after the band was formed. The label become an early home for several other Akron acts. The label's first LP release was 1977's From Akron, a split album with The Rubber City Rebels which Nicholis sent to Village Voice critic Robert Christgau. Christgau, who reviewed the album favorably, shortly afterwards visited to the region and was instrumental, although not alone, in the Akron/Kent music scene becoming noticed on an international level.

== History ==
=== Origins (1970s) ===
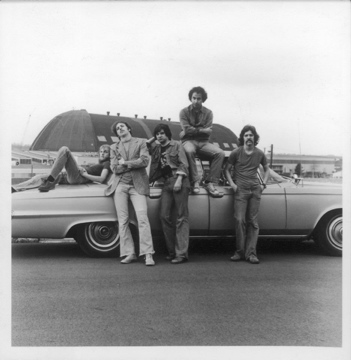
An early Bizarros publicity image in front of the Akron/Goodyear Airdock

The band were signed to the Mercury subsidiary Blank Records. New Musical Express wrote at this point that the band was starting to tone down its "hard and vicious" style, and was developing a "brooding edge that compares well with the Stranglers". In 1979, the band released its self-titled debut album on Mercury. A restructuring of the Mercury label, which included Blank being dissolved, left the band without a label. The self titled album was well received though, and was given an even stronger review by Christgau than their first album. The band released additional singles on Clone Records, including backing John Radar on his 1979 Single One Step at a Time/Get You Back in 1979. But the Mercury disappointment, along with the untimely death of drummer Garberson, resulted in Nicholis deciding to step away from the music world and concentrate on a more stable career; by this time Nicholis was married with children. The Parkins Brothers and Walker continued on for a short time, adding a few friends to their lineup, but in under a year the band ended its original run.

=== 1990s-2020s ===
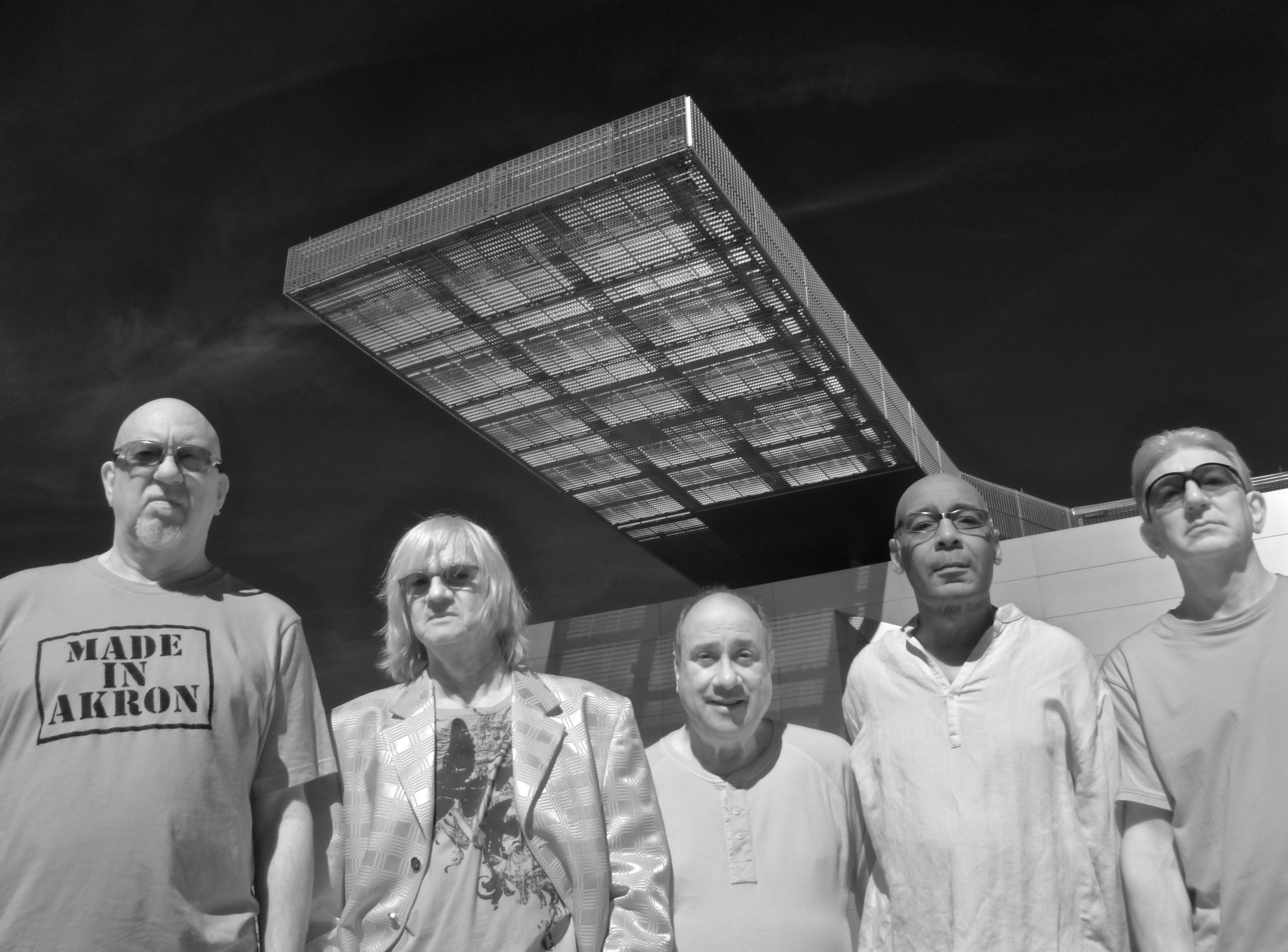
From the cover of the Bizarros' 2019 release, From Akron II

Walker, Nicholis and the Parkins Brothers all remained friends, frequently socializing with each other, but as the Bizarros they only briefly reunited in 1996, followed by another, public reunion in 2002. In 2003, the band revived the name Clone Records to release the Bizarros' first new studio album in 24 years, Can't Fight Your Way Up Town From Here. They added drummer Martyn Flunoy, who had been playing with Jerry Parkins. Flunoy is still with the band and is Bizarros longest tenured drummer, spending longer with the band than all the other drummers combined.

They stayed out of the studio, although playing live shows frequently, until 2018. In a homage to their first album they released From Akron II along with another Akron band, The Bad Dudes. The band again revived the name Clone Records for the release. A member of the Bad Dudes, Kal Mullens, was also one of the friends who stepped in during Nicholis' departure.

Terry Walker, the Bizarros' second guitarist, keyboard player, and co-songwriter, died of cancer on June 26, 2018. The band has continued to perform as a quartet, although Walker continues to be featured in their marketing.

In 2023, their 1980 single Underground appeared on the compilation Jon Savage's 1980-1982 (The Art of Things t Come). They also appeared with Brian Lisik on the song Blood in Their Eyes on Lisik's 2023 release Nu Wreckard.

== Discography ==
=== Albums ===
- Lady Doubonette (7", Gorilla Records, 1976)
- From Akron (Split LP with the Rubber City Rebels; Clone Records, 1977)
- Laser Boys (7", Clone Records, 1978)
- Bizarros (Mercury, 1979)
- A L'Angle Des Tourments (7", Sordide Sentimental, 1980)
- Can't Fight Your Way Up Town From Here (Clone Records, 2003)
- Complete Collection 1976-1980 (Windian, 2012)
- From Akron II (Split LP with the Bad Dudes; Clone Records, 2018)

=== Compilation appearances ===
- The Akron Compilation (Stiff Records, 1978)
- Bowling Ball II (Clone Records Compilation, 1981)
- Trouser Press Presents the Best Of America Underground (Reachout International Records, 1983)
- England's Dreaming (Trikont, 2004)
- Punk 45: Kill The Hippes! Kill Yourself! The American Nation Destroys its Young-Underground Punk in the United States of America, 1973-1980 Vol.1 (Soul Jazz Records 2013)
- Punk 45: Burn Rubber City Burn! Akron, Ohio : Punk and the Decline of the Mid west 1975-1980 (Soul Jazz Records, 2015)
- Punk 45: Approaching the Minimal With Spray Guns (Soul Jazz Records, 2018)
- Jon Savage's 1980-1982 (The Art of Things t Come).
