= We Became Snakes =

Studio album by Saccharine Trust
- Released: 1986
- Genre: Post-hardcore, jazz fusion, punk jazz
- Length: 37:46
- Label: SST (048)
- Producer: Mike Watt

Saccharine Trust chronology
Worldbroken (1985)	We Became Snakes (1986)	The Sacramental Element (1986)

Professional ratings
Review scores
Source	Rating
Allmusic	4.5/5 stars

We Became Snakes is Saccharine Trust's second album, released in 1986 through SST. It would be their last studio effort until the release of The Great One Is Dead fifteen years later.

== Track listing ==
Side one
No.	Title	Writer(s)	Length
1.	"We Became Snakes"	Baiza, Brewer, Cicero and Fitzer	5:26
2.	"Drugstore Logic"	Baiza, Brewer, Cicero and Fitzer	2:28
3.	"Frankie on a Pony"	Baiza and Brewer	8:51
4.	"The Need"	Baiza and Brewer	2:12

Side two
No.	Title	Writer(s)	Length
1.	"For Her While"	Baiza, Brewer, Cicero and Fitzer	4:36
2.	"Effort to Waste"	Baiza and Brewer	3:30
3.	"The Redeemer"	Baiza, Brewer, Cicero and Fitzer	3:57
4.	"Longing For Ether"	Baiza, Brewer, Cicero, Fitzer and Jacobelly	4:37
5.	"Belonging to October"	Bialik and Cicero	2:36

== Personnel ==
Saccharine Trust

- Joe Baiza – guitar, vocals on "Longing for Ether"
- Jack Brewer – vocals, acoustic guitar on "Belonging to October"
- Tony Cicero – drums
- Bob Fitzer – bass guitar
- Steve Moss – tenor saxophone, harmonica on "Belonging to October"

Additional musicians and production

- Louise Bialik – accordion on "Belonging to October"
- Gary Jacobelly – vocals on "Longing for Ether"
- Ethan James – engineering
- Mike Watt – production; Watt was also self-credited as "Lame Dude" for playing twelve-string acoustic guitar on "Belonging to October", as a joke about his mediocre acoustic guitar skills.
- Paul Roessler – piano on "The Need"
