= Rubber City Rebels =

American punk band

- Origin: Akron, Ohio, United States
- Genres: Punk
- Years active: 1976–present
- Labels: Clone Records, Flaming Orange Records, Capitol Records, White Noise Records, Munster Records, Wizzard in Vinyl
- Members: Rod Firestone; Buzz Clic; Bob Clic; Mike Hammer
- Past members: Donny Damage; Stix Pelton; Pete Sake; Johnny Bethesda; Brandon Matheson; Randy Rice
- Website: http://www.rubbercityrebels.com

Rubber City Rebels are an American punk band from Akron, Ohio, that formed in 1976.

== Early years ==
The original lineup of the band consisted of Rod Firestone (vocals), Buzz Clic (guitar), Donny Damage (bass), Stix Pelton (drums) and Pete Sake (keyboards). Firestone was previously known as "Rod Bent" when he was performing in the band King Cobra at a bar called The Crypt. When he and Clic began playing originals there, the band became the Rubber City Rebels.

In their early years, the Rebels were fans (and friends) of fellow Greater Cleveland-area bands the Dead Boys and Devo. Their breakout show was opening for the Dead Boys at legendary New York City rock club CBGB in 1977. This led to a split album with the Bizarros, titled From Akron, which was released that year and received praise from Robert Christgau. Firestone and Clic would go on to open The Crypt in Akron, at the time, the only punk rock club in the Midwest. Bands including the Dead Boys, Devo, Pere Ubu and the Bizarros played at this club.

The Rebels moved to Los Angeles in 1978, minus Pelton (who was replaced on drums by Mike Hammer) and Sake (keyboards were deemed unnecessary for the band's change to a heavier sound), and gained considerable fame on the Sunset Strip. They frequently headlined at the famous Whisky a Go Go for bands such as the Knack, Fear, the Kats, the Nu Kats, the Dickies and the Plimsouls. The band was signed to Sire Records; however, a clash between band and record label ensued and the recording contract was terminated before the Rebels could record their debut album.

Following some personnel changes (Damage and Hammer left to form the Hammer Damage Band, replaced by Johnny Bethesda and Brandon Matheson, respectively), the Rebels signed a deal with Capitol Records, helped in no small way by Doug Fieger, lead singer of the Knack (who were also signed to Capitol) and a self-professed fan of the band. Matheson and Fieger had previously been members of the Sunset Bombers and had one album released on Ariola Records. The Rebels eponymous debut album was released in 1980. Although praised by critics, sales of the album never vaulted the band past its underground status.

They can be seen near the end of the 1982 movie The Assassination Game, performing "Born Dead" and "Rebel to the Rescue" behind the curtains in the theater. Linda Hamilton's character runs through the crowd at the show, attempting to escape from a pursuer.

In 1983, Firestone released a 12" EP, Trouble, with his band the Firetones.

Eventually the Rebels faded from the scene and ceased touring in 1988, although they never officially disbanded.

== Recent years ==
Despite not touring or recording any new material through the 1990s, the Rebels' reputation and support among fans remained strong and in 2001, Mind Control Laboratories released a remastered Rubber City Rebels which featured improved sound quality and the addition of several bonus tracks. White Noise Records also released Re-Tired that year, a collection of live tracks and the Rebels' half of the From Akron LP. The band toured to support the new releases, featuring a reunion with former members Hammer and Damage.

Boosted by the popularity of their reunion tour and the 2001 releases, the Rebels returned to the studio to record their second album, Pierce My Brain, which was released in 2002. The album track "(I Wanna) Pierce My Brain" was included on the soundtrack for the 2003 skateboarding video game Tony Hawk's Underground.

Although Damage left the band following the first reunion shows, he was quickly replaced by Bob Clic (Buzz's brother and member of the Lewd) who plays on Pierce My Brain. The Rebels still play infrequent shows across the United States and Europe.

== Current lineup ==
- Rod Firestone - vocals
- Buzz Clic - guitar
- Bob Clic - bass
- Mike Hammer - drums

== Discography ==
=== Studio albums ===
- From Akron split LP with The Bizarros (1977, Clone Records)
- Rubber City Rebels (1980, Capitol Records; reissued 2000, Mind Control Labs)
- Pierce My Brain (2002, Munster Records)

=== Singles ===
- "Such a Fool" (1977, Live at the Crypt)
- "Child Eaters" (1977, Live at the Crypt)
- "Young and Dumb" (1980, Flaming Orange Records)
- "Bluer Than Blue" (1980, Capitol Records)
- "Brainwaves" (1981, self-release)
- "Annoyed, Destroyed, Unemployed" (2011, self-release)

=== Compilation albums ===
- Re-Tired (2001, White Noise Records)
- The Akron Years (1977) (2005, Wizzard in Vinyl)
- The Hollywood Years (1979-1984) (2005, Wizzard in Vinyl)

=== Live albums ===
- Live from Akron (2000, Mind Control Labs)

=== Compilation appearances ===
- "Rubber City Rebels" on The Akron Compilation (1978, Stiff Records)
- "Young and Dumb" on L.A. In: A Collection of Los Angeles Rock and New Wave Bands (1979, Rhino Records)
- "Caught in a Dream" on Welcome to Our Nightmare: A Tribute to Alice Cooper (1993, Triple X Records)
