= Paganicons =

EP by Saccharine Trust
- Released: December 10, 1981
- Recorded: April 1981
- Studio: Media Art Studio; Hermosa Beach, California
- Genre: Post-hardcore, punk rock
- Length: 17:42
- Label: SST; SST 006
- Producer: Saccharine Trust, Spot, Mike Watt

Saccharine Trust chronology
Paganicons (1981)	Surviving You, Always (1984)

Paganicons is the debut EP of punk band Saccharine Trust, released on December 10, 1981 through SST.

== Recording ==
Inspired by Minutemen, Saccharine Trust desired to make an album that experimented with different forms of rock. Guitarist Joe Baiza considered music "a conceptual art project".

== Cover art ==
Joe Baiza initially submitted the art for New Alliance Records' compilation Cracks in the Sidewalk but it was rejected by Mike Watt so Baiza used it for Paganicons instead.

== Release and reception ==
Professional ratings
Review scores
Source	Rating
Allmusic	1.5/5 stars

In Journals, Kurt Cobain of Nirvana ranked Paganicons as one of his top fifty records. Allmusic critic John Dougan was less enthusiastic, criticising vocalist Jack Brewer's performance as "especially irritating and pretentious", though further writing that "there are indications that there's an interesting band here, especially in the abrasive guitar playing of Joe Baiza."

== Track listing ==
All tracks are written by Joe Baiza and Jack Brewer.

Side one
No.	Title	Length
1.	"I Have..."	1:56
2.	"Community Lie"	1:25
3.	"Effort to Waste"	2:26
4.	"Mad at the Co."	0:36
5.	"I Am Right"	2:21

Side two
No.	Title	Length
1.	"We Don't Need Freedom"	1:26
2.	"Success and Failure"	1:28
3.	"A Human Certainty"	5:10

== Personnel ==
Saccharine Trust

- Joe Baiza – guitar
- Jack Brewer – vocals
- Rob Holzman – drums
- Earl Liberty – bass guitar

Additional musicians and production

- Jasper Jackson – photography
- Raymond Pettibon – illustrations
- Saccharine Trust – production
- Spot – production, engineering
- Mike Watt – production
