= Jim Sikora =

American filmmaker

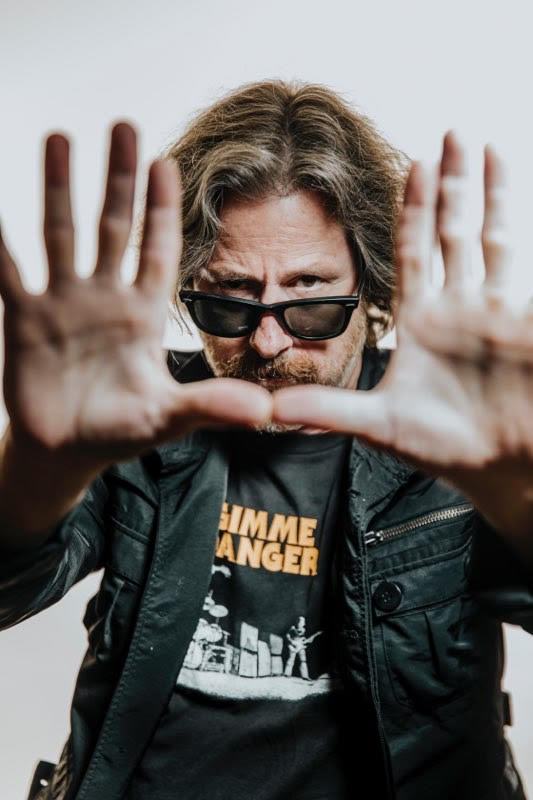
Photo by Jim Luning

Jim Sikora is a Chicago-based American film director, writer, and producer, and early user of DV filmmaking. Sikora is best known for his independent micro-budgeted feature films Walls in the City, Bullet on a Wire, Rock & Roll Punk, and My Charbroiled Burger with Brewer.

== Biography ==
Sikora (born James Vincent Lato III) was raised in Chicago, Illinois, and in the Chicago area. He attended Columbia College Chicago on the G.I. Bill after being honorably discharged from the U.S. Army.

Sikora's films and videos have aired on MTV's 120 Minutes and PBS's Image Union. His film Bullet on a Wire was shown at the Rotterdam International Film Festival, the Munich International Film Festival, and in London at the ICA as part of the American Underground Cinema programming.

He has made music videos and promos for SST Records, Touch & Go, Amphetamine Reptile, Arista, and Rykodisk. The bands he's created videos and promos for include Tar, and Mutts.

Sikora has produced and directed the feature film The Earl, written by playwright Brett Neveu, and The Critics, written by novelist and playwright Adam Langer. His short films include Bring Me The Head of Geraldo Rivera, Stagefright Chameleon, and X-Mass '73.
