= Grizzly Man (soundtrack) =

Soundtrack album by Richard Thompson
- Released: 2005
- Recorded: December 2004
- Studio: Fantasy Studios Berkeley, California
- Genre: Rock
- Label: Cooking Vinyl
- Producer: Henry Kaiser

Richard Thompson chronology
Front Parlour Ballads (2005)	Grizzly Man (2005)	RT - The Life and Music of Richard Thompson (2006)

Professional ratings
Review scores
Source	Rating
AllMusic	3.5/5 stars

Grizzly Man is the soundtrack album, produced by Richard Thompson and released in 2005, from the documentary Grizzly Man.

After the problematic production of the Sweet Talker soundtrack album, Thompson was disinclined to do any more movie soundtracks. However, he relented in this case, agreeing to work with director Werner Herzog whom he respected and with long-time friend and occasional collaborator Henry Kaiser producing the soundtrack.

The soundtrack - with the exception of one song - was recorded in just two days with Thompson and the other musicians largely improvising to specific scenes from the movie whilst Herzog watched from the control room. The one exception was the last track, "Coyotes", a previously recorded performance by Don Edwards. The purchasing of the rights to include that recording accounted for the majority of the soundtrack production budget.

Apart from the Edwards track and one track that features a voice over from Timothy Treadwell's tape diaries, the music is all instrumental.

The album was rereleased (without the Edwards track) in 2022 as Music from Grizzly Man.

== Track listing ==
All songs written by Richard Thompson except where noted.

1. "Tim And The Bears"
2. "Main Title"
3. "Foxes"
4. "Ghosts in the Maze"
5. "Glencoe" (James Scott Skinner, arranged by Thompson)
6. "Parents" (Richard Thompson, Danielle DeGruttola)
7. "Bear Swim" (Richard Thompson, Danielle DeGruttola)
8. "Twilight Cowboy"
9. "The Kibosh" (Richard Thompson, Jim O'Rourke)
10. "Treadwell No More"
11. "Teddy Bear" (Richard Thompson, Danielle DeGruttola)
12. "Small Racket" (Richard Thompson, Jim O'Rourke)
13. "Streamwalk"
14. "That's my Story"
15. "Bear Fight" (Danielle DeGruttola, Damon Smith)
16. "Big Racket" (Richard Thompson, Jim O'Rourke, Henry Kaiser)
17. "Corona For Mr. Chocolate" (Jim O'Rourke)
18. "Main Title Revisited"
19. "Coyotes" (Don Edwards)

== Personnel ==
- Richard Thompson - guitar, bass guitar
- Danielle DeGruttola - cello
- John Hanes - percussion
- Jim O'Rourke - piano, guitar
- Damon Smith - Double bass
- Henry Kaiser - electric guitar on Big Racket.
