= Double Nickels on the Dime =

1984 album by the Minutemen

Studio album by Minutemen
- Released: July 3, 1984
- Recorded: November 1983–April 1984
- Studios: Radio Tokyo, Venice, California
- Genres: Hardcore punk; post-punk; post-hardcore
- Length: 81:01 (original LP) 72:41 (1987 CD reissue) 73:46 (1989 CD reissue)
- Label: SST (028)
- Producer: Ethan James

Minutemen chronology
The Politics of Time (1984)	Double Nickels on the Dime (1984)	Project: Mersh (1985)

Double Nickels on the Dime is the third studio album by American punk rock band Minutemen, released on SST Records in July 1984. A double album containing 45 songs, Double Nickels on the Dime combines elements of punk rock, funk, country, spoken word and jazz, and references a variety of themes, from the Vietnam War and racism in America, to working-class experience and linguistics.

After recording new material, each band member selected songs for different sides of the double album, with the fourth side named "Chaff". Lyrics for several songs on Double Nickels on the Dime were written by friends such as Henry Rollins of Black Flag, Jack Brewer of Saccharine Trust, and SST co-owner Joe Carducci.

Double Nickels on the Dime is seen not only as Minutemen's crowning achievement, but, according to critic Mark Deming, "one of the very best American rock albums of the 1980s". The album now appears on many professional lists of the all-time best rock albums, including Rolling Stone's 500 Greatest Albums of All Time. Slant Magazine listed the album at No. 77 on its list of "Best Albums of the 1980s". Despite this, the full version of the album is only available on vinyl.

== Background ==
Minutemen were formed by guitarist D. Boon and bassist Mike Watt, both from San Pedro, Los Angeles, in 1980. After their previous band, the Reactionaries, disbanded in 1979, the pair continued to write new material and formed the band with drummer Frank Tonche a year later. Minutemen signed to the Californian independent record label SST Records following their second gig. George Hurley, the former drummer of the Reactionaries, replaced Tonche as drummer soon afterwards. The Minutemen were noted in the California punk scene for a philosophy of "jamming econo"; a sense of thriftiness reflected in their touring and presentation. They soon released numerous recordings through SST and their own label, New Alliance Records, while touring with hardcore punk bands like Black Flag and Hüsker Dü.

In January 1983, Minutemen were asked by ex-Blue Cheer keyboardist and local producer Ethan James to contribute a song to Radio Tokyo Tapes, a compilation named after the Californian studio where James worked. The band agreed and contributed three songs to the compilation, with James recording them all for free. These three songs, and another five recorded in May 1983 for a total of $50, were included in their 1983 EP Buzz or Howl Under the Influence of Heat. The band had recorded solely with SST engineer Spot before the recordings. However, they were so impressed by the sessions that they enlisted James to record their next full-length album; Watt later commented: "Ethan, although not knowing us much, tapped right in." After their European tour in mid-1983 with Black Flag, Minutemen entered Radio Tokyo Studios in November to record their next studio album.

== Recording and production ==
Minutemen originally recorded an "album's worth of material" with James in November 1983 in Radio Tokyo Studios. However, after hearing labelmates Hüsker Dü's double album Zen Arcade (1984), which had been recorded a month earlier, Minutemen decided to write more material. Watt later commented: "It wasn't really a competition even. When I wrote 'Take that Hüskers!" in [the album's liner notes] it was acknowledging that they gave us the idea to make a double album." Unlike Hüsker Dü's Zen Arcade, Minutemen did not have a unifying concept when they started the album, but soon decided that the record's concept would be their cars.

The band wrote almost two dozen more songs for a second recording session with James in April 1984. Double Nickels on the Dime was then mixed on a single eight-track in one night by James and cost $1,100 to record. Several songs on the album were recorded elsewhere; a studio-recorded cover of Creedence Clearwater Revival's "Don't Look Now" was replaced with a live version of the song, and according to Watt, "Love Dance" was written at Ian MacKaye's Dischord House.

For sequencing, the band decided that each band member would be allocated a side of the record, an arrangement inspired by Pink Floyd's 1969 double album Ummagumma. The band drew straws to select songs; Hurley won the draw and decided to pick his solo track "You Need the Glory", followed by Boon and Watt. The fourth side of the record was named "Side Chaff", an admission that the songs present were the leftover songs.

== Music and lyrics ==
Watt refers to the album as being the band's art record in the documentary We Jam Econo: The Story of the Minutemen. The songwriting styles of Boon and Watt on Double Nickels on the Dime contrasted. Boon tended to write the band's anthems, and often explored wider political issues. "This Ain't No Picnic" was an example of his approach. Exploring racism and the strife of the working class with both gravity and humor, he composed the song after his supervisor would not let him listen to jazz and soul music on the radio at his day job, calling it "nigger shit".

Watt favored complex and abstract lyrical themes, exemplified by songs such as "The Glory Of Man" and "My Heart and the Real World". Influenced by James Joyce's novel Ulysses (the subject of "June 16th") and the stream of consciousness literary technique in general, Watt's lyrics were often complex and philosophical. On "Take 5, D.", Boon felt that the lyrics were "too spacey". Watt agreed to rewrite the song, adding: "There ain't nothing going to be more real." He found a new set of lyrics: a note from a friend's landlady about a leaking shower.

Double Nickels on the Dime contained several inside jokes that were missed by the band's audience. Watt later remarked: "No one knew what the fuck we were talking about. We'd explain it to people and they'd say, 'I don't get it, what's so funny about that?' And we couldn't tell them because it was our whole angle on the rock & roll, our worldview on the music scene."

== Artwork and packaging ==
The album was named Double Nickels on the Dime as a reaction to the Sammy Hagar song "I Can't Drive 55," a protest against the federally imposed speed limit of 55 miles per hour on all U.S. highways in place at the time. Minutemen decided that driving fast "wasn't terribly defiant"; Watt later commented that "the big rebellion thing was writing your own fuckin' songs and trying to come up with your own story, your own picture, your own book, whatever. So he can't drive 55, because that was the national speed limit? Okay, we'll drive 55, but we'll make crazy music."

The band illustrated the theme on the cover of Double Nickels on the Dime, which depicts Watt driving his Volkswagen Beetle at exactly 55 miles per hour ("double nickels" in trucker slang) traveling southbound through downtown Los Angeles, where Interstate 10 ("The Dime" in trucker slang) meets the San Pedro Intersection of Route 11/110, also known as the Harbor Freeway, toward the band's hometown of San Pedro. "The title means fifty-five miles per hour on the button, like we were Johnny Conservative." Dirk Vandenberg, the band's "buddy/contributor," took photos from the backseat as Watt drove under the sign to San Pedro; it took three circuits of the highway and two days of photography before Minutemen were happy with the cover. Vandenberg later commented on the cover art: "There were three elements that Mike [Watt] wanted in the photo: a natural kind of glint in his eyes reflected in the rearview mirror, the speedometer pinned exactly at 55mph, and, of course, the San Pedro sign guiding us home". However, when the cover was presented to SST, "someone botched the cropping for the print and cut off the end of the word Pedro."

In 2020, Watt revealed that the front cover of the album was also inspired by the cover of Kraftwerk's 1974 album Autobahn.

== Release and promotion ==
SST Records released Double Nickels on the Dime on double vinyl in July 1984. SST delayed the release of Zen Arcade by Hüsker Dü so that both albums could be released simultaneously. After the release of Double Nickels on the Dime, Minutemen toured almost constantly to promote the record. One 1984 tour saw the band playing 57 dates in 63 days. The album sold 15,000 copies during 1984, a respectable amount for a band on an independent record label. As of 2008, Double Nickels on the Dime remains Minutemen's best-selling record.

No singles were released to promote Double Nickels on the Dime, but SST did press a sampler EP that was sent to radio stations. Titled, "Wheels of Fortune," the sampler put nine of the album's "deep cuts" onto one side of a 12" record and featured an etching by Raymond Pettibon on the other. The band also released two videos, "This Ain't No Picnic" and "Ain't Talkin' 'bout Love" (a cover of a song by Van Halen, which the aforementioned Hagar would eventually join), as "flyers". Made for $440, "This Ain't No Picnic" was Minutemen's first video and was later nominated for an MTV award. It features the band playing amidst rubble as a fighter plane "piloted" by Ronald Reagan, edited from public domain footage, fires at them. The video of "Ain't Talkin' 'bout Love", released by SST as a promotional video, was a 40-second recording of a live performance.

In August 1987, Watt and producer Vitus Matare remastered Double Nickels on the Dime for a CD release. To ensure that the CD would be compatible with all players, they omitted all car jams except Boon's, and three songs: "Mr. Robot's Holy Orders", "Ain't Talkin' 'bout Love" and "Little Man With A Gun In His Hand". Watt commented later that the remix was a "nightmare" and "totally worse than the Ethan James mix." Watt reverted to the original mix for a 1989 CD release of Double Nickels on the Dime, but did not include the previously omitted songs. In a January 2006 interview, Watt announced his intention to discuss a remastered full Double Nickels on the Dime CD release with SST owner Greg Ginn.

== Critical reception ==
Professional ratings
Review scores
Source	Rating
AllMusic	5/5 stars
The Boston Phoenix	3.5/4 stars
The Great Rock Discography	8/10
MusicHound Rock	5/5 stars
Pitchfork	9.5/10
Rolling Stone	3.5/5 stars
The Rolling Stone Album Guide	5/5 stars
Spin Alternative Record Guide	10/10
The Village Voice	A−

Upon its release, Double Nickels on the Dime received critical acclaim from a range of American critics; however as a regional independent record label, many of SST's releases did not attract attention from British music magazines. Robert Palmer of The New York Times called the album "more varied musically than any of their earlier disks", adding that the band "think of themselves as town criers, addressing their young constituencies directly with lyrics that apply to the life styles they share, teaching such values as tolerance of cultural, racial and sexual differences". The Village Voice critic Robert Christgau described Boon as a "somewhat limited singer" but "a hell of a reader, with a guitar that rhymes", and remarking "this is poetry-with-jazz as it always should have been". Christgau later said that he underrated the album on its original release. Double Nickels on the Dime placed at number 14 in the publication's end of year Pazz & Jop critics' poll. Reviewing the album in February 1985 for Rolling Stone, David Fricke awarded the album three and a half stars, and also praised Boon's technique, stating: "The telegraphic stutter and almost scientific angularity of singer-guitarist D. Boon's chordings and breakneck solos heighten the jazzier tangents he dares to take," but that "Double Nickels on the Dime's best moments go far too quickly."

Later reviews have also been positive: AllMusic's Mark Deming described Double Nickels on the Dime as a "quantum leap into greatness" for Minutemen, describing the album as "full of striking moments that cohere into a truly remarkable whole" and awarding a full five stars. Journalist Michael Azerrad, profiling Minutemen in his book Our Band Could Be Your Life (titled after a lyric from "History Lesson – Part II"), named Double Nickels on the Dime as "one of the greatest achievements of the indie era" and described it as a "Whitman's sampler of left-wing politics, moving autobiographical vignettes, and twisted Beefheartian twang". Several publications have raised their rating of the album in the years since its release; Rolling Stone re-reviewed Double Nickels on the Dime for the 2004 Album Guide and gave it its classic rating, a full five stars.

== Legacy ==
Although not commercially successful upon its release, Double Nickels on the Dime marked the point at which many punk bands began to ignore the stylistic limitations of the hardcore scene. According to American Hardcore: A Tribal History author Steven Blush, Double Nickels on the Dime was, along with Zen Arcade, "either the pinnacle or downfall of the pure hardcore scene." Watt later commented that Double Nickels on the Dime was the "best album I ever played on."

The album was included in the book 1001 Albums You Must Hear Before You Die. In 2019, the listeners of KEXP-FM ranked it the 223rd greatest album of all time (out of 666).

Accolades for Double Nickels on the Dime
Publication	Country	Accolade	Year	Rank
Blender	U.S.	The 100 Greatest American Albums of All Time	2002	83
Pitchfork	U.S.	Top 100 Albums of the 1980s	2006	17
Pitchfork	U.S.	The 200 Best Albums of the 1980s	2018	52
Pitchfork	U.S.	The 100 Best Indie Rock Albums of All Time	2026	16
Rolling Stone	U.S.	The 500 Greatest Albums of All Time	2012	413
Rolling Stone	U.S.	The 500 Greatest Albums of All Time	2020	267
Rolling Stone	U.S.	40 Greatest Punk Albums of All Time	2016	7
Spin	U.S.	The 25 Greatest Albums of All Time	1989	25
Spin	U.S.	100 Alternative Albums	1995	39
Spin	U.S.	The 50 Most Essential Punk Records	2001	22
Stylus Magazine	U.S.	Top 101-200 Albums of All Time	2004	126
Slant Magazine	U.S.	The 100 Best Albums of the 1980s	2012	77
LA Weekly	U.S.	Top 20 Hardcore Albums in History	2013	6
Fact	U.K.	The 100 Best Albums of the 1980s	2013	29
Paste	U.S.	The 50 Best Post-Punk Albums	2016	32
Paste	U.S.	The 80 Best Albums of the 1980s	2020	43
Revolver	U.S.	50 Greatest Punk Albums of All Time	2018	33
Louder Sound	U.K.	The 50 Best Punk Albums of All Time	2018	40

* designates unordered lists.

The album inspired a collection of comics and drawings entitled Double Nickels Forever. The book features work by 58 artists based on 45 songs from the album. The album was also featured as an entry in Continuum International Publishing Group's 33 1/3 series of books. Michael T. Fournier authored the book which breaks the album down song by song to analyze its creation.

== Track listing ==
=== Original vinyl release ===
Side D.
No.	Title	Writer(s)	Length
1.	"Anxious Mo-Fo"	Mike Watt	1:19
2.	"Theatre Is the Life of You"	D. Boon, Watt	1:30
3.	"Viet Nam"	Boon	1:27
4.	"Cohesion"	Boon	1:55
5.	"It's Expected I'm Gone"	Watt	2:04
6.	"#1 Hit Song"	Boon, George Hurley	1:47
7.	"Two Beads at the End"	Boon, Hurley	1:52
8.	"Do You Want New Wave or Do You Want the Truth?"	Watt	1:49
9.	"Don't Look Now" (Live; Creedence Clearwater Revival cover; Omitted from 1987 CD release)	John Fogerty	1:46
10.	"Shit from an Old Notebook"	Boon, Watt	1:35
11.	"Nature Without Man"	Chuck Dukowski, Boon	1:45
12.	"One Reporter's Opinion"	Watt	1:50
Total length:			20:37

Side Mike
No.	Title	Writer(s)	Length
1.	"Political Song for Michael Jackson to Sing"	Watt	1:33
2.	"Maybe Partying Will Help"	Boon, Watt	1:56
3.	"Toadies"	Watt	1:38
4.	"Retreat"	Watt	2:01
5.	"The Big Foist"	Watt	1:29
6.	"God Bows to Math"	Jack Brewer, Watt	1:15
7.	"Corona"	Boon	2:24
8.	"The Glory of Man"	Watt	2:55
9.	"Take 5, D."	Joe Baiza, John Rocknowski, Dirk Vandenberg, Watt	1:40
10.	"My Heart and the Real World"	Watt	1:05
11.	"History Lesson – Part II"	Watt	2:10
Total length:			20:06

Side George
No.	Title	Writer(s)	Length
1.	"You Need the Glory"	Hurley	2:01
2.	"The Roar of the Masses Could Be Farts"	Vandenberg, Watt	1:20
3.	"Mr. Robot's Holy Orders" (Omitted from all CD and streaming releases)	Hurley, Watt	3:05
4.	"West Germany"	Boon	1:48
5.	"The Politics of Time"	Watt	1:10
6.	"Themselves"	Boon	1:17
7.	"Please Don't Be Gentle with Me"	Jack Brewer, Watt	0:46
8.	"Nothing Indeed"	Hurley, Watt	1:21
9.	"No Exchange"	Hurley, Watt	1:50
10.	"There Ain't Shit on T.V. Tonight"	Hurley, Watt	1:34
11.	"This Ain't No Picnic"	Boon	1:56
12.	"Spillage"	Watt	1:51
Total length:			19:59

Side Chaff
No.	Title	Writer(s)	Length
1.	"Untitled Song for Latin America"	Boon	2:03
2.	"Jesus and Tequila"	Boon, Joe Carducci	2:52
3.	"June 16th"	Watt	1:48
4.	"Storm in My House"	Boon, Henry Rollins	1:57
5.	"Martin's Story"	Martin Tamburovich, Watt	0:51
6.	"Ain't Talkin' 'bout Love" (Van Halen cover; Omitted from all CD and streaming releases)	Eddie Van Halen, Alex Van Halen, David Lee Roth, Michael Anthony	0:40
7.	"Dr. Wu" (Steely Dan cover; Omitted from 1987 CD release)	Donald Fagen, Walter Becker	1:44
8.	"Little Man with a Gun in His Hand" (Omitted from all CD and streaming releases)	Boon, Chuck Dukowski	2:53
9.	"The World According to Nouns"	Watt	2:05
10.	"Love Dance"	Boon	2:00
Total length:			18:53

1987 CD release
No.	Title	Length
1.	"D.'s Car Jam"	0:30
2.	"Anxious Mo-Fo"	1:16
3.	"Theatre Is the Life of You"	1:32
4.	"Viet Nam"	1:32
5.	"Cohesion"	1:57
6.	"It's Expected I'm Gone"	2:06
7.	"#1 Hit Song"	1:50
8.	"Two Beads at the End"	1:54
9.	"Do You Want New Wave or Do You Want the Truth?"	1:55
10.	"Shit from an Old Notebook"	1:39
11.	"Nature Without Man"	1:49
12.	"One Reporter's Opinion"	1:53
13.	"Mike's Car Jam"	0:33
14.	"Political Song for Michael Jackson to Sing"	1:30
15.	"Maybe Partying Will Help"	1:57
16.	"Toadies"	1:42
17.	"Retreat"	2:00
18.	"The Big Foist"	1:30
19.	"God Bows to Math"	1:16
20.	"Corona"	2:34
21.	"The Glory of Man"	2:59
22.	"Take 5, D."	1:41
23.	"My Heart and the Real World"	1:08
24.	"History Lesson – Part II"	2:13
25.	"George's Car Jam"	0:33
26.	"You Need the Glory"	2:43
27.	"The Roar of the Masses Could Be Farts"	1:21
28.	"West Germany"	1:49
29.	"The Politics of Time"	1:08
30.	"Themselves"	1:18
31.	"Please Don't Be Gentle with Me"	0:46
32.	"Nothing Indeed"	1:20
33.	"No Exchange"	1:54
34.	"There Ain't Shit on T.V. Tonight"	1:35
35.	"This Ain't No Picnic"	1:59
36.	"Spillage"	1:48
37.	"Three Car Jam"	0:14
38.	"Untitled Song for Latin America"	2:02
39.	"Jesus and Tequila"	2:56
40.	"June 16th"	1:47
41.	"Storm in My House"	2:02
42.	"Martin's Story"	0:51
43.	"The World According to Nouns"	2:10
44.	"Love Dance"	2:02
Total length:		72:41

1989 CD release
No.	Title	Length
1.	"D.'s Car Jam" / "Anxious Mo-Fo"	1:20
2.	"Theatre Is the Life of You"	1:30
3.	"Viet Nam"	1:29
4.	"Cohesion"	1:56
5.	"It's Expected I'm Gone"	2:05
6.	"#1 Hit Song"	1:49
7.	"Two Beads at the End"	1:53
8.	"Do You Want New Wave or Do You Want the Truth?"	1:50
9.	"Don't Look Now"	1:47
10.	"Shit from an Old Notebook"	1:36
11.	"Nature Without Man"	1:46
12.	"One Reporter's Opinion"	1:51
13.	"Political Song for Michael Jackson to Sing"	1:31
14.	"Maybe Partying Will Help"	1:56
15.	"Toadies"	1:38
16.	"Retreat"	2:00
17.	"The Big Foist"	1:30
18.	"God Bows to Math"	1:16
19.	"Corona"	2:25
20.	"The Glory of Man"	2:57
21.	"Take 5, D."	1:39
22.	"My Heart and the Real World"	1:06
23.	"History Lesson – Part II"	2:12
24.	"You Need the Glory"	2:03
25.	"The Roar of the Masses Could Be Farts"	1:21
26.	"West Germany"	1:49
27.	"The Politics of Time"	1:12
28.	"Themselves"	1:18
29.	"Please Don't Be Gentle with Me"	0:47
30.	"Nothing Indeed"	1:22
31.	"No Exchange"	1:51
32.	"There Ain't Shit on T.V. Tonight"	1:34
33.	"This Ain't No Picnic"	1:57
34.	"Spillage"	1:53
35.	"Untitled Song for Latin America"	2:03
36.	"Jesus and Tequila"	2:53
37.	"June 16th"	1:49
38.	"Storm in My House"	1:59
39.	"Martin's Story"	0:52
40.	"Dr. Wu"	1:45
41.	"The World According to Nouns"	2:07
42.	"Love Dance"	2:02
43.	"Three Car Jam"	0:38
Total length:		73:46

=== Differences ===
All released CD versions omit songs to ensure player compatibility. The tracks removed include "Mr. Robot's Holy Orders", "Ain't Talkin' 'bout Love", "Little Man with a Gun in His Hand", "Don't Look Now" and "Dr. Wu". The 1989 CD release restored the last two songs in place of three of the "car jams".

All online and streaming versions use the 1989 CD track listing.

=== Wheels of Fortune EP ===
One-sided record sent to radio stations to promote Double Nickels on the Dime

1. "Glory of Man"
2. "Nothing Indeed"
3. "Political Song for Michael Jackson to Sing"
4. "History Lesson (Part II)"
5. "Maybe Partying Will Help"
6. "Storm in My House
7. "Jesus and Tequila"
8. "Don't Look Now"
9. "Dr. Wu"

== Personnel ==
All information taken from the 1989 CD release of Double Nickels on the Dime:

Minutemen

- D. Boon – vocals, guitar
- Mike Watt – bass; vocals on "Take 5, D.", "Dr. Wu", and "The Politics of Time"
- George Hurley – drums, vocals

with:

- Joe Baiza – guitar on "Take 5, D."
- John Rocknowski – guitar on "Take 5, D."
- Dirk Vandenberg – guitar on "Take 5, D."
- Ethan James – producer and engineer
