= Universal Congress Of =

American jazz ensemble

- Origin: Los Angeles, California, U.S.
- Genres: Punk jazz
- Years active: 1986–present
- Labels: SST, Enemy, Hazelwood
- Spinoff of: Saccharine Trust
- Members: Joe Baiza; Steve Gaeta; Paul Lines; Steve Moss
- Past members: Jacob Cohn; Rick Cox; Mike Demers; Bob Fitzer; A.P. Gonzalez; Ralph Gorodetsky; Lynn Johnston; Jason Kahn; Paul Uriaz

Universal Congress Of are an American punk jazz ensemble from Los Angeles, formed in 1986 by guitarist-singer Joe Baiza.

== History ==
The project was started by guitarist-vocalist Joe Baiza after his previous group Saccharine Trust went on hiatus. The new ensemble continued to develop the fusion of free jazz and punk rock that Saccharine Trust began to explore before their hiatus. Congress' approach to free jazz has earned them comparisons to Ornette Coleman and James Blood Ulmer, while the group themselves have pointed to Albert Ayler as a primary source of inspiration. The band's name was chosen "to reflect the open-ended nature of its music."

The original line-up consisted of Baiza, Ralph Gorodetsky (bass), Jason Kahn (drums), Steve Moss (saxophone). Moss had played in an earlier incarnation of Saccharine Trust alongside Baiza.

== Legacy ==
In an issue of Mountain Bike, bassist Tim Commerford of Rage Against the Machine spoke of his admiration of the band's funky and jazz tinged style.

== Discography ==
Studio albums

- Joe Baiza & The Universal Congress Of (1987, SST)
- Prosperous and Qualified (1988, SST)
- The Sad and Tragic Demise of Big Fine Hot Salty Black Wind (1991, Enemy)
- The Eleventh-Hour Shine-On (1992, Enemy)

EPs

- This Is Mecolodics (1988, SST)

Live albums

- Sparkling Fresh (1998, Hazelwood)
