= Joe Baiza =

American musician

- Born: January 11, 1952 (age 74); California, United States
- Genres: Punk rock, Jazz
- Occupation: Guitarist
- Instrument: Guitar
- Years active: 1980–present
- Member of: Saccharine Trust, Universal Congress Of, Unknown Instructors

Joe Baiza (born January 11, 1952) is an American guitarist, vocalist and songwriter. Most of Baiza's music touches on a fusion of punk rock and jazz. Eugene Chadbourne cites Baiza as one of the most noteworthy guitarists to emerge from the Southern California punk rock milieu.

== Career ==
Baiza is a founding member of the bands Saccharine Trust, Universal Congress Of, and The Mecolodiacs. He also performed guest guitar spots on several Minutemen tracks and played alongside Black Flag's Greg Ginn and Chuck Dukowski in the SST all-star jam band October Faction, recording two albums with them. Baiza was also part of the musical side project Nastassya Filippovna which featured Bob Lee (drums), Devin Sarno (bass) and Mike Watt (bass). He substituted for Nels Cline during Mike Watt's European and American tours behind his second solo album, Contemplating the Engine Room, in 1997 and 1998. Also in 1997, he and Cline played (sometimes together) in the band Solo Career with Lee (drums), Richard Derrick (bass), Walter Zooi (trumpet) and Gustavo Aguilar (percussion); other guitarists in that rotating ensemble included Mario Lalli, Woody Aplanalp and Ken Rosser. Currently, he is in the reunited Saccharine Trust as well as the improvisational unit Unknown Instructors with former Minutemen Mike Watt and George Hurley.

== Artwork ==
Baiza is also an accomplished visual artist. In 1983 he illustrated the cover of the Minutemen's record Buzz or Howl Under the Influence of Heat. The illustration depicts the faces of D. Boon and Mike Watt engaged in heated dialogue as they so often did as friends and musical collaborators.

In late 2013 The Cornelius Projects in San Pedro hosted The Mind of Joe Baiza – Paintings, Drawings, Photographs & Artifacts.

== Discography ==
Saccharine Trust

- Paganicons (1981, SST) [EP]
- Surviving You, Always (1984, SST)
- Worldbroken (1985, SST)
- We Became Snakes (1986, SST)
- Past Lives (1989, SST)
- The Great One Is Dead (2001, Hazelwood)

Universal Congress Of

- Joe Baiza & The Universal Congress Of (1987, SST)
- This Is Mecolodics (1988, SST) [EP]
- Prosperous and Qualified (1988, SST)
- The Sad and Tragic Demise of Big Fine Hot Salty Black Wind (1991, Enemy)
- The Eleventh-Hour Shine-On (1992, Enemy)
- Sparkling Fresh (1998, Hazelwood)

Mecolodiacs

- Mecolodiacs (1994, Enemy Records)
- Glamjazz (1998, Hazelwood)

Puttanesca

- Puttanesca (2006, Catasonic Records)

Unknown Instructors

- The Way Things Work (2005, Smog Veil Records)
- The Master's Voice (2007, Smog Veil Records)
- Funland (2009, Smog Veil Records)

with Mike Watt

- Contemplating the Engine Room: Live in Long Beach ‘98 – Five Man Opera

Solo

- Prelude to Peace (2017, MINUS ZERO Recordings)
- Two Duos with Jason Kahn and Felix Gebhard (2018, Hangover Central Station)

Guest appearances

- What Makes a Man Start Fires? by Minutemen, songs "Beacon Sighted Through Fog" and "East Wind/Faith" (1983, SST)
- The Politics of Time by Minutemen, song "Tune For Wind God" (1984, New Alliance Records)
- Double Nickels on the Dime by Minutemen, song "Take 5, D." (1984, SST)
- Ball-Hog or Tugboat? by Mike Watt, songs "Drove Up From Pedro" and "Intense Song for Madonna to Sing" (1995, Columbia Records)
- Our Band Could Be Your Life: A Tribute to D Boon and the Minutemen, song "9:30 May 2" (1996, Little Brother Records)
- 1979 by The Reactionaries, song "Innuendo" (2010, Water Under The Bridge Records)
- MOOF by Double Naught Spy Car, song "Hairsuit" (2016)
