= Smog Veil Records =

Independent record label (1991- 2021)

Smog Veil Records was a Chicago, Illinois–based independent record label. In addition to standard CD, DVD, and vinyl distribution, Smog Veil also distributed its media via digital channels, including Napster and iTunes.

== History ==
In business from 1991 until 2021, Smog Veil Records focused primarily on underground, challenging, unknown, or bombastic rock’n’roll from artists based in Northeast Ohio and Cleveland. Co-owner Frank Mauceri stated that the company had a green initiative, and that its headquarters were powered by wind and solar energy. The label closed in December 2021.

== Artists ==
- Agitated
- Amoeba (raft boy)
- Amps 2 Eleven
- Axemaster
- Broke
- Buzz Clic/Bold Chicken
- California Speedbag
- Cheese Borger and The Cleveland Steamers
- David Thomas and Two Pale Boys
- Defnics
- Dissidents
- Face Value
- H.G. Lewis
- Idiot Humans
- Les Black and the Amazing Pink Holes
- Lurid
- New Creatures
- Numbskull
- Offbeats
- The Pagans
- Pere Ubu
- Pink Holes
- Pistol Whip
- Prisoners
- Rocket From The Tombs
- Rubber City Rebels
- Step Sister
- The God Squad
- The New Christs
- The Other Kids
- THOR
- Tin Huey
- Unknown Instructors
- Vacancies
