= Jack Brewer (singer) =

American singer

Joaquin "Jack" Brewer is an American musician known as the singer and lyricist for the Los Angeles post-hardcore band Saccharine Trust which he cofounded with guitarist Joe Baiza.

== Biography ==
Brewer was born in Havana, Cuba in 1958. As a child, his family moved often living in New Orleans, San Pedro, Harbor City, and Wilmington.

Brewer began playing guitar in his early teens His first band was called The Obstacles which played new wave pop. Brewer met Joe Baiza in Wilmington one summer and Baiza began attending band rehearsals. Baiza joined the band as bass player and slowly started moving the band from a pop sound to something more punk. One by one band members left until it was just Brewer and Baiza.

After spending almost a year attempting to put together a new lineup which included a failed audition by Mike Watt, the freshly renamed Saccharine Trust played their first gig in 1980 with Minutemen. The lineup consisted of Baiza on guitar, Brewer on vocals, Luis Maldonado on bass, and Richie Wilder on drums. The band took the name Saccharine Trust from a line in the David Bowie song "The Bewlay Brothers" on Hunky Dory.

Brewers lyrics often featured Biblical imagery and a fascination with Chriatian minister Gene Scott. Brewer's performances have been noted for his "stuttering, enunciated vocals".

Brewer wrote the lyrics for Minutemen's "God Bows to Math" from their Double Nickels on the Dime album.

Saccharine Trust were first active in the early to mid-1980s, after which Brewer formed the Jack Brewer Band and in the 1990s recorded several albums with jazz trio Bazooka. Brewer and Baiza both performed with Unknown Instructors and reformed Saccharine Trust in 1996 and have been active to the present.

Brewer joined Baiza, Watt, and George Hurley (Minutemen) to record vocals for The Way Things Work by experimental rock band Unknown Instructors.

Brewer was one of the subjects, along with Mike Watt, of Jim Sikora's My Char-Broiled Burger With Brewer which Sikora describes as a "portrait of an old and enduring friendship between two musicians—one who is very successful (Mike Watt of the Minutemen and the Stooges) and the other (Jack Brewer of Saccharine Trust) who is sliding into obscurity."
