= List of works by Henry Rollins =

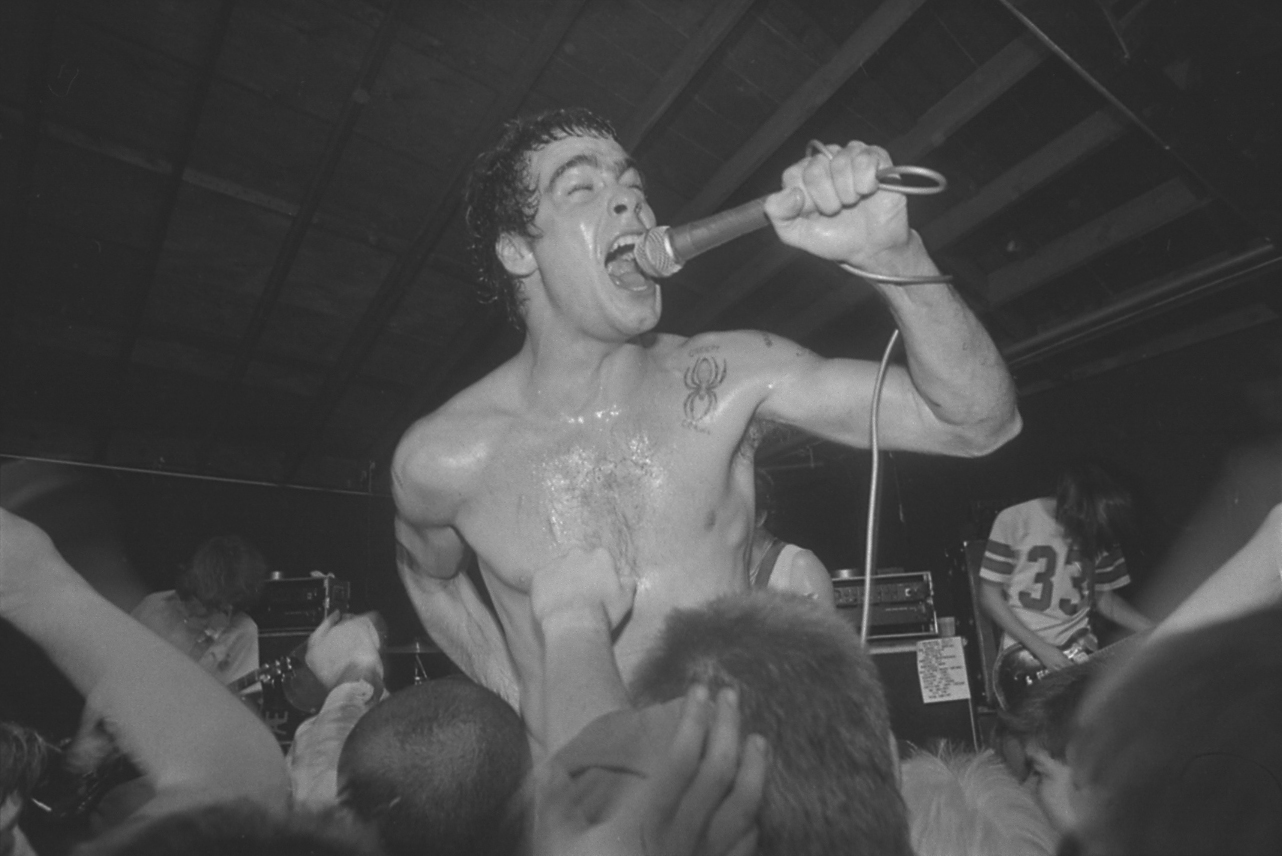
Rollins with Black Flag in 1983

This article describes the works by American vocalist, spoken work performer, writer, and actor Henry Rollins.

== Discography ==
=== Musical releases ===
==== With State of Alert ====
- 1981 No Policy
- 1982 three songs on the sampler Flex Your Head

==== With Black Flag ====
- 1981 Damaged
- 1982 TV Party
- 1984 My War
- 1984 Family Man
- 1984 Slip It In
- 1984 Live '84
- 1985 Loose Nut
- 1985 In My Head
- 1986 Who's Got the 10½?
- 1986 Annihilate This Week
- 1989 I Can See You

==== As Henry Rollins ====
- 1987 Hot Animal Machine
- 1987 Drive by Shooting
- 1987 Live - split album with Dutch band Gore

==== With Rollins Band ====
- 1987 Life Time (re-released in 1999)
- 1989 Hard Volume (re-released in 1999)
- 1990 Turned On
- 1992 The End of Silence (double-CD re-released in 2002)
- 1994 Weight
- 1997 Come In and Burn
- 1999 Insert Band Here
- 2000 A Clockwork Orange Stage
- 2000 Get Some Go Again
- 2001 Nice
- 2002 A Nicer Shade of Red
- 2002 End of Silence Demos
- 2002 The Only Way to Know for Sure: Live in Chicago
- 2002 Rise Above: 24 Black Flag Songs to Benefit the West Memphis Three

==== With Wartime ====
- 1990 Fast Food for Thought

=== Spoken word ===
- 1985 Short Walk on a Long Pier
- 1987 Big Ugly Mouth
- 1989 Sweatbox
- 1990 Live at McCabe's
- 1992 Human Butt
- 1993 The Boxed Life
- 1998 Think Tank
- 1999 Eric the Pilot
- 2001 A Rollins in the Wry
- 2001 Live at the Westbeth Theater
- 2003 Talk Is Cheap: Volume 1
- 2003 Talk Is Cheap: Volume 2
- 2004 Talk Is Cheap: Volume 3
- 2004 Talk Is Cheap: Volume 4
- 2008 Provoked
- 2010 Spoken Word Guy
- 2010 Spoken Word Guy 2

=== Spoken word videos ===
- 1993 Talking from the Box
- 1995 Henry Rollins Goes to London
- 1998 You Saw Me Up There
- 1999 Henry Rollins Live & Ripped in London
- 2001 Up for It
- 2004 Live at Luna Park
- 2004 Shock & Awe: The Tour
- 2005 Live in the Conversation Pit
- 2006 Uncut from NYC
- 2006 Uncut from Israel
- 2007 San Francisco 1990
- 2008 Provoked: Live from Melbourne
- 2009 Uncut From Northern Ireland, South Africa & New Orleans
- 2012 50
- 2018 Keep Talking, Pal.

=== Audio books ===
- 1994 Get in the Van: On the Road with Black Flag
- 1996 Everything
- 1997 Black Coffee Blues
- 2004 Nights Behind the Tree Line
- 2007 World War Z T. Sean Collins

=== Guest appearances and collaborations ===
Song	Artist	Album	Year
Minor Threat's first demo - provided additional vocals (credited as Henry Garfield)	Minor Threat	First Demo Tape EP	1981
"We Are 138"	Misfits	Evilive	1982
"Kick Out the Jams"	Bad Brains	Pump Up the Volume Soundtrack	1990
"Let There Be Rock"	Hard-Ons	Released as a single	1991
"Bottom"	Tool	Undertow	1993
"Wild America"	Iggy Pop	American Caesar	1993
"Sexual Military Dynamics"	Mike Watt	Ball-Hog or Tugboat?	1995
"Delicate Tendrils"	Les Claypool and the Holy Mackerel	Highball with the Devil	1996
"T-4 Strain"	Goldie	Spawn: The Album	1997
"War"	Bone Thugs-n-Harmony, Tom Morello & Flea	Small Soldiers	1998
"Laughing Man (In the Devil Mask)"	Tony Iommi	Iommi	2000
"I Can't Get Behind That"	William Shatner	Has Been	2004
All tracks	The Flaming Lips	The Flaming Lips and Stardeath and White Dwarfs with Henry Rollins and Peaches Doing the Dark Side of the Moon	2009

== Bibliography ==
- 20, 1984, SST Pubs. Art by Raymond Pettibon. 2nd edition included copyright info, booking info, was hand numbered, and included the words "Second Edition," also hand written.
- Two Thirteen Sixty-One, Volume I, March 1985, 2.13.61 Publications/Illiterati Press
- End to End: Two Thirteen Sixty-One, Volume II, 1985, 2.13.61 Publications/Illiterati Press
- Polio Flesh: Two Thirteen Sixty-One, Volume III, 1985, 2.13.61 Publications/Illiterati Press
- You Can't Run From God, 1986, 2.13.61 Publications/Illiterati Press. Limited to 1,000 copies. Never re-printed. No ISBN available.
- Hallucinations of Grandeur, 1986, 2.13.61 Publications/Illiterati Press, ISBN 0-937837-03-2
- Pissing In the Gene Pool, 1987, 2.13.61 Publications, ISBN 1-880985-00-4
- Works, 1988, 2.13.61 Publications. Limited to 2,000 copies.
- Art to Choke Hearts, 1989, 2.13.61 Publications
- 1000 Ways to Die, 1989, 2.13.61 Publications
- Knife Street, 1989, 2.13.61 Publications
- Body Bag, 1989, Creation Press, ISBN 1-871592-04-6. UK Exclusive Compilation of Two Thirteen Sixty-One, End To End, and Polio Flesh.
- The Jackass Theory, 1989 Creation Press, ISBN 1-871592-05-4. UK Exclusive Compilation of 1000 Ways to Die and Knife Street.
- High Adventure In the Great Outdoors, 1990, 2.13.61 Publications, ISBN 1-880985-02-0. US Exclusive Compilation of Two Thirteen Sixty-One, End To End and Polio Flesh.
- Bang!, 1990, 2.13.61 Publications, ISBN 1-880985-03-9. US Exclusive Compilation of 1000 Ways to Die and Knife Street.
- Art to Choke Hearts & Pissing in the Gene Pool: Collected Writing 1985-1987, 1992, 2.13.61 Publications, ISBN 1-880985-10-1
- Black Coffee Blues, 1992, 2.13.61 Publications, ISBN 1-880985-05-5
- See A Grown Man Cry, 1992, 2.13.61 Publications, ISBN 1-880985-12-8
- Now Watch Him Die, 1993, 2.13.61 Publications, ISBN 1-880985-14-4
- One From None, 1993, 2.13.61 Publications, ISBN 1-880985-04-7
- Get In the Van: On the Road With Black Flag, 1994, 2.13.61 Publications, ISBN 1-880985-24-1
- Eye Scream, October 1996, 2.13.61 Publications, ISBN 1-880985-32-2
- See a Grown Man Cry, Now Watch Him Die, August 1997, 2.13.61 Publications, ISBN 1-880985-37-3
- The First Five: Collected Work of Henry Rollins from 1983-1987, October 1997, 2.13.61 Publications, ISBN 1-880985-51-9. Compilation of High Adventure in the Great Outdoors, Pissing in the Gene Pool, Bang!,
- Art To Choke Hearts and One From None
- Solipsist, August 1998, 2.13.61 Publications, ISBN 1-880985-59-4
- The Portable Henry Rollins, February 10, 1998, Villard, ISBN 0-375-75000-2. Contains material from: High Adventure in the Great Outdoors, Art to Choke Hearts, Bang!, Black Coffee Blues, Get In the Van: On the Road with Black Flag, Do I Come Here Often?, Solipsist & previously unpublished material
- Do I Come Here Often? (Black Coffee Blues, Pt. 2), December 1998, 2.13.61 Publications, ISBN 1-880985-61-6 Illustrated by Shannon Wheeler
- Smile, You're Traveling (Black Coffee Blues Part 3), October 2000, 2.13.61 Publications, ISBN 1-880985-69-1
- Unwelcomed Songs, September 2002, 2.13.61 Publications, ISBN 1-880985-71-3
- Broken Summers, November 2003, 2.13.61 Publications, ISBN 1-880985-75-6
- Fanatic! Song Lists and Notes From the Harmony In My Head Radio Show, 2005, 2.13.61 Publications, ISBN 1-880985-78-0
- Roomanitarian, November 2005, 2.13.61 Publications, ISBN 1-880985-77-2
- A Dull Roar: What I Did on My Summer Deracination 2006 , November 2006, 2.13.61 Publications, ISBN 1-880985-79-9
- Fanatic! 2: Song Lists and Notes From the Harmony In My Head Radio Show 2006, November 2007, 2.13.61 Publications
- Fanatic! 3: Song Lists and Notes From the Harmony In My Head Radio Show 2007, 2008, 2.13.61 Publications
- A Preferred Blur: Reflections, Inspections, and Travel in All Directions 2007, 2009, 2.13.61 Publications, ISBN 1-880985-81-0
- A Mad Dash: Introspective Exhortations and Geographical Considerations 2008, 2009, 2.13.61 Publications
- Occupants: Photographs and Writings by Henry Rollins, 2011, Chicago Review Press, ISBN 978-1-56976-815-0
- Before the Chop: LA Weekly Articles 2011-2012, 2013, 2.13.61 Publications ISBN 978-1880985533
- A Grim Detail: Destination Documentation and Multi-Continental Self Examination 2009-2010, 2014, 2.13.61 Publications
- Before the Chop II: LA Weekly Articles 2013-2014, 2015, 2.13.61 Publications
- Before the Chop III: LA Weekly Articles 2014-2016, 2017, 2.13.61 Publications
- Before the Chop IV: LA Weekly Articles (And More) 2012-2018, 2018, 2.13.61 Publications
- Stay Fanatic!!! Vol. 1: Hectic Expectorations For the Music Obsessive, 2019, 2.13.61 Publications
- Stay Fanatic!!! Vol. 2: Jovial Bloviations For the Vinyl Inspired, 2020, 2.13.61 Publications
- Stay Fanatic!!! Vol. 3: Frantic Rants For the Turntable Able, 2022, 2.13.61 Publications
- Sic, December 2022, 2.13.61 Publications
- Stay Fanatic!!! Vol. 4: Lessons in Possession and Confessions of Obsession, 2024, 2.13.61 Publications

== Filmography ==
=== Film ===
Year	Title	Role	Notes
1990	Kiss Napoleon Goodbye	Jackson	
1994	The Chase	Officer Dobbs	
1995	Johnny Mnemonic	Spider	
1995	Heat	Hugh Benny	
1997	Lost Highway	Henry the Guard	
1998	Jack Frost	Sid Gronic	
2000	Desperate but Not Serious	Bartender	
2000	Batman Beyond: Return of the Joker	Bonk (voice)	Direct-to-video
2001	Scenes of the Crime	Greg	
2001	Time Lapse	Gaines	Direct-to-video
2001	Dogtown and Z-Boys	Himself	Documentary
2001	Morgan's Ferry	Monroe	
2002	The New Guy	Warden	
2002	Jackass: The Movie	Himself	Cameo
2002	Psychic Murders	Johnny Miracle	Direct-to-video
2003	Bad Boys II	TNT Leader	
2003	A House on a Hill	Arthur	
2004	Deathdealer: A Documentary	Vincent	
2004	Punk: Attitude	Himself	Documentary
2005	The Alibi	Putty	
2005	We Jam Econo	Himself	Documentary
2005	Feast	Coach	
2006	American Hardcore	Himself	Documentary
2007	Wrong Turn 2: Dead End	Dale Murphy	
2007	Henry Rollins: Uncut From Israel	Himself	Documentary
2008	Henry Rollins: Uncut From New Orleans	Himself	Documentary
2008	Henry Rollins: Uncut From Northern Ireland	Himself	Documentary
2008	Henry Rollins: Uncut From South Africa	Himself	Documentary
2009	The Devil's Tomb	Fulton	
2009	Suck	Rockin' Roger	
2011	Green Lantern: Emerald Knights	Kilowog (voice)	Direct-to-video
2012	In the House of Flies	The Voice	
2015	He Never Died	Jack	
2016	Gutterdammerung	Priest Svengali	
2016	The Last Heist	Bernard	

=== Television ===
Year	Title	Role	Notes
1994	Dennis Miller Live	Himself	Episode: "Anger"
1997	The Doors Legends	Narrator	Television special
1999–2001	Batman Beyond	Mad Stan (voice)	3 episodes
2000	The Human Journey	Narrator	Television special
2001–2002	Night Visions	Himself (Host)	
2002–2003	Full Metal Challenge	Himself (Host)	
2004	The Drew Carey Show	Mr. Jericho	Episode: "Hickory Dickory... Double Date"
2004	Teen Titans	Johnny Rancid (voice)	2 episodes
2004	Henry's Film Corner	Himself (Host)	
2006	Super Robot Monkey Team Hyperforce Go!	Outrageous (voice)	Episode: "The Hills Have Five"
2006–2007	The Henry Rollins Show	Himself (Host)	
2009	Sons of Anarchy	A.J. Weston	10 episodes
2010	Batman: The Brave and the Bold	Robotman (voice)	Episode: "The Last Patrol!"
2010–2016	Adventure Time	Bob Rainicorn, Cookie Man (voice)	3 episodes
2013	Tom Green's House Tonight	Himself	Episode: "Eric André & Henry Rollins"
2014	The Legend of Korra	Zaheer (voice)	13 episodes
2017	Stretch Armstrong and the Flex Fighters	Mickey Simmons, Prison Guard (voice)	Episode: "The Gangs of Old Town"
2018	Keep Talking, Pal	Himself	Television special
2018	Deadly Class	Jürgen Denke	3 episodes
2021	Masters of the Universe: Revelation	Tri-Klops (voice)	4 episodes

=== Video games ===
Year	Title	Role	Notes
2003	Mace Griffin: Bounty Hunter	Mace Griffin	
2004	Def Jam: Fight for NY	Himself	

=== Music videos ===
Year	Title	Role	Notes
1991	"Pop Goes the Weasel" by 3rd Bass	Vanilla Ice	
