= Talk Is Cheap (disambiguation) =

Talk Is Cheap is the 1988 debut solo album by Keith Richards.

Talk Is Cheap may also refer to:

- "Talk Is Cheap" (song), by Chet Faker, 2014
- Talk Is Cheap (EP), by Dave Melillo, 2006
- "Talk Is Cheap", a song by Miley Cyrus from the 2009 EP The Time of Our Lives
- "Talk Is Cheap", a song by Dr. Dog from their self-titled album
- Four volumes of live spoken word albums by Henry Rollins:
  - Talk Is Cheap Vol I (2003)
  - Talk Is Cheap Vol II (2003)
  - Talk Is Cheap Vol III (2004)
  - Talk Is Cheap Vol IV (2004)
