= Live at McCabe's (Henry Rollins album) =

Live @ McCabe's

Live album by Henry Rollins
- Released: 1990
- Recorded: 9 & 10 June 1990 at McCabe's Guitar Shop in Santa Monica, CA
- Genre: Spoken word Comedy
- Length: 76:04
- Label: 2.13.61 (Reissue); Quarterstick Records

Henry Rollins chronology
| Sweatbox (1989) | Live @ McCabe's (1990) | Human Butt (1992) |

Professional ratings
Review scores
| Source | Rating |
|---|---|
| AllMusic | 4.5/5 stars |

Live @ McCabe's is the fourth live spoken word album by Henry Rollins, released in 1990 on Quarterstick Records. It was reissued with new artwork on 2.13.61 Records on January 5, 2009. It was recorded on June 9 & 10, 1990 at McCabe's Guitar Shop in Santa Monica, CA. Exene Cervenka and Hubert Selby Jr. performed with Rollins these two nights.

== Liner Notes ==
On June 9 & 10, 1990, I shared the McCabe's stage with Exene Cervenka and Hubert Selby Jr. As I remember, it was a good time. Thanks for listening.

== Track listing ==
1. Exhaustion – 9:00
2. Misunderstanding – 16:00
3. I Wish Someone Had Told Me – 36:39
4. Travel Tips – 14:28
