= Sweatbox =

Sweatbox (or variations) may refer to:

- Box (torture), also known as a sweatbox, a method of solitary confinement used in humid and arid regions as a method of punishment
- Sweatbox (album), a live, spoken-word album by Henry Rollins
- Sweat box, an animation industry term for rushes or dailies
- The Sweatbox, a documentary about the making of the film The Emperor's New Groove
- Sweatbox, an EP by the Wolfgang Press
