= Ill at Ease =

Ill at Ease may refer to:

- Ill At Ease (Preoccupations album), 2025
- Ill at Ease (The Methadones album), 2001
- Ill at Ease (The Mark of Cain album), 1995
