= Smile, You're Traveling =

Book by Henry Rollins

- First edition cover
- Author: Henry Rollins
- Language: English
- Genre: Travel literature, Journal
- Publisher: 2.13.61
- Publication date: October 1, 2000
- Publication place: United States
- Media type: Print (Paperback)
- Pages: 304
- ISBN: 1-880985-69-1

Smile, You're Traveling (spelled Smile, You're Travelling in the second, British edition) is the third book in the Black Coffee Blues trilogy by Henry Rollins. It includes portions of his travel journal from 1997–1998 which includes personal encounters of spending time with the band Black Sabbath, a vacation to Africa, and trips elsewhere as part of his spoken word tours. It has received a 4.02 rating from approximately 42 reviews at Goodreads.
