= Black Coffee Blues =

Book by Henry Rollins

- Author: Henry Rollins
- Language: English
- Publisher: 2.13.61
- Publication date: 1992 (Album in 1997)
- Publication place: United States
- Media type: Print Paperback; Spoken Word
- Pages: 120
- ISBN: 978-1-880985-55-7
- OCLC: 38203754
- Dewey Decimal: 818/.5409 21
- LC Class: PS3568.O5397 B58 1997

Black Coffee Blues is a book written by Henry Rollins, comprising writings penned between 1989 and 1991. It is composed of seven parts; "124 Worlds", "Invisible Woman Blues", "Exhaustion Blues", "Black Coffee Blues", "Monster", "61 Dreams" and "I Know You". It was published in 1992 by 2.13.61 Publications, Rollins' own publishing house.

Rollins would go on to release two other books with the title: Black Coffee Blue Part 2: Do I Come Here Often? (1996) and Black Coffee Blue Part 3: Smile, You're Traveling (2000).

== Album ==
In 1997, it was released as a spoken word double album with author Henry Rollins narrating with acoustic guitar accompaniment by Chris Haskett, guitarist of Rollins Band.

Black Coffee Blues

Studio album (Audiobook) by Henry Rollins
- Released: 1997
- Genre: Audiobook
- Label: Thirsty Ear
- Producer: Henry Rollins

Henry Rollins chronology
Everything (1996)	Black Coffee Blues (1997)	Think Tank (1998)

Professional ratings
Review scores
Source	Rating
Allmusic	link

== Track listings ==
All tracks written by Chris Haskett and Henry Rollins

=== Disc 1 ===
1. Black Coffee Blues (Brisbane) 13:05
2. Black Coffee Blues (Berlin) 9:11
3. Black Coffee Blues (New York) 9:14
4. Black Coffee Blues (Geneva) 9:10
5. Black Coffee Blues (San Francisco) 9:39
6. Black Coffee Blues (Georgia) 13:48

=== Disc 2 ===
1. Invisible Woman Blues 5:01
2. Monster 20:09
3. Exhaustion Blues 13:14
4. I Know You 5:09

== Critical reception ==
PopMatters, "One senses that there is no small amount of self-loathing percolating beneath Rollins’s assured surface, and if you’re looking for a document to support this theory, look no further than Black Coffee Blues."
