= Get in the Van =

1996 memoir by Henry Rollins

Studio album by Henry Rollins
- Released: 1994
- Genre: Audiobook
- Label: Quarterstick

Henry Rollins chronology
The Boxed Life (1993)	Get in the Van (1994)	Everything (1996)

Get in the Van: On the Road With Black Flag
- Author: Henry Rollins
- Language: English
- Publisher: 2.13.61
- Publication date: 1995
- Publication place: United States
- Media type: Print Paperback; Spoken Word
- Pages: 247
- ISBN: 978-1-880985-24-3
- OCLC: 31955393
- Dewey Decimal: 782.42166/092/2 20
- LC Class: ML421.B56 R65 1994

Professional ratings
Review scores
Source	Rating
Allmusic	4/5 stars

Get in the Van is a memoir by singer, writer and spoken word artist Henry Rollins first published in 1994 by Rollins' own company, 2.13.61 Publications. The book is composed of journal entries that Rollins kept while he was lead singer of the band Black Flag from 1981 to its breakup in 1986. Other text includes recollections of times when he had yet to start, or had lapsed in, his journal-keeping.

The book won a 1996 Firecracker Alternative Book Award. Sections of the book were read and recorded by Rollins and released as a 2-CD set, which won a Grammy in 1995 for Best Spoken Word Album. The tracks are broken up into "1981–1983" and "1984–1986".

== Content ==
The entries begin in the spring of 1981, and document the time surrounding Rollins' personal introduction to and joining of Black Flag. From there, Rollins recounts a string of violent shows, long hours on the road, and abuse by police while immersed in the poverty-stricken bohemian lifestyle the band had maintained. A major part of the writings about 1982 is dedicated to the band's first tour of England, which Rollins paints as a mostly ugly affair. As the narrative continues, Rollins describes the band as being alienated by its audience and how he alienated himself from the band. July 12, 1986 is the final entry. Following it is an afterword by Rollins describing the effects that his experiences with Black Flag had on him and the time immediately following the band's breakup.

Photos are prominent in the book, and include work by Glen E. Friedman, Ed Colver, and Naomi Peterson as well as flyers by Greg Ginn's brother, Raymond Pettibon, and drawings by a member of Black Flag's crew called Davo. The cover photo, taken by Gary Leonard, depicts a squad of Los Angeles police officers marching on a show featuring The Ramones and Black Flag on November 17, 1984. The back cover features a photo taken by Peter Gruchot at a February 19, 1983 show in Berlin, Germany at the SO36 club, depicting everyone—band and crowd—singing along to the song "TV Party" after the PA was turned off.

An appendix of Black Flag line-ups and tour dates, starting with Rollins' joining, is included.

== Second edition ==
A re-issue of the book was made available in late 2004. It includes extra journal entries, artwork and two afterwords, dated 1994 and 2004. One of the afterwords mentions a journal authored by Rollins' friend Joe Cole, who had been murdered when the two were robbed in 1991, and published by 2.13.61 titled Planet Joe which offers an alternate recount of the same dates as the Rollins offering.

Rollins states, in the introduction, that he began work on compiling the book some time in 1990. He also explains that many of the journal entries were written while living in The Shed, a construct in the back yard of Black Flag guitarist Greg Ginn's parents' house.
