= Songs of the Third and Fifth =

Studio album by The Mark of Cain
- Released: November 2012
- Recorded: 2008–2012
- Genre: Alternative metal
- Length: 41:59
- Label: Feel Presents/FUSE Music Group
- Producers: John Scott, Tim Pittman

The Mark of Cain chronology
This is This (2001)	Songs of the Third and Fifth (2012)

Singles from Songs of the Third and Fifth
- 1. "Barkhammer" Released: December 2011; 2. "Heart of Stone" Released: September 2012

Professional ratings
Review scores
Source	Rating
Loud	(97%)

Songs of the Third and Fifth is the fifth full-length studio album by the Australian alternative metal band The Mark of Cain. It was released in November 2012 by Feel Presents and produced by singer Josie Scott and Tim Pittman. Former producer, Henry Rollins contributed vocals to the track "Grey 11". Recorded by Evan James at Broadcast Studio in Adelaide, the album was mixed by Forrester Savell (Karnivool, Dead Letter Circus) and mastered in New York by Tom Coyne (DJ Shadow, The Roots). The Sydney Morning Herald called the album "an outstanding return".

== Track listing ==
1. Barkhammer (3:30)
2. Avenger (4:21)
3. Separatist (4:40)
4. Milosevic (4:37)
5. Eastern Decline (4:51)
6. Grey 11 (feat. Henry Rollins) (4:44)
7. 1000 Yards (6:17)
8. The Argument (5:20)
9. Heart of Stone (3:44)

== Personnel ==
- Josie Scott – guitar, vocals, keyboards
- Kim Scott – bass
- John Stanier – drums, cymbals, percussion

== Charts ==
Chart (2012)	Peak position
Australian Albums (ARIA)	38
