= Big Ugly Mouth =

Live album by Henry Rollins
- Released: 1987
- Recorded: 1987 in Madison, WI, Chicago, IL, Minneapolis, MN, Denver, CO, Los Angeles, CA and New Brunswick, NJ
- Genre: Spoken Word; Comedy
- Length: 70:38
- Label: 2.13.61 (Reissue); Quarterstick Records

Henry Rollins chronology
Short Walk On A Long Pier (1985)	Big Ugly Mouth (1987)	Sweatbox (1989)

Professional ratings
Review scores
Source	Rating
AllMusic	link

Big Ugly Mouth is the second live spoken word album by Henry Rollins, released in 1987 on Quarterstick Records. It was reissued with his first spoken word album, Short Walk On A Long Pier, (1985) and new artwork on 2.13.61 Records in 2005. It was recorded at various tour dates in 1987 at Madison, WI, Chicago, IL, Minneapolis, MN, Denver, CO, Los Angeles, CA and New Brunswick, NJ.

== Track listing ==
1. "Peach" - 8:52
2. "Boy On the Train" - 7:47
3. "Dehumanized" - 5:28
4. "Hiya Handsome" - 4:52
5. "Short Story" - 7:19
6. "Touch and Go" - 8:31
7. "New Age Blues" - 4:48
8. "First Class" - 6:43
9. "Change" - 7:31
10. "New York Story" - 5:45
11. "Joe Cole Phone Sex God" - 3:09

== Credits ==
Rae Di Leo - Engineer
