= The Mark of Cain (band) =

Australian rock band

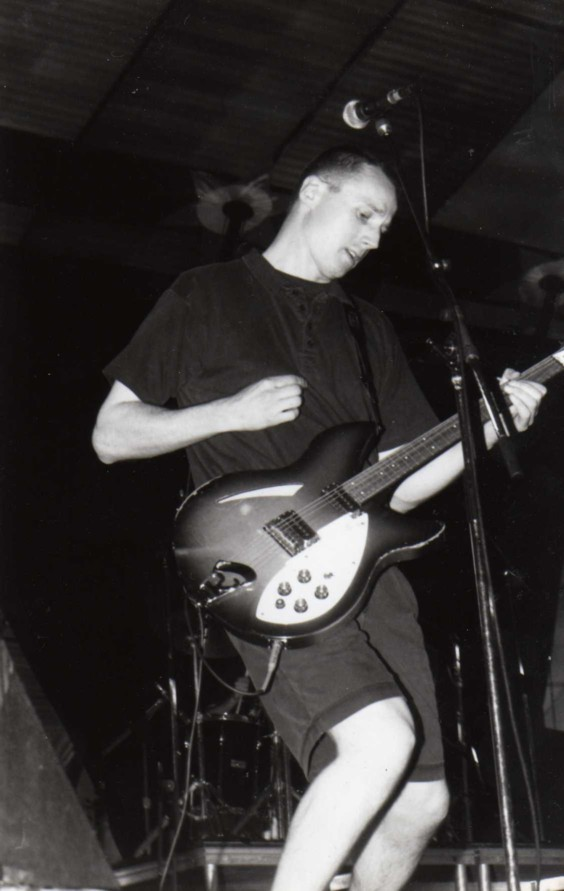
- Josie (then John) Scott performing in Brisbane in October 1995

Background information
- Also known as: TMOC
- Origin: Adelaide, South Australia, Australia
- Genres: Post-hardcore, alternative metal, noise rock
- Years active: 1984–present
- Labels: Phantom, Dominator/Normal, rA/Warner, rA/BMG
- Members: Josie Scott; Kim Scott; Eli Green
- Past members: Rod Archer; Gavin Atchison; Roger Crisp; Aaron Hewson; Campbell Robinson; Stuart Baguley; Neil Guiver; John Rickert; Charles Lockey; John Stanier
- Website: tmoc.com.au

The Mark of Cain (also seen as the initialism TMOC) are an Australian rock band from Adelaide, South Australia. They released their first album, Battlesick, in 1989, following up with The Unclaimed Prize in 1991. Henry Rollins financed and produced their 1995 breakthrough album, Ill at Ease. A compilation album, Rock and Roll, was released in 1996 and The Complete Recordings 88–98 in 1998. These were followed by This Is This... in 2001 and Songs of the Third and Fifth in 2012. They have since undertaken several tours of Australia and played at several festivals.

The Mark of Cain were formed in mid-1984 by siblings Josie (formerly John) Scott (guitar) and Kim Scott (bass), with Rod Archer on vocals and Gavin Atchison playing drums. In 1985, Archer left the group. Josie Scott took on the lead vocal role and the group has remained a trio ever since. The Scotts have been the core of the band, which has featured ten different drummers over the years, including former Helmet member John Stanier between 2001 and 2013. Eli Green stood in for Stanier from 2013 and is playing with them as of 2026. The band continues to write songs and rehearses together, with plans to release more songs.

== History ==
=== 1984–1989: Formation and Battlesick ===
The Mark of Cain were formed as a punk rock group in Adelaide in mid-1984 by Rod Archer on lead vocals; Gavin Atchison on drums (ex-Spiral Collapse); Josie (then John) Scott on guitar (ex-Spiral Collapse), and her younger brother Kim Scott on bass guitar. Their name references the Hermann Hesse novel Demian (1919), which in turn recalls the Genesis story regarding the mark of Cain. Josie had read Demian, which featured "a loner who thought his dark feelings were there for anyone to see as he walked down the street – the Mark of Cain." Atchison and Josie's earlier group, Spiral Collapse, broke up as Josie was concentrating on her university course; she also wanted a "new, harder sound" and disliked that band's lead singer. Josie helped Kim develop his bass guitar skill and met Archer at one of Spiral Collapse's last gigs.

By the end of 1985, Archer had left and Josie Scott added lead vocals to her guitar work. The band replaced Atchison with a succession of drummers: David Graham, Roger Crisp, John Rickert, Neil Guive and then Campbell Robinson by late 1988. During 1987 they supported an Adelaide gig by United States group Big Black during their Australian tour.

The band's first release was a single, "The Lords of Summer", issued on Sydney label Phantom Records in September 1988. It was co-produced by the group with Anthony Bannister and was recorded at Adelaide's Soundtrack Australia studios in January of that year. They covered two tracks by former Phantom groups, "Journey by Sledge" (the Visitors) and "Seein' Double" (Shy Impostors) for a gig give-away album, Assorted Desecrations and Magnificent Mutations (by various artists), in October, to celebrate the label's tenth anniversary. Phantom's owners "had heard something different in the group than what they wanted to deliver, and their progress was periodically interrupted as they kept changing drummers."

The band signed with Adelaide label Dominator Records, which issued their debut album, Battlesick, in August 1989. It was co-produced by Stuart Sheldon and the group, and was recorded at Artec Studios in Adelaide in February and March of that year. Ox Fanzine's Joachim Hiller opined that it "combined gloomy early eighties sounds with brachial, bass-heavy Noiserock."

=== 1990–1995: The Unclaimed Prize and Ill at Ease ===
Their second album, The Unclaimed Prize, was released in March 1991. It was recorded at Artec Sound Vision Productions during January to May 1990. McFarlane felt the album "offered up more sonic blasts of rough-hewn guitar riffs and booming drums."

The Scott siblings each took sabbaticals from the band during 1990 (Josie) and 1991 (Kim) to undertake a "work-related project", including travelling to Chicago. The group reconvened in mid-1992.

Steve Albini (of Big Black) produced their next release, a six-track extended play, Incoming, which was released in June 1993. Albini had met the Scott siblings in 1987 when The Mark of Cain supported his group's tour. The EP was the recording debut for Robinson's replacement, Aaron Hewson (ex-Order of Decay, Grunter), who had joined on drums after the release of The Unclaimed Prize. The tracks were recorded at Artec Studios and Soundtrack and Chicago Recording Studios, from 1988 to 1991.

Early in 1994, the group performed on the Big Day Out tour and in February released a non-album single, "Tell Me", on the Insipid Vinyl label. The Dominator label released their next EP, The Killer Within, in July 1995. The group had supported a run of international visiting groups: Rollins Band, Fugazi, Helmet, Albini's Shellac, Butthole Surfers, Killdozer, All, Pavement and Primus.

In 1995, Dominator issued Battlesick and The Unclaimed Prize as a 2× CD set. Battlesick was also released in the US by Henry Rollins.

Albini's involvement with The Mark of Cain led to Henry Rollins (of Rollins Band) producing the band's 1995 breakthrough album, Ill at Ease. It was recorded at Nesci Studios, Adelaide, in July–August of that year and released in November. Ill at Ease became the band's first release to chart in the ARIA Top 100, peaking at number 73. It gained wide radio support for the group with the national youth broadcaster, Triple J, providing the singles "First Time" and "LMA" with substantial airplay. Tharunka's reviewer opined that "LMA" is "One of the weaker songs on an album that's as heavy and intense as a death in the family. Verging very close to a ballad, 'LMA' displays all the trademark MOC stop/start syncopation at a much reduced tempo, showing that beneath the hard and tough engineering bloke exteriors they have sentimental sides." A national tour followed, after which Hewson left and Campbell Robinson returned. It has often been reported that Rollins helped to finance Ill at Ease but both he and Josie Scott have since categorically denied this.

=== 1996–2007: Rock and Roll and This Is This ===
In December 1996, The Mark of Cain released Rock and Roll, a compilation album of remixes of the group's early material. McFarlane described the work as comprising "off-kilter remixes" of "band favourites." The group contributed two songs to the soundtrack of the Australian feature film Idiot Box (1996): "Hindsight" and a cover version of "Degenerate Boy" (originally by early Australian punk band X). The latter track was issued as a single and was voted at No. 78 on the Triple J Hottest 100, 1997.

Robinson was replaced by Stuart Baguley on drums in late 1998. Baguley was replaced in turn by John Stanier (ex-Helmet, also member of Tomahawk and Battles) in early 2000. He provided the drumming on The Mark of Cain's next album, This Is This, which was co-produced by Andy Gill of Gang of Four, one of The Mark of Cain's early influences, and Phil McKellar (Grinspoon, Regurgitator, The Cruel Sea). It was released by BMG in mid-2001, with the announcement that Stanier was the band's permanent drummer.

Australian rock music journalist Ed Nimmervoll declared it his Album of the Week for 30 June 2001, explaining "With each album they reach deeper into that well of human darkness, trying to finish what they started... [this] album finds the Scott [siblings] linking arms with [Stanier]... The thoughts of the outsider, which have fascinated literature forever and are at the core of rock and roll. When we lose that, rock and roll will be just entertainment."

Jasper Lee of Oz Music Project opined that "[it] sees a more refined anger that is shown in particular by the drumming prowess of new drummer [Stanier], which adds to the intense vocals of [Josie] Scott... the sound on this album is clear and crisp, bringing down the line all the bile and angry bits to be expected of the band with many a reeling, robust audio left hook that blasts the listener through the speakers." This is This peaked at number 26 on the ARIA charts.

=== 2008–2019: Songs of the Third and Fifth and tours ===
The Mark of Cain started recording a new album, Songs of the Third and Fifth, with engineer Evan James at Broadcast Studios in Adelaide in February 2008,. Mixing commenced in December 2010 in Melbourne with Forrester Savell. In December 2011, its lead single, "Barkhammer", was issued and was played on Triple J. A second single, "Heart of Stone", was released in September 2012 and the album appeared on 2 December of that year through Fuse/Feel Presents, earning favourable reviews.

In March 2013, the band toured Australia with Eli Green on drums, standing in for Stanier, who was unable to tour due to his commitments with US band Tomahawk. They completed further tours in 2014 and 2015, also with Green on drums.

In June 2015, the group performed a benefit concert for Rod Archer, their original vocalist, who was undergoing chemotherapy. Archer died on 26 February 2016.

In July 2019, the band announced a national tour to play Battlesick in its entirety for the album's 30th anniversary. A national tour took place in October, and the album was re-released on vinyl. Eli Green played drums on the tour.

=== 2020–present ===
A tour for 2020 marking the 25th anniversary of Ill At Ease was postponed owing to the COVID-19 pandemic. In 2022, the "A Different Kind Of Tension Tour" was announced, starting in August with two shows in Adelaide coinciding with the band's induction into the South Australian Music Hall of Fame. The band also played dates in Melbourne, Sydney, Perth, the Gold Coast and Brisbane. The band played the Ill At Ease songs on tour in 2023–24.

In 2023, The Mark Of Cain announced they would be joining the new Off The Rails one-day mini-fests in NSW in October. The band also announced they would be performing Ill At Ease live as part of The Eighty-Six Festival at the Croxton Bandroom in Melbourne in October. However, due to a bike accident with significant injuries to Kim Scott, all shows in September and October were cancelled.

TMOC performed Ill At Ease live in all states from November 2023 after Kim recovered from his injuries. Eli Green again toured with the band, marking 10 years since joining the band for tour duties. The tour coincided with a deluxe remastered vinyl reissue of the album. A companion piece titled Livid Live '96, a recording of the band's complete 30-minute set from Brisbane's 1996 Livid Festival, remixed by Phil McKellar, was made available as a stand-alone album on vinyl. Both vinyl albums were released on 4 November 2023 in limited numbers.

In 2024, the band continued playing the remaining shows of the Ill At Ease live tour in January and headlined the "Nice Day To Go To The Club" festival in South Australia on 24 February.

In February 2026, the band was continuing to rehearse every Saturday, and has been writing new songs, including a couple written by drummer Eli Green. There are plans to release more songs.

== Style and influences ==
Gang of Four were one of The Mark of Cain's early influences. Australian musicologist Ian McFarlane thought that in the 1990s "the band's influences had broadened to include Sonic Youth, Godflesh and Helmet." Josie Scott has said that she was influenced by The Cure, David Bowie, and people who were "just themselves, people who were loud and proud".

Australian musicologist Ian McFarlane has described the group's sound as "Gloomy, monotonous vocals and bleak slabs of metallic guitar [doing] battle over a lurching rhythm section to arrive at a harsh sound." He also wrote that "the band's penchant for militaristic imagery and lyric themes (to say nothing of the members' close-cropped, marine-styled looks) only added to the sense of desperation and solitude displayed in the band's music." Journalist and musicial Malcolm Sutton wrote in 2026 that they were "A dark and powerful band that uses combat themes in its imagery — yet screams with an expressive intelligence that could start a riot in the right setting".

== Personal lives ==
On 2 February 2026, Josie Scott published a statement on TMOC's Facebook page about her name and gender, saying that she had come out as trans woman and was known to her friends and family as Jo or Josie. She told an ABC radio interviewer that she had known who she was when she was eight or nine years old, but "it was just a matter of what I saw as trying to endure it". She had not even informed her brother Kim, but said that her identity had informed her music, with Ill at Ease describing how she felt. Her announcement was met with supportive comments from fans, other bands, and strangers.

== Recognition and awards ==
Ill at Ease is in Rolling Stone's top 200 Australian albums of all time.

=== AIR Awards ===
The Australian Independent Record Awards (commonly known informally as AIR Awards) is an annual awards night to recognise, promote and celebrate the success of Australia's Independent Music sector.

| Year | Nominee / work | Award | Result |
|---|---|---|---|
| 2013 | Songs of the Third and Fifth | Best Independent Hard Rock or Punk Album | Nominated |

=== ARIA Music Awards ===
The ARIA Music Awards is an annual awards ceremony held by the Australian Recording Industry Association. They commenced in 1987.

| Year | Nominee / work | Award | Result | Ref. |
|---|---|---|---|---|
| 2001 | This is This | Best Rock Album | Nominated | |

=== Fowler's Live Music Awards ===
The Fowler's Live Music Awards took place from 2012 to 2014 to "recognise success and achievement over the past 12 months [and] celebrate the great diversity of original live music" in South Australia. Since 2015 they're known as the South Australian Music Awards.

| Year | Nominee / work | Award | Result (wins only) |
|---|---|---|---|
| 2013 | The Mark of Cain | Best Punk Artist | Won |

=== South Australian Music Hall of Fame ===
The Mark of Cain has been inducted into the SA Music Hall of Fame, joining The Angels, Cold Chisel and The Masters Apprentices as legends of the local music scene.

| Year | Nominee / work | Award | Result (wins only) |
|---|---|---|---|
| 2022 | The Mark of Cain | Hall Of Fame Inductee | Won |

== Discography ==
=== Studio albums ===
| Title | Details | Peak chart positions |
| Title | Details | AUS |
|---|---|---|
| Battlesick | Released: August 1989; Label: Dominator (DOMA006); Format: LP, Cassette | — |
| The Unclaimed Prize | Released: February 1991; Label: Dominator (DOMA010); Format: LP, Cassette | — |
| Ill at Ease | Released: November 1995; Label: rooArt (2068300010); Format: CD | 40 |
| This Is This... | Released: June 2001; Label: rooArt (74321847672); Format: CD | 26 |
| Songs of the Third and Fifth | Released: November 2012; Label: Feel Presents (FEEL 012); Format: CD, LP, digital | 38 |

=== Live albums ===
| Title | Details |
|---|---|
| Attrition | Released: 1988; Label: EC Productions (EC-013); Format: Cassette; Recorded live between 1986–1988 |
| Livid Live '96 | Released: 2023; Label: Cooking Vinyl Australia (CVLP142); Format: Vinyl; Recorded live at Livid Festival in Brisbane, Australia 5 October 1996 |

=== Compilation albums ===
| Title | Details |
|---|---|
| Rock and Roll | Released: December 1996; Label: rooArt (74321447042); Format: CD; Remix compilation |
| The Complete Recordings 88–98 | Released: October 1998; Label: rooArt (TMOCBOX1); Format: 4×CD |

=== Extended plays ===
| Title | Details |
|---|---|
| Incoming | Released: June 1993; Label: Dominator (DOMCD017); Format: CD; Limited to 2500 copies |
| The Killer Is Within | Released: April 1995; Label: Dominator (DOMCD020); Format: CD |

== Singles ==
List of singles, with selected chart positions and certifications
| Title | Year | Peak chart positions | Album |
| Title | Year | AUS | Album |
|---|---|---|---|
| "The Lords of Summer" / "Can You See Now?" (live) | 1988 | — | Attrition |
| "Tell Me" / "Viet Vet" | 1994 | — | |
| "First Time" | 1995 | — | Ill at Ease |
| "LMA" | 1996 | — | Ill at Ease |
| "Highsight" | 1996 | — | The Killer Is Within |
| "Degenerate Boy" | 1997 | 100 | The Idiot Box Film Soundtrack |
| "Interloper" (Who Made Who Remix) | 1997 | 89 | Rock and Roll |
| "[R] Retaliate" | 2000 | 47 | This Is This |
| "Familiar Territory" | 2001 | — | This Is This |
| "Barkhammer" | 2011 | — | Songs of the Third and Fifth |
| "Heart of Stone" | 2012 | — | Songs of the Third and Fifth |
