= A Rollins in the Wry =

Live album by Henry Rollins
- Released: February 27, 2001
- Recorded: March 3 – April 27, 1999, at the Luna Park Club in Los Angeles
- Genre: Spoken word Comedy
- Length: 64:24
- Label: 2.13.61 (Reissue); Quarterstick
- Producer: Henry Rollins; Richard Bishop

Henry Rollins chronology
Eric The Pilot (1999)	A Rollins in the Wry (2001)	Live at the Westbeth Theater (2001)

Professional ratings
Review scores
Source	Rating
AllMusic	link
PopMatters	Favorable) link
Punknews.org	link

A Rollins in the Wry is the ninth spoken word album by Henry Rollins, released February 27, 2001, on Quarterstick Records. It was reissued with new artwork on 2.13.61 Records on September 11, 2007. It was recorded during a nine-week stint at the Luna Park club in Los Angeles. Some recordings used in A Rollins in the Wry, along with others from his shows at Luna Park, were used for his DVD Live at Luna Park (2004).

The last track, Encore, was recorded in London on May 18, 1999. That performance was used for a Comedy Central special called Live and Ripped in London, which first aired August 11, 2000. That special is included as a bonus DVD on Provoked (2008).

== Track listing ==
1. "Intro" – 3:11
2. "Death To Poets" – 0:59
3. "Journal" – 4:17
4. "Clintonese" – 2:03
5. "Language" – 3:25
6. "Never Again" – 3:25
7. "The United Colors of West LA" – 9:20
8. "Rite Aid" – 4:58
9. "Israel" – 8:03
10. "Maturity" – 9:47
11. "Men In Make Up" – 6:06
12. "Future Parents" – 6:38
13. "Encore" – 2:20

== Credits ==
- Henry Rollins – Production & Editing
- Richard Bishop – Production & Management
- Rae Di Leo – Mixing
- Phil Klum – Mastering
- Dave Chapple – Design
- Emek – Illustration
- Alison Dyer – Photography
- Mike Curtis – Tour Manager
