= Provoked (Henry Rollins album) =

Live album by Henry Rollins
- Released: 1 April 2008
- Recorded: CD; 6 November 2007 at the Herbst Theatre in San Francisco, California & 23 January 2008 at The Paradiso in Amsterdam, Netherlands; DVD; 17 & 18 May 1999 at Dingwalls in London, England
- Genre: Spoken word Comedy
- Length: CD: 62:34; DVD: 50:10
- Label: 2.13.61
- Producer: Richard Bishop

Henry Rollins chronology
Talk Is Cheap: Volume 4 (2004)	Provoked (2008)	Spoken Word Guy: 11-03-08 Alexandria VA (2010)

Professional ratings
Review scores
Source	Rating
PunkNews	link

Provoked is the 15th live spoken word album by Henry Rollins, released on April 1, 2008, as a CD/DVD combo on 2.13.61 Records. It was recorded in San Francisco, California on November 6, 2007, and Amsterdam, Netherlands on January 23, 2008, during his Provoked tour.

The DVD includes the Comedy Central special Live and Ripped From London, which was recorded May 17 & 18, 1999 and first aired August 11, 2000. A small portion of this special was included as a bonus track on Rollins' 2001 release, A Rollins In the Wry.

== Track listing ==
=== Disc 1: CD ===
All material written by Henry Rollins.

1. "Sex Ed" – 5:41
2. "Kids" – 5:36
3. "Indie 103 Party" – 6:24
4. "Wide Stance Sitter" – 2:36
5. "Horses" – 3:32
6. "Van Halen" – 14:50
7. "Invasion Force" – 1:49
8. "Mandelaism" – 10:03
9. "Nature’s Wild" – 5:57
10. "Adrian" – 3:38
11. "What I Am" – 2:33

=== Disc 2: DVD ===
1. "Live and Ripped From London" – 50:10
  1. "The Opening Band" – 4:19
  2. "Fans" – 1:23
  3. "Learning A Lesson" – 12:05
  4. "Thailand" – 8:01
  5. "Men & Women" – 5:50
  6. "Tricks" – 4:03
  7. "The School Dance" – 13:39
  8. "End Credits" – 0:51

== Credits ==
=== Disc 1: CD ===
Richard Bishop – Production and Editing
Geoff Barnett – Project Coordination, Additional Production and Editing
Ward McDonald – Recording
Rae Di Leo – Mixing
Jen Murse – Package Design
Keith Jones – Cover Design
Maura Lanahan – Photography

=== Disc 2: DVD ===
Chris Fouracre – Producer
Nikki Parsons – Director
Ray Moore – Senior Cameraman
Bob Mossey – Sound
Reg Wrench – WT Editor
Mike Aiton Browne – Dubbing Mixer
Anna Bonallack – Designer
Lesley Davies – Production Manager
