= Live at the Westbeth Theater =

Live At the Westbeth Theater

Live album by Henry Rollins
- Released: 28 February 2001
- Recorded: 11 December 1999 at the Westbeth Theater in New York, NY
- Genre: Spoken Word; Comedy
- Length: 111:21
- Label: 2.13.61
- Producer: Henry Rollins

Henry Rollins chronology
A Rollins In the Wry (2001)	Live At the Westbeth Theater (2001)	Talk Is Cheap: Volume 1 (2003)

Live At the Westbeth Theater is the tenth live spoken word album by Henry Rollins, released on February 28, 2001 on 2.13.61 Records. It was recorded on December 11, 1999 at the Westbeth Theater in New York City.

== Track listing ==
=== Disc 1 ===
1. "Intro" - 4:01
2. "Canadians Are On the Move!" - 1:58
3. "Jr. Pilot League" - 6:09
4. "Worcester Mass." - 2:10
5. "Mars Needs Aryans" - 8:07
6. "I Smell A Ratt (I)" - 7:44
7. "I Smell A Ratt (II)" - 9:17
8. "I Smell A Ratt (III)" - 10:09
9. "I Smell A Ratt (IV)" - 13:47
10. "I Smell A Ratt (V)" - 3:00

=== Disc 2 ===
1. "Back After the Break" - 0:32
2. "As the Crow Flies" - 5:20
3. "The Undoing of A Man (I)" - 4:10
4. "The Undoing of A Man (II)" - 2:29
5. "The Undoing of A Man (III)" - 5:29
6. "The Undoing of A Man (IV)" - 15:25
7. "The Undoing of A Man (V)" - 11:42

== Credits ==
- Henry Rollins - Production & Editing
- Vance Garcia - Recording
- Rae Di Leo - Editing
- Phil Klum - Mastering
- Dave Chapple - Design
- Frederike de Jonge - Photography
- Richard Bishop - Management
- Mike Curtis - Tour Manager
