= Talk Is Cheap Vol III =

Talk Is Cheap: Volume 3

Live album by Henry Rollins
- Released: 13 January 2004
- Recorded: 23 April 2003 at the Enmore Theatre in Sydney, Australia
- Genre: Spoken word Comedy
- Length: 134:57
- Label: 2.13.61

Henry Rollins chronology
Talk Is Cheap: Volume 2 (2003)	Talk Is Cheap: Volume 3 (2004)	Nights Behind the Tree Line (2004)

Professional ratings
Review scores
Source	Rating
Allmusic	3.5/5 stars

Talk Is Cheap: Volume 3 is the 13th live spoken word album by Henry Rollins, released on January 13, 2004 on 2.13.61 Records. This show was recorded at the Enmore Theater in Sydney, Australia on April 23, 2003, exactly two years after Talk Is Cheap: Volume 1 (2003) was recorded at the same venue.

== Liner Notes ==
The liner notes to "Talk Is Cheap" Volume III start with Rollins jokingly ask whether Sydney is the only place he makes spoken word recordings. No, it isn't; but the Enmore Theatre was the location of "Talk Is Cheap" Volume I and his sound recordist makes high-quality recordings there. Rollins notes that one dollar from each copy bought of "Talk Is Cheap" Volume III will go to Hollygrove Children's Services in Los Angeles, California. Rollins thanks the buyer of the "Talk Is Cheap" series and other CD releases on his 2.13.61 label. Rollins writes, "We have kept the price at ten bucks even in these times of inflation. Why? Because talk is cheap and we're all judged by what we do, not what we say."

== Topics ==
Your Anger Manager

- Growing old and staying angry

War's Greatest Hits Vol. 1

- Complacent college students
- An idiotic letter Henry received
- Henry's manager's children

War's Greatest Hits Vol. 2

- Iraq War
- President George W. Bush
- Muhammad Saeed al-Sahhaf – Iraq's overly optimistic Information Minister during the American invasion in 2003
- Secretary of Defense Donald Rumsfeld

A Love Story

- Clara Harris – a Texas woman who murdered her cheating husband by running him over with a car

The Ramones

- The Ramones' effect on Henry's life

The Hollywood Method

- Henry's experience as a Hollywood actor and landing a role in the 2003 action–comedy film Bad Boys II

== Track listing ==
=== Disc 1 ===
1. "Your Anger Manager" - 15:13
2. "War's Greatest Hits Vol. 1" - 22:53
3. "War's Greatest Hits Vol. 2" - 24:08
4. "A Love Story" - 16:43

=== Disc 2 ===
1. "The Ramones" - 23:38
2. "The Hollywood Method" - 32:22

== Credits ==
- Randy Fransz - Recording
- Rae Di Leo - Mixing
- Dave Chapple - Design
- Mike Curtis - Tour Management
