= Everything (Henry Rollins album) =

Album by Henry Rollins

Studio album by Henry Rollins
- Released: June 18, 1996
- Genre: Audiobook
- Length: 118:19
- Label: Thirsty Ear
- Producer: Alyson Careaga

Henry Rollins chronology
| Get in the Van (1994) | Everything (1996) | Black Coffee Blues (1997) |

Professional ratings
Review scores
| Source | Rating |
|---|---|
| Allmusic | 2.5/5 stars |

Eye Scream
- Author: Henry Rollins
- Language: English
- Publisher: 2.13.61
- Publication date: 1997 (Album in 1996)
- Publication place: United States
- Media type: Print Paperback
- Pages: 219
- ISBN: 978-1-880985-32-8
- OCLC: 35134789

Everything is a 1996 spoken word album by Henry Rollins. Everything is the audiobook of Rollins' book Eye Scream which was written over a period of nine years from 1986 to 1995. Eye Scream covers a number of social issues over that time period including racism, homophobia, and police brutality. The album features Rollins' spoken word accompanied by jazz musicians Charles Gayle and Rashied Ali.

== Track listing ==
1. "Everything" – 12:36
2. "Everything (Continued)" – 12:23
3. "Everything (Continued)" – 13:24
4. "Everything (Continued)" – 12:28
5. "Everything (Continued)" – 12:25
6. "Everything (Continued)" – 12:00
7. "Everything (Continued)" – 9:52
8. "Everything (Continued)" – 9:48
9. "Everything (Continued)" – 8:02
10. "Everything (Continued)" – 15:05

== Personnel ==
- Henry Rollins – vocals, spoken word
- Charles Gayle – violin, saxophone, piano, score, editing
- Rashied Ali – drums, percussion, score, editing
- Juan Bohorquez – editing, dialogue editor
- Alyson Careaga – producer
- Juliette Conroy – photography
- Mark Droescher – design
- Perkin Barnes – engineer
- Yaron – engineer
