= Durch die Nacht mit ... =

- Countries of origin: Germany, France
- Original languages: German, French (sometimes other language with French/German subtitles)
- No. of episodes: 146+

Production
- Running time: 52 minutes

Original release
- Release: 2002 – present

Durch die Nacht mit ... (Into the Night with ...) is a German documentary film television series produced by ZDF for Franco-German television channel ARTE. Locations are mainly in France or Germany.

The title of the French version is Au cœur de la nuit.

Two celebrities spend a filmed evening together. One of them is the host who sets the location and the program. There is no moderator.

In 2010, musician Henry Rollins appeared in an episode of the series with Iranian artist Shirin Neshat.

== See also ==
- List of German television series
