= Barkhammer =

Single by The Mark of Cain

from the album Songs of the Third and Fifth
- Songwriter(s): John Scott, John Stanier

"Barkhammer" is a song by Australian alternative metal band The Mark of Cain. Released on 6 December 2011 as the first single from their fifth studio album Songs of the Third and Fifth. Their first new music to be released in 10-years the single was offered for free download from the band's website for 24-hours prior to its official release.
