= Short Walk on a Long Pier =

- 2006 Reissue cover

Live album by Henry Rollins
- Released: 1988
- Recorded: 1985–1988
- Genre: Spoken word
- Length: 68:02
- Labels: Reissued on Lone Wolf (1989), and 2.13.61 (2006)
- Producers: Henry Rollins; Ratman

Henry Rollins chronology
Short Walk on a Long Pier (1988)	Big Ugly Mouth (1987)

Short Walk On A Long Pier is the first spoken word album released by Henry Rollins. The content is culled from spoken word performances in Los Angeles, San Diego, Baton Rouge, Denver, New York City and Amsterdam. The one piece of music, "Alienation", is performed with Rowland S. Howard of The Birthday Party and Chris Haskett.

Originally, the album was a limited cassette only release of 1000, but it was re-released at least twice. It was first re-released as a vinyl record in 1989 on Lone Wolf Records and again in 2006 on 2.13.61 as a double disc with Big Ugly Mouth. In Rollins' own words, "It's just awful."

== Track listing ==
1. Pre-Show in Holland
2. Standing Still
3. Talking to Fool / Alienation
4. Do It Alone
5. Bus Driver
6. JCC
7. The Balls Are in Your Court
8. What a Gal
9. Be Very Quiet
10. Olivia
11. Madonna
12. Bullshitting with the Friendly Dutch
13. Football
14. Barefoot & Pregnant
15. A Friend to All Women
16. The Cliff
17. It's All Rock and Roll
18. Live on Dutch Radio
