= Talk Is Cheap Vol II =

Talk Is Cheap: Volume 2

Live album by Henry Rollins
- Released: 23 January 2003
- Recorded: 24 April 2001 at the Enmore Theater in Sydney, Australia
- Genre: Spoken word Comedy
- Length: 116:06
- Label: 2.13.61

Henry Rollins chronology
Talk Is Cheap: Volume 1 (2003)	Talk Is Cheap: Volume 2 (2003)	Talk Is Cheap: Volume 3 (2004)

Professional ratings
Review scores
Source	Rating
Allmusic	4/5 stars

Talk Is Cheap: Volume 2 is the 12th live spoken word album by Henry Rollins, released January 23, 2003 on 2.13.61 Records. Talk Is Cheap: Volume 1 was recorded the previous night at the Enmore Theater.

== Topics ==
Spazz Mit Microphone

- Pauline Hanson
- Australia
- TV shows: Big Brother, Survivor, "Surviving Henry"
- Bill Clinton's impeachment
- U.S. Navy submarine commander Scott Waddle - accidentally destroyed a Japanese fishing boat on February 9, 2001, with the USS Greeneville

Happy Birthday

- Growing old
- Nick Cave
- Henry's experience at his first Birthday Party concert in 1983

Early Retirement

- Growing old
- Shifting from boyhood to manhood; girls into women

It's Kiss!

- Henry's experience going to his first Kiss concert in 2000
  - Henry's Kiss-fanatic bandmates
  - San Bernardino, CA
  - The men and women of the Kiss Army
  - Wal-Mart
  - Ted Nugent
- Playing at a music festival in Germany with Macy Gray

The Wisdom of Gene and Paul

- Not burning out as you grow older
- Traveling

India

- Henry's experience visiting India for the first time
- Over-consumption in America & trying to stay low to the ground

== Track listing ==
=== Disc 1 ===
1. "Spazz Mit Microphone" - 12:44
2. "Happy Birthday" - 5:52
3. "Early Retirement" - 18:44
4. "It's Kiss! Pt. 1" - 38:37

=== Disc 2 ===
1. "It's Kiss! Pt. 2" - 29:27
2. "The Wisdom of Gene and Paul" - 4:03
3. "India" - 6:44

== Credits ==
- Randy Fransz - Recording
- Rae Di Leo - Mixing
- Dave Chapple - Design
- Mike Curtis - Tour Management
