= Ill at Ease (The Mark of Cain album) =

Studio album by The Mark of Cain
- Released: November 1995
- Recorded: July – August 1995
- Genre: Alternative metal
- Label: rooArt
- Producer: Henry Rollins

The Mark of Cain chronology
The Unclaimed Prize (1991)	Ill at Ease (1995)	Rock and Roll (1996)

Singles from Ill at Ease
- 1. "First Time" Released: October 1995; 2. "LMA" Released: February 1996

Professional ratings
Review scores
Source	Rating
PyroMusic	9.4/10

Ill at Ease is the third full-length studio album by the Australian alternative metal band The Mark of Cain. It was released in 1995 by Australian label rooArt and produced by Henry Rollins. "First Time" and "LMA" were released as singles from the album. "The Contender", "Interloper", "You Let Me Down", "Hindsight" and "Pointman" were remixed for release on the following album Rock and Roll.

== Reception ==
Andrew McMillen of The Australian said, "At times, the third album by this Adelaide hard rock trio feels like the heaviest set of songs ever recorded, both musically and lyrically. An unrelenting work of precise arrangement and machinelike performance, it grips you from the very first note and doesn't let up for 55 minutes."

== Track listing ==
1. "Interloper" – 4:40
2. "Hindsight" – 5:12
3. "First Time" – 4:05
4. "Remember Me" – 3:53
5. "Point Man" – 7:20
6. "Walk Away" – 4:53
7. "You Let Me Down" – 5:33
8. "Tell Me" – 4:18
9. "The Contender" – 6:01
10. "LMA" – 5:24

== Personnel ==
- Josie Scott – guitar, vocals
- Kim Scott – bass guitar
- Aaron Hewson – drums

== Charts ==
2004 chart performance for Ill at Ease
Chart (2004)	Peak position
Australian Albums (ARIA)	73

2023 chart performance for Ill at Ease
Chart (2023)	Peak position
Australian Albums (ARIA)	40
