= Turned On =

Live album with live tracks by Rollins Band
- Released: 1990
- Recorded: Vienna, Austria on November 27, 1989
- Length: 1:13:30
- Label: Quarterstick Records (CD/2xLP); 2.13.61 Records (Reissue CD)

Rollins Band chronology
Hard Volume (1989)	Turned On (1990)	The End of Silence (1992)

Turned On is a live album from the Rollins Band, fronted by ex-Black Flag singer, Henry Rollins, recorded in Vienna, Austria on November 27, 1989. Even though the album sleeve has the individual tracks listed, the CD is entirely contained in one track.

Professional ratings
Review scores
Source	Rating
Trouser Press	Trouser Press link

== Track listing ==
1. "Lonely" – 4:59
2. "Do It" (Pink Fairies cover) – 2:55
3. "What Have I Got" – 5:42
4. "Tearing" – 5:08
5. "Out There" – 11:37
6. "You Didn't Need" – 5:26
7. "Hard" – 4:20
8. "Followed Around" – 2:46
9. "Mask" – 1:38
10. "Down and Away" – 5:47
11. "Turned Inside Out" – 6:57
12. "The Dietmar Song" – 2:28
13. "Black and White" – 3:31
14. "What Do You Do?" – 6:29
15. "Crazy Lover" (Richard Berry) – 4:44

== Personnel ==
Rollins Band

- Henry Rollins – vocals
- Chris Haskett – guitar
- Andrew Weiss – bass guitar
- Sim Cain – drums
