= Mace Griffin: Bounty Hunter =

2003 video game

- Developer: Warthog Games
- Publisher: Black Label Games: NA: MumboJumbo (PC)
- Platforms: PlayStation 2, Xbox, Windows
- Release: NA: 19 June 2003; EU: 26 September 2003; NA: 7 January 2004 (PC)
- Genre: First-person shooter
- Mode: Single-player

Mace Griffin: Bounty Hunter is a 2003 first-person shooter video game developed by Warthog Games, published by Black Label Games and released for the PlayStation 2, Xbox and Microsoft Windows. A GameCube version was in development, but was cancelled.

== Gameplay ==
One unique feature is the ability to switch between on-foot first-person shooter combat to spacecraft dogfights seamlessly, with no loading times during such moments. This is extended to being able to move away from the controls and walk around during flight as the ship continues on its course. Each weapon also has an alternative fire. For example: the four-barrel shotgun can be fired as a single shot or a burst from all barrels. The semiautomatic pistol can also be fired in a three-round burst or fully automatic.

== Plot ==
The game's plot occurs in the science fiction futuristic Vagner System on the edge of the known universe. The Vagner System is a wild west that is inhabited by large corporations and pioneers looking for a fresh start or to make a quick buck. The backbone of the Vagnerian economy is the large Tannan Corporation, which has a virtual monopoly over the Vagner System. In order to maintain law and order and to protect their interests, a group of large corporations founded the Enforcer police service in the Vagner System. In addition to the Enforcers, the Guild of Bounty Hunters was established.

It develops as a series of missions Mace Griffin (voiced by Henry Rollins) is given while working for the Guild of Bounty Hunters. During these seemingly unrelated missions, Mace discovers a dark conspiracy taking place in the Vagner System involving the appearance of mysterious black wormholes while he is out for his own form of justice: revenge for being thrown into jail years earlier through an act of betrayal. He must seek out and destroy those who have wronged him.

Three different races populate the Vagner System, all settlers from their own home systems. These are humans; the Jaldari, large gorilla-like humanoids; and Valleakan, green lizard-like humanoids. All three races are at peace and mix freely together throughout the universe.

== Development ==
The game was originally announced by publisher Crave Entertainment in April 2001 as Bounty Hunter. It was set to be released as an Xbox console exclusive for a release near the console's release window in the fall. A month later on May 16, a day before E3 2001, Crave announced to enter into a publishing deal with Electronic Arts, where the latter would co-publish three Crave titles for Windows - Freedom Force, Global Ops, and Bounty Hunter, and that Electronic Arts would also solely publish the Xbox version in Europe, and Crave would solely publish the Xbox version in North America.

The fall 2001 release window was missed out, and the two companies would reveal more details for the game in February 2002, set for a fall release window that year.

In April 2002, IGN reported that several retailers had listed a version of the game for the GameCube, which was officially confirmed by Crave on May 10 before E3 2002, in addition to a PlayStation 2 version.

In August, Crave sold the publishing rights to the title to Vivendi Universal Games, who would publish it under the Black Label Games publishing label, and the game was delayed once again to a March 2003 release window to give the game a complete refresh. Electronic Arts was still committed to publish the PC version worldwide after Crave's sale of publishing rights but were removed as publishers in favor of VU Games by May 2003, and the PC version was delayed again until September.

The game went gold on June 2, 2003, and was released for the system on June 19. In August, Vivendi Universal canceled the GameCube version and the North American release of the PC version due to the game's mediocre reception, but they published the PC version in Europe. In December, MumboJumbo acquired the North American publishing rights to the PC version from Vivendi Universal and the publisher released the game the following month in January.

== Reception ==
Reception

Aggregate score
Aggregator	Score		
Aggregator	PC	PS2	Xbox
Metacritic	56/100	62/100	64/100

Review scores
Publication	Score		
Publication	PC	PS2	Xbox
AllGame	N/A	N/A	2.5/5
Edge	N/A	7/10	7/10
Electronic Gaming Monthly	N/A	N/A	5.17/10
Eurogamer	4/10	4/10	4/10
Game Informer	N/A	7.25/10	8/10
GamePro	N/A	2.5/5	3/5
GameRevolution	N/A	C	C
GameSpot	6.6/10	7.2/10	7.2/10
GameSpy	N/A	3/5	3/5
GameZone	N/A	8.2/10	8/10
IGN	6.3/10	6.3/10	6.3/10
Official U.S. PlayStation Magazine	N/A	2/5	N/A
Official Xbox Magazine (US)	N/A	N/A	7.8/10
PC Gamer (UK)	55%	N/A	N/A

The game received "mixed" reviews on all platforms according to review aggregator Metacritic.

== Comic ==
A single prequel comic was released by Image Comics in 2003, telling of the events prior to the game.
