= Sweatbox (album) =

Live album by Henry Rollins
- Released: 1989
- Recorded: 1987–1988 in Washington DC, Los Angeles, CA, Madison, WI, Denver, CO and Budapest, Hungary
- Genre: Spoken Word; Comedy
- Length: 155:35
- Label: Texas Hotel, Quarterstick, 2.13.61

Henry Rollins chronology
Big Ugly Mouth (1987)	Sweatbox (1989)	Live @ McCabe's (1990)

Professional ratings
Review scores
Source	Rating
Allmusic	4/5 stars

Sweatbox is the third live spoken word album by Henry Rollins, released in 1989 on Texas Hotel Records as a 3-LP set, reissued as a double CD and double cassette by Quarterstick Records in 1992, and later reissued on 2.13.61 Records as a double CD in 2005. It was recorded at various tour dates in 1987–1988 in Washington DC, Los Angeles, CA, Madison, WI, Denver, CO, and Budapest, Hungary.

== Liner notes ==
Sweatbox was a low budget, high ambition project. Originally it was a three LP set that I lugged by the box load on early talking tours. Eventually it hit CD on Quarter Stick where it resided happily for many years. Now, we're remastering and re-releasing all the early material on 213, upgrading sonically with ace engineer Phil Klum at the helm and adding tracks when we can.
The previous Sweatbox is missing one track off the original LP. It was recorded in Budapest, Hungary where I was asked to read for some students before the Rollins Band show that night. Anyway, we added it on this version as an extra track at the end of disc 2. If it's too awful for you, you can always just hit stop! At least the set will be slightly more definitive.
Also, it's great to have Phil Klum go over these tapes and do all that can be done to clean them up and even out the levels. Definitely what a re-release should be all about. I hope you like these ancient recordings.

– Henry Rollins

== Track listing ==
Texas Hotel 3-LP set
Side 1

1. 12/19/87 Los Angeles, CA

Side 2

1. 12/19/87 Los Angeles, CA

Side 3

1. 2/13/88 Madison, WI

Side 4

1. 2/23/88 Washington, DC

Side 5

1. 10/17/88 Budapest, Hungary
2. 2/6/88 Denver, CO
3. 8/27/88 Santa Monica, CA
4. 12/19/87 Los Angeles, CA

Side 6

1. 1/20/88 Los Angeles, CA
2. 2/12/88 Chicago, IL

Quarterstick 2-CD/2-cassette and 2.13.61 2-CD reissues
CD/Cassette 1

1. "Getting Home" - 7:16
2. "Riding the Bus" - 6:25
3. "Fun With Letterman" - 2:50
4. "Santa Cruz Pig" - 6:36
5. "Friction Pt. 1" - 14:09
6. "Friction Pt. 2" - 13:41
7. "Tough Guys Talk Dirty" - 15:29
8. "Short Story" - 5:30
9. "Hack Writer" - 4:40

CD/Cassette 2

1. "Running, Crawling" - 23:10
2. "Sex Ed." - 13:52
3. "Blueprints For Destruction of Earth" - 14:37
4. "Mekanik" - 3:41
5. "Late Night Phone Blues" - 4:40
6. "Untouchable" - 7:35
7. "My Little Friend" - 11:27

CD 2, track 7 is not on the Quarterstick release, and CD 1, track 5 is erroneously unlisted on the Quarterstick 2-CD set.

== Credits ==
- Rae Di Leo - Edit Engineering
- Phil Klum - Tape Transfer & Mastering (2.13.61 reissue)
