= Henry Rollins =

American musician (born 1961)

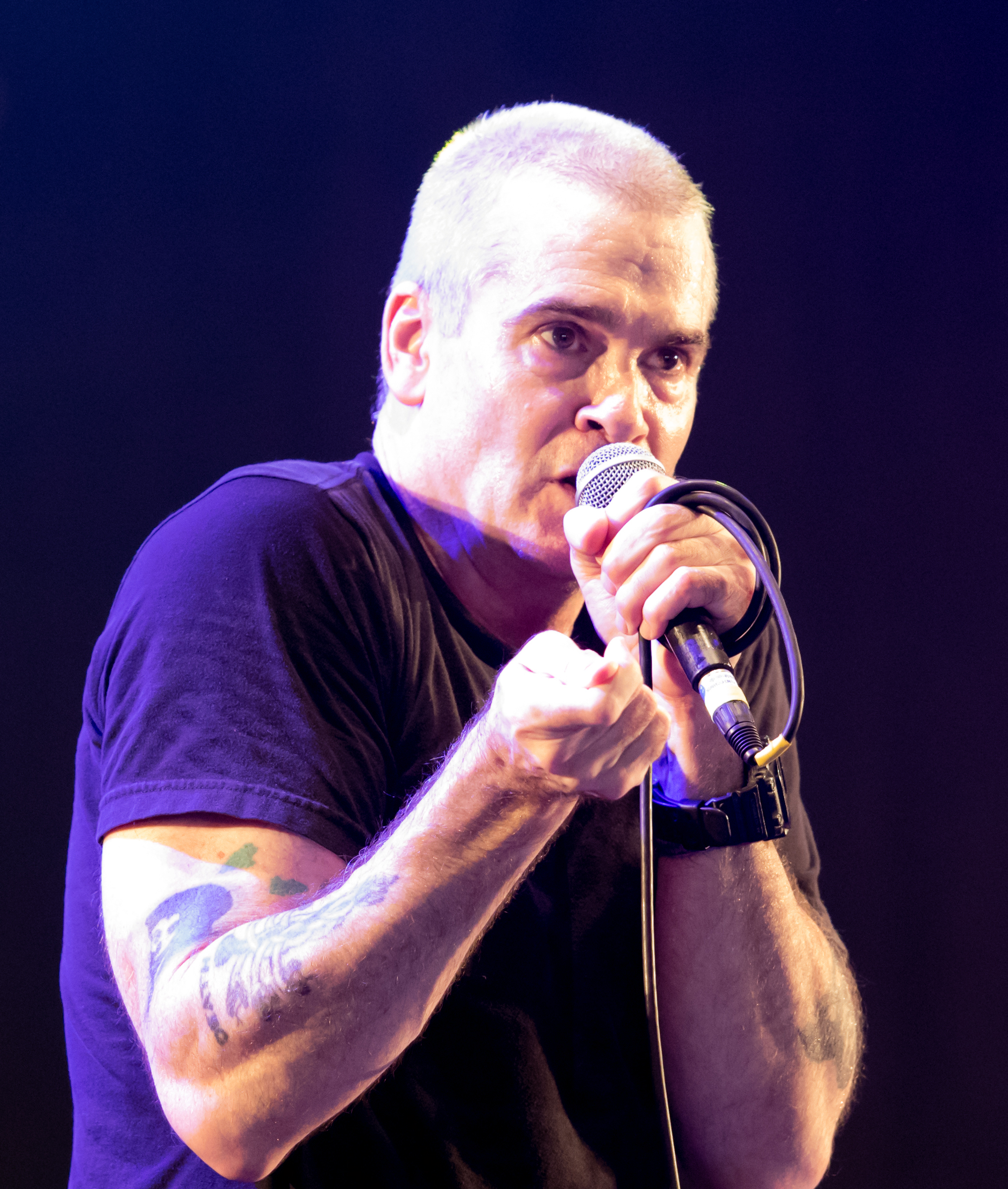
- Rollins at Wacken Open Air 2016

Background information
- Born: Henry Lawrence Garfield; February 13, 1961 (age 65); Washington, D.C., U.S.
- Genres: Hardcore punk; alternative metal; spoken word
- Occupations: Singer; writer; actor; speaker; presenter; author; comedian; activist
- Works: Full list of works
- Years active: 1980–present
- Label: 2.13.61
- Formerly of: Black Flag; Rollins Band; State of Alert
- Website: henryrollins.com

Henry Lawrence Garfield (born February 13, 1961), known professionally as Henry Rollins, is an American singer, writer, spoken word artist, actor, comedian, and presenter. After performing in the short-lived hardcore punk band State of Alert in 1980, Rollins fronted the California hardcore band Black Flag from 1981 to 1986. Following the band's breakup, he established the record label and publishing company 2.13.61 to release his spoken word albums, and formed the Rollins Band, which toured with a number of lineups from 1987 to 2003 and in 2006.

Rollins has hosted numerous radio shows, such as Harmony in My Head on Indie 103, and television shows such as The Henry Rollins Show and 120 Minutes. He had recurring dramatic roles in the second season of Sons of Anarchy as A.J. Weston, in the final two seasons of the animated series The Legend of Korra as Zaheer, and has also had roles in several films. He has campaigned for various political causes in the United States, including the promotion of gay rights, World Hunger Relief, the West Memphis Three, and an end to all war. He currently hosts a weekly radio show on KCRW, is a regular columnist for Rolling Stone Australia, and was a regular columnist for LA Weekly.

== Early life ==
Rollins was born Henry Lawrence Garfield in Washington, D.C., on February 13, 1961, the only child of Iris and Paul Garfield. His mother is of Irish descent, and his father was from a Jewish family. Rollins's paternal great-grandfather, Henach Luban, fled to the U.S. from Rēzekne, Latvia (then part of the Russian Empire), and changed his first name to Henry. When Rollins was three years old, his parents divorced and he was raised by his mother in the Washington neighborhood of Glover Park. As a child and teenager, Rollins was sexually assaulted, and he suffered from depression and low self-esteem. In fourth grade, he was diagnosed with hyperactivity, and was prescribed Ritalin for several years to focus during school.

Rollins attended The Bullis School, then an all-male preparatory school in Potomac, Maryland. According to Rollins, the school helped him to develop a sense of discipline and a strong work ethic. It was at Bullis that he began writing. After high school, he attended American University in Washington for one semester, but dropped out in December 1979. He began working minimum-wage jobs, including a job as a courier for kidney samples at the National Institutes of Health. In 1987, he said that he had not seen his father since the age of 18, and in 2019 he wrote, "What my father thinks of me, or if he is still alive, I have no idea." A photograph of Rollins' father was used on the 1988 vinyl pressing of his 1987 spoken word album Short Walk on a Long Pier.

== Music career ==
=== State of Alert ===
Initially into hard rock acts like Van Halen and Ted Nugent, Rollins soon developed an interest in punk with his friend Ian MacKaye.

"We wanted something that just kicked ass," he says. "Then one of us, probably Ian, got the Sex Pistols record. I remember hearing that and thinking 'Well, that's something. This guy is pissed off, those guitars are rude.' What a revelation!"

From 1979 to 1980, Rollins was working as a roadie for D.C. bands, including Teen Idles. When the band's singer, Nathan Strejcek, failed to appear for practice sessions, Rollins convinced the Teen Idles to let him sing. Word of Rollins's ability spread around the punk rock scene in Washington D.C.; Bad Brains singer H.R. would sometimes have Rollins on stage to sing with him. In 1980, the Washington punk band the Extorts lost their frontman Lyle Preslar to Minor Threat. Rollins joined the other members of the band and formed State of Alert (S.O.A.) and became its frontman and vocalist. He put words to the band's five songs and wrote several more. S.O.A. recorded their sole EP, No Policy, and released it in 1981 on MacKaye's Dischord Records.

Around April 1981, drummer Simon Jacobsen was replaced by Ivor Hanson. At the time, Hanson's father was a top admiral in the U.S. Navy and his family shared living quarters with the U.S. vice president at the Naval Observatory. The band held their practices there and would have to be let in by Secret Service agents.

S.O.A. disbanded after a total of a dozen concerts and one EP. Rollins had enjoyed being the band's frontman, and had earned a reputation for fighting in shows. He later said, "I was like nineteen and a young man all full of steam and loved to get in the dust-ups." By this time, Rollins had become the assistant manager of the Georgetown Häagen-Dazs ice cream store; his steady employment had helped to finance the S.O.A. EP.

=== Black Flag ===
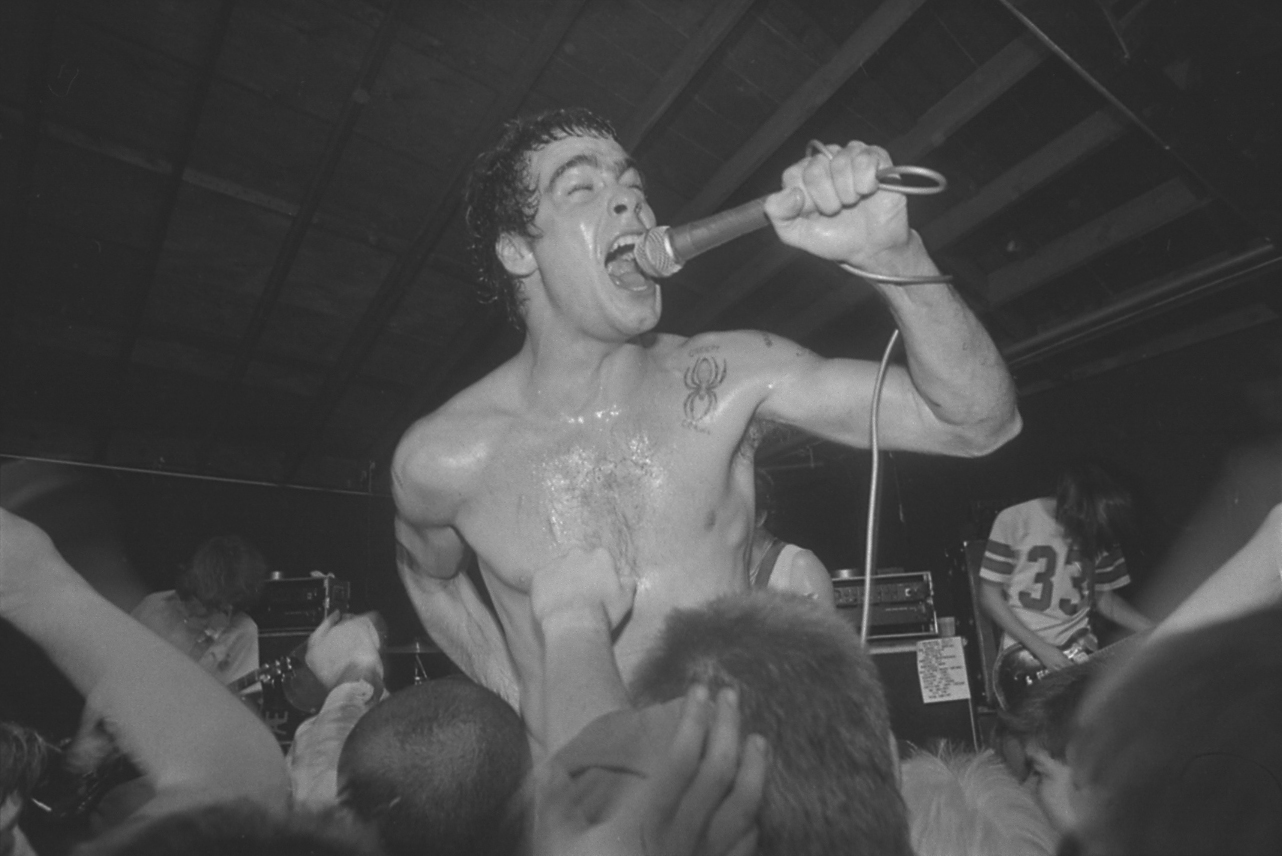
Rollins with Black Flag in 1983

In 1980, a friend gave Rollins and MacKaye a copy of Black Flag's Nervous Breakdown EP. Rollins soon became a fan of the band, exchanging letters with bassist Chuck Dukowski and later inviting the band to stay in his parents' home when Black Flag toured the East Coast in December 1980. When Black Flag returned to the East Coast in 1981, Rollins attended as many of their concerts as he could. At an impromptu show in a New York bar, Black Flag's vocalist Dez Cadena allowed Rollins to sing "Clocked In", a song Rollins had asked the band to play in light of the fact that he had to drive back to Washington, D.C., to begin work.

Unbeknownst to Rollins, Cadena wanted to switch to guitar, and the band was looking for a new vocalist. The band was impressed with Rollins's singing and stage demeanor, and the next day, after a semi-formal audition at Tu Casa Studio in New York City, they asked him to become their permanent vocalist. Despite some doubts, he accepted, in part because of MacKaye's encouragement. His high level of energy and intense personality suited the band's style, but Rollins's diverse tastes in music were a key factor in his being selected as singer; Black Flag's founder Greg Ginn was growing restless creatively and wanted a singer who was willing to move beyond simple, three-chord punk.

After joining Black Flag in 1981, Rollins quit his job at Häagen-Dazs, sold his car, and moved to Los Angeles. Upon arriving in Los Angeles, Rollins got the Black Flag logo tattooed on his left biceps and on the back of his neck, and chose the stage name of Rollins, a surname he and MacKaye had used as teenagers. Rollins played his first show with Black Flag on July 25, 1981, at Cuckoo's Nest in Costa Mesa, California. Rollins was in a different environment in Los Angeles; the police soon realized he was a member of Black Flag, and he was hassled as a result. Rollins later said: "That really scared me. It freaked me out that an adult would do that. ... My little eyes were opened big time."

Before concerts, as the others of the band tuned up, Rollins would stride about the stage dressed only in a pair of black shorts, grinding his teeth; to focus before the show, he would squeeze a pool ball. His stage persona impressed several critics; after a 1982 show in Anacortes, Washington, Sub Pop critic Calvin Johnson wrote: "Henry was incredible. Pacing back and forth, lunging, lurching, growling; it was all real, the most intense emotional experiences I have ever seen."

By 1983, Rollins's stage persona was increasingly alienating him from the rest of Black Flag. During a show in England, Rollins assaulted a member of the audience who attacked Ginn; Ginn later scolded Rollins, calling him a "macho asshole". A legal dispute with Unicorn Records held up further Black Flag releases until 1984, and Ginn was slowing the band's tempo down so that they would remain innovative. In August 1983, guitarist Dez Cadena had left the band; a stalemate lingered between Dukowski and Ginn, who wanted Dukowski to leave, before Ginn fired Dukowski outright. 1984's heavy metal music-influenced My War featured Rollins screaming and wailing throughout many of the songs; the band's members also grew their hair to confuse the band's hardcore punk audience.

Black Flag's change in musical style and appearance alienated many of their original fans, who focused their displeasure on Rollins by punching him in the mouth, stabbing him with pens, or scratching him with their nails, among other things. He often fought back, frequently dragging audience members on stage and assaulting them. During a Black Flag concert, Rollins repeatedly punched a fan in the face who had continuously reached for his microphone. Rollins became increasingly alienated from the audience; in his tour diary, Rollins wrote "When they spit at me, when they grab at me, they aren't hurting me. When I push out and mangle the flesh of another, it's falling so short of what I really want to do to them." During the Unicorn legal dispute, Rollins had started a weight-lifting program, and by their 1984 tours, he had become visibly well-built; journalist Michael Azerrad later commented that "his powerful physique was a metaphor for the impregnable emotional shield he was developing around himself." Rollins has since replied that "no, the training was just basically a way to push myself."

=== Rollins Band, solo releases, and spoken word ===
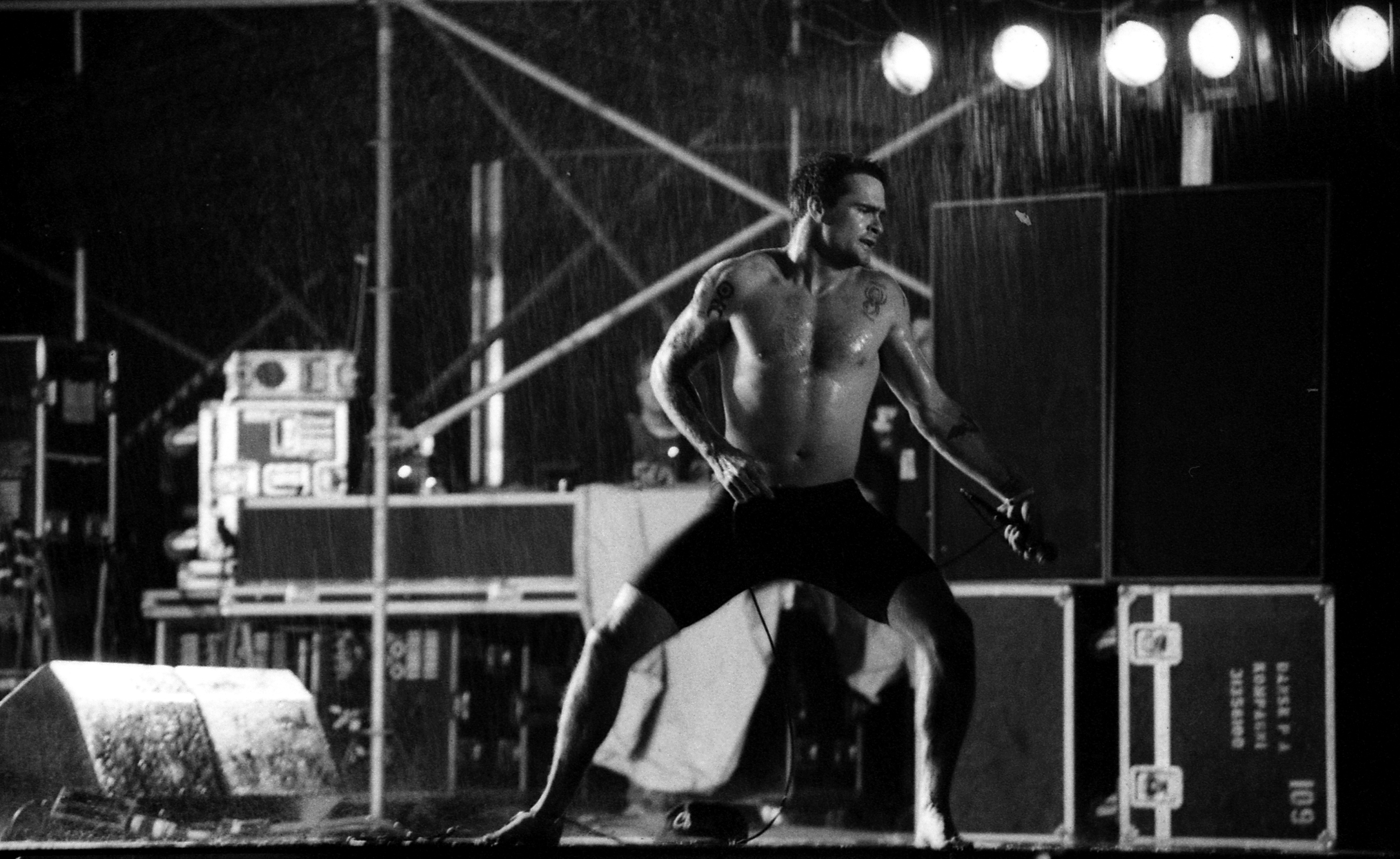
Rollins performing with the Rollins Band in 1993

Before Black Flag disbanded in August 1986, Rollins had already toured as a solo spoken-word artist. He released two solo records in 1987, Hot Animal Machine, a collaboration with guitarist Chris Haskett, and Drive by Shooting, recorded as "Henrietta Collins and the Wifebeating Childhaters"; Rollins also released his second spoken word album, Big Ugly Mouth, in the same year. Along with Haskett, Rollins soon added Andrew Weiss and Sim Cain, both former members of Ginn's side-project Gone, and called the new group Rollins Band. The band toured relentlessly, and their 1987 debut album, Life Time, was quickly followed by the outtakes and live collection Do It. The band continued to tour throughout 1988; in 1989 another Rollins Band album, Hard Volume, was released. Another live album, Turned On, and another spoken word release, Live at McCabe's, followed in 1990.

In 1991, the Rollins Band signed a distribution deal with Imago Records and appeared at the Lollapalooza festival; both improved the band's presence. However, in December 1991, Rollins and his best friend Joe Cole were accosted by two armed robbers outside Rollins's home. Cole was murdered by a gunshot to the head; Rollins escaped without injury but police suspected him in the murder and detained him for ten hours. Although traumatized by Cole's death, as chronicled in his book Now Watch Him Die, Rollins continued to release new material; the spoken-word album Human Butt appeared in 1992 on his own record label, 2.13.61. The Rollins Band released The End of Silence, Rollins's first charting album.

The following year, Rollins released a spoken-word double album, The Boxed Life. The Rollins Band embarked upon the End of Silence tour; bassist Weiss was fired toward its end, and replaced by funk and jazz bassist Melvin Gibbs. According to critic Steve Huey, 1994 was Rollins's "breakout year". The Rollins Band appeared at Woodstock 94 and released Weight, which ranked on the Billboard Top 40. Rollins released Get in the Van: On the Road with Black Flag, a double-disc set of him reading from his Black Flag tour diary of the same name; he won the Grammy for Best Spoken Word Recording as a result. Rollins was named 1994's "Man of the Year" by the American men's magazine Details and became a contributing columnist to the magazine. With the increased exposure, Rollins made several appearances on American music channels MTV and VH1 around this time, and made his Hollywood film debut in 1994 in The Chase playing a police officer.

In 1995, the Rollins Band's record label, Imago Records, declared itself bankrupt. Rollins began focusing on his spoken word career. He released Everything, a recording of a chapter of his book Eye Scream with free jazz backing, in 1996. He continued to appear in various films, including Heat, Johnny Mnemonic and Lost Highway. The Rollins Band signed to DreamWorks Records in 1997 and soon released Come In and Burn, but it did not receive as much critical acclaim as their previous material. Rollins continued to release spoken-word book readings, releasing Black Coffee Blues in the same year. In 1998, Rollins released Think Tank, his first set of non-book-related spoken material in five years.

By 1998, Rollins felt that the relationship with his backing band had run its course, and the line-up disbanded. He had produced a Los Angeles hard rock band called Mother Superior, and invited them to form a new incarnation of the Rollins Band. Their first album, Get Some Go Again, was released two years later. The Rollins Band released several more albums, including 2001's Nice and 2003's Rise Above: 24 Black Flag Songs to Benefit the West Memphis Three. After 2003, the band became inactive as Rollins focused on radio and television work. During a 2006 appearance on Tom Green Live!, Rollins stated that he "may never do music again", a feeling which he reiterated in 2011 when talking to Trebuchet magazine. In an interview with Culture Brats, Rollins admitted he had sworn off music for good – "... and I must say that I miss it every day. I just don't know honestly what I could do with it that's different."

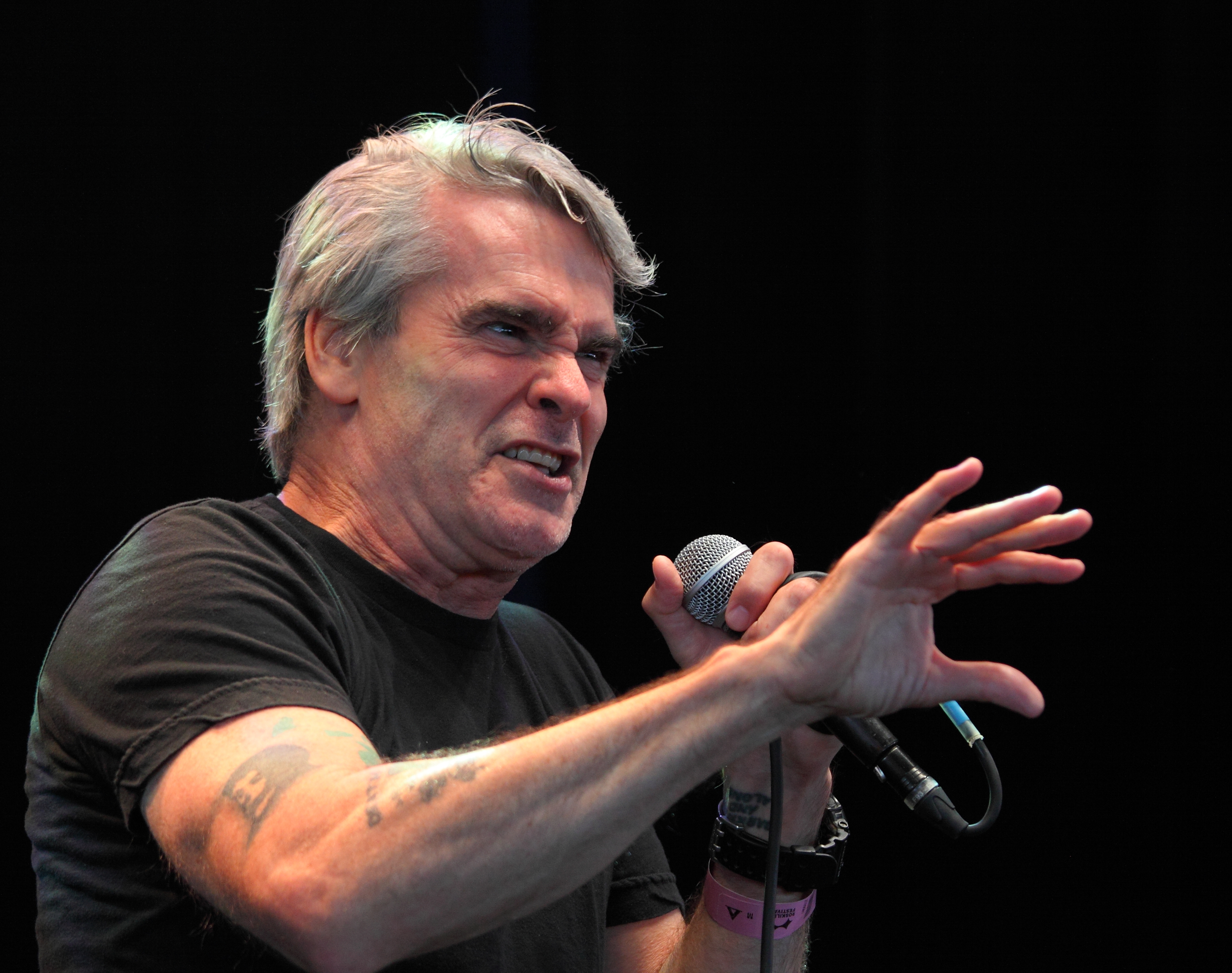
Rollins in 2013, performing spoken word

On the same topic, Rollins more recently said in 2016 "For me, music was a time and a place. I never really enjoyed being in a band. It was in me and it needed to come out, like a 25-year exorcism. One day, I woke up, and I didn't have any more lyrics. I just had nothing to contribute to the form, and I was done with band practice and traveling in groups."

Rollins is a guest star on Damian Cowell's 2017 album Get Yer Dag On!

=== Musical style ===
As a vocalist, Rollins has adopted a number of styles through the years. He was noted in the Washington, D.C. hardcore scene for what journalist Michael Azerrad described as a "compelling, raspy howl". With State of Alert, Rollins "spat out the lyrics like a bellicose auctioneer." He adopted a similar style after joining Black Flag in 1981. By their album Damaged, however, Black Flag began to incorporate a swing beat into their style. Rollins then abandoned his State of Alert "bark" and adopted the band's swing. Rollins later explained: "What I was doing kind of matched the vibe of the music. The music was intense and, well, I was as intense as you needed."

In both incarnations of the Rollins Band, Rollins combined spoken word with his traditional vocal style in songs such as "Liar" (the song begins with a one-minute spoken diatribe by Rollins), barked his way through songs (such as "Tearing" and "Starve"), and employed the loud-quiet dynamic. Rolling Stone's Anthony DeCurtis names Rollins a "screeching hate machine" and his "hallmark" as "the sheets-of-sound assault".

With the Rollins Band, his lyrics focused "almost exclusively on issues relating to personal integrity", according to critic Geoffrey Welchman.

=== As producer ===
In the 1980s, Rollins produced an album of acoustic songs for convict Charles Manson titled Completion. The record was supposed to be released by SST Records, but the project was canceled because the label received death threats for working with Manson. Only five test presses of Completion were pressed, two of which remain in Rollins's possession.

In 1995, Rollins produced Australian hard rock band the Mark of Cain's third full-length album Ill at Ease.

== Media work ==
=== Television ===
As Rollins rose to prominence with the Rollins Band, he began to present and appear on television. These included Alternative Nation and MTV Sports in 1993 and 1994 respectively. Rollins also appeared on an episode of Unsolved Mysteries that explored the murder of his best friend Joe Cole and presented State of the Union Undressed on Comedy Central. Rollins began to present and narrate VH1 Legends in 1996. Rollins, busy with the Rollins Band, did not present more programs until 2001, but made appearances on a number of other television shows, including Welcome to Paradox in 1998 in the episode "All Our Sins Forgotten", as a therapist who develops a device that can erase the bad memories of his patients. Rollins also voiced Mad Stan in Batman Beyond in 1999 and 2000.

Rollins was a host of film review programme Henry's Film Corner on the Independent Film Channel, before presenting the weekly The Henry Rollins Show on the channel. The Henry Rollins Show is now being shown weekly on Film24 along with Henry Rollins Uncut. The show also led to a promotional tour in Europe that led to Rollins being dubbed a "bad boy goodwill ambassador" by a NY reviewer. He also hosted Fox's short-lived 2001 horror anthology series Night Visions. The show's creators wanted Gary Oldman to host this show, but Fox insisted on having Rollins instead.

In 2002, Rollins guest-starred on an episode of the sitcom The Drew Carey Show as a man Oswald found on eBay and paid to come to his house and "kick his ass". He co-hosted the British television show Full Metal Challenge, in which teams built vehicles to compete in various driving and racing contests, from 2002 to 2003 on Channel 4 and TLC. He has made a number of cameo appearances in television series such as MTV's Jackass and an episode of Californication, where he played himself hosting a radio show. In 2006, Rollins appeared in a documentary series by VH1 and The Sundance Channel called The Drug Years.

Rollins appears in FX's Sons of Anarchy's second season, which premiered in the fall of 2009 in the United States. Rollins plays A.J. Weston, a white supremacist gang leader and new antagonist in the show's fictional town of Charming, California, who poses a deadly threat to the Sons of Anarchy Motorcycle Club. In 2009, Rollins voiced "Trucker" in American Dad!'s fourth season (episode eight). Rollins voiced Benjamin Knox/Bonk in the 2000 animated film Batman Beyond: Return of the Joker.

In 2010, Rollins appeared in an episode of the German documentary television series Durch die Nacht mit ... with Iranian artist Shirin Neshat.

Also in 2010, Rollins appeared as a guest judge on season 2 episode 6 of RuPaul's Drag Race.

In 2011, he was interviewed in the National Geographic Explorer episode "Born to Rage", regarding his possible link to the MAOA gene (warrior gene) and violent behavior. In 2012, he hosted the National Geographic Wild series "Animal Underworld", investigating where the real boundaries lie in human-animal relationships. Rollins also appeared in the Hawaii Five-0 episode "Hoʻopio" that aired on May 6, 2013.

In November 2013, Rollins started hosting the show 10 Things You Don't Know About on the History Channel's H2. In 2014, he voiced the antagonist Zaheer in the third season of the animated series The Legend of Korra.

Rollins played the part of Lt. Mueller in episodes 1–3 of the fourth season of the TV series Z Nation, which originally aired on Syfy in 2017.

In 2019, Rollins began appearing as a disillusioned poisons instructor in the TV series Deadly Class.

He was on episode 1 of season 8 of Portlandia. He played a member of the band Riot Spray, also featuring Krist Novoselic.

=== Radio and podcast ===
==== Weekly radio show (2004–2009) ====
On May 19, 2004, Rollins began hosting a weekly radio show, Harmony in My Head, on Indie 103.1 radio in Los Angeles. The show aired every Monday evening, with Rollins playing music ranging from early rock and jump blues to hard rock, blues rock, folk rock, punk rock, heavy metal and rockabilly, and touching on hip-hop, jazz, world music, reggae, classical music and more. Harmony in my Head often emphasizes B-sides, live bootlegs and other rarities, and nearly every episode has featured a song either by the Beastie Boys or British group The Fall.

Rollins put the show on a short hiatus from early to late 2005, to undertake a spoken-word tour. Upon resuming the show, Rollins kicked off his return by playing the show's namesake Buzzcocks song. In 2008, the show was continuing each week, despite Rollins's constant touring, with new pre-recorded shows between live broadcasts. The show ended when the station went off the air in 2009.

==== Weekly radio show (2009–present) ====
On February 18, 2009, KCRW announced that Rollins would be hosting a live show on Saturday nights starting March 7, 2009, which has since been moved to Sunday nights at 8:00 p.m. As of Aug 2023, Rollins has hosted 748 episodes.

==== Podcasts ====
In 2011, Rollins was interviewed on Episode 143 of Marc Maron's podcast WTF released January 23, 2011, and Episode 121 of American Public Media's podcast, The Dinner Party Download, posted on November 3, 2011.

In February 2015, Rollins began recording a semi-regular podcast with his longtime manager Heidi May, titled Henry & Heidi. In describing the show, Rollins stated, "One day Heidi mentioned that I've told her a lot of stories that never made it to the stage and we should do a podcast so I could tell them ... I thought it was a good idea and people seem to like how the two of us get along. We've been working together for over 20 years and are very good friends." The podcast has received positive reviews from Rolling Stone and The A.V. Club.

=== Filmography ===
Rollins began his film career appearing in several independent films featuring the band Black Flag. His film debut was in 1982's The Slog Movie, about the West Coast punk scene. An appearance in 1985's Black Flag Live followed. Rollins's first film appearance without Black Flag was the short film The Right Side of My Brain with Lydia Lunch in 1985. Following the band's breakup, Rollins did not appear in any films until 1994's The Chase. Rollins also appeared as 'Spider' in cult film Johnny Mnemonic, as well as the 2007 direct-to-DVD sequel to Wrong Turn (2003), Wrong Turn 2: Dead End as a retired Marine Corps officer who hosts his own show which tests the contestants' will to survive. Rollins has also appeared in Punk: Attitude, a documentary on the punk scene, and in American Hardcore (2006). In 2012, Rollins appeared in a short documentary entitled "Who Shot Rock and Roll" discussing the early punk scene in Los Angeles as well as photographs of himself in Black Flag taken by photographer Edward Colver. Rollins also inspired the characterization of Negan in The Walking Dead comic and auditioned to play the character in the television series, but eventually lost the role to Jeffrey Dean Morgan.

==== Film ====
Year	Title	Role	Notes
1990	Kiss Napoleon Goodbye	Jackson	
1994	Jugular Wine: A Vampire Odyssey	Self	
1994	The Chase	Officer Dobbs	
1995	Johnny Mnemonic	Spider	
1995	Heat	Hugh Benny	
1997	Lost Highway	Guard Henry	
1998	Jack Frost	Sid Gronic	
2000	Batman Beyond: Return of the Joker	Bonk	Voice
2001	Morgan's Ferry	Monroe	
2001	Dogtown and Z-Boys	Self	Documentary
2001	Scenes of the Crime	Greg	
2002	The New Guy	Warden	
2002	Jackass: The Movie	Himself	Guest appearance
2003	Bad Boys II	TNT Leader	
2003	A House on a Hill	Arthur	
2004	Deathdealer: A Documentary	Vincent	
2005	Feast	Coach	
2006	The Alibi	Putty	
2006	American Hardcore	Self	Documentary
2007	Wrong Turn 2: Dead End	Dale	
2009	The Devil's Tomb	Father Fulton	Direct-to-Video
2009	H for Hunger	Self	Documentary
2009	William Shatner's Gonzo Ballet	Self	Documentary
2009	Suck	Rockin' Roger	
2011	Born to Rage	Self	Documentary
2011	Green Lantern: Emerald Knights	Kilowog	Voice
2012	West of Memphis	Self	Documentary
2013	Downloaded	Self	Documentary
2014	Salad Days	Self	Documentary
2015	He Never Died	Jack	
2015	Gutterdämmerung	Priest Svengali	
2016	The Last Heist	Bernard	
2019	Dreamland	Hercules	
2021	Music	Ebo's Neighbor	

==== Television ====
List of performances on television
Year	Title	Role	Notes
1997	Saturday Night Live	Musical guest (Rollins Band)	1 episode
1999–2001	Batman Beyond	Stanley Labowski / Mad Stan	Voice, 3 episodes
2004	Teen Titans	Johnny Rancid	Voice, 2 episodes
2006	Shorty McShorts' Shorts	Skylar	Voice, 3 episodes
2007	Odd Job Jack	Larry	Voice, episode: "Insecticidal Tendencies"
2009	American Dad!	Trucker	Voice, episode: "Chimdale"
2009	Sons of Anarchy	A.J. Weston	10 episodes
2010–2016	Adventure Time	Bob Rainicorn, Cookie Man	Voice, 3 episodes
2010	Batman: The Brave and the Bold	Cliff Steele / Robotman	Voice, episode: "The Last Patrol!"
2010	Durch die Nacht mit ...	Himself	1 episode
2013	Hawaii Five-0	Ray Beckett	episode: "Ho'opio!"
2013	The Eric Andre Show	Himself	Episode: "Chance the Rapper/Mel B"
2014	The Legend of Korra	Zaheer	Voice, 13 episodes
2014	Uncle Grandpa	Skeletony	Voice, episode: "Hide and Seek"
2014	You're the Worst	Cameo appearance	Episode: "Other Things You Could Be Doing"
2015	Stitchers	Robert Barbiero	Episode: "Full Stop"
2016	Sheriff Callie's Wild West	Speedy Silverado	Voice, episode: "Blazing Skaters"
2017	Stretch Armstrong and the Flex Fighters	Mickey Simmons, Prison Guard	Voice, episode: "The Gangs of Old Town"
2017	Z Nation	Lt. Mueller	3 episodes
2018	Mr. Pickles	Govt. Agent Commander	Voice, episode: "S.H.O.E.S."
2021	Masters of the Universe: Revelation	Tri-Klops	Voice
2023	The Patrick Star Show	FitzPatrick	Voice, episode: "FitzPatrick"

=== Books and audiobooks ===
Rollins discussing his 2014 book Occupants with Thurston Moore

Rollins has written a variety of books, including Black Coffee Blues, Do I Come Here Often?, The First Five (a compilation of High Adventure in the Great Outdoors, Pissing in the Gene Pool, Bang!, Art to Choke Hearts, and One From None), See a Grown Man Cry, Now Watch Him Die, Smile, You're Traveling, Get in the Van, Eye Scream, Broken Summers, Roomanitarian, and Solipsist.

For the audiobook version of the 2006 novel World War Z, Rollins voiced the character of T. Sean Collins, a mercenary hired to protect celebrities during a mass panic caused by an onslaught of the undead. Rollins' other audiobook recordings include 3:10 to Yuma and his own autobiographical book, Get in the Van, for which he won a Grammy Award.

In early 2005, with his weekly show on hiatus, Rollins posted playlists and commentary on-line; these lists were expanded with more information and published in book form as Fanatic! in November 2005. In 2007 and 2008, Rollins published Fanatic! Vol. 2 and Fanatic! Vol. 3, respectively.

Rollins continued to take notes of the music featured on his show, and wanted to preserve them in book form along with scans of set lists, flyers and other music-related materials he had been collecting since the 70s. These volumes Stay Fanatic!!! Vol. 1, Stay Fanatic!!! Vol. 2 and Stay Fanatic!!! Vol. 3 were published in 2018, 2021 and 2022, respectively.

=== Online journalism ===
In September 2008, Rollins began contributing to the "Politics & Power" blog at the online version of Vanity Fair magazine. Since March 2009, his posts have appeared under their own sub-title, Straight Talk Espresso. His posts consistently criticize conservative politicians and pundits, although he does occasionally target those on the left. In August 2010, he began writing a music column for LA Weekly in Los Angeles. In 2012, Rollins began publishing articles with HuffPost and alternative news website WordswithMeaning! In the months leading up to the 2012 United States Presidential election, Rollins broadcast a YouTube series called "Capitalism 2012", in which he toured the capital cities of the US states, interviewing people about current issues.

=== Spoken word ===
Since the 1980s, Rollins has toured around the world doing spoken word performances and his shows frequently last for over three hours. His spoken word style encompasses stand-up comedy, accounts of experiences he has had in the world of music and during his extensive travels around the globe, self-deprecating stories about his own shortcomings, introspective recollections from his own life (such as the death of his friend, Joe Cole), commentaries on society and playful anecdotes. "The talking shows are more demanding, because it's only me on stage", Rollins explained in regards to his spoken word shows. "It's like comparing surgery with construction – one requires super concentration and the other is just physical."

=== Video games ===
Rollins was a playable character in both Def Jam: Fight for NY and Def Jam Fight for NY: The Takeover. Rollins is also the voice of Mace Griffin in Mace Griffin: Bounty Hunter.

== Campaigning and activism ==
Rollins has become an outspoken human rights activist, most vocally for gay rights. In high school, a gay classmate of Rollins was bullied by classmates to the point of attempting suicide. Rollins has cited this as the main catalyst of his "anti-homophobia". Rollins frequently speaks out on justice on his spoken word tours and promotes equality, regardless of sexuality. He was the host of the WedRock benefit concert, which raised money for a pro-gay-marriage organization.

During the Iraq War, he started touring with the United Service Organizations to entertain troops overseas while remaining against the war, leading him to once cause a stir at a base in Kyrgyzstan when he told the crowd: "Your commander would never lie to you. That's the vice president's job." Rollins believes it is important that he performs for the troops so that they have multiple points of contact with other parts of the world, stating that "they can get really cut loose from planet earth." He has made eight tours, including visits to bases in Djibouti, Kuwait, Iraq, Kyrgyzstan, Afghanistan (twice), Egypt, Turkey, Qatar, Honduras, Japan, Korea and the United Arab Emirates.

He has also been active in the campaign to free the "West Memphis Three", three young men who are believed by their supporters to have been wrongfully convicted of murder, and who have since been released from prison, but not exonerated. Rollins appears with Public Enemy frontman Chuck D on the Black Flag song "Rise Above" on the 2002 benefit album Rise Above: 24 Black Flag Songs to Benefit the West Memphis Three, the first time Rollins had performed Black Flag's material since 1986.

Continuing his activism on behalf of US troops and veterans, Rollins joined Iraq and Afghanistan Veterans of America (IAVA) in 2008 to launch a public service advertisement campaign, CommunityofVeterans.org, which helps veterans coming home from war reintegrate into their communities. In April 2009, Rollins helped IAVA launch the second phase of the campaign which engages the friends and family of Iraq and Afghanistan veterans at SupportYourVet.org.

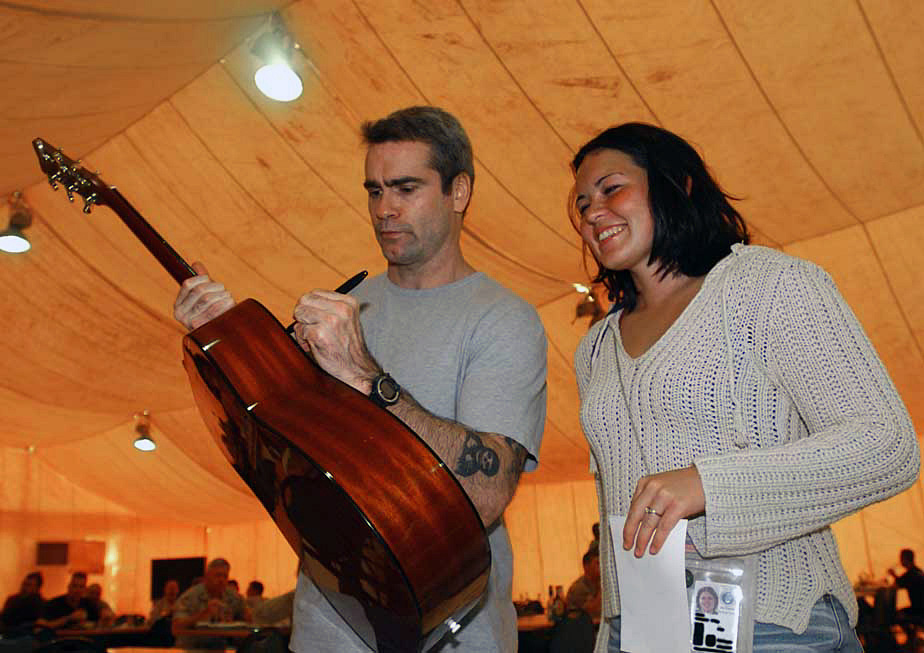
Rollins signing a guitar while on a United Service Organizations (USO) tour in Iraq in 2003

On December 3, 2009, Rollins wrote of his support for the victims of the Bhopal disaster in India, in an article for Vanity Fair 25 years–to the day–after the methyl isocyanate gas leak from the Union Carbide Corporation's pesticide factory exposed more than half a million local people to poisonous gas and resulted in the deaths of 17,000 people. He spent time in Bhopal with the people, to listen to their stories. In a later radio interview in February 2010 Rollins summed up his approach to activism, "This is where my anger takes me, to places like this, not into abuse but into proactive, clean movement."

Rollins is an advocate for the legalization of cannabis. Rollins has stated he does not personally consume cannabis but views the issue as an important matter of civil rights, arguing that its illegality is based in "bigotry and racism and financing the prison–industrial complex". Rollins has shared his views on the subject as keynote speaker at the Oregon Marijuana Business Conference and the International Cannabis Business Conference.

In August 2015, Rollins discussed his support for Bernie Sanders as a candidate in the 2016 Democratic Party presidential primaries.

== Personal life ==
=== Views and relationships ===
Rollins has said that he does not have religious or spiritual beliefs, though he also does not consider himself an atheist. He has mostly avoided recreational drugs throughout his life, but experimented a few times with alcohol, cannabis, and LSD during his teens and early 20s.

Rollins is childless by choice, and says that he has not been in a romantic relationship since his 20s. Rollins said, "I am not that interested in having someone to account to and be romantic with on a regular basis. Every once in a while I think I want it, but it's like holding on to sand. It always slips away. Falling in love does not interest me." A lifelong bachelor, Rollins considers himself a solitary person and maintains few deep relationships outside of his professional ones. His best friend is Minor Threat and Fugazi lead singer Ian MacKaye, with whom he has been close since they met as children. He also enjoys a friendship with actor William Shatner, which developed after he performed on Shatner's album Has Been.

After nearly 40 years of living in Los Angeles, Rollins mentioned during his "Good to see you" tour that he had relocated to Nashville.

In an interview with Jason Tanamor of Zoiks! Online, when asked about a longtime rumor of Rollins being homosexual, the singer said, "Perhaps wishful thinking. If I were gay, believe me, you would know."

On a broadcast of The Howard Stern Show on October 15, 2001, Rollins expressed his criticism of U2 by stating that they have "the weakest rhythm section ever known in a multi-platinum band." Rollins explained his personal opinions on the individual members of the band when he noted: "the drummer can't drum, the bass player can't play, the guitar player has one riff. The singer is this utter buffoon who should be in a bar." Rollins additionally expressed his distaste for the album All That You Can't Leave Behind by arguing that it is "the most tired, adult oriented crap I've ever heard since the last Sting record."

=== Murder of Joe Cole ===
In December 1991, Rollins and his best friend Joe Cole were the victims of an armed robbery and shooting when they were assaulted by robbers outside their shared home in Venice Beach, California. Cole died after being shot in the face, but Rollins escaped. The murder remains unsolved. In an April 1992 Los Angeles Times interview, Rollins revealed he kept a plastic container full of soil soaked with Cole's blood: "I dug up all the earth where his head fell—he was shot in the face—and I've got all the dirt here, and so Cole's in the house. I say good morning to him every day. I got his phone, too, so I got a direct line to him. So that feels good."

In a 2001 interview with Howard Stern, Rollins was asked about rumors that he kept Cole's brain in his house. He stated that he has only the soil from the spot where Cole was killed. During the interview, he also speculated that the reason they were targeted may have been because, days prior to the incident, record producer Rick Rubin had requested to hear the newly recorded album The End of Silence and parked his Rolls-Royce outside their house while carrying a cell phone. Because of the notoriety of the neighborhood, Rollins suspected that this would bring trouble because of the implication that there was money in the home. He even wrote in his journal the night of Rubin's visit that his home "is going to get popped".

Rollins has included Cole's story in his spoken word performances.

== Works ==
=== Musical releases ===
==== With State of Alert ====
- No Policy (1981)
- Flex Your Head (1982)

==== With Black Flag ====
- Damaged (1981)
- My War (1984)
- Family Man (1984)
- Slip It In (1984)
- Live '84 (1984)
- Loose Nut (1985)
- In My Head (1985)
- Who's Got the 10½? (1986)

==== Solo ====
- Hot Animal Machine (1987)
- Drive by Shooting (1987)
- Live (1987) – split album with Gore

==== With Rollins Band ====
- Life Time (1987, re-release 1999)
- Hard Volume (1989, re-release 1999)
- Turned On (1990)
- The End of Silence (1992, double-CD re-release 2002) No. 160 US
- Weight (1994) No. 33 US, No. 22 UK
- Come In and Burn (1997) No. 89 US
- Insert Band Here (1999)
- A Clockwork Orange Stage (2000)
- Get Some Go Again (2000) No. 180 US
- Nice (2001) No. 178 US
- A Nicer Shade of Red (2002)
- End of Silence Demos (2002)
- The Only Way to Know for Sure: Live in Chicago (2002)
- Rise Above: 24 Black Flag Songs to Benefit the West Memphis Three (2002)
- Weighting (2004)

==== With Wartime ====
- Fast Food For Thought (1990)

=== Spoken word ===
- Short Walk on a Long Pier (1985)
- Big Ugly Mouth (1987)
- Sweatbox (1989)
- Live at McCabe's (1990)
- Human Butt (1992)
- The Boxed Life (1993)
- Think Tank (1998)
- Eric the Pilot (1999)
- A Rollins in the Wry (2001)
- Live at the Westbeth Theater (2001)
- Talk Is Cheap: Volume 1 (2003)
- Talk Is Cheap: Volume 2 (2003)
- Talk Is Cheap: Volume 3 (2004)
- Talk Is Cheap: Volume 4 (2004)
- Provoked (2008)
- Spoken Word Guy (2010)
- Spoken Word Guy 2 (2010)

Spoken word videos

- Talking from the Box (1993)
- Henry Rollins Goes to London (1995)
- You Saw Me Up There (1998)
- Up for It (2001)
- Live at Luna Park (2004)
- Shock & Awe: The Tour (2005)
- Uncut from NYC (2006)
- Uncut from Israel (2006)
- San Francisco 1990 (2007)
- Live in the Conversation Pit (2008)
- Provoked: Live From Melbourne (2008)
- 50 (2012)
- Keep Talking, Pal (2018)

=== Audio books ===
- Get in the Van: On the Road with Black Flag (1994)
- Everything (1996)
- Black Coffee Blues (1997)
- Nights Behind the Tree Line (2004)
- World War Z (2007)

=== Guest appearances and collaborations ===
Henry Rollins discography
Song	Artist	Album	Year
Minor Threat's First Demo – provided additional Vocals (credited as Henry Garfield)	Minor Threat	First Demo Tape EP	1981
"We Are 138"	Misfits	Evilive	1982
"Kick Out the Jams"	Bad Brains	Pump Up the Volume Soundtrack	1990
"Let There Be Rock"	Hard-Ons	Released as a single	1991
"Bottom" (Spoken word monologue by Henry, 3:14 minutes into the song)	Tool	Undertow	1993
"Wild America"	Iggy Pop	American Caesar	1993
"Sexual Military Dynamics"	Mike Watt	Ball-Hog or Tugboat?	1995
"Delicate Tendrils"	Les Claypool and the Holy Mackerel	Highball with the Devil	1996
"T-4 Strain"	Goldie	Spawn: The Album	1997
"War"	Bone Thugs-n-Harmony, Tom Morello & Flea	Small Soldiers	1998
"Laughing Man (In the Devil Mask)"	Tony Iommi	Iommi	2000
"I Can't Get Behind That"	William Shatner	Has Been	2004
All tracks	The Flaming Lips	The Flaming Lips and Stardeath and White Dwarfs with Henry Rollins and Peaches Doing the Dark Side of the Moon	2009
"Grey 11"	The Mark of Cain	Songs of the Third and Fifth	2012
"Come On Waleed"	Damian Cowell's Disco Machine	Get Yer Dag On	2017
"Jingle Bells"	William Shatner	Shatner Claus	2018
"Jingle Bells (Punk Rock Version)"	William Shatner	Shatner Claus	2018
"Riotstarted!"	Public Enemy	The Evil Empire of Everything	2012
"All tracks"	Charles Manson	Completion	Additional production- Henry Rollins

=== Essays ===
- I Am an Audiophile, an editorial essay in Stereophile.
- Iron and the Soul, an editorial essay in Details.
