= Who's Got the 10½? =

Live album by Black Flag
- Released: March 19, 1986
- Recorded: August 23, 1985
- Venue: The Starry Night, Portland, Oregon
- Genre: Hardcore punk
- Length: 39:11 (Vinyl); 64:23 (CD)
- Label: SST (060)
- Producer: Greg Ginn

Black Flag chronology
| Minuteflag (1986) | Who's Got the 10½? (1986) | Annihilate This Week (1986) |

Professional ratings
Review scores
| Source | Rating |
|---|---|
| AllMusic | 4.5/5 stars |
| Christgau's Record Guide | A− |
| The Encyclopedia of Popular Music | 3/5 stars |
| The Great Rock Discography | 6/10 |
| MusicHound Rock | 3/5 stars |
| (The New) Rolling Stone Album Guide | 3/5 stars |
| Spin Alternative Record Guide | 6/10 |

Who's Got the 10½? is a live album by the American hardcore punk rock band Black Flag, released in 1986 through SST Records. The album was recorded live at Starry Night in Portland, Oregon on August 23, 1985.

This album was recorded by the DogFish Sound mobile recording truck owned by Drew Canulette and Norm Costa, and based in Newberg, Oregon. Henry Rollins referred to the recording as his favorite Black Flag album on his 2018 Keep Talking, Pal special.

== Track listing ==
Side A
| No. | Title | Writer(s) | Length |
|---|---|---|---|
| 1. | "Loose Nut" | Ginn | 4:00 |
| 2. | "I'm the One" | Roessler; Rollins | 2:44 |
| 3. | "Bastard in Love" | Ginn | 3:00 |
| 4. | "Modern Man" | Chuck Dukowski; Ed Danky | 3:34 |
| 5. | "This Is Good" | Ginn; Rollins | 3:22 |
| 6. | "In My Head" | Ginn; Rollins | 4:26 |

Side B
| No. | Title | Writer(s) | Length |
|---|---|---|---|
| 7. | "My War" | Dukowski | 3:47 |
| 8. | "Slip It In" / "Gimmie, Gimmie, Gimmie" | Ginn | 14:48 |
| 9. | "Drinking and Driving" | Ginn; Rollins | 3:00 |

CD/Cassette editions
| No. | Title | Writer(s) | Length |
|---|---|---|---|
| 1. | "Loose Nut" | Ginn | 4:00 |
| 2. | "I'm the One" | Roessler; Rollins | 2:44 |
| 3. | "Annihilate" | Ginn | 4:44 |
| 4. | "Wasted" | Ginn; Keith Morris | 1:01 |
| 5. | "Bastard in Love" | Ginn | 3:00 |
| 6. | "Modern Man" | Chuck Dukowski; Ed Danky | 3:34 |
| 7. | "This Is Good" | Ginn; Rollins | 3:22 |
| 8. | "In My Head" | Ginn; Rollins | 4:26 |
| 9. | "Sinking" | Ginn; Rollins | 5:04 |
| 10. | "Jam" | Ginn; Roesseler; Martinez | 4:05 |
| 11. | "Best One Yet" | Roesseler; Rollins | 2:35 |
| 12. | "My War" | Dukowski | 3:47 |
| 13. | "Slip It In" / "Gimmie, Gimmie, Gimmie" | Ginn | 14:48 |
| 14. | "Drinking and Driving" | Ginn; Rollins | 3:00 |
| 15. | "Louie Louie" | Richard Berry | 4:13 |

== Personnel ==
Black Flag

- Henry Rollins – vocals
- Greg Ginn – guitar
- Kira Roessler – bass
- Anthony Martinez – drums

Production

- Greg Ginn – producer
- Drew Canulette – engineer
- Jeffrey Bruton – assistant engineer
- Norm Costa – recording production director
