= Hard Volume =

1989 studio album by Rollins Band

Studio album by Rollins Band
- Released: 1989
- Recorded: July–December 1988
- Genre: Post-hardcore
- Length: 71:03
- Label: Texas Hotel
- Producer: Theo Van Rock

Rollins Band chronology
Do It (1987)	Hard Volume (1989)	Turned On (1990)

Professional ratings
Review scores
Source	Rating
AllMusic	4/5 stars
Alternative Press	p.97-8, 4/00
The Austin Chronicle	3/5 stars
The Encyclopedia of Popular Music	3/5 stars
MusicHound Rock: The Essential Album Guide	3/5 stars
Punknews.org	5/5 stars
Spin Alternative Record Guide	5/10
Sputnikmusic	5/5

Hard Volume is the second studio album by American rock band Rollins Band, released in 1989. It was reissued with previously unreleased tracks in 1999 through Buddah Records.

The original CD release contained a 32-minute jam on the Velvet Underground outtake "Move Right In," titled "Joy Riding with Frank." The track was recorded live in Linz, Austria, during the band's 1988 tour. The 1999 remastered edition replaced this track with six studio tracks: three from the album session at Echo Sound in Los Angeles in December 1988, and three from a demo session recorded in July 1988 at Graphic Studios in New Jersey.

== Critical reception ==
Trouser Press wrote that Rollins "sinks into an existential funk on the seven-song Hard Volume ... Oddly, the rest of the band seems unaffected by his moods, and the music — a well-organized rock juggernaut — thunders along happily." Dave Thompson, in Alternative Rock, called the album "a funked-up swagger that is moody and electrically eclectic."

== Track listing ==
All tracks composed by the Rollins Band, except where indicated.

=== Original release ===
1. "Hard" – 4:06
2. "What Have I Got" – 4:58
3. "I Feel Like This" – 4:26
4. "Planet Joe" – 4:18
5. "Love Song" – 6:22
6. "Turned Inside Out" – 6:24
7. "Down and Away" – 8:20
8. "Joy Riding with Frank" - 32:04

=== Remastered version (1999) ===
1. "Hard" – 4:06
2. "What Have I Got" – 4:58
3. "I Feel Like This" – 4:26
4. "Planet Joe" – 4:18
5. "Love Song" – 6:22
6. "Turned Inside Out" – 6:24
7. "Down and Away" – 8:20

==== Session outtakes ====
1. "Tearing" – 4:58*
2. "You Didn't Need" – 5:11*
3. "Ghost Rider" (Martin Rev, Alan Vega) – 7:23*

==== Demo: July 1988 ====
1. "What Have I Got" – 4:33*
2. "Thin Air" – 8:21*
3. "Down and Away" – 7:14*

== Personnel ==
=== Rollins Band ===
- Henry Rollins – vocals
- Chris Haskett – guitar
- Andrew Weiss – bass
- Sim Cain – drums, percussion

=== Production ===
- Theo Van Rock – producer, mixing
- Rae DiLeo – mixing
- George Marino – mastering (1999 remaster)
- Wally Traugott – mastering (1989 original)
- Jeff Aguila – design
