= Talk Is Cheap Vol I =

Talk Is Cheap: Volume 1

Live album by Henry Rollins
- Released: 23 January 2003
- Recorded: 23 April 2001 at the Enmore Theater in Sydney, Australia
- Genre: Spoken word Comedy
- Length: 133:40
- Label: 2.13.61

Henry Rollins chronology
Live At the Westbeth Theater (2001)	Talk Is Cheap: Volume 1 (2003)	Talk Is Cheap: Volume 2 (2003)

Professional ratings
Review scores
Source	Rating
Allmusic	4/5 stars

Talk Is Cheap: Volume 1 is the 11th live spoken word album from Henry Rollins, released January 23, 2003 on 2.13.61 Records. The following night, Talk Is Cheap: Volume 2 was recorded at the same theater.

== Track listing ==
=== Disc 1 ===
1. "Hello, I Am Old" - 13:58
2. "Gyrlz2womyn" - 2:31
3. "Boyz In the Adulthood" - 18:13
4. "Getting It Together" - 2:48
5. "Drowning In the Swim of Things" - 13:39
6. "A River In Egypt" - 15:27
7. "What We Know About You" - 4:18
8. "Getting Snippy With It" - 6:48

=== Disc 2 ===
1. "Your Very Own Tank" - 17:43
2. "I'd Be A Good Boss" - 21:01
3. "I'd Be A Dead Boss" - 1:57
4. "Classic Geographic" - 15:22

== Credits ==
- Randy Fransz - Recording
- Rae Di Leo - Mixing
- Dave Chapple - Design
- Mike Curtis - Road Manager
