= Get Some Go Again =

Studio album by Rollins Band
- Released: February 29, 2000
- Recorded: 1999 (Cherokee, Hollywood)
- Genre: Alternative metal, hardcore punk, hard rock
- Length: 55:13
- Label: DreamWorks
- Producer: Henry Rollins

Rollins Band chronology
Come In and Burn (1997)	Get Some Go Again (2000)	Nice (2001)

Get Some Go Again (stylized as Get Some -> Go Again) is the sixth studio album by Rollins Band, released in 2000. It is also the first album by lead singer Henry Rollins after dissolving his longtime lineup featuring guitarist Chris Haskett and others. On this album, and its follow-up Nice, Rollins was backed by the band Mother Superior.

== Background and recording ==
After completing touring for their 1997 DreamWorks debut Come in and Burn, Rollins Band went on hiatus and Henry Rollins began working together with Mother Superior. At the beginning of 1998, they asked him to produce songs for their upcoming third studio album Deep, which would end up being recorded in just three days. Rollins had previously seen some of their shows in Los Angeles and was a fan of the first demo tape they had put out. After the collaboration on Deep, Rollins asked Mother Superior to return the favor and write songs with him.They booked rehearsal time in the same studio where Rollins had first practiced with Black Flag. Rollins and Mother Superior wrote three songs that night, with Rollins saying that they were "exactly the kind of music that I had always wanted to make." Initially, Rollins had been planning on making a solo record, which would include collaborations with both Mother Superior and Flea from the Red Hot Chili Peppers. However, this solo project never got off the ground, and Rollins decided to solely focus on working with Mother Superior.

Later in 1998, Rollins and members of Mother Superior played a handful of shows together in the United States. The name "Rollins Band" was retained under the insistence of management, rather than Rollins himself. The last concert Rollins had played with the old lineup was on October 17, 1997, in Osaka, Japan, with guitarist Chris Haskett only finding out he wasn't in the band anymore through the internet in 1998, where he had read that Rollins Band were playing shows again. Haskett had believed that the band was going to reconvene following their hiatus, and that Rollins' work with Mother Superior was simply going to be a side project. Regarding the old lineup, Rollins told CMJ New Music Monthly in 2000 that, "it was really hard to make Come in and Burn. That was the last record I made with the old band [and] writing wasn't easy — me and the guys were diverging in musical paths." He added, "live, some of the mid-tempo songs [from Come in and Burn] were difficult for me. By the time we got to the end of the '97 tour I thought we had realized our thing, we were done. I wasn't getting the excitement that I needed. I didn't want to fire anybody but I didn't think there was anything more to do in that equation." Mother Superior's guitarist Jim Wilson later claimed that Rollins told him that he didn't like how long his old band had spent writing and recording Come in and Burn, and that he preferred the quicker way in which Mother Superior were able to make music together.

By 1999, recording for the next Rollins Band album commenced. In July 1999, Rollins Band went on a small eight show tour of the United States, where they previewed some of the new songs.

For the album, Rollins booked the band to record at Cherokee Studios in Hollywood. He would leave by himself every night at 6pm. Rollins told the other members that they could record material for Mother Superior after he had left the studio, which they would sometimes do. Jim Wilson remembered that, "I think the studio was getting a little mad, because we were getting too much stuff done, we were working so fast." The idea for the single "Illumination" originated through Rollins, who came to the band members with what would become the main guitar riff for the song. This was also how several other songs on the album originated, such as "On the Day". For others, Wilson would come to Rollins with riff ideas that would eventually evolve into fully fleshed songs. The recording sessions for Get Some Go Again included several outtakes which would later be released on various singles and compilation releases. All 13 songs that made the final cut for the album were chosen by Rollins. The black-and-white cover artwork of a woman walking by a group of men was originally taken in 1959.

According to Rollins, DreamWorks "hated" Get Some Go Again due to its different sound when compared to previous releases, but he never told his bandmates this, since they were about to go on tour and he didn't want to demoralize them.

== Musical style ==
Henry Rollins said in 2000 that the album "sounds like Thin Lizzy and Black Sabbath and John Lee Hooker or Lightnin' Hopkins", and claimed that "I'm very happy with Get Some, Go Again. I like the sounds, the playing, the takes, the soul and the passion, and feel that I have given it everything I've got. I'm very proud of the record." In a May 2000 interview with the Tampa Bay Times, he also observed that, "I don't feel like a young person anymore. I listen to the lyrics of the fella from Limp Bizkit and I remember that angst. But I no longer have that. That's a young man's angst."

== Touring ==
Between January and May 2000, Rollins Band toured the United States/Canada, Europe and Australia. For several of the American shows, they were supported by the nu metal band Apartment 26. After doing two shows with Apartment 26 at The Whiskey in Hollywood, the band embarked on another European tour, which ran through the summer of 2000. The band's show at the Danish Roskilde Festival on July 1, 2000 was later released on a live album titled A Clockwork Orange Stage, which was put out on Rollins' own 2.13.61 label. Their performance occurred the night after nine fans died from a trampling incident during Pearl Jam's performance. Headliners Oasis and Pet Shop Boys both canceled their scheduled appearances at the festival following the incident, out of respect for the families of the victims. Rollins recalled in 2001, "the Pet Shop people and the Oasis people came over with their corny, self-righteous, 'Well, what're you going to do?'. And we told 'em, 'Well, we're going to rock.' They're like, 'Oh my god. How can you?' I was like, 'Man, go back to your bus before you have my big American foot planted up your ass.'"

Around this time, Fox had offered Rollins a recurring role on their sci-fi program The X-Files, but Rollins was unable to accept it, since it was going to clash with the summer European tour. As a result of the clash, Fox instead offered him a role as host of an upcoming horror anthology series called Night Visions, which he accepted.

== Release ==
The album has been released with extra tracks and/or several slight variations in different territories, and was also released as an Enhanced CD with multimedia tracks, including videos in QuickTime format. Due to a manufacturing error, copies pressed and released for sale in the United States omitted the song "Illuminator", a remix of the first song on the album, "Illumination". In 2000 the album's publisher, DreamWorks Records, issued a statement to fans saying that those who purchased the defective discs could write the company and received a special promotional CD with the missing track, as well as a copy of the bonus enhanced CD.

Like with their previous DreamWorks release Come In and Burn, it had underwhelming sales, and the band left the label once their contract expired, releasing their next album Nice on Sanctuary Records in 2001. When Rollins left DreamWorks, he took possession of the master tapes and reissued both this album's tracks, including the missing "Illuminator" remix, along with the outtake tracks on the companion album Yellow Blues, for the double CD Get Some Go Again Sessions. It was put out on Rollins' own 2.13.61 label, rather than Sanctuary.

Universal Music Group currently retain the rights for any future releases of the original Come In and Burn and Get Some Go Again albums, as those albums are currently under their Interscope Geffen A&M division. UMG acquired these rights in November 2003, after they reached a $100 million dollar agreement to buy DreamWorks Records from DreamWorks Pictures. So far, Come In and Burn and Get Some Go Again have not received vinyl releases from either UMG or any sublicensor labels, and prior to 2023, the original Come In and Burn album from 1997 was not available on Spotify. Rollins said this was due to DreamWorks folding into UMG. Prior to 2023, the Come In and Burn Sessions (a 2.13.61 companion album from 2005) was available on Spotify in some regions.

== Reception and legacy ==
Professional ratings
Review scores
Source	Rating
AllMusic	2.5/5 stars
Chronicles of Chaos	9/10
Kerrang!	4/5 stars
Spin	7/10

Upon release, critics noted its more basic hard rock sound compared to prior albums that featured more experimental influences and lengthier songs. In 2000, CMJ New Music Report compared Get Some Go Again album to Motörhead, and claimed that it replaces the "arty, jazz-metal of the previous Rollins Band with undiluted, unforgiving, 200-proof rawk". The publication also said that the single "Love's So Heavy" was "[like] Thin Lizzy's 'Still in Love with You' run through with a Red Hot Chili Peppers thrash and groove", while The Pitch described the song as "Jane's Addiction-tinged". AllMusic's Chris True labelled the album an "infectious blend of acid rock, metal, and punk", claiming that "with 1997's Come In and Burn, everyone (including Henry Rollins himself) knew that the Rollins Band lineup of Sim Cain, Melvin Gibbs, and Chris Haskett had reached an impasse. While the band was entering into new territory, featuring acoustic and jazz work, Rollins was stomping down the same path he had since his days in the Washington, D.C., hardcore scene." He further adds that the new stripped-down sound "seems to have reinvigorated Rollins himself, who sounds like he's actually having fun on this record." In 2022, Louder Sound placed it sixth on their ranking of the seven Rollins Band studio albums, similarly remarking that, "after the deep introspection of Come In and Burn, Get Some is the sound of a rejuvenated Henry Rollins having fun." Paul Schwarz of extreme metal website Chronicles of Chaos gave it an 9 out of 10 in May 2000, writing that Rollins "has distanced himself from the gritty, bitter taste of 1997's Come in and Burn", adding that "the result is less subtle but ultimately more solidly rocking." Schwarz also noted that the album showcases Rollins' "undying passion for classic bands like Black Sabbath or Thin Lizzy." The Lawrence Journal-World's March 2000 review stated that "the muscle man has returned to his roots (both his volatile Black Flag days and teen-age favorites) to craft what is assuredly the most accessible Rollins Band album." The reviews adds that, "of course, this isn't the same Rollins Band, [he] enlisted the help of L.A. outfit Mother Superior, who couldn't care less for the sarcastic rage of 'Liar', but sure knows its way around a Sabbath riff."

In 2021, Alternative Press included it on their list of the "Best Punk albums of 2000", reflecting, "[in the 1990s] Rollins Band became an alt-metal powerhouse, dominating MTV with 'Low Self Opinion' and 'Liar'. Their sixth album found the entire band replaced by Los Angeles hard rockers Mother Superior. Get Some Go Again was perhaps more straightforward than such LPs as Weight, possibly slightly less funky and jazzy, like hearing Rollins sing atop Jimi Hendrix and Black Sabbath outtakes. Not necessarily a bad thing." In 2020, it was also included on a Kerrang! list titled "20 Classic Albums That Are 20 Years Old In 2020".

== Track listing ==
All songs written by Rollins Band (Henry Rollins, Jim Wilson, Marcus Blake and Jason Mackenroth) except as noted.

No.	Title	Music	Length
1.	"Illumination"		4:11
2.	"Get Some Go Again"		2:12
3.	"Monster"		3:03
4.	"Love's So Heavy"		3:53
5.	"Thinking Cap"		4:11
6.	"Change It Up"		3:03
7.	"I Go Day Glo"		1:45
8.	"Are You Ready?"	Scott Gorham, Phil Lynott, Brian Downey, Brian Robertson	2:43
9.	"On the Day"		3:44
10.	"You Let Yourself Down"		2:46
11.	"Brother Interior"		5:39
12.	"Hotter and Hotter"	Wayne Kramer	3:50
13.	"Illuminator"		4:04
14.	"L.A. Money Train"		14:13
Total length:			59:17

== Personnel ==
Rollins Band

- Henry Rollins – vocals
- Jason Mackenroth – drums, saxophone
- Marcus Blake – bass
- Jim Wilson – guitar, piano

with:

- Scott Gorham – second guitar on "Are You Ready?"
- Wayne Kramer – guitar on "Hotter and Hotter" and "L.A. Money Train"

Technical

- Clif Norrell – recording, mixing
- George Marino – mastering

== Charts ==
Chart performance for Get Some Go Again
Chart (2000)	Peak position
Australian Albums (ARIA)	40
German Albums (Offizielle Top 100)	60
US Billboard 200	180
