= Nice (Rollins Band album) =

2001 studio album by Rollins Band

Studio album by Rollins Band
- Released: August 21, 2001
- Recorded: 2000–2001
- Studio: Cherokee (Hollywood)
- Genre: Hard rock, alternative metal
- Length: 44:56
- Label: Sanctuary
- Producer: Henry Rollins

Rollins Band chronology
Get Some Go Again (2000)	Nice (2001)	A Nicer Shade of Red (2002)

Singles from Nice
- 1. "Your Number Is One" Released: 2001

Alternate cover
- Alternate censored cover

Nice is the seventh and final studio album by the American rock band Rollins Band, released in 2001.

The band line-up was Henry Rollins fronting the blues rock band Mother Superior, while retaining the Rollins Band name. This was also the case with the 2000 album Get Some Go Again.

== Background ==
It was their first release for Sanctuary Records, which specialized in hard rock and heavy metal music. Between 1996 and 2000, the band had been signed to DreamWorks Records. They departed the label when their contract expired, following underwhelming sales for Get Some Go Again and their prior DreamWorks release, Come In and Burn (1997). Rollins told ABC News in February 2001 that, "they lost money on me, and record companies are about money, not about soul. Nice people, but — when you have a DreamWorks guy come up to you and say, 'Hey, man, are you going to tour on this record?' and you're already 40 shows in — that is record-company speak for 'You're already extinct at this label. No one knows you exist.'" Rollins noted that the A&R representative at the label never even met the members of his band, adding that "at the end of the day, everyone's happy. They no longer have their money drained and I no longer have a bunch of lazy senior executives."

During the making of Nice, Rollins was often flying in and out of Vancouver, Canada to record parts for Fox's horror anthology show Night Visions, which he hosted. In a 2001 interview, Rollins reflected on the recording process for the album, saying it was made in "[a] very simple fashion. Analog two-inch tape, real instruments, cut live, no drum beats fixed, no vocals pitched, just music played hard, good sounds going onto tape, very few takes." Rollins further added, "our road manager Mike Curtis, a guitar and tone aficionado, set us up with several amp, cabinet, and pedal options he constructed with gear he rented from L.A.'s Black Market vintage gear store. We got some great guitar sounds this time around." For the album, Rollins decided to hire songwriters Dianne Warren and Desmond Child to help him compose some of the music, since he and his bandmates were a fan of the work they did with Bon Jovi and Aerosmith. Shortly before the album's release, the band performed at the 2001 edition of the punk-focused Warped Tour.

== Musical style and songs ==
The album has been described as containing elements of blues rock, garage rock, funk, metal and punk. In a 2001 interview from the Warped Tour, Rollins said: "I don't feel like punk. I'm in a band of long-haired hard rockers who like Kiss." Outtakes from Nice would end up being released shortly afterwards on the album A Nicer Shade of Red, which was released by Henry Rollins' own 2.13.61 label, alongside Yellow Blues and the Get Some Go Again Sessions (which were both a collection of outtakes from Get Some Go Again). These albums featured several outtakes which showcased a more experimental sound reminiscent of the band's work in the 1990s, including songs such as "Raped" and "Stone Washed Clean" from the Nice sessions.

== Critical reception ==
Professional ratings
Review scores
Source	Rating
AllMusic	4/5 stars
The Encyclopedia of Popular Music	3/5 stars
Pitchfork Media	3.0/10
Spin	4/10
Sputnikmusic	2/5

Nice has received generally mixed reviews from critics. The Cleveland Scene considered it to be a continuation of the sound heard on Get Some Go Again. In October 2001, Spin deemed the album "lukewarm metal oatmeal with funk raisins." The Hartford Courant wrote that "songs occasionally drift off into quiet blues-guitar passages, but they're inevitably interrupted by Rollins' brutish bellow, which often feels out of place." In February 2002, Pitchfork's Dominique Leone gave the album a negative review, awarding it only a 3 out of 10. Leone wrote, "Henry Rollins' latest release, Nice, is utterly irrelevant in the context of almost every other album reviewed at Pitchfork. It's too macho to be indie, too rock to be punk, too 'in your face, to tha X-treme' to be current, too Guitar Center to be Amoeba. It is certainly too Rollins to be subtle or multi-dimensional."

In November 2001, Dylan P. Gadino of CMJ New Music Monthly compared the album to Thin Lizzy, Clutch and Black Sabbath, also giving it a mixed review, He wrote, "at 40, one-time hardcore visionary Henry Rollins is a movie actor, host of Fox's anthology series Night Visions, an established spoken-word artist, an author and a poet. In the midst of all this multimedia action, he has continued to pump out Rollins Band discs, mostly with limited success. Nice is yet another mediocre Rollins album in a string of them." He went on to describe its sound as "blues-metal", and noted that it "avoids aging punk-cliches and nu metal conceits." A more positive review came from AllMusic's Chris True, who considered it an improvement over Get Some Go Again, writing that "[here] it sounds like Jim Mackenroth, Jim Wilson, and Marcus Blake had ideas of their own, and went for them 100 percent." True added that, "it may be shocking to hear female vocals or a horn section coming out from behind Rollins, but here it works splendidly." Ed Masley of the Pittsburgh Post-Gazette gave the album three out of five stars, and said that when compared to the band's earlier work, it was "more garage, less metal." Allison Linn of the Associated Press also noted the album's differences to the band's earlier material, she stated in September 2001 "bluesy backing vocalists and funky bass lines? Guns 'n' Roses-style guitar solos? Cover art featuring a woman dressed only in a few conspicuously placed dollar bills? Is this really the Rollins Band?". On September 20, 2001, Mark Jenkins of The Washington Post wrote that "Nice is not a total makeover, but it does attempt both musical diversification and a little attitude adjustment", adding that "Rollins is still protesting loudly, but his rants are now tempered by pro-hedonism lyrics and such musical touches as the gospel chorus of the funk-metal "Up for It," the pop backup vocals of the punk-metal 'Stop Look and Listen' and the jump-jazz rhythms of 'Let That Devil Out'".

=== Legacy ===
Louder Sound ranked it as the worst Rollins Band album in 2022.

== Track listing ==
No.	Title	Length
1.	"One Shot"	3:03
2.	"Up for It"	4:39
3.	"Gone Inside the Zero"	2:39
4.	"Hello"	3:04
5.	"What's the Matter Man"	2:58
6.	"Your Number Is One"	4:27
7.	"Stop Look and Listen"	1:48
8.	"I Want So Much More"	3:42
9.	"Hangin' Around"	5:25
10.	"Going Out Strange"	4:51
11.	"We Walk Alone"	3:59
12.	"Let That Devil Out"	4:21
Total length:		44:56

Bonus tracks

No.	Title	Length
13.	"Nowhere to Go but Inside"	3:02
14.	"Too Much Rock and Roll"	3:49
Total length:		51:47

Australian edition

No.	Title	Length
15.	"Soul Implant"	4:57
16.	"Marcus Has Evil in Him"	4:00
Total length:		60:44

== Personnel ==
Rollins Band

- Henry Rollins – vocals
- Jim Wilson – guitars
- Marcus Blake – bass
- Jason Mackenroth – drums, saxophone

with:

- Clif Norrell – trumpet
- Jackie Simley-Stevens, Valerie Pinkston, Maxayn Lewis, Sueann Carwell, Tyler Collins – backing vocals on "Up for It" and "I Want So Much More"

Technical

- Recorded at Cherokee Studios, Los Angeles, California
- Produced by Henry Rollins
- Engineered by Clif Norrell

== Charts ==
Chart performance for Nice
Chart (2001)	Peak position
Australian Albums (ARIA)	64
German Albums (Offizielle Top 100)	56
