= Come In and Burn =

Studio album by Rollins Band
- Released: March 25, 1997
- Genres: Alternative metal, post-hardcore, jazz rock
- Length: 50:15
- Label: DreamWorks
- Producer: Steve Thompson

Rollins Band chronology
Weight (1994)	Come In and Burn (1997)	Get Some Go Again (2000)

Singles from Come In and Burn
- 1. "Starve" Released: 1997; 2. "The End of Something" Released: 1997

Alternate cover
- Alternate German edition cover

Come In and Burn is the fifth full-length studio album by Rollins Band. Released in 1997 on DreamWorks Records, it is their major label debut. It is also the last album before vocalist Henry Rollins dissolved the band's "classic" lineup of guitarist Chris Haskett, bassist Melvin Gibbs, drummer Sim Cain and sound technician Theo Van Rock. Rollins later formed a new version of Rollins Band with musicians from Mother Superior, who provided his backing band from 1998 until 2006, when the classic Rollins Band lineup briefly reunited.

== Background ==
=== Legal dispute with Imago ===
The lead up to the making of the album was marred by a legal dispute between Henry Rollins and Imago Records, the label that had released the two prior Rollins Band albums. Rollins went on to sign with DreamWorks Records, a subdivision of the newly created film company DreamWorks Pictures, which also had subdivisions for animation, television and video games. He signed not only as a member of Rollins Band, but also as a spoken word artist. The legal dispute with Imago originated when Rollins Band were in the midst of promoting their previous record Weight. Imago had just lost their distribution deal with the major label BMG, which led to Rollins seeking a deal with another label. A month after choosing to join DreamWorks, Imago's president Terry Ellis filed a multi-million dollar lawsuit against DreamWorks and Rollins, claiming that the artist was still contractually bound to the label, and that he had only delivered two albums in an eight-album contract. Rollins believed that the contract with Imago was no longer valid, since he was expecting the label to go out of business. Weeks after the initial lawsuit, Rollins countersued Imago, claiming fraud and deceit on the label's part, and arguing that his contract with Imago was nullified when it lost its distribution deal with BMG. Rollins would spend a significant amount of his own money paying lawyers during the Imago lawsuit. The band were only able to start recording Come In and Burn after officially signing with DreamWorks, although the legal battle was still ongoing throughout the recording and by the time the album was released.

DreamWorks had first approached Rollins by giving him a call, with Rollins telling Billboard in February 1997 that "I went and met them with my manager [and] when you're sitting across from Mo Ostin, Michael Ostin, Lenny Waronker and David Geffen, they put together a pretty good case." Michael Ostin of DreamWorks told Billboard that he was drawn to the "creative vision" of Rollins, saying "I like the fact he's multidimensional — he does spoken word performances, he's an author, he has real depth to his career." Come In and Burn is often considered the major label debut of Rollins Band, although DreamWorks didn't have any ownership ties to the traditional major record labels or major film studios until 2003, when divisions of the company started being sold off. Rollins Band were among the first heavy acts to sign for DreamWorks Records, alongside Powerman 5000, whose DreamWorks debut Mega!! Kung Fu Radio was released a month earlier in 1997.

=== Writing and recording ===
Come In and Burn was the first and only Rollins Band album to be produced by Steve Thompson. The band and Thompson recorded around 19 to 22 songs, with pre-production occurring in New York City, and the recording itself taking place in Bearsville, New York. Chris Haskett later reflected, "in terms of sound quality, and the way the instruments sound on it – it’s the best record we made. But with that said, I also think the songs are overwritten. There was too much thinking. When we were working on it, we were in between labels. There was a big legal dispute between our old label and our new label. So we couldn’t record, we couldn’t do anything except go to the rehearsal room five days a week and work on music." At the time, Rollins said, "basically, I don't have a life. I don’t have any drug addictions to slow me down. I don’t have any dependency on alcohol and I don’t have a girlfriend or wife or children. The only thing that interests me is work." In a March 1997 interview, he added. "this stuff we worked like into the dirt, we wrote over thirty songs. We just went over these things with a fine tooth comb. To the point where we had to walk away from it. That's when we brought in the producer. Because we didn't even know if we had a record or not at this point." Rollins wrote over 50 different sets of lyrics for Come In and Burn, which is something he had never done before. His early working titles for the album were Claim Your Baggage and Baggage Claim, a reference to the overall lyrical content.

In a 1997 interview with Melody Maker, Rollins reflected, "for me, the real hard thing with this album was lyrically. There's a lot of areas where I don't go to; feelings I have and know very well. I can articulate them but I don't know if I really have the courage to go wear them on my sleeve every night. So, this time around, if there's one concept, it's change. Don't do the same damn thing you always do. You're now thirtysomething, you know tons about music, so take your music somewhere. That's why a song like 'All I Want' came about, where it's way more vulnerable."

In another 1997 interview with Metal Hammer, Rollins explained the lyrical content of the opening track "Shame", saying it "deals with things that have happened to me that I can't face and can't really talk about, and they've had a big impact on my life. Everyone has things they've said or done or been that they're ashamed of, I don't think anyone gets out clean. There's a lot of confusion and a lot of hurt in the rear-view mirror. Some of it, I've been able to face and some of it, I'm working towards. It's a process. But I know there are some things that eat me up and hurt, so I decided to write a song about it." He further added that "During a City" was inspired by his time in New York City during the making of the album. All the other members of the band were based in New York, whereas Rollins was based in Los Angeles. Rollins recalled in 1999, "Come In and Burn, lyrically, was pretty dark, but at that time I was pretty bummed out, living in Manhattan. All those songs — the lyrics were all written walking around Manhattan. Literally, just walking around with a notebook, sitting down in places, writing, coming up with ideas and just walking endlessly for miles all over Manhattan night to night." The song "Spilling Over the Side" describes meeting a stranger while experiencing loneliness. Rollins said, "it could be a guy meeting a girl in a bar — he starts talking to her and telling her way more than she wants to know. Three hours later, he realizes what a jerk he's been and goes home thinking how pathetic is that." "Saying Goodbye Again" is about the irrationality of people dying prematurely due to drug abuse, with the last verse referring to a deceased friend of Rollins who was a drummer for Los Angeles band Stains. According to Haskett, the song "Starve" was producer Steve Thompson's idea, and was intentionally less complex in arrangement than other songs on the album, recalling that Thompson said to "go play a hardcore song on dropped D". Haskett included "Neon" as among his ten favorite Rollins Band songs in a 2015 Louder Sound article, saying "'Neon' is up there with 'Burned Beyond Recognition' and 'Disconnect' as one of my favourites to play. It’s one of the better mixes of words and music we were writing."

== Musical style ==
Like with their last few releases, Come In and Burn has been labelled as a mixture of heavy metal, punk, funk and jazz, however it has a more pronounced jazz-influence than before. The Morning News reflected in 2008 that the band "defied categorization" by the time Come In and Burn was released. One of Steve Thompson's goals in producing the album was to have more of a focus on groove, since he wanted to emphasize the talents of their rhythm section, which included jazz bassist Melvin Gibbs. The band themselves claimed that they had set out to make songs gradually build, instead of "knocking out" listeners at the very beginning of them. Rollins said at the time, "I don't think it's necessary to explode from the first second on — then where do you go?", adding that "the songs have more dynamics and more build, and in that we brought in more color and hopefully more tension, so when the song does hit, it really hits you out of your seat."

== Touring ==
The Come In and Burn tour lasted from April 1997 to October 1997, covering North America, Europe, Australia and Japan. For the American leg, British band Skunk Anansie opened for Rollins Band. On the tour, they started playing older songs again, dating back to their 1987 debut Life Time. Their previous tour for Weight was shorter lived than the tour for Come in and Burn, and they had less variety in their setlists, since bassist Melvin Gibbs was still getting used to playing their songs. Overall, the band had a rotating list of 35 songs they'd play for the Come in and Burn tour. Regarding the older songs, Rollins said in a June 1997 interview with The Courier-News, "they're like old friends that I haven't seen in ages", adding "I just want lots of room to move around with the setlist and have fun." In 1997, the band made guest appearances on Later... with Jools Holland and Saturday Night Live, where they were introduced by guest host Pamela Anderson. Metal Injection ranked their Later... with Jools Holland performance of "On My Way to the Cage" as one of the "10 Greatest Metal Performances on British Television". Metal Insider included them and their Saturday Night Live performance of "Starve" on a list of the "Heaviest SNL Musical Guests". To further support the album, a conceptual music video was made for the single "The End of Something", directed by Gavin Bowden. The lead single "Starve" also had a video, directed by Modi Frank. At the time, she was the official videographer and live director for Rollins Band. The video for "Starve" included footage from the recording sessions, as well as live footage.

Following the tour, the lineup dissolved. In a September 1998 CMJ interview, Rollins said that the band were on indefinite hiatus, citing the lukewarm response to the Come In and Burn tour and the album itself. In a later interview with the publication, Rollins also claimed he and the band were diverging in musical paths during the making of Come In and Burn, and that he disliked how long they had spent working on it together. During 1998 Rollins had formed a band with a lineup featuring members of Mother Superior, performing a few low key concerts in the United States during that year. Rollins did not originally intend to use the Rollins Band moniker for this project, but his management insisted he do so. He has since said that he regrets this decision. Chris Haskett remembered, "at the end of 1997 we were really burnt out. I figured we would be on a break and then reconvene once everybody had cooled off and had a rest. But then in 1998 I started getting emails from fans telling me how excited they were that RB was coming to Chicago and a few other places. I knew Henry was doing stuff with Mother Superior but I thought that would just be a side project so there you go. So I found out I wasn't in the band via the internet." Prior to leaving Rollins Band, Haskett had released two instrumental solo albums, Language (1996) and Nonfiction (1997), continuing with his solo career afterwards. Shortly after leaving Rollins Band, Haskett also collaborated with David Bowie on his 1999 album Hours, and he later relocated to Australia.

== Release and promotion ==
Shortly after the album's release, the video for "Starve" appeared on MTV's alternative program 120 Minutes, as part of the March 30, 1997 episode. Rollins himself hosted the April 6, 1997 episode, which featured "Starve" again, along with the video for "Tearing", from 1992's The End of Silence. On June 29, 1997, the video for the second single "The End of Something" was shown on 120 Minutes.

Come In and Burn failed to replicate the commercial success of 1994's Weight, and as of 1999, had sold 96,000 units in the United States. Weight by comparison had sold 423,000 units as of 1996. The 12 songs from Come In and Burn were combined with various outtakes on a 2-disc release titled the Come In and Burn Sessions. It was put out by Rollins' own 2.13.61 label on February 22, 2005 (with a copyright date of 2004 on the back of the album). Up until 2023, the original album was not available on Spotify and other streaming platforms, with Rollins saying that this was since DreamWorks still owned the rights to it, despite folding as a record label in 2005 after absorbed into UMG/Geffen Records. Prior to 2023, the Come In and Burn Sessions were available on Spotify in some regions, but not the original version of the album released by DreamWorks. Come In and Burn and its DreamWorks successor Get Some Go Again (2000) have currently never received vinyl releases.

== Reception ==
Professional ratings
Review scores
Source	Rating
AllMusic	3/5 stars
Collector's Guide to Heavy Metal	8/10
MusicHound Rock	4/5 stars
NME	5/10
Pitchfork	3.5/10
Rolling Stone	3/5 stars
Spin	4/10
Stereo Review	4/5 stars
The Village Voice	C−
Wall of Sound	76/100

The album received generally mixed reviews from critics, with some praising the musicianship but criticizing the presence of Henry Rollins. Reviewing for The Village Voice in December 1997, Robert Christgau said "this thrash-and-churn is [Rollins'] metalest metal ever", but regarded its lyrical content as "melodrama" concocted from "an adolescent despair [remembered] via groupies and fan mail". Bill Meredith of AllMusic commented that "not everyone agreed with [Rollins] decision to break up his band after the experimental 1997 Come in and Burn CD" and described the music as a mixture of "rock and funk, jazz/fusion, and metal". Stephen Thompson of The A.V. Club mentioned that the album contained a "surprisingly bottom-heavy mix [and] chunky guitars." Stereo Review similarly said in June 1997 that "lead guitarist Chris Haskett gets the biggest and chunkiest tones he's ever had." Rolling Stone in 1997 compared it to the Helmet album Aftertaste, which was released a week earlier, and which would also turn out to be the last album with most of their original lineup. The review remarks, "Helmet's Aftertaste and the Rollins Band's Come In and Burn are prime examples of the '90s brand of paramilitary headbanging. With their drillsergeant demeanors and drill-press riffs, the Rollins Band and Helmet typify this Spartan approach to hard rock."

Canadian magazine RPM wrote in their review that Rollins is, "incredibly intelligent and highly articulate – something that comes through in songs like 'Inhale Exhale', 'Rejection', 'Shame' and 'On My Way to the Cage'", while music site Brainwashed observed that, "bass player Melvin Gibbs was the new guy for Weight, but now he's an integral part of the band. The rhythm section really shines thanks to the open arrangements on many of the songs." Tom Sinclair of Entertainment Weekly stated that Gibbs, Haskett and Cain had "perfected a truly massive two-parts-metal/one-part-fusion musical onslaught". However, he was more critical of Rollins, remarking "Come In and Burn finds him again melodramatically declaiming lyrics that sound like transcriptions from a therapy session, over his band’s patented, jazz-tinged Uberrock. Burn begins with 'Shame', ends with 'Rejection', and in between covers anomie, loneliness, dysfunction, and low self-esteem." Sinclair added, "at the close of 'Thursday Afternoon', a woman’s voice is heard saying, 'When I’m around animals or children, my problems don’t seem as intense.' A session with Burn may prove more effective than either kittens or kids for putting one's worries in perspective." James P. Wisdom of Pitchfork gave it only a 3.5 out of 10. He pondered, "what happened after The End of Silence that fucked up Rollins' music? To follow such a powerful album with this terrible record is criminal." Mark Schone of Spin also had a negative review in May 1997, criticizing Rollins' "sweaty brand of metal" and dismissing the lyrical content as "just another Spartan chapter of the Rollins self-help manual."

=== Legacy ===
In May 2000, news publication New Times Broward-Palm Beach labelled the album "underrated", and claimed that the follow-up Get Some Go Again did not have the same "rebellious gusto". On Come In and Burn's 20th anniversary in 2017, Diffuser.fm wrote that "from the opening swirl of 'Shame,' the music is tighter, darker and more atmospheric than its predecessors." PunkNews.org wrote in 2017 that "the musical progression on this release is certainly worth noting, the jazz-metal fusion on this album is amongst some of the most interesting hard rock churned out in the 90's". In 2022, Louder Sound placed Come In and Burn fourth in their ranking of the seven Rollins Band studio albums. It ranked ahead of 1989's Hard Volume and the two subsequent albums with the Mother Superior lineup.

Regarding the album's lack of success, Haskett said, "'The End of Something', it doesn’t grab you. There was no single. There was nothing to hook people with. Even after the record was finished Melvin and I said something like 'Let us go away and write something very quick!'. And we did try but it got no traction. So the record came out with nothing for people to grab onto. It’s still a great record [but] It was a harder thing to tour on [and] it was a harder thing to get people’s attention with." He also said, "the songs are too complex... I mean, they’re great, compositionally they’re amazing. But Henry’s strength comes from kind of clean simplicity. If you make the background behind his vocals too complex, it kind of dilutes the power of his voice."

== Track listing ==
1. "Shame" – 5:32
2. "Starve" – 4:08
3. "All I Want" – 4:41
4. "The End of Something" – 4:50
5. "On My Way to the Cage" – 3:20
6. "Thursday Afternoon" – 4:04
7. "During a City" – 3:39
8. "Neon" – 4:28
9. "Spilling Over the Side" – 3:44
10. "Inhale Exhale" – 3:39
11. "Saying Goodbye Again" – 3:34
12. "Rejection" – 4:37
13. "Rollins Band Interactive" (1997 enhanced CD bonus)
14. "Disappearing Act" (European and Japanese edition bonus track) – 3:40
15. "Also Ran" (Japanese edition bonus track) – 3:42

=== Come In and Burn Sessions reissue (2005) ===
CD 1:

1. "Shame"
2. "Starve"
3. "All I Want"
4. "The End of Something"
5. "On My Way to the Cage"
6. "Thursday Afternoon"
7. "Also Ran"
8. "During a City"
9. "Neon"
10. "Threshold"
11. "Spilling Over the Side"

CD 2:

1. "Inhale Exhale"
2. "Saying Goodbye Again"
3. "Rejection"
4. "Disappearing Act"
5. "Stray"
6. "Unknown Hero"
7. "During a City (alt.)"
8. "Destroying the World"
9. "E.O.S." (Grooverider remix)
10. "E.O.S." (We Change Fear remix)

== Personnel ==
Rollins Band

- Henry Rollins – vocals
- Sim Cain – drums
- Melvin Gibbs – bass
- Chris Haskett – guitar

Technical

- Theo Van Rock – Rök Juicer, Low End Ranger
- Steve Thompson – producer
- Clif Norrell – engineer, mixing

== Charts ==
Chart performance for Come In and Burn
Chart (1997)	Peak position
Australian Albums (ARIA)	38
Dutch Albums (Album Top 100)	76
Finnish Albums (Suomen virallinen lista)	31
German Albums (Offizielle Top 100)	71
Swedish Albums (Sverigetopplistan)	52
Swiss Albums (Schweizer Hitparade)	49
UK Albums (Official Charts)	76
US Billboard 200	89
