= Get Some Go Again Sessions =

Studio album by Rollins Band
- Released: 2005
- Recorded: 2000
- Genre: Alternative/Punk
- Length: 2 h 10 min
- Label: 2.13.61
- Producer: Henry Rollins

Rollins Band chronology
Come In and Burn Sessions (2004)	Get Some Go Again Sessions (2005)

Get Some Go Again Sessions is a 2005 double album by the Rollins Band, although on this release it is credited to Henry Rollins & Mother Superior.

This album contains the original Get Some Go Again album plus the remaining tracks from session (previously released on their own as Yellow Blues), as well as two live tracks and two videos. The original concept for Get Some Go Again album was this two disc set, but DreamWorks would not release it. This led Rollins to reissue the title on his own label after parting company with DreamWorks, which he calls "not a very good label" in the album's liner notes.

== Track listing ==
=== Disc 1 ===
1. "Get Some Go Again" (Rollins Band) - 2:12
2. "Monster" (Rollins Band) - 3:03
3. "Love Is So Heavy" (Rollins Band) - 3:53
4. "Illumination" (Rollins Band) - 4:11
5. "Thinking Cap" (Rollins Band) - 4:11
6. "Change It Up" (Rollins Band) - 3:03
7. "I Go Day Glo" (Rollins Band) - 1:45
8. "Are You Ready?" (Scott Gorham, Phil Lynott)- 2:43
9. "On The Day" (Rollins Band) - 3:44
10. "You Let Yourself Down" (Rollins Band) - 2:46
11. "Brother Interior" (Rollins Band) - 5:39
12. "Hotter And Hotter" (Rollins Band, Wayne Kramer) - 3:50
13. "LA Money Train" (Rollins Band) - 14:13
14. "Side By Side" (Rollins Band) - 3:08
15. "Frozen Man" (Rollins Band) - 3:17
16. "100 Miles" (Rollins Band) - 4:16
17. "Summer Nights" (Rollins Band) - 4:44
18. "Action" (Rollins Band) - 4:58

=== Disc 2 ===
1. "Yellow Blues" (Rollins Band) - 6:19
2. "Don't Let This Be" (Rollins Band) - 4:29
3. "Coma" (Rollins Band) - 8:26
4. "Hold On" (Rollins Band) - 10:03
5. "Hell's Lounge Band Unwinds" (Rollins Band) - 11:12
6. "Illumination" (Ben Grosse Mix) (Rollins Band, Ben Grosse) - 4:03
7. "Fuck Yo Momma" (Rollins Band) - 5:59
8. "What Have I Got" (Live) (Rollins Band) - 5:08
9. "Action" (Live) (Rollins Band) - 5:46
10. "Get Some Go Again Video" (Rollins Band) - 2:25
11. "Electronic Press Kit" (Rollins Band) - 5:36

== Personnel ==
Rollins Band

- Jason Mackenroth - drums, saxophone
- Jim Wilson - guitar, piano
- Henry Rollins - vocals
- Marcus Blake - bass

with:

- Brian Kehew - keyboards on "Hold On"
- Wayne Kramer - additional guitar on "Hotter And Hotter" and "LA Money Train"
- Scott Gorham - additional guitar on "Are You Ready?"

Technical

- Clif Norrell - recording, mixing
