= Weight (album) =

Studio album by Rollins Band
- Released: April 12, 1994
- Recorded: December 1993
- Studio: Echo Creek Ranch (Meyers, California)
- Genre: Alternative metal
- Length: 53:26
- Label: Imago
- Producer: Theo Van Rock

Rollins Band chronology
The End of Silence (1992)	Weight (1994)	Come In and Burn (1997)

Singles from Weight
- 1. "Liar" Released: 1994; 2. "Disconnect" Released: 1994

Alternate cover
- Alternate promo edition cover

Weight is the fourth studio album by American rock band Rollins Band, released on April 12, 1994. It featured the band's biggest hits, "Liar" and "Disconnect".

== Writing and recording ==
The songs for the album were written throughout 1993, after the band completed touring for their previous release The End of Silence. The writing for the songs took place in East Village, Manhattan, since all of the members of the band lived in New York, with the exception of Henry Rollins, who was based in Los Angeles. Rollins has said that he conceived several song lyrics and musical ideas on his way to band practice in New York. In a 1997 interview, he further recalled that "a lot of the initial songs, like a big hunk of them, were written really fast. 'Volume 4', 'Fool', 'Disconnect', and 'Liar' were written in like two days. Then there's another burst that gave us another hunk. Then they were groomed, argued over, mantled, dismantled, different bridge sections put in. Then the rest of the record took the rest of the summer into the fall." Rollins Band played a small number of shows during 1993, where they previewed some of the new material they had been writing. They then recorded Weight during a snowy December 1993 in Echo Creek Ranch, in Meyers, California. While recording the album in Echo Creek Ranch, Rollins was interviewed by MTV, and said "we recorded the album out here at this log cabin in the middle of nowhere because it enabled us to make a lot of noise night and day and not worry about neighbors. We could go seven days a week as many hours as we wanted and hopefully create a very free musical atmosphere and that's why we did it." Rollins added that, "having recorded in this cabin like this in a very kind of homey atmosphere, I wouldn't want to go back to a studio again."

== Music and influences ==
In May 1994, Spin described the album as a mix of rap, punk, funk, metal and jazz, also calling it a "far cry" from Henry Rollins' previous band Black Flag. It was produced by the band's long-time sound technician, the Dutch-born Theo Van Rock. Around this time, Van Rock was often being credited as a fifth member of the band, despite playing no instruments, and even appeared in the music video for "Liar" and in several photo shoots alongside the other members. When asked about Weight, Van Rock told MTV that, "the sound of the album is warm, open and honest. Henry's been known as somebody who's like very strong in his, let's say screaming, and now we are doing the singing thing as well."

For the album, bassist Andrew Weiss was replaced by Melvin Gibbs, known at the time for his jazz work. The Encyclopedia of Popular Music, by music critic Colin Larkin, described Gibbs as adding a stronger funk influence to the band's sound, with songs such as "Liar" and "Tired" also drawing heavily from jazz. Rollins Band would go on to incorporate even more jazz elements on their next album, 1997's Come In and Burn, before stripping down their sound on 2000's Get Some Go Again, which had the entire backing band replaced. In his 1994 book The Virgin Rock Yearbook 1994-1995, British author Tony Horkins wrote that with Weight, Rollins Band were delving into the funk metal genre, which was popular in the early 1990s. The songs on 1992's The End of Silence were all written in 1988, before the style was as prevalent in the mainstream. Gibbs was recommended to Rollins by Vernon Reid, who was a member of the all-black funk metal band Living Colour. Rollins talked about the influence Gibbs had on the band's sound in 1993, saying, "having an new member in the band, Melvin Gibbs on bass, has really changed things. He and the drummer, Sim Cain, together have formed this really amazing rhythm alliance." Gibbs noted that he had some familiarity with progressive rock and hardcore punk bands such as Bad Brains, but that he had only become familiar with heavy metal music much more recently. He remembered in 2011 that, "the big joke of the Rollins Band was how little I actually knew about rock music, and metal in particular. One of the reasons was, when I was growing up, that was the Do the Right Thing era in Brooklyn and essentially any kid who wore a Black Sabbath t-shirt was going to call me the N-word, and I was going to have to fight him. So that was my association of heavy metal music – a bunch of racist dudes that I was going to end up in a fistfight with." He added, "later I found out that they actually are a really great band, but at that time I didn’t really listen to them. I actually got into metal in the '80s when I was working at Tower Records." According to Gibbs, Rollins was being heavily influenced by the stoner rock band Sleep around the making of Weight, which led to him becoming a fan of the style as well. Gibbs said he stopped following heavy metal music as closely after leaving the Rollins Band at the end of 1997, but that he still continued to listen to several stoner rock bands.

=== Lyrical content ===
"Liar" has been described as being written from the perspective of a manipulative male character, although Rollins refuted this in a May 1994 interview with MTV's Headbangers Ball, saying, "the person in the song isn't necessarily a guy. Everyone has manipulated someone else to get to the desired endpoint. Everyone has. Guys, girls. And everyone has felt very lonely and open to being pulled around, and convinced and lied to. Guys do it to girls, girls do it to guys. It happens all the way around. So it's not about a guy doing a thing to a girl, it's about what people do to each other." In this same interview, Rollins described the closing track "Shine" as the most positive song on the album, and said that it revolved around "triumph [and] standing up." "Volume 4" is dedicated to Rollins' friend Joe Cole, a roadie for Black Flag and Rollins Band, who was shot and killed in an armed robbery on December 19, 1991.

== Touring and promotion ==
In support of Weight, Rollins Band went on a 24-date American tour with Helmet and the Les Claypool project Sausage. The tour with Helmet and Sausage lasted between July and August 1994, with all of the shows being recorded.

The video for "Liar" was directed by Dutch photographer Anton Corbijn in a desert location and featured Rollins dressed as a devil, a nun, Superman and a police officer, with the latter three being meant to represent "icons of truth". The video was heavily featured on MTV's alternative program 120 Minutes and the metal program Headbangers Ball. It gained further popularity after appearing on a 1994 Beavis and Butt-Head episode titled "Liar! Liar!". Another video from the album, "Disconnect", appeared twice on the series, first in the 1995 episode "Top o' the Mountain", then as part of the episode "Shortcuts" in March 1997 (the same month the band's follow-up Come In and Burn was released). The song "Civilized" was also used as the closing theme for Dennis Miller Live from 1994–2002 on HBO.

== Release ==
It had sold 423,000 units in the United States as of 1996, making it their most commercially successful release, and one of the most successful releases of Imago Records. In 2004, a companion album titled Weighting was released on Rollins' own 2.13.61 label. It featured Weight-era live recordings and B-sides, as well as songs from an unreleased 1993 album the band had made with free jazz saxophonist Charles Gayle. Due to rights issues with Imago, Weight was previously not available on Spotify in the United States and other territories. Up until 2023, Come In and Burn was also not available on Spotify due to similar rights issues with the band's next record label, DreamWorks.

== Reception ==
Professional ratings
Review scores
Source	Rating
AllMusic	4/5 stars
Christgau's Consumer Guide	(dud)
Collector's Guide to Heavy Metal	8/10
Entertainment Weekly	A−
Los Angeles Times	3/4 stars
MusicHound Rock	4/5 stars
Rolling Stone	4/5 stars
Spin Alternative Record Guide	7/10

The album received positive reviews from critics, and In 1995, "Liar" was nominated for the Grammy Award for Best Metal Performance. Stephen Thomas Erlewine of AllMusic gave it a four out of five star rating, saying "on Weight, the Rollins Band is able to mix the musicians' love for jazz with a blindingly direct hard rock assault, making a twisted form of metal-jazz." He also described Weight as lyrically adding some of the more down to earth elements from Rollins' spoken word career, which were not present on the earlier albums, which Erlewine considered to be solely about "relentless self-examination". Richard Cromelin of The Los Angeles Times awarded it a three out of four rating, saying in April 1994 that "[Rollins] is like a martial-arts hero of the psychic terrain, and his war with hypocrisy and repression is played out on a scale that’s both intimate and larger than life — his feelings are too intense and colossal to be conveyed in conventional terms, so his bellow is super human, and his band plays its deliberate sludge-metal riffs with crushing power." Deborah Frost of Entertainment Weekly gave it an A− rating in April 1994, saying "the guitarist’s heavy-metal cliches never quite rise to frontman Rollins’ or new bassist Melvin Gibbs’ Richter-scale rumbling. Still, [it's] a near masterpiece." Orla Swift of the Record Journal listed it as one of the best albums of the year in December 1994, observing that "the addition of new bassist Melvin Gibbs gives the band a more fluid sound and allows guitarist Chris Haskett's divebombing guitar to be heard." Mark Jenkins of The Washington Post wrote in August 1994 that "[Rollins] imagines himself the Jean Genet of punk-metal. He may be 'high on your poison,' but what makes this album more interesting than most Rollins releases is not its Dionysian intensity — that's standard — but its unaccustomed musical variety. Speaker-rattling bassist Melvin Gibbs introduces a contrapuntal funkiness to the quartet's slamming hard rock."

The Michigan Daily also praised the addition of Gibbs, writing "jazz bassist Melvin Gibbs is the perfect compliment behind Rollins' savagely honest lyrics." In an August 1994 review of a Rollins Band concert with Helmet and Sausage, Jeff Vice of the Deseret News wrote "heavy metal just keeps getting weirder and weirder", adding that "alternative metal act Rollins Band [plays] near jazz/metal." In October 1994, the Manila Standard's review stated, "for Weight, Rollins Band's second recording, Rollins and cohorts carry on with their traditional mettle of diverse-paced yet always heavy, non-traditional metal, supported by lyrics that realize Rollins' apparent thematic objective: to inject some self-assuring sense into the listener, those who may be attracted to the noise as a source of escape from self-demeaning reality." The Beaver County Times labelled it the band's "most proactive album" in May 1994, saying "poet, author and rock icon Henry Rollins — whose band laid the groundwork for the current 'message metal' — has some advice for the angst-ridden: Stop whining about systemic oppression; change is up to the individual."

=== Legacy ===
In his 1998 book, Turned on: A Biography of Henry Rollins author James Parker reflected, "Rollins Band's Weight, released the month of Cobain's death, sounded like a retort to grunge, a slapdown — its grooves had the weight, not of collapse, but of a muscled certainty." Spin wrote in 2000 that this album and Come In and Burn saw Rollins "play self-help drill sergeant against the atonal guitar riffs and Frankenstein grooves blueprinted [on] 1988's Life Time. Rolling Stone placed it 25th on a 2014 list titled "1994: The 40 Best Records From Mainstream Alternative’s Greatest Year", saying that "In the seven years since Rollins formed his eponymous band, the group had evolved into a jazz-metal hybrid with tight grooves that could either play it cool or sizzle and seethe along with him." In 2016, Metal Hammer included it on their "10 essential alt-metal albums" list. Louder Sound ranked it as the best Rollins Band album in 2022.

=== Accolades ===
Year	Publication	Country	Accolade	Rank
1994	Metal Hammer	United Kingdom	"Albums of the Year"	7
1994	Melody Maker	United Kingdom	"Albums of the Year"	34
1994	Sounds	Germany	"Albums of the Year"	47
1995	RAW	United Kingdom	"90 Essential Albums for the 90s"	*
"*" denotes an unordered list.

== Track listing ==
All songs are credited to the Rollins Band.

1. "Disconnect" – 4:57
2. "Fool" – 4:26
3. "Icon" – 3:41
4. "Civilized" – 3:54
5. "Divine Object of Hatred" – 4:01
6. "Liar" – 6:34
7. "Step Back" – 3:58
8. "Wrong Man" – 4:19
9. "Volume 4" – 4:39
10. "Tired" – 3:46
11. "Alien Blueprint" – 3:45
12. "Shine" – 5:26

== Personnel ==
=== Rollins Band ===
- Henry Rollins – vocals
- Chris Haskett – guitar
- Melvin Gibbs – bass
- Sim Cain – drums

=== Production ===
- Theo Van Rock – production
- David Bianco – mixing
- John Jackson – mixing
- Peter Rave – recording
- Brant Scott – recording
- Rob Sieffert – recording
- Howie Weinberg – mastering

== Charts ==
Album

Chart (1994)	Peak position
Australian Albums (ARIA)	10
Dutch Albums (Album Top 100)	35
German Albums (Offizielle Top 100)	53
New Zealand Albums (RMNZ)	26
Swedish Albums (Sverigetopplistan)	29
UK Albums (Official Charts)	22
US Billboard 200	33

Singles

Year	Title	Peak chart positions				
Year	Title	US Main	US Mod	AUS	NLD	UK
1994	"Disconnect"	—	—	—	—	27
1994	"Liar"	40	26	65	28	27
"—" denotes singles that were released but did not chart.
