= Drive by Shooting =

EP by Henrietta Collins & The Wife-Beating Child-Haters
- Released: 1987
- Recorded: October 1986
- Length: 19:33
- Label: Texas Hotel
- Producer: Geoff Clout, Norm

Henrietta Collins & The Wife-Beating Child-Haters chronology
Hot Animal Machine (1987)	Drive by Shooting (1987)	Life Time (1987)

Professional ratings
Review scores
Source	Rating
AllMusic	3.5/5 stars

Drive by Shooting is a solo EP by American hardcore punk musician Henry Rollins, credited as Henrietta Collins and The Wifebeating Childhaters. The EP served as a precursor to the Rollins Band.

This recording is a mix of original songs and Rollins' versions of material by others. There is a cover of "Ex Lion Tamer" originally by the UK punk band Wire and a re-vision of a Queen's "We Will Rock You" with different lyrics. The title song is a parody of a cheery 1960s Beach Boys-style song as written by a violent street gang ("We're gonna get in our car / Gonna go go go / Gonna drive to a neighborhood / Kill someone we don't know.")

The recording is exclusively available now in a double CD package with Hot Animal Machine, Rollins' first full-length solo recording.

== Track listing ==
1. "Drive by Shooting" (Henry Rollins, Chris Haskett) – 2:01
2. "Ex-Lion Tamer" (Graham Lewis, Colin Newman) – 1:54
3. "Hey Henrietta" (Rollins) – 3:00
4. "Can You Speak This?" (Haskett) – 2:00
5. "I Have Come to Kill You" (Rollins) – 5:21
6. "Men Are Pigs" (Rollins) – 2:38
7. "The Road Song" (re-titled "There's a Man Outside (Reprise)" on the 2002 re-release) (Rollins, Haskett) – 2:36

=== Original vinyl release ===
1. "Drive by Shooting" – 2:01
2. "Ex-Lion Tamer" (Lewis, Newman; Wire) – 1:54
3. "Black and White" (instrumental mix)
4. "Hey Henrietta" – 3:00
5. "Can You Speak This?" – 2:00
6. "I Have Come to Kill You" – 5:21
7. "Men Are Pigs" – 2:38
- "Black and White" is not listed on the sleeve or label

== Personnel ==
- Henry Rollins – vocals
- Chris Haskett – guitar
- Bernie Wandel – bass guitar
- Mick Green – drums
