= Do It (EP) =

1987 EP by Rollins Band

EP with live tracks by Rollins Band
- Released: 1987; 2007 (re-issue)
- Recorded: Off Beat Studios, Leeds, UK; Kortrijk, Belgium; Deventer, Netherlands; London, England; Ravensburg, Germany
- Genre: Post-hardcore
- Length: 34:39; 69:37 (re-issue)
- Label: Texas Hotel; 2.13.61 (re-issue)
- Producer: Ian MacKaye

Rollins Band chronology
| Life Time (1987) | Do It (1987) | Hard Volume (1989) |

Professional ratings
Review scores
| Source | Rating |
|---|---|
| Spin Alternative Record Guide | 6/10 |

Do It is the first EP after the first full-length album Life Time from Rollins Band, fronted by ex-Black Flag singer Henry Rollins.

Do It was originally released in 1987 and included three studio recordings (1–3) and 6 live tracks recorded in Deventer, Netherlands October 22, 1987 (5–10). The three studio tracks are Pink Fairies, Velvet Underground and Louis Prima & Sam Butera covers, produced by Ian MacKaye, well known in the genre of hardcore punk for his work with Minor Threat and as co-owner of the Dischord record label.

The record was subsequently re-mastered and re-released in 2007 with additional live tracks from the Fall 1987 Tour. These include the addition of the introductory track titled "Joe Is Everything, Everything Is Joe" (which refers to Rollins' roommate Joe Cole, who was murdered in 1991 when they were victims of an armed robbery), two live tracks from Kortrijk, Belgium (11–12), two live tracks from London, England (13–14) and the final track from Ravensburg, Germany (15). Six more tracks from the same tour can be found on the rare Split Live LP with the Dutch noise band Gore from a show recorded at El Mocambo in Toronto, Canada on May 17, 1987. The three studio tracks were also included in the re-mastered package of the Life Time album.

== Track listing ==
1. "Do It" (Pink Fairies cover) – 2:43
2. "Move Right in" (Velvet Underground cover) – 7:27
3. "Next Time" (Louis Prima & Sam Butera cover) – 3:20
4. "Joe Is Everything, Everything Is Joe" (live) – 1:17
5. "Black and White" (live) – 3:46
6. "Lost and Found" (live) – 2:48
7. "Followed Around" (live) – 3:53
8. "Wreck Age" (live) – 4:18
9. "Lonely" (live) – 3:52
10. "Hot Animal Machine I" (live) – 2:39
11. "You Look at You" (live) – 3:22
12. "Gun in Mouth Blues" (live) – 11:14
13. "Turned Out" (live) – 5:40
14. "Thousand Times Blind" (live) – 3:03
15. "No One" (live) – 10:22

== Personnel ==
Rollins Band

- Henry Rollins – vocals
- Chris Haskett – guitar
- Andrew Weiss – bass
- Sim Cain – drums

Technical

- Studio tracks produced by Ian MacKaye
- Live sound by Theo Van Eenbergen
- Engineered and mixed by Geoff Clout at Off Beat Studios, Leeds, UK, November 1987
