= Hot Animal Machine =

Studio album by Henry Rollins
- Released: 1987
- Recorded: October 1986 at Off Beat Studios, Leeds, England, UK
- Length: 35:33
- Label: Texas Hotel
- Producers: Chris Haskett, Henry Rollins

Henry Rollins chronology
| Hot Animal Machine (1987) | Drive by Shooting (1987) |

Professional ratings
Review scores
| Source | Rating |
|---|---|
| Allmusic | 3/5 stars |

Hot Animal Machine is the debut solo album by Henry Rollins which served as a precursor to the Rollins Band. It is only available now in the same 2-in-one package as Drive by Shooting. It is notable for a number of cover songs; Suicide's "Ghost Rider", Richard Berry's "Crazy Lover" and The Velvet Underground's "I'm Gonna Move Right In". The cover art was drawn by Mark Mothersbaugh, the frontman of the popular 1980s group Devo.

== Track listing ==
Side one
| No. | Title | Writer(s) | Length |
|---|---|---|---|
| 1. | "Black and White" | Henry Rollins, Chris Haskett | 3:01 |
| 2. | "Followed Around" | Rollins, Haskett, Bernie Wandel, Mick Green | 2:48 |
| 3. | "Lost and Found" | Rollins, Haskett, Wandel | 2:04 |
| 4. | "There's a Man Outside" | Rollins, Haskett | 3:13 |
| 5. | "Crazy Lover" | Richard Berry | 2:33 |
| 6. | "Man and a Woman" | Rollins, Wandel | 3:59 |

Side two
| No. | Title | Writer(s) | Length |
|---|---|---|---|
| 1. | "Hot Animal Machine 1" | Rollins, Haskett | 3:01 |
| 2. | "Ghost Rider" (Suicide cover) | Martin Rev, Alan Vega | 2:27 |
| 3. | "Move Right In" (The Velvet Underground cover) | John Cale, Sterling Morrison, Lou Reed, Maureen Tucker; additional lyrics by Rollins | 2:43 |
| 4. | "Hot Animal Machine 2" | Rollins, Haskett | 3:31 |
| 5. | "No One" | Rollins, Haskett | 6:03 |

== Accolades ==
| Publication | Country | Accolade | Year | Rank |
|---|---|---|---|---|
| Spex | Germany | Albums of the Year | 1987 | 1 |

== Personnel ==
Musicians

- Mick Green – drums
- Chris Haskett – electric guitar, production
- Henry Rollins – vocals, production
- Bernie Wandel – bass guitar

Technical personnel

- Geoff Clout – engineering, mixing
- John Golden – mastering
- Mark Mothersbaugh – illustrations

== Release history ==
| Region | Date | Label | Format | Catalog |
|---|---|---|---|---|
| Germany | 1986 | What's So Funny About... | LP | SF 54 |
| United Kingdom | 1987 | Fundamental | LP | SAVE 24 |
| United States | 1987 | Kill Rock Stars | CS, LP | TXH 002 |
