= The End of Something (song) =

Single by Rollins Band

from the album Come In and Burn
- B-side: "Also Ran"
- Released: 1997
- Studio: Bearsville Studios (Woodstock, New York); Sorcerer Sound (New York City, New York)
- Genre: Alternative metal
- Length: 4:58
- Label: DreamWorks
- Songwriters: Sim Cain; Melvin Gibbs; Chris Haskett; Henry Rollins
- Producer: Steve Thompson

Rollins Band singles chronology
"Disconnect" (1994)	"The End of Something" (1997)

Alternative cover
- 1997 promo cover

"The End of Something" is a song by Rollins Band. It is the second single released in support of their fifth album Come In and Burn.

== Formats and track listing ==
All songs written by Sim Cain, Melvin Gibbs, Chris Haskett and Henry Rollins

US 7" single (22271)

1. "The End of Something" (LP Version) – 4:50
2. "Also Ran" – 3:12

US CD single (22271)

1. "The End of Something" (LP Version) – 4:50
2. "The End of Something" (We Change Fear Remix) – 4:34
3. "Threshold" (Previously Unreleased in the UK) – 9:10

UK CD single (22271)

1. "The End of Something" (LP Version) – 4:50
2. "The End of Something" (We Change Fear Remix) – 4:50
3. "Stray" – 3:40

Australian CD single (22258)

1. "The End of Something" (LP Version) – 4:50
2. "Also Ran" – 3:12
3. "The End of Something" (Remix) – 4:52

== Charts ==
Chart (1997)	Peak position
UK Singles (OCC)	77

== Release history ==
Region	Date	Label	Format	Catalog
Europe	1997	DreamWorks	CD	22258
United Kingdom	1997	DreamWorks	CD	22271
United States	1997	DreamWorks	7"	5020
