= Jim Wilson (guitarist) =

American rock musician

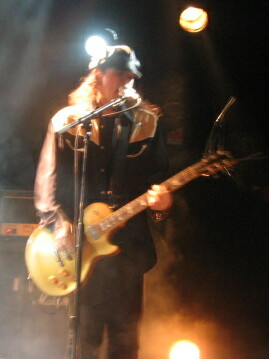
- Wilson performing with Mother Superior

Background information
- Born: James Wilson; Delaware, U.S.
- Genres: Blues rock; experimental; heavy metal; hardcore punk; alternative rock; post-punk; noise rock; folk rock; funk
- Occupation: Musician
- Instruments: Guitar; vocals; bass; piano
- Member of: Motor Sister
- Formerly of: Mother Superior; Rollins Band

James Wilson is an American musician and singer, best known as a guitarist in the rock bands Mother Superior and Rollins Band. He is known for his soulful vocals and powerful blues rock guitar work. He also plays guitar and bass with Daniel Lanois. Wilson hails from Delaware, but currently resides in Los Angeles.

== Biography ==
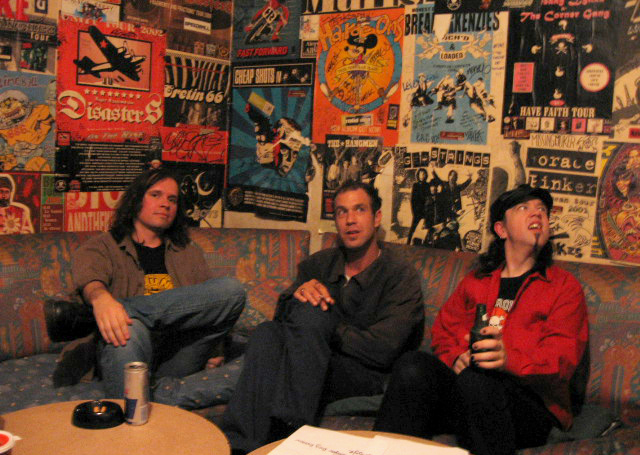
Wilson (right) with Mother Superior in 2006

Wilson was born in Delaware. A founding member of the blues rock trio Mother Superior who as a band have worked with Lemmy, Queens of the Stone Age, Alice Cooper, Meat Loaf, Emmylou Harris, Anthrax, Wayne Kramer, George Clinton, and Iggy Pop. They were also approached by Henry Rollins in 1999 and asked to become 3/4 of the Rollins Band, an offer they accepted. Mother Superior released their eighth studio album Three Headed Dog in 2007. Along with the other members of Mother Superior, Wilson has recorded and appeared with Daniel Lanois in 2006, 2007, 2011 and 2014.

Wilson has also made live appearances with Sparks, notably in 2008 during the Sparks Spectacular, where they played each of their 21 albums in their entirety over 21 nights in London. His first collaboration with Sparks was during the 2004 Meltdown Festival in London, curated by Morrissey, where Sparks were invited to play the complete albums "Kimono My House" (1974) and "Lil' Beethoven" (2002). Wilson also played on the 2006 album "Hello Young Lovers".

He toured with Daniel Lanois and has taken back the mantle of lead singer for Motor Sister, a project of his with rhythm guitarist Scott Ian, bassist Joey Vera, drummer John Tempesta, and vocalist Pearl Aday.

== Discography ==
Mother Superior

Release date	Title	Label	Notes
1993	Right in a Row	None	Self produced eight song recording
1996	The Heavy Soul Experience	Top Beat Records	
1997	Kaleidescope	Top Beat Records	
1998	Deep	Top Beat Records	Japanese version 1999 – Crown Records
2001	Mother Superior	Triple X Records	
2002	Sin	Muscletone Records	Euro version 2003 – Fargo
2004	13 Violets	Top Beat Records	Euro version 2004 – Fargo
2005	Moanin	Bad Reputation	First record with Matt Tecu on drums.
2007	Three Headed Dog	Rosa Records	
2008	Grande	Kicking Records	

With Rollins Band

Release date	Title	Label	Notes
2000	Get Some Go Again	DreamWorks	The single "Get Some Go Again" was released in 2000. (B-side of "Don't Let This Be").
2000	A Clockwork Orange Stage	2.13.61 Records	Live at the Roskilde Festival, Denmark, July 1, 2000.
2001	Yellow Blues	2.13.61 Records	Out-takes from Get Some Go Again sessions.
2001	Nice	Sanctuary Records	
2001	A Nicer Shade Of Red	2.13.61 Records	Out-takes from Nice.
2002	The Only Way To Know For Sure	Sanctuary Records	2 discs. Recorded live at The Metro in Chicago on March 1 & 2, 2002.
2002	Rise Above	Sanctuary Records	24 Black Flag songs to benefit the West Memphis Three

With Motor Sister

Release date	Title	Label	Notes
2015	Ride	Metal Blade	Motor Sister consists of Jim Wilson, Anthrax's Scott Ian, Pearl Aday, Armored Saint's Joey Vera, and The Cult's John Tempesta.
