= Sin (album) =

Studio album by Mother Superior
- Released: 2002
- Recorded: California
- Genre: Rock
- Length: 52:00
- Label: Muscletone (U.S); Fargo (Europe)
- Producer: Wayne Kramer

Mother Superior chronology
Mother Superior (2001)	Sin (2002)	13 Violets (2004)

Sin is the fifth studio recording from Mother Superior and the first of two to be produced by MC5 legend Wayne Kramer. It was released through Kramer's Muscletone.

== Track listing ==
No.	Title	Length
1.	"Strange Change"	4:26
2.	"Talk to the Future"	4:44
3.	"Pretty in the Morning"	3:16
4.	"Jaded Little Princess"	2:31
5.	"Spinnin'"	5:09
6.	"Rollin Boy Blues"	3:24
7.	"Aint Afraid of Dying"	3:46
8.	"Fool Around"	5:03
9.	"Downtown Toms Medicine #2"	3:40
10.	"Rocks"	3:18
11.	"Fade Out, Wounded Animal"	12:39
Total length:		51:56

== Personnel ==
- Jim Wilson – vocals, guitars
- Marcus Blake – bass
- Jason Mackenroth – drums
