= Tearing (song) =

Single by Rollins Band

from the album The End of Silence
- Released: August 1992
- Recorded: 1991
- Genre: Punk rock, alternative metal
- Length: 4:58
- Label: Imago
- Songwriters: Rollins Band (Henry Rollins, Chris Haskett, Andrew Weiss and Sim Cain)
- Producer: Andy Wallace

Rollins Band singles chronology
"Tearing" (1992)	"Low Self Opinion" (1992)

"Tearing" is a 1992 single by the American rock band Rollins Band, from the album The End of Silence.

== Legacy ==
In a 2015 Louder Sound article, guitarist Chris Haskett picked it as one of his ten favorite Rollins Band songs, and said that "the riff has a Van Halen shape to it." It was the only song from The End of Silence that made his list.

== Cover versions ==
The song was covered 28 times by Pearl Jam from 1992 to 1994.

== CD single track listing ==
1. "Tearing (Edit)" - 5:18
2. "Ghost Rider" - 10:15
3. "Earache My Eye" - 3:08
4. "(there'll be no) Next Time (live)" - 7:12

== Charts ==
Chart (1992)	Peak position
UK Singles (OCC)	54
