= The Heavy Soul Experience =

The Heavy Soul Experience of Mother Superior

Studio album by Mother Superior
- Released: 1996
- Recorded: California
- Genre: Rock
- Length: 48:20
- Label: Top Beat Records
- Producer: Mother Superior

Mother Superior chronology
| Right In A Row (1993) | The Heavy Soul Experience of Mother Superior (1996) | Kaleidoscope (1989) |

Professional ratings
Review scores
| Source | Rating |
|---|---|
| Allmusic | 4/5 stars |

The Heavy Soul Experience is the first full-length studio album from Mother Superior. It features the original Wilson-Blake-Mackenroth line-up.

== Track listing ==
1. "Can Ya Hear Me?" – 5:10
2. "Way Tin Onya" – 3:18
3. "Sneakin" – 3:26
4. "Guess I'm A Fool Again" – 4:58
5. "Valentine's Day" – 2:10
6. "The Wiggle" – 4:31
7. "Right On Time" – 5:28
8. "Part Time Loser" – 4:04
9. "You Don't Miss Your Water" – 3:44
10. "Fools Prayer" – 8:46
11. "An Extra Slice of Heavy Soul" – 2:47

== Personnel ==
- Jim Wilson – vocals, guitars
- Marcus Blake – bass
- Jason Mackenroth – drums
