= Rollins Band =

American rock band

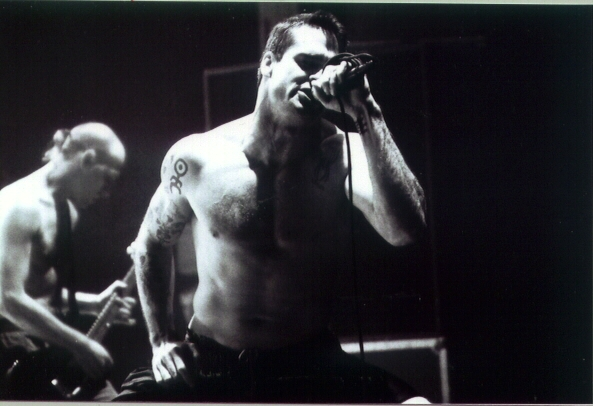
- Founder and frontman Henry Rollins with Chris Haskett (background)

Background information
- Also known as: The Rollins Band
- Origin: Los Angeles, California, U.S.
- Genres: Alternative metal; post-hardcore; hard rock; funk metal
- Years active: 1987–1997, 1999–2003, 2006
- Labels: 2.13.61; Sanctuary; Buddah; DreamWorks; Imago; Texas Hotel; Quarterstick
- Past members: Henry Rollins; Chris Haskett; Sim Cain; Andrew Weiss; Melvin Gibbs; Jim Wilson; Marcus Blake; Jason Mackenroth
- Website: www.twothirteensixtyone.com

Rollins Band was an American rock band formed in Los Angeles. The band was active from 1987 to 2006 and was led by former Black Flag vocalist Henry Rollins. They are best known for the songs "Low Self Opinion" and "Liar", both of which garnered heavy airplay on MTV in the early-mid 1990s.

Critic Steve Huey describes their music as "uncompromising, intense, cathartic fusions of funk, post-punk, noise, and jazz experimentalism, with Rollins shouting angry, biting self-examinations and accusations over the grind."

In 2000, Rollins Band was included on VH1's 100 Greatest Artists of Hard Rock, ranking at No. 47.

== History ==
=== Precursors (1980–1986) ===
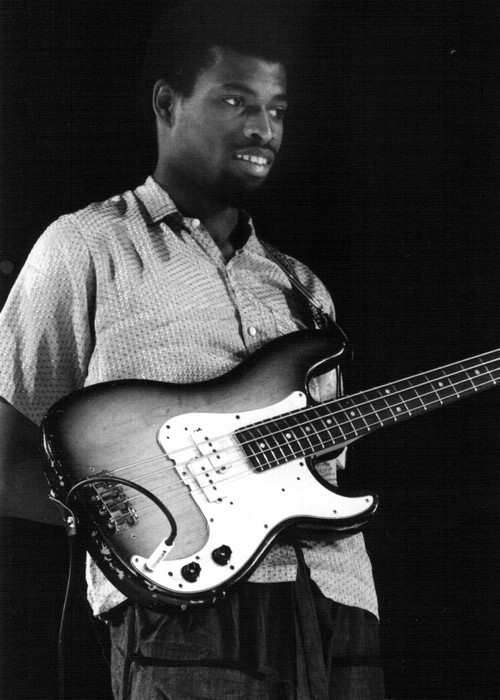
Gibbs in a July 1980 performance in Paris, France

Rollins was the singer for the Washington, D.C. punk rock band State of Alert from October 1980 to July 1981. Afterwards, he sang with California punk rock band Black Flag from August 1981 to August 1986. Black Flag earned little mainstream attention, but through a demanding touring schedule, came to be regarded as one of the most important punk rock bands of the 1980s.

Less than a year after Black Flag broke up, Rollins returned to music with guitarist Chris Haskett (a friend from Rollins' teen years in Washington D.C.), bass guitarist Bernie Wandel, and drummer Mick Green. They officially formed the band in Leeds, West Yorkshire, where Haskett was living, where they wrote and recorded their earliest material.

This lineup released two records: Hot Animal Machine (credited as a Rollins solo record and featuring cover art drawings by Devo leader Mark Mothersbaugh) and Drive by Shooting (credited to "Henrietta Collins and the Wifebeating Childhaters"). The music was similar to Black Flag's, though it flirted more with heavy metal and funk.

=== First edition (1987–1994) ===
Soon after, Rollins formed Rollins Band with Haskett, bassist Andrew Weiss, and drummer Sim Cain. Weiss and Cain had previously played with Gone, an instrumental rock group led by guitarist and Black Flag founder Greg Ginn). Live sound engineer Theo Van Eenbergen was also credited as a band member, under the name Theo Van Rock.

This lineup released three studio albums between 1988 and 1992. They scored two minor hits from the 1992 album The End of Silence: "Tearing" was successful in the UK, and "Low Self Opinion" appeared on the Billboard modern rock chart.

Critics Ira Robbins and Regina Joskow described this lineup as a "brilliant, strong ensemble ... the band doesn't play punk (more a jazzy, thrashy, swing take on the many moods of Jimi Hendrix), but what they do together has the strengths of both. The group's loud guitar rock with a strong, inventive rhythmic clock borrows only the better attributes of metal, ensuring that noise is never a substitute for purpose."

=== Second edition (1994–1997) ===
Rollins's tour diaries from this era details the personal and creative tensions that led to Weiss being fired following the End of Silence tour. These diaries were published by Rollins's 2.13.61 company as See A Grown Man Cry and Now Watch Him Die.

The band's new bassist was jazz and funk veteran Melvin Gibbs, who'd been highly recommended by Living Colour guitarist Vernon Reid, a friend of the Rollins Band since the first Lollapalooza tour. Cain and Gibbs had also both played in different versions of guitarist Marc Ribot's band. Gibbs performed on Ribot's album Rootless Cosmopolitans (1990) and Cain on Requiem for What's His Name (1992).

The first video from 1994's Weight, "Liar", was the band's highest-charting single. The music video depicted Rollins sporting numerous costumes (including a police officer and a nun), and was a major hit on MTV. The band appeared at Woodstock '94, and Rollins was a guest-host for several MTV programs, including 120 Minutes.

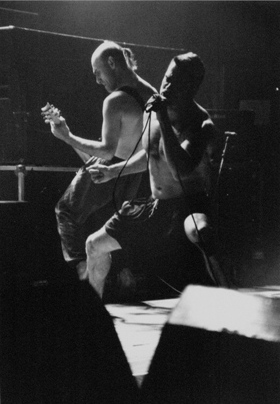
Rollins Band performing in 1994

This version of Rollins Band had the most overt jazz leanings of the band's history. Gibbs had begun his career with Reid in the 1980s jazz fusion group of drummer Ronald Shannon Jackson, and worked with guitarist Sonny Sharrock on aggressive jazz-rock albums like 1987's Seize the Rainbow. These influences, along with Rollins' obsession with the late '60s/early '70s electric/fusion era of iconic trumpeter Miles Davis, shaped this version of the band's music. During the sessions for Weight, Rollins Band recorded with free jazz saxophonist Charles Gayle, though these sessions remained unreleased for ten years at Gayle's request to avoid conflicts with his contractual obligations. The Gayle sessions were released in 2003 as Weighting.

In 1996, there was a legal battle with the band's former label, Imago Records. Rollins claimed "fraud, deceit, undue influence and economic coercion" on the label's part.

After the contractual dispute was resolved, Rollins Band signed with the then-new major label DreamWorks Records, who released 1997's Come In and Burn. The single "Starve" did not chart, but "The End of Something" was a minor UK hit. The band appeared on Saturday Night Live to promote the album (season 22, episode 18). However, Come In and Burn was not as commercially successful as Weight. After touring for Burn, Rollins dissolved the group, citing creative stagnation.

=== Third edition (1999–2003) ===
Rollins replaced the Haskett-Gibbs-Cain lineup with the Los Angeles rock band Mother Superior, retaining the name Rollins Band, and released Get Some Go Again (2000) and Nice (2001). They also released a two-disc live album, The Only Way to Know for Sure.

This lineup was a more straightforward hard rock group. Their first album featured "Are You Ready?" a cover of a Thin Lizzy song, featuring Lizzy guitarist Scott Gorham; Rollins has often expressed fondness for Thin Lizzy and its founder, Phil Lynott.

=== Fourth edition (2006) ===
In between other commitments (his radio show Harmony in My Head, his cable/satellite TV show The Henry Rollins Show, and his spoken word tours), Rollins also reunited the Haskett-Gibbs-Cain lineup. In a March 2006 blog entry on henryrollins.com, Rollins admitted, "Actually we have been practicing on and off for months now, slowly getting it together ... It's been really cool being back in the practice room with these guys after all these years."

Rollins told Alan Sculley of The Daily Herald that this reunion with Haskett, Gibbs and Cain would not become long-term unless the group decided to write new songs: "Let's put it this way. I don't want to go out and hit America again without a new record, or at least a new album's worth of material. Otherwise the thing will lack legitimacy ... Miles Davis would never do that. And I'm not into a greatest-hits thing. I think a band, if you're going to be around, you should be moving forward and putting in the time and working for it, getting after the art. Otherwise you're just playing retreads. ... Imagine a tree that grows canned peaches. It's nothing I want to do."

The band opened some concerts for X, and played on the first-season finale of The Henry Rollins Show on August 12, 2006.

=== Hiatus and retirement ===
In 2011, Rollins stated that he has retired from music, meaning that Rollins Band has come to an end.

Former member Jason Mackenroth died on January 3, 2016, in Nevada from prostate cancer.

== Musical style and influences ==
Rollins Band's sound has been described as alternative metal, post-hardcore, hard rock and funk metal genres. Chris Haskett has highlighted the impact of King Crimson on the original lineup's sound, stating:

"There were three records in particular, at the beginning of the 70s – Starless and Bible Black, Larks' Tongues in Aspic, and Red. And just the aesthetics of those records... they’re so heavy. And they have almost dark quality – they’re almost metal. (...) And those King Crimson records are very, very heavy and dark. They have an incredible musical tension. But they’re also very rich with a lot of depth. The tonalities within the intervals and the progressions – they use a lot of flatted fifths which creates a kind of dark tone. And also just a radical dynamics, if you’re listening to these records – they’re incredibly from powerful - from heavy rich chords to near silence. (...) And they also improvised a lot. A lot of King Crimson stuff is just jamming. It’s not noodling, they’re doing collective improvisation. It’s not all written out. And some of the most amazing parts of their music were just improvised. That was what we also brought into Rollins Band. There was a lot of space for improvisation. Not noodling, not a kind of wasting time. But actually making unwritten music happen. And it’s (sic) also came from Grateful Dead."

Mid-career albums such as Weight also had a pronounced jazz influence.

Rollins Band were a major fixture of the early 1990s Los Angeles alternative metal scene, alongside Tool, Jane's Addiction, Rage Against the Machine and Green Jellÿ. Rollins' shout-singing style proved influential to later alternative and nu metal artists, such as Coal Chamber, Korn, Chevelle, Godsmack and System of a Down. The Rollins Band songs "Tearing" and "Shine" have been covered by Pearl Jam.

== Awards and nominations ==
Award	Year	Nominee(s)	Category	Result	Ref.
MTV Video Music Awards	1994	"Liar"	Best Metal/Hard Rock Video	Nominated	

== Band members ==
=== Final lineup ===
- Henry Rollins – lead vocals (1987–1997, 1999–2003, 2006)
- Chris Haskett – guitars (1987–1997, 2006)
- Sim Cain – drums, percussion (1987–1997, 2006)
- Melvin Gibbs – bass (1993–1997, 2006)

=== Former members ===
- Andrew Weiss – bass (1987–1992)
- Jim Wilson – guitars, piano (1999–2003)
- Marcus Blake – bass (1999–2003)
- Jason Mackenroth – drums, percussion, saxophone (1999–2003; died 2016)

== Discography ==
=== Studio albums ===
Title	Details	Peak chart positions						Sales
Title	Details	US	AUS	GER	NLD	SWE	UK	Sales
Life Time	Released: 1988; Label: Texas Hotel; Format: CD, CS, LP	—	—	—	—	—	—	
Hard Volume	Released: 1989; Label: Texas Hotel; Format: CD, CS, LP	—	—	—	—	—	—	
The End of Silence	Released: February 25, 1992; Label: Imago; Format: CD, CS, 2xLP	160	68	—	—	—	—	US: 260,000
Weight	Released: April 12, 1994; Label: Imago; Format: CD, CS, LP	33	10	53	35	29	22	US: 423,000
Come In and Burn	Released: March 25, 1997; Label: DreamWorks; Format: CD, CS	89	38	71	76	52	76	US: 96,000
Get Some Go Again	Released: February 29, 2000; Label: DreamWorks; Format: CD, CS	180	40	60	—	—	112	US: 48,000
Nice	Released: August 21, 2001; Label: Sanctuary/SPV; Format: CD, CS, 2xLP	178	64	56	—	—	—	

=== Outtakes and demos collections ===
- A Nicer Shade of Red (2001)
- End of Silence Demos (2002)
- Yellow Blues (2003)
- Weighting (2004)
- Come In and Burn Sessions (2004)
- Get Some Go Again Sessions (2005)

=== Live albums ===
- Live Split Album with Dutch band Gore – recorded at El Mocambo, Toronto, Canada, May 17, 1987
- Do It – Studio Outtakes and Live (1988)
- Turned On (Quarterstick Records, 1990)
- Electro Convulsive Therapy (1993)
- Insert Band Here: Live in Australia, 1990 (1999)
- A Clockwork Orange Stage (2001)
- The Only Way to Know for Sure: Live in Chicago (2002)

=== EPs ===
- Live in Deventer, Holland, October 1987 (1988)
- I Know You b/w Earache My Eye (1990)
- Hammer of the Rök Gödz (1992)

=== Singles ===
List of singles, with selected chart positions
Title	Year	Peak chart positions					Album
Title	Year	US Main	US Mod	AUS	NLD	UK	Album
"Tearing"	1992	—	—	—	—	54	The End of Silence
"Low Self Opinion"	1992	—	25	—	—	—	The End of Silence
"Liar"	1994	40	26	65	28	27	Weight
"Disconnect"	1994	—	—	—	—	27	Weight
"The End of Something"	1997	—	—	—	—	77	Come In and Burn
"Starve"	1997	—	—	—	—	—	Come In and Burn
"Illumination"	2000	—	—	—	—	—	Get Some Go Again
"Get Some Go Again"	2000	—	—	—	—	—	Get Some Go Again
"—" denotes singles that were released but did not chart.

==== Promotional singles ====
- "You Didn't Need" (1992) – radio promo
- "Fool" (1994) – 2×12" promo
- "Your Number Is One" (2001) – radio promo

=== Miscellaneous ===
- Rise Above: 24 Black Flag Songs to Benefit the West Memphis Three (2002)

=== Other appearances ===
Year	Song	Album
1994	"Ghost Rider"	The Crow: Original Motion Picture Soundtrack
1995	"Four Sticks"	Encomium: A Tribute to Led Zeppelin
1995	"Fall Guy"	Demon Knight (soundtrack)
1995	"I See Through"	Johnny Mnemonic (soundtrack)
2001	"What's the Matter Man"	Tony Hawk's Pro Skater 3 (soundtrack)
