= 13 Violets =

Studio album by Mother Superior
- Released: 2004
- Recorded: California
- Genre: Rock
- Length: 42:12
- Labels: Top Beat (U.S); Fargo (Europe)
- Producer: Wayne Kramer

Mother Superior chronology
| Sin (2002) | 13 Violets (2004) | Moanin (2005) |

Professional ratings
Review scores
| Source | Rating |
|---|---|
| Allmusic | 4/5 stars |

13 Violets is the sixth Studio recording from Mother Superior and the second of two to be produced by MC5 legend Wayne Kramer. This is Mother Superior's last record featuring Jason Mackenroth on drums.

== Track listing (U.S version) ==
| No. | Title | Length |
|---|---|---|
| 1. | "Head Hanging Low" | 3:12 |
| 2. | "13 Violets" | 4:29 |
| 3. | "Five Stars" | 3:17 |
| 4. | "Queen of the Dead" | 2:18 |
| 5. | "Four Walls" | 4:01 |
| 6. | "Turbulence" | 3:28 |
| 7. | "Fuel The Fire" | 3:44 |
| 8. | "Did You See It" | 3:37 |
| 9. | "Everybody Wants" | 4:12 |
| 10. | "I Desire You" | 4:37 |
| 11. | "Everything is Alright" | 2:39 |
| 12. | "Kicked Around" | 2:01 |

== Euro Version (Fargo) ==
The European release differs from the U.S. version.

- Tracks appear in a different order.
- "Starlett" (3:15) and "What if" (2:51) replace "Everybody Wants" and "Everything is Alright".
- Also there is a bonus video of "Jaded Little Princess" on the compact disc version.

== Personnel ==
- Jim Wilson – vocals, guitars
- Marcus Blake – bass
- Jason Mackenroth – drums
