= Disconnect (Rollins Band song) =

Single by Rollins Band

from the album Weight
- B-side: "Miles Jam"
- Released: 1994
- Studio: American Recording / Rumbo Recorders / The Grey Room (Los Angeles)
- Genre: Alternative metal
- Length: 4:58
- Label: Imago
- Songwriter(s): Sim Cain; Melvin Gibbs; Chris Haskett; Henry Rollins
- Producer(s): Theo Van Rock

Rollins Band singles chronology
"Liar" (1994)	"Disconnect" (1994)	"The End of Something" (1997)

Alternative cover
- 1994 CD cover

"Disconnect" is a song by Rollins Band. It is the second single released in support of their fourth album Weight.

== Formats and track listing ==
All songs written by Sim Cain, Melvin Gibbs, Chris Haskett and Henry Rollins

US 7" single

1. "Disconnect" – 4:31
2. "Disconnect" (Edit) – 4:57

US CS single (72787-25084)

1. "Disconnect" (Edit) – 4:32
2. "Miles Jam" – 6:15

US CD single (72787-25078)

1. "Disconnect" (Edit) – 4:31
2. "Plague" – 4:29
3. "Miles Jam" – 6:15

Australian CD single (72787250892)

1. "Disconnect" – 4:32
2. "Right Here Too Much" – 4:41
3. "Night Sweat" – 5:15
4. "Night Sweat" – 4:29
5. "Plague" – 6:15

== Charts ==
Chart (1994)	Peak position
UK Singles (OCC)	27

== Release history ==
Region	Date	Label	Format	Catalog
Australia	1994	Imago	CD	72787 25089
Europe	1994	Imago	CD	72787 25078
Europe	1994	Imago	VHS	
United States	1994	Imago	CD	72787 25084
United States	1994	Imago	CD	DMD 1795
United States	1994	Imago	CS	72787-25084
United States	1994	Imago	7"	
