= The End of Silence =

Studio album by Rollins Band
- Released: February 25, 1992
- Recorded: October 1991
- Studio: Showplace Studios, Dover, New Jersey
- Genre: Alternative metal; post-hardcore
- Length: 72:30
- Label: Imago
- Producer: Andy Wallace

Rollins Band chronology
Turned On (1990)	The End of Silence (1992)	Weight (1994)

Singles from The End of Silence
- 1. "Low Self Opinion" Released: February 1992; 2. "Tearing" Released: August 1992

The End of Silence is the third studio album by the American rock band Rollins Band, led by singer Henry Rollins. The album was released in February 1992 by Imago Records and spawned two singles, including the MTV hit "Low Self Opinion". It was their first release to reach the US Billboard 200 chart, and is considered their mainstream breakthrough, with the band having previously released a string of underground albums.

== Background ==
The End of Silence was the band's first release for the independent label Imago Records. The label signed them to an eight album contract, on the back of their performance at the inaugural edition of Lollapalooza in 1991. At the time, the label had a distribution deal with BMG, which has led to some considering this as the major label debut of Rollins Band. It has been claimed that the album title was a reference to the broader exposure the band would get by being on a larger label. In 1992, Rollins commented, "it's weird doing the Imago thing. You walk in there and it's this major label. I've made I don't know how many records and I've been paid maybe three times in my life. [It's] weird to get a royalty check in the mail. 'What's this for?', and they say 'you make records, that's what you get paid for'."

It was recorded over six weeks during October 1991, at Showplace Studios in Dover, New Jersey. Many of the songs on The End of Silence had already been written before the band recorded their previous studio album, 1989's Hard Volume. "Another Life" has been described as being about drug addiction, while "Just Like You" revolves around Rollins' abusive father. Regarding the lyrical content, Rollins said in 1992 "I wrote lyrics that really challenged me. I finally had the courage to write about my father on the song 'Just Like You'. I really had problems dealing with it in the past".

The cover features a stylized drawing of the sun identical to the one tattooed on Rollins' back. The album's liner notes credit the artwork to California tattoo artist Rick Spellman.

== Musical style ==
In their 1999 book VH1 Rock Stars Encyclopedia, authors Dafydd Rees and Luke Crampton described it as "mixing elements of blues and jazz into an otherwise uncompromisingly intense punk-metal set." In 2022, Guitar World labelled it as being the heaviest album the band had released up until that point, while Metal Hammer in 2021 considered it to have the sound the band would later become synonymous with, saying that "blues rock, jazz, swing and prog all propped up a rock hard alt-metal sound." Regarding the mixture of styles on The End of Silence, guitarist Chris Haskett said in 2020, "there was never a strategy or plan for writing the music so it wouldn’t be right to say we intended to combine anything in particular." It has been noted for having less of a punk-focused sound than their prior works. Haskett said, "Hard Volume is when the hard rock edge (especially Van Halen) starts creeping in and colors how we write together. End of Silence is when we really fully took on our own ensemble voice. The music on it is more collective and, I think, organic than on the earlier two albums."

== Reception ==
Professional ratings
Review scores
Source	Rating
AllMusic	4/5 stars
Christgau's Consumer Guide	(dud)
Collector's Guide to Heavy Metal	8/10
Los Angeles Times	3.5/4 stars
MusicHound Rock	3.5/5 stars
Rolling Stone	2.5/5 stars
Select	4/5 stars
Spin Alternative Record Guide	6/10
Vox	9/10

The End of Silence has received positive reviews from critics, and as of 1996 had sold 260,000 copies, making it their most commercially successful release prior to 1994's Weight. Stephen Thomas Erlewine of AllMusic observed that the singles received substantial airplay on MTV's Headbangers Ball program, writing that the album "further cemented Rollins' profile with yet another audience: metalheads." Erlewine further wrote, "Rollins released other solid records, but The End of Silence remains his best." Hard Report's February 1992 review states that, "[Rollins'] influence bleeds through the alternative and metal ranks, in a variety of forms", adding that the album is "a hard blast of Rollins at his best, in a form that should enjoy a very warm reception from metal radio (perhaps more so than alternative)". In February 1992, Billboard gave it a positive review, writing that, "Henry Rollins makes the leap to the majors without compromising [their] ear-bending sound, which creamed unsuspecting audiences at the Lollapalooza tour last year." Jon Dominguez of Californian paper the Palo Verde Valley Times wrote in October 1992 that "The End of Silence is very intense and it sounds and feels so real", adding that "some of the tracks are over ten and eleven minutes long, but I never lose interest."

Steve Hochman of the Los Angeles Times gave it a three and a half rating out of four in March 1992, and labelled it as the "crowning achievement" of Rollins' career. In December 1992, music writer Chris Morris named it as one of his ten best records of 1992, praising the band for "pushing outside of the hard rock envelope." A more negative review at the time came from the Pittsburgh Post-Gazette's Tony Norman, who in March 1992 called it a "step backwards in rock's self indulgent past". He further said, "since a lot of hipsters don't seem to care that former Black Flag singer Henry Rollins traded in the punk aesthetic for jams that extend six minutes beyond their logical conclusion, I'll state what should be obvious to anyone who wades through all 72 minutes of The End of Silence — it's boring man."

=== Legacy ===
Tool bassist Justin Chancellor has mentioned that he was a fan of The End of Silence when it was first released. In a 2006 retrospective on the making of the album, Albert Mudrian of Decibel magazine wrote, "while Kurt Cobain was altering the course of popular music’s history, underground icon Henry Rollins and his band were busy eating cheese sandwiches, avoiding the temptations of nearby stripper joints, and putting a masterpiece of dark, angular grooves and introspective firestorms to tape." In the 2009 book Spray Paint the Walls: The Story of Black Flag, author Stevie Chick considered the album's lyrical themes to be similar to that of Rollins' last few albums with Black Flag, but noted that it had "a more muscular and, ultimately, audience-pleasing [sound]". In 2022, Louder Sound ranked it as the second best Rollins Band album, behind only Weight. That same year, Spin included it on a list titled "30 Overlooked 1992 Albums Turning 30". Metal Hammer included it on a 2021 list of the 20 best metal albums of 1992, and also listed it as being one of the 100 best metal albums released in the 1990s.

=== Accolades ===
Year	Publication	Country	Accolade	Rank
1992	Rock de Lux	Spain	"Albums of the Year"	23
1992	Sounds	Germany	"Albums of the Year"	24
1992	Select	United Kingdom	"Albums of the Year"	40
1996	Visions	Germany	"The Eternal Readers Charts"	63
1996	Visions	Germany	"The Best Albums 1991–96"	*
1999	Visions	Germany	"The Most Important Albums of the Nineties"	15
2000	Terrorizer	United Kingdom	"100 Most Important Albums of the Nineties"	*
2004	Decibel	United States	"Hall of Fame"	19
2005	Rock Hard	Germany	"The 500 Greatest Rock & Metal Albums of All Time"	426
2022	Metal Hammer	United Kingdom	"Top 20 Best Metal Albums of 1992"	*
"*" denotes an unordered list.

== Track listing ==
All songs written by Henry Rollins, Chris Haskett, Andrew Weiss and Sim Cain.

1. "Low Self Opinion" – 5:18
2. "Grip" – 4:50
3. "Tearing" – 4:58
4. "You Didn't Need" – 5:30
5. "Almost Real" – 8:03
6. "Obscene" – 8:50
7. "What Do You Do" – 7:22
8. "Blues Jam" – 11:46
9. "Another Life" – 4:39
10. "Just Like You" – 10:57

== Personnel ==
=== Rollins Band ===
- Henry Rollins – vocals
- Chris Haskett – guitar
- Andrew Weiss – bass
- Sim Cain – drums

=== Production ===
- Theo Van Rock – engineering
- Andy Wallace – production, engineering, mixing
- Howie Weinberg – mastering

== Charts ==
Album

Chart (1992)	Peak position
Australian Albums (ARIA)	68
US Billboard 200	160
US Top Heatseekers	7

Singles

Year	Title	Peak chart positions	
Year	Title	US Mod	UK
1992	"Low Self Opinion"	25	—
1992	"Tearing"	—	54
"—" denotes singles that were released but did not chart.
