= Low Self Opinion =

Single by Rollins Band

from the album The End of Silence
- Released: February 1992
- Recorded: 1991
- Genre: Alternative metal
- Length: 5:18
- Label: Imago
- Songwriters: Rollins Band (Henry Rollins, Chris Haskett, Andrew Weiss and Sim Cain)
- Producer: Andy Wallace

Rollins Band singles chronology
"Tearing" (1992)	"Low Self Opinion" (1992)	"Liar" (1994)

"Low Self Opinion" is a 1992 single by American rock band Rollins Band from the album The End of Silence. "Lie, Lie, Lie" is exclusive to this release and wasn't on the album.

== Track listing ==
1. "Low Self Opinion" – 5:18
2. "Lie, Lie, Lie" – 7:18

== Accolades ==
Year	Publication	Country	Accolade	Rank
2004	Kerrang!	United Kingdom	"666 Songs You Must Own (Alternative Rock)"	14
"*" denotes an unordered list.

== Charts ==
Chart (1992)	Peak position
US Alternative Airplay (Billboard)	25
