= Liar (Rollins Band song) =

Single by Rollins Band

from the album Weight
- Released: 1994
- Recorded: 1993–1994
- Genre: Alternative metal; jazz metal
- Length: 6:34 (album); 4:19 (radio); 4:49 (video)
- Label: Imago
- Songwriter: Rollins Band
- Producer: Theo Van Rock

Rollins Band singles chronology
"Low Self Opinion" (1992)	"Liar" (1994)	"Disconnect" (1994)

"Liar" is a song by Rollins Band and the lead single from their fourth album, Weight, released in 1994. It was the album's only charting single and is one of the group's best known songs.

== Background ==
In 2011, Rollins reported that "Liar" began during one of the first practice jam sessions with bassist Melvin Gibbs, who joined in 1993, replacing Andrew Weiss. "Liar" was a loose, humorous improvisation performed at live concerts until executives at Imago Records suggested the song had the potential to be a hit single. Rollins thought the song was a b-side that would not even be featured on Weight. However, when the record label heard it, they immediately proposed it be the lead single. The lyrics are narrated from the perspective of a manipulative liar who repeatedly takes pleasure from deceiving others after luring them closer with false sympathy and friendship: "And all the time that you're needing me / Is just the time that I'm bleeding you".

Both a short edit (4:19) and a longer "video edit" (4:49) were distributed as CD singles in various territories, often with one or more unreleased tracks from the Weight sessions added; these and other outtakes were included in the 2004 release Weighting.

The video edit of "Liar" was featured in the song's music video and features a different vocal track and slightly different lyrics in the opening section. Directed by Anton Corbijn, the video itself features alternating depictions of vocalist Henry Rollins. During the song's verses, he wears glasses and a plain black T-shirt and speaks in a calm, soothing tone about trust and friendship; from one verse to the next, his arms and face become increasingly stained with black paint. For the chorus segments, he is shirtless and painted red, wildly jumping and flailing about as he screams derisively at his audience for believing his lies. He is also seen dressed in a Superman parody costume, a police officer uniform, and a nun's habit.

== Meaning and musical style ==
The song's lyrics are from the perspective of a serial liar who alternates between declarations of sympathy and friendship on the one hand, then repeatedly gloating celebrations of their deceptions. Shortly after the release of Weight, Rollins said that "Liar" was not specifically written from the perspective of an abusive male character, but rather from a more general perspective.

In 2005, music critic and author Essi Berelian described the song's style as "jazz metal". Bass guitarist Melvin Gibbs worked extensively in jazz before joining Rollins Band, and Rollins himself is a jazz enthusiast. In his 1998 book Turned On: A Biography of Henry Rollins, author James Parker wrote that, "'Liar' is a classic Rollins Band arrangement, following the contours of what is basically a hard-edged, stand-up routine: first the easy listening hull of the verse, in which Rollins, his musicians hitting a bullshit cocktail hour groove behind him, seduces his lover with the promise of an end to loneliness — and then the explosive heavy metal punchline of the chorus in which he reveals himself as a parasite, destroyer, liar, a Iago like instrument of evil."

== Reception and legacy ==
It was nominated for the Grammy Award for Best Metal Performance in 1995, with Rollins Band performing the song at the ceremony. Upon release, the "Liar" video gained heavy airplay on MTV. This led to it appearing as part of the Beavis and Butt-head episode "Liar! Liar!", which aired on July 15, 1994. In the episode, Beavis becomes excited about the chorus, repeating the word "Liar!" in the same way he typically says "Fire! Fire! Fire!". Butt-head comes to the conclusion that "lying rules."

"Liar" was named the 64th best hard rock song of all time by VH1. It was included in the 1997 book The 7500 Most Important Songs for the Rock and Roll Era, which called it a "bravura piece of heavy metal as performance art." In 2019, former Headbangers Ball host Riki Rachtman ranked it fifth on his list of the "10 Best Metal Videos Of The '90s."

== Accolades ==
Year	Publication	Country	Accolade	Rank
1994	Studio Brussels	Belgium	"Best Songs of the Year (1994)"	21
2004	Kerrang!	United Kingdom	"666 Songs You Must Own (Alternative Rock)"	*
"*" denotes an unordered list.

== Charts ==
Chart performance for "Liar"
Chart (1994)	Peak position
Australia (ARIA)	65
Netherlands (Single Top 100)	28
UK Singles (Official Charts)	27
US Bubbling Under Hot 100 (Billboard)	9
US Alternative Airplay (Billboard)	26
US Mainstream Rock (Billboard)	40
