= Bernie Wandel =

American musician

Bernie Wandel is an American musician best known as the bass guitarist for two Henry Rollins albums, Hot Animal Machine and Drive By Shooting.

In addition to the Rollins Band, he has performed in The Nuclear Crayons, Special K, Guilt Combo, 9353, Raincrow and Elegy Circa 1923. He was also a member of the Chris Haskett Trio.

In the 1990s he managed the Black Cat night club in Washington, D.C., and, calling himself a "bass historian", he organized and hosted events such as Getting to First Bass, a series of solo bass performances.

His work with Henry Rollins and other punk bands is cited in Dance of Days: Two Decades of Punk in the Nation's Capital, by Mark Andersen and Mark Jenkins.

== Yoga Work ==
Bernie is an E-RYT 500 certified yoga teacher. His primary instructors were John Schumacher, founder of the Unity Woods Yoga Center, and Judith Hanson Lasater. For many years he assisted Judith Lasater in the instruction of anatomy, therapeutic asana and restorative yoga.
