= A Nicer Shade of Red =

Compilation album by Rollins Band
- Released: 2001
- Recorded: 2000–2001
- Genre: Punk rock, alternative metal
- Length: 62:32
- Label: 2.13.61
- Producer: Henry Rollins

Rollins Band chronology
Nice (2001)	A Nicer Shade of Red (2001)	Rise Above (2002)

A Nicer Shade of Red is a compilation album by the Rollins Band. It was recorded at the same sessions that produced Nice, making it a companion piece to that album, and was released directly by Rollins' 2.13.61 label.

== Background ==
In addition to previously unreleased material, the album also features four songs that only appeared on vinyl or foreign CD releases of Nice as well as an extended mix of "Your Number Is One" and a cover of The Dead Boys' "Ain't It Fun". In the liner notes for the album, Henry Rollins said, "there's some strange and cool stuff here, and perhaps some over the top and indulgent material as well."

One dollar from each CD sold in the United States went to the Southern Poverty Law Center. It was their third release to generate money for the organization.

== Track listing ==
1. "Too Much Rock and Roll" (3:50)
2. "Marcus Has The Evil in Him" (4:01)
3. "Nowhere To Go But Inside" (3:04)
4. "10X" (3:04)
5. "Always the Same" (2:57)
6. "Soul Implant" (1:56)
7. "Raped" (4:57)
8. "Ain't It Fun" (Peter Laughner, Cheetah Chrome) (3:43)
9. "You Lost Me" (5:47)
10. "Stone Washed Clean" (4:18)
11. "A Life Denied" (3:25)
12. "Your Number Is One" (long version) (4:37)
13. "Such a Drag" (12:55)

All songs written and composed by Henry Rollins, Jim Wilson, Marcus Blake and Jason Mackenroth and published by Be Drinkable Music (BMI)/MS Catalog (ASCAP) except where noted.

== Personnel ==
Rollins Band

- Henry Rollins – vocals (credited as "throat")
- Jim Wilson – guitar, piano
- Marcus Blake – bass
- Jason Mackenroth – drums

with:

- Mike Curtis – road manager (also credited with "knower of many things and whatnot")
- Darrell Bussino – FOH sound (also credited with "The Way. Justice.")
- Kerim Imes – percussion on "Your Number Is One (long version)"

== Production Personnel ==
- Henry Rollins – producer
- Clif Norrell – recording and mixing engineer
- Mike Curtis – "great guitar sounds" (i.e. helping produce and record the guitar tracks)
- Stephen Marcussen – mastering
- Sander De Jong – assistant recording engineer
- Chris Reynolds – assistant mixing engineer (Sunset Sound Recorders)
- Paul Smith – assistant mixing engineer (Skip Saylor Recording)

== Studios ==
- Cherokee Studios – tracking
- Sunset Sound Recorders – mixing
- Skip Saylor Recording – mixing
