= Gore (band) =

Dutch rock band

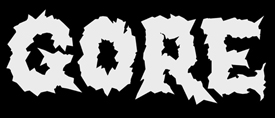

Background information
- Origin: Venlo, Netherlands
- Genres: Hardcore punk, heavy metal, noise rock
- Years active: 1985–1997, since 2019
- Labels: Eksakt, Megadisc, Messback, Southern Lord
- Members: Marij Hel (Rob Frey); Johan van Reede; Bardo Maria (Bardo Koolen)
- Past members: Pieter de Sury (Pieter de Swart); Danny Arnold Lommen; Martin van Kleef; Frankie Stroo (Frank Stroobants); Joes Bentley (Yussef Benli)
- Website: www.gore-revanche.com

Gore was a Dutch rock band formed in 1985. They released five studio albums, one live album, one EP, two compilation albums with live material, demo recordings and remixes and had two compilation appearances between 1986 and 1997. They split up in 1997.

Gore played their avant-garde hardcore solely instrumental. Their music was influenced by Metal and Industrial music and combined the darkest and heaviest moments of Black Sabbath, Black Flag and Big Black. They obtained an excellent live reputation in the hardcore scene of the late 80s and received predominantly positive reviews. Nevertheless, they remained unknown to the general public and never gained commercial success.

Today GORE are considered seminal and highly influential. Their early works were groundbreaking for several subgenres, such as sludge metal, stoner rock and drone metal. The later Gore are considered predecessors of Math rock.

== History ==
=== Gore I: Frey/Lommen/de Swart 1985–1988 ===
==== 1985 ====
After Pieter de Swart (guitar) and Martin van Kleef (bass) left their band Disgust, they started a new outfit with Danny Arnold Lommen (drums) who previously had played with Pandemonium. Very soon van Kleef left the band and was replaced by Rob Frey (bass) who works under the pen name Marij Hel. While playing in Gore Pieter de Swart used the pseudonym Pieter de Sury and Danny Arnold Lommen used several variations of his name, such as Danny A. Lome and Danny Arnold.

Frey joining the band might be considered the actual starting point of Gore, and Frey is the only band member of the early days staying in the band until their final breakup in 1997. Although particularly de Swart wrote a lot of the early Gore songs, Frey is considered the creative mastermind behind the band. Especially after the bands regrouping in 1991 this position of Frey was undisputed.

==== 1986 ====
Gore played their first show on February 26 at the "Effenaar Club" in Eindhoven opening up for the Swans.

In March the band's first album Hart Gore was recorded at Tango Studios in Eindhoven. The record was published by the Dutch label Eksakt Records.

Hart Gore was recorded live in the studio, no overdubs or additional recordings were added. Producer Theo van Eenbergen excellently captured the band's sound that shows a flagrant disregard for any kind of sonic restrained. Hart Gore was the first collaboration of Gore and van Eenbergen who produced several albums of the band in the following years.

The cover of the album shows a photograph of a raw pig's heart pierced by a samurai sword. The picture is a work of Dutch photographer Egon Notermans.

Hart Gore consists of 10 extremely reduced, repetitive, rhythmical and riff-dominated songs. The tracks lack almost all melody but are interspersed by tempo and rhythm changes. Feedback and distortions replace harmonies and volume is an essential element of the music. Gore on their debut are violent, loud and dirty. They break metal down to its essence, its pulsating, vibrant heart that then lies before us naked, just like the pig's heart on the cover of the record.

Although Hart Gore is an instrumental record, lyrics to songs are included. With the exception of their last studio album Mest 694‘3 and the compilation album Slow Death, this will be the case with all Gore albums.

The controversial lyrics are no less radical and raw as the music of Gore. The vulgar outbreaks of violent images and obscenities give insight into the negative, pessimist world view of the band. The lyrics are signed with „Val Hard“ which is yet another pseudonym of Frey.

==== 1987 ====
Mean Man's Dream, the follow-up album, was recorded in Tango Studios in January 1987. Again the album recorded live in studio, produced by van Eenbergen and released on Eksakt Records.

Mean Man's Dream is even more monotone, minimal, metric and metallic than Hart Gore was. There are no adornments on Mean Man's Dream, there are no charismatic reference points such as vocals or solos. There is only the naked, screaming riff and the mercilessly pounding rhythm in manic intensity.

The iconic cover shows a crude butcher's knife on a scratched metal surface. The stark, direct photo, again taken by Notermans, visualizes perfectly the hard and cold aggression that fuels the music on the record.

The album received predominantly positive reviews internationally, sold fairly well and is seen by many fans as the essential Gore record.

In the summer Gore tours Europe with Henry Rollins who just had left Black Flag. Recordings made on this tour later appear on a Gore / Henry Rollins split LP.

The Gore / Henry Rollins split LP is released in autumn 1987. It contains four live songs by Gore, which were recorded at a show at „De Bakkerij“ in Eindhoven. Three of the four songs are taken from the first two albums, but the song Arena is exclusively released this record. Gore / Henry Rollins Live is the last Gore record released by Eksakt Records.

On October 27 GORE record the first of three Peel Sessions for British DJ legend John Peel. The session is aired by the BBC on November 4.

The recordings for the first Peel Session are the last recordings made in the original line up of Frey / Lommen / de Swart. Pieter de Swart leaves the band shortly after.

=== Gore II: Frey/Lommen/Stroobants/Benli 1988–1989 ===
==== 1988 ====
After de Swart had left the band, two new guitar players, Frank Stroobants (using the pseudonym Frankie Stroo) and Yussef Benli (using the pseudonym Joes Bentley), joined in.

Gore was invited to play at the New Music Seminar in New York and so they did. It was there that they signed a contract with the bigger label Megadisc Records to release the next album.

Wrede (The Cruel Peace) was recorded in August 1988 in at „As The Grass Is Two Asses High“ studios in Weesp, NL. It was produced by van Eenbergen and Steve Albini and released as a double album by Megadisc. Wrede was the last collaboration of Gore and Theo van Eenbergen, who would work closely with Henry Rollins in the following years. Under the pseudonym Theo van Rock he went on to produce all records of the Rollins Band until their disbandment in 2001.

There are only 4 tracks on Wrede, one on each side of the double album. The epic compositions, running between 15 and 25 minutes, are more mellow, mature, melodic and differentiated than those of the earlier albums. The crystalline, sharp aggression gave way to a doomy atmosphere. Van Eenbergen and Albini provided the album with a sound, that almost seems orchestral. Wrede is a heavy, deep behemoth of an album and Gore reach their stylistic climax with it.

Considered by many fans and critics to be Gore's opus magnum and the most influential album of the band, the monolithic, idiosyncratic album failed in achieving wider recognition, and the responses in listeners and critics fell short of expectations.

During the summer, Gore toured Europe with Negazione from Italy.

A second Peel Session was recorded on November 29, 1988. It contained two tracks from Wrede and was aired December 6.

Gore officially disbanded in early 1989.

Drummer Danny Arnold Lommen joined Caspar Brötzmann Massaker and stayed with them until they broke up in 1995. Lommen went on to work with Dee Dee Ramone in later years. Guitarist Frank Stroobants played in several bands after GORE and releases solo projects up until today.

=== Gore III: Frey/Koolen/van Reede 1991–1997 ===
==== 1991 ====
After a hiatus of two years, Frey brought Gore back to life with a new line up. With Johan van Reede (guitar) and Bardo Koolen (using the pen name Bardo Maria, drums) he re-established the band.

The first recordings of that outfit were done on July 9. For the third Peel Session GORE recorded five songs from their next album. The session was broadcast in Peel's show on September 21, 1991.

==== 1992 ====
Lifelong Deadline, Gore's fourth studio album is recorded August / September 1992 and released by Armageddon Records that winter as a two-CD set. In contrast to previous albums all material was written between 1989 and 1992 by Rob Frey alone, and he also produced the album himself. The songs on Lifelong Deadline are more complex, composed and controlled than those on the earlier releases. The sound is clearer and cleaner. The new Gore are more technical and less noisy. With its atypical, complex rhythmic structures and odd time signatures Lifelong Deadline is just as much a predecessor of Math Rock as the earlier recordings had been precursors of Stoner Rock and Sludge Metal.

The Album also is distinctly more experimental, and the first Gore album that is not entirely instrumental. There is still no singing but the songs are riddled with numerous samples of absurd spoken scenes in several languages and sounds of nature. The spoken scenes were recorded with a twenty-person ensemble called "The United Voices From The House Of Suspicion". For the first time there is a guest musician, piano player Bart Spaan plays the song Waiting Time.

The French label Permis De Construire released the compilation Mortar in 1992. It contained two songs and the artist name was given as Gore/Hoer. These are actually no Gore recordings but a side project of Frey. The choreographer Xander Verwoort had asked Frey to write music for his performances. Frey produced scores for two of Verwoort's shows that consist of experimental sound collages. Both scores were released as albums. The first one, Stereo, under the band name "Rob Frey's Hoer" by Megadisc Records in 1991, and the second one, Truth & Trust, in 1992 by Barooni Records under the name "Hore".

The German band Bohren & der Club of Gore name their band after Gore.

==== 1993–1995 ====
In June 1993 Gore again play at the New Music Seminar in New York. The show is recorded and partially released on Slow Death in 1997.

In 1994 Frey established his own record label, Messback Music. Messback solely released albums by Gore and Frey's side projects. Messback's first releases were re-issues of Hart Gore and Mean Man's Dream on CD and a compilation cassette titled In The Name Of Rotten, Evil & Gore. The tape consisted of live and demo recordings taken in the years 1985–1987. Most of the material was re-released on Southern Lord Records' re-issues of Hart Gore and Mean Man's Dream in 2008, but the song Cracking Walls was exclusively released on In The Name Of Rotten, Evil & Gore. Gore toured Europe to promote the releases.

In 1995 Messback issues an album by CET, another of Frey's side projects. The album is titled This Is No House / This Is A Tree.

==== 1996 ====
The next Gore release is considered to be the most peculiar Gore record by many. It is the only Gore production with actual singing. With Dutch pop singer Henk Westbroek four songs for an EP were recorded in June and December 1995. Westbroek had several mainstream hits with his band Het Goede Doel in the 80s and was regarded as one of the Netherlands' most successful musicians.

The EP was recorded at NOB Audio Studios. Messback releases the CD as Gore & Henk: Voor Nu De Eeuwigheid in early 1996. Gore drummer Bardo Maria only performs one of the songs, the others were recorded with drummer Johnbert Dijker.

To the Fans of Westbroek as well as to the fans of Gore the collaboration might have seemed odd and disconcerting. The most interesting song for Gore fans is probably the instrumental Door Schaduw en Stilte. The obscure EP completely fell through with the critics and the fans alike.

==== 1997 ====
In February Messback Records release a new Gore album. Mest 694’3 – The 10 Ultimate Hart Gore Rhythm Tracks contains Material that Frey had written already in 1994. Gore recorded the material in the Frey / van Reede / Bardo Maria line up in January and December 1995 at Total Recall Studios in Venlo. Additional material was recorded December 1996 at Trauma III Studios in Het Brook. The recordings were produced by Frey and producer Remko Schouten.

The Cover was yet another photograph by Egon Notermans. It shows a red-hot screw. There is also a warning printed on the CD cover: "Warning! This CD is not suitable for Radio Air Play! It is mastered at 10 dB overhead! If radio broadcasted: dear DJ—take all Limiters off!"

Just as on Lifelong Deadline, the songs on Mest 694’3 are interspersed with samples and absurd voice recordings. The Song In The Name Of Evil, Rotten & Gore was accompanied by guest musicians R. Yen (keyboards) and Gino Taihuttu (mouth harp).

Gore released their last album Slow Death in May 1997. In a limited edition of 6000, the CD came with issue #27 of Gonzo Circus Magazine.

There is only one new song on the CD. Beyond The Black Hole PT. III, a sound collage of electronic noises. Slow Death also contains three songs from Mest 694’3 remixed by Frey (“Deranged Slow-Death Remix”), and live versions of four songs from Lifelong Deadline. The live songs were recorded June 27, 1993 at Knitting Factory, New York, when Gore performed there for the New Music Seminar.

Furthermore, there is a Version of In The Name OF Evil, Rotten & Gore performed by the renowned Metropole Orkest, that was recorded live in February 1997. The last Track on Slow Death consists of an 11-second spoken intro followed by 10 minutes of silence.

After the release of Slow Death GORE disbanded.

=== After the split ===
Rob Frey joins Dutch folk rock band De Nieuwe Blijdschap in which he plays guitar.

Guitarist Johan van Reede and Dutch singer Annemiek van Gründling formed the band Super Spade and play classic rock cover versions.

In 2008 the American label Southern Lord re-issues Hart Gore and Mean Man's Dream. Each record contains the ten songs from the original LP and each song in a live or demo version recorded 1986 & 1987. The re-issue of Hart Gore contains three additional songs. A studio left over of The Hunt that was not used for the original release of Hart Gore; a quite interesting very early version of Death Has Come, recorded live with Pieter de Swart on guitar; and a practice room recording of Gore destroying David Bowie's Station to Station. Each album was issued as a double vinyl LP including a booklet with lyrics, rare pictures and detailed liner notes by Rob Frey. A two CDs set with both albums and a 32 pages booklet was also released.

In 2014 a Gore page was created by German publisher Violess War. In The Name Of Rotten, Evil & Gore contains an extensive Gore history and the whole discography of the band by permission of Rob Frey / Messback Music and Southern Lord Records.

=== Reunion 2019 ===
In April 2018 Gore announced a reunion in the lineup Rob Frey, Johan van Reede and Bardo Koolen. In March 2019 they released the album Revanche on the German label Exile On Mainstream. That album contains ten songs from the 1992 double CD Lifelong Deadline, the production of which the band considered a failure. The tracks were partly re-recorded and remixed by Gore and Terry Date. The band played a series of shows in Germany, Belgium and the Netherlands in March and April 2019 and announced additional shows later that year.

== Discography ==
=== Studio albums ===
- Hart Gore (1986) Eksakt
- Mean Man's Dream (1987) Eksakt
- Wrede/The Cruel Peace (double) (1988) Megadisc
- Lifelong Deadline (1992) Armageddon
- Mest/694'3 (1996) Messback
- Revanche (2019) Exile on Mainstream

=== Live albums ===
- Live (1987) Eksakt (with Henry Rollins)

=== EPs ===
- Gore & Henk: Voor Nu De Eeuwigheid (1996) Messback (with Henk Westbroek)

=== Compilations ===
- Out of Nowhere CD (1990) Out of Nowhere
- Mortar CD (1992) Permis de Construiere Deutschland
- In the Name of Rotten, Evil & Gore Cassette (1994) Messback
- Slow Death (1997) (6,000 copies issued free with Gonzo Circus magazine)
- Hart Gore & Mean Mans Dream CD (2008) Southern Lord
