= Life Time (Rollins Band album) =

Studio album by Rollins Band
- Released: 1988
- Recorded: Off Beat Studios, Leeds, UK; Kortrijk, Belgium
- Genre: Post-hardcore
- Length: 40:10
- Label: Texas Hotel
- Producer: Ian MacKaye

Rollins Band chronology
Drive by Shooting (1987)	Life Time (1988)	Do It (1987)

Life Time is the debut studio album by the American rock band Rollins Band, fronted by ex-Black Flag singer, Henry Rollins. The album was produced by Ian MacKaye. It was reissued in 1999, 2007, 2014 and 2021.

== Production ==
The album was recorded in November 1987 at Off Beat Studios in Leeds, England and mastered in December 1987 at K Disc Studios, Los Angeles, California. It was produced by Ian MacKaye who was active in the hardcore punk scene; as a musician and co-owner of Dischord Records. Rollins was a childhood friend of MacKaye and had worked as a roadie for MacKaye's band, the Teen Idles.

== Musical style ==
The album has a more punk-influenced sound when compared to the band's better-known work from the 1990s. Guitarist Chris Haskett later said that, "Lifetime is our first album playing together and there are a bunch of different styles from the individual players but they haven’t combined yet."

== Release ==
Life Time was originally released in 1987 on Texas Hotel Records and included four live tracks recorded in Kortrijk, Belgium in October 1987 on the CD edition.

The album was subsequently re-mastered and re-released in 1999 by 2.13.61 and Buddha without the live tracks but with the addition of three tracks from the Do It album; "Do It", "Move Right In," and "Next Time".

In 2014, it was reissued on 2.13.61/Dischord, including the original live tracks but not the 1999 bonus tracks.

In 2021, the album had a digital and limited vinyl release.

== Reception ==
Professional ratings
Review scores
Source	Rating
Allmusic	3/5 stars
Alternative Press	4/5 stars
Spin Alternative Record Guide	5/10

In an AllMusic review, Chris True says "When Henry Rollins emerged from the breakup of Black Flag, many thought he couldn't be successful without guitarist Greg Ginn. If nothing else, Life Time proves the detractors wrong. With Ian MacKaye of Fugazi in the production chair, Rollins Band was able to distance themselves from Black Flag with a tight, visceral, and sometimes bluesy album. While more abrasive than later Rollins Band releases, this is worth picking up to better understand the progression of Rollins Band's unique style of emotional funk metal.

== Track listing ==
=== 1988 LP, 2014 reissue ===
Side one
No.	Title	Length
1.	"Burned Beyond Recognition"	2:56
2.	"What Am I Doing Here?"	3:21
3.	"1,000 Times Blind"	2:57
4.	"Lonely"	4:16
5.	"Wreck-Age"	5:33

Side two
No.	Title	Length
6.	"Gun in Mouth Blues"	8:57
7.	"You Look at You"	3:31
8.	"If You're Alive"	2:42
9.	"Turned Out"	5:57
Total length:		40:10

=== 1988 CD ===
Recorded live in Kortrijk, Belgium October 16, 1987

No.	Title	Length
10.	"What Am I Doing Here?"	3:20
11.	Untitled	1:19
12.	"Burned Beyond Recognition"	2:51
13.	"Move Right In"	8:34
14.	"Hot Animal Machine II"	8:36
Total length:		64:50

=== 1999 CD reissue ===
No.	Title	Length
10.	"Do It"	2:43
11.	"Move Right In"	7:27
12.	"Next Time"	3:20
Total length:		53:40

== Personnel ==
Rollins Band

- Henry Rollins – vocals
- Chris Haskett – guitar
- Andrew Weiss – bass
- Sim Cain – drums
