= Mother Superior (band) =

American rock band

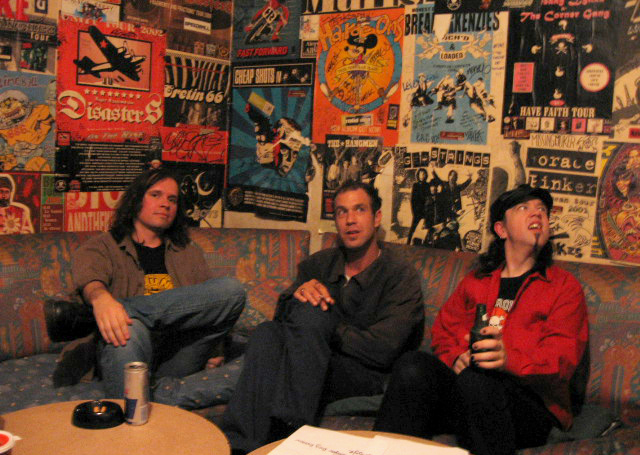
- From left: Marcus Blake, Matt Tecu, Jim Wilson

Background information
- Origin: United States
- Genres: Blues rock, hard rock, experimental
- Years active: 1993–2011
- Label: Various
- Past members: Jim Wilson; Marcus Blake; Matt Tecu; Jason Mackenroth
- Website: mother-superior.com

Mother Superior was an American hard rock band based in Los Angeles and active from 1993 to 2011. A power trio, they originally consisted of guitarist/vocalist Jim Wilson, bassist Marcus Blake and drummer Jason Mackenroth. Mother Superior released eight studio albums.

== History ==
Wilson, Blake and Mackenroth backed vocalist Henry Rollins for three studio albums as the final lineup of Rollins Band from 1997 to 2003. In 2005, Mackenroth quit and was replaced by Matt Tecu. Mackenroth died on January 3, 2016, in Nevada from prostate cancer complications.

In addition to playing live with the Rollins Band and U2 producer Daniel Lanois, Mother Superior (as a group or its members individually) have done session work with Daniel Lanois, Tony Visconti, Alice Cooper, Meat Loaf, Emmylou Harris, Sparks, Anthrax, Wayne Kramer, Lemmy, George Clinton, Iggy Pop, Mike Patton, Dig, and Queens of the Stone Age.

== Motor Sister ==
A few years after Mother Superior disbanded, vocalist Pearl Aday reached out to Wilson as a gift for her husband, guitarist Scott Ian of Anthrax. A longtime Mother Superior fan, Ian wanted to play some of his favorite Mother Superior songs with Wilson.

Aday, Ian and Wilson were joined by bassist Joey Vera (Fates Warning, Armored Saint) and drummer John Tempesta (The Cult, Exodus, Testament, and White Zombie). This led to the group re-recording twelve of the songs and releasing them in 2015 under the name Motor Sister.

Their first album was titled "Ride" and in 2022, their second album "Get Off" was released

== Discography ==
Studio albums

Year	Title	Label	Notes
1993	Right in a Row	Self Produced	An eight-song recording/demo
1996	The Heavy Soul Experience	Top Beat Records	Self-released
1997	Kaleidescope	Top Beat Records	Self-released
1998	Deep	Top Beat Records	Japanese version 1999 - Crown Records
2001	Mother Superior	Triple X Records	
2002	Sin	Muscletone Records	European version 2003 - Fargo Records
2004	13 Violets	Top Beat Records	European version 2004 - Fargo Records
2005	Moanin'	Bad Reputation	(Matt Tecu joins on drums) Release in Europe
2007	Three Headed Dog	Rosa Records	Release in Europe
2008	Grande	Kickin' Records	Release in Europe

Live albums

- Live at The Whisky (1998 - Top Beat Records)
