= Chris Haskett =

American guitarist

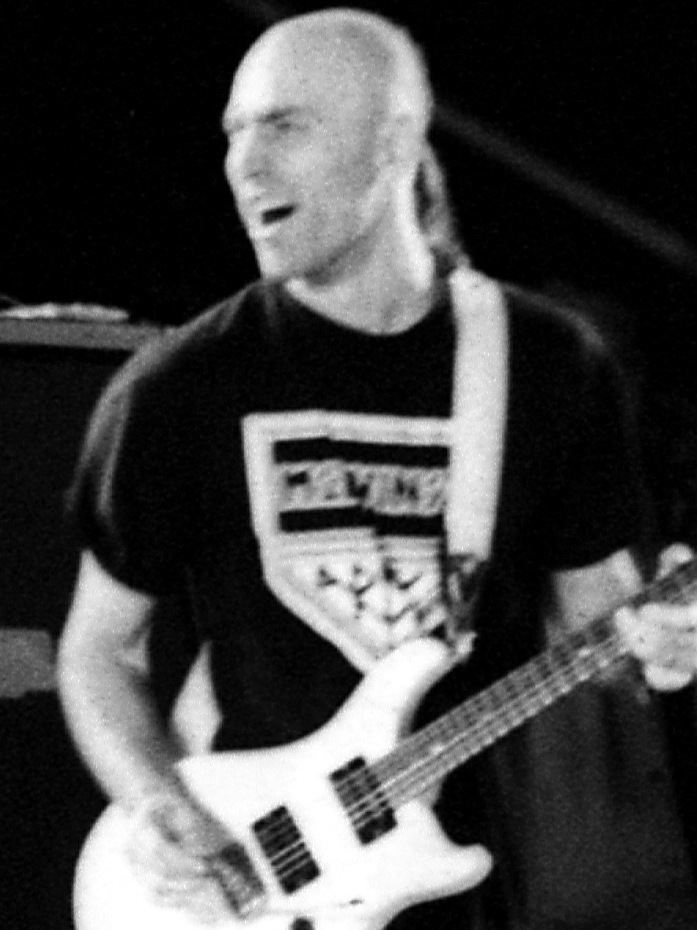
- Haskett performing with the Rollins Band in 1993

Background information
- Born: 1962 (age 63–64); Washington, D.C., U.S.
- Occupation: Guitarist
- Formerly of: Rollins Band
- Website: chrishaskett.com

Chris Haskett (born 1962) is an American guitarist. He was a member of the rock band Rollins Band from 1986 to 1997 and again for the band's reunion in 2006. He has also recorded or performed with David Bowie, Foetus, Pigface, The Cassandra Complex, Tool, The Joy Thieves, and others.

== Biography ==
Haskett was born in Washington, D.C. He spent 1976–1977 in the UK where he was greatly inspired by the birth of the UK punk scene. Soon after his return to the US he was recruited into seminal D.C. band The Enzymes. Heavily inspired by such diverse influences as Sun Ra, The Art Ensemble of Chicago, The Damned and Captain Beefheart, the band existed at the fringes of what would eventually turn into Washington, D.C. hardcore. After the appearance of the Bad Brains on the scene, the band became moved to a more conventionally punk and reggae repertoire. The Enzymes recorded a number of sessions but never released any.

In 1982 he moved to Leeds to finish an undergraduate degree in Philosophy. While there he joined Dave Coleman a.k.a. Surfin Dave's surf/trash band. Originally called the Beany T's, the band was rechristened the Absent Legends. The band played a good deal in the UK and released one LP. In Search of a Decent Haircut on Crammed Discs in 1985. The Absent Legends disbanded the following year.

During a return visit to Washington, D.C. in the Summer of 1986, Haskett encountered longtime friend Henry Rollins. The two had been in regular contact since 1984 and often discussed musical collaboration. The serendipitous meeting turned into an improvised plan. Washington, D.C. bassist Bernie Wandel and Absent Legends drummer Mick Green were brought in as rhythm section and the result was the album Hot Animal Machine.

From 1987 to 1997, Haskett was the guitarist in the Rollins Band. The band racked up close to a thousand performances across the globe and were known for a high-intensity blend of raw energy and profound musicianship. In 1994 they were nominated for a Grammy and performed live at the ceremony. This incarnation broke up in 1998 after finishing their tour on the Come In and Burn album. Rollins kept the Rollins Band name with a new lineup of the band. The Rollins/Haskett/Cain/Gibbs lineup reformed briefly for the "As the World Burns" tour with Los Angeles rockers X.

Post-Rollins Band, Haskett has done multiple, mostly low-profile, projects. Throughout the 1990s he played his own instrumental compositions live with various bands. Inspired by both Sonny Sharrock and the Grateful Dead, the instrumentation was usually guitar, bass, and two drummers. 1995 saw his first solo release Language , a mixture of angular, dense, difficult acoustic guitar (some in duet with ex-Birthday Party guitarist Rowland S. Howard) and tape loops inspired by musique concrète . In 1997 he released the CD "Nonfiction" in collaboration with drummer Brandon Finley (of Dog Eat Dog). The CD was a fusion of electric jazz and the go-go music that had been the soundtrack to his Washington, D.C. teen years. 2002 saw the release of "" which showcased a more conventional approach to the electric guitar and allowed his debt to his heroes such as Zappa and Beck to show through. He reunited with Brandon Finley for 2011's Maybe Definitely " (a play on Jeff Beck's title "Definitely Maybe") and another foray into the jazz/go-go territory the two explored on "Nonfiction". In 2014, he released The Courage Born of Conflicting Terrors " in collaboration with Nick Enfield and Mirna Sodre.

Other past projects included collaborations with Reeves Gabrels at the end of the 1990s, the Preaching to the Perverted Tour with Pigface, The Cassandra Complex, Foetus ("Blow tour 2001"). He is also heard on the song "If I'm Dreaming My Life" on the David Bowie album 'hours...'.

Now resident in Australia, Haskett continues to record and tour.

== Equipment ==
Haskett was one of the first "indie" guitarists to put Paul Reed Smith guitars in front of large audiences notably on the Rollins Band's 1991 tour on the first Lollapalooza. His customized PRS CE24's, later combined with the original appearance of the Mesa Boogie Dual Rectifier series became a staple of modern rock. More recently, his association with Paul Reed Smith resulted in a unique 9-string custom which has the lower E-A-D strings coursed for a 12-string sound but leaves the high G-B-E strings single to allow easier bends and solos.
